= Perverted by Language =

Studio album by The Fall
- Released: 12 December 1983
- Recorded: Pluto Studio, Manchester, England
- Genre: Post-punk
- Length: 47:04
- Label: Rough Trade
- Producer: Steve Parker

The Fall chronology
| Fall in a Hole (1983) | Perverted by Language (1983) | The Wonderful and Frightening World Of... (1984) |

Perverted by Language is the sixth studio album by the English post-punk group the Fall, released in December 1983 on Rough Trade Records.

The record gave the band their first number one album on the UK Independent Chart since Grotesque (After the Gramme) in 1980, and spent fourteen weeks on the chart.

== Background ==
Perverted by Language is the first Fall album to feature Brix Smith, then-wife of Mark E. Smith. However, the majority of the album was recorded before she had joined the band.

It was released in 1983 by Rough Trade in the UK and New Zealand (the latter being a cassette only version), Virgin Records in France, Megadisc in the Netherlands, Line Records in Germany, and Base Record in Italy. The album was the only full-length product of the band's renewed relationship with Rough Trade, whom they had previously left in 1981.

The band fell out with Rough Trade over Rough Trade turning all its resources to the Smiths, and also the full-length video the band wished to make for the album. The video Perverted by Language Bis went ahead funded by the group themselves and producers Ikon (Factory Records), with videos directed by Claude Bessy. The video was released on VHS in 1984 (a DVD edition was released by Cherry Red in 2003). By the time of the album and later the video's release, the group had signed to Beggars Banquet.

== Content ==
The album opens with "Eat Y'self Fitter", described by a music critic as "an endlessly cycling rockabilly chug with extra keyboard oddities and sudden music-less exchanges for the chorus". John Peel picked the song as one of his Desert Island Discs. Peel stated when he first heard the track – in a session the band recorded in March 1983 – he had fainted and that his producer, John Walters, had to resuscitate him. "Neighbourhood of Infinity" was seen by AllMusic's Ned Raggett as "a sequel of sorts to 'The Man Whose Head Expanded'". "Garden" features what Q magazine's Simon McEwen considered Mark E. Smith's "most oblique lyrics yet". Brix Smith, who was not yet a full-time group member, co-wrote and performs lead vocals on "Hotel Blöedel" (originally "One More Time for the Record", a song written for her band Banda Dratsing); the title was inspired by a night's stay in a Nuremberg hotel next door to an abattoir. It was the first Fall track to feature anyone other than Mark E. Smith on lead vocals.

Side two opens with "Smile", which according to Raggett "shows the band's abilities at tense audio drama excellently", with "a relentless, steady build, winding up to a total explosion that never comes". "I Feel Voxish" has been described as Mark E. Smith's "sound experiment", "where he gets playful with meter and alliteration". "Tempo House" was taken from a video recording of the band's performance at The Haçienda in July 1983 as, according to Paul Hanley, the studio bass sound was disappointing. The album closes with "Hexen Definitive/Strife Knot", described as "almost a country (and western) stroll" and "one song that encapsulated The Fall's spirit".

== Critical reception ==
Professional ratings
Review scores
| Source | Rating |
|---|---|
| AllMusic | 4/5 stars |
| Christgau's Record Guide | B− |
| Classic Rock | 7/10 |
| Mojo | 4/5 stars |
| Record Mirror | 3/5 stars |
| The Rolling Stone Album Guide | 4/5 stars |
| Smash Hits | 8/10 |
| Sounds | 2.5/5 stars |
| Spin Alternative Record Guide | 9/10 |
| Uncut | 4/5 stars |

Reviewing Perverted by Language, Robert Christgau commented on "side-openers that go on so long you don't really notice your attention flagging as their momentum gives way to, well, poetry readings – roughly accompanied, as usual". The NME's Jim Shelley saw it as the Fall "plodding on, going nowhere, making do", although he described "Smile" as "one of the great Fall moments... where the notorious Fall-as-an-idea is driven into reality". David McCullough, writing in Sounds, panned the album as "overall laborious and very dull indeed". Andy Strike of Record Mirror deemed it "as uncompromising as ever", but also lacking in material that matches "the heights of Slates or the more inspired moments on Room to Live". A favourable review came from Smash Hits, whose critic Claire Sheaff described Perverted by Language as "the record for all times and places".

Brian Edge, in his book Paintwork: A Portrait of The Fall, considered that the album demonstrated Mark E. Smith's "ability to use words as blunt instruments, as opposed to painterly devices or catchphrases". AllMusic reviewer Ned Raggett called it "another fine album". Trouser Press saw it as a preparation for the albums that followed, stating that "they chug away with more conviction than ever". Classic Rock's Emma Johnston stated that it "finds them in a playful mood as guitarist Brix Smith makes her debut. As they dip their toes into krautrock and even wonky psychedelia, it marks another new chapter in their evolution." In his book The Secret History of Rock, Roni Sarig viewed the album as the band taking "a distinct turn toward a more accessible, pop-oriented sound". Mike Rubin, writing in the Spin Alternative Record Guide, praised it as an "excellent" album that "helped shift the Fall from droning, atonal minimalism to droning, atonal melodicism". Robert Ham of Stereogum saw it as a return to form after Room to Live, calling it "another near-masterpiece", and commenting on how Steve Hanley's bass lines drive the album. Marc Savlov, reviewing the reissued album in 2002 for The Austin Chronicle, was less receptive, saying that while it "feels like an honest-to-goodness Fall album", "when you're dealing with one of the UK's greatest musical eccentrics, finding any early material that doesn't immediately make your ears take cover behind the davenport really ought to be noted in the 'plus' column".

In 2002, Pitchfork listed Perverted by Language as the 82nd best album of the 1980s. In Billboard's 2018 list "The 10 Best Albums by The Fall: Critic's Picks", Perverted by Language was included at number seven.

== Track listing ==
*Note: writing credits as per original vinyl editions.

Side A
| No. | Title | Writer(s) | Length |
|---|---|---|---|
| 1. | "Eat Y'self Fitter" | Mark E. Smith (Note: Alternatively credited on all the CD editions to: M. Smith, S. Hanley) | 6:38 |
| 2. | "Neighbourhood of Infinity" | M. Smith, Karl Burns, Steve Hanley, Paul Hanley, Craig Scanlon | 2:41 |
| 3. | "Garden" | M. Smith, Scanlon (Note: Alternatively credited on all the CD editions to: M. Smith, Burns, Scanlon, P. Hanley, S. Hanley) | 8:42 |
| 4. | "Hotel Blöedel" | M. Smith, S. Hanley, Brix Smith (Note: Alternatively credited on all the CD editions to: M. Smith, S. Hanley) | 3:47 |

Side B
| No. | Title | Writer(s) | Length |
|---|---|---|---|
| 5. | "Smile" | M. Smith, Scanlon (Note: Alternatively credited on all the CD editions to: M. Smith, Scanlon, Burns, S. Hanley, P. Hanley) | 5:06 |
| 6. | "I Feel Voxish" | M. Smith, Marc Riley, S. Hanley | 4:19 |
| 7. | "Tempo House" (recorded live at The Haçienda, Manchester in July 1983) | M. Smith, S. Hanley | 8:51 |
| 8. | "Hexen Definitive/Strife Knot" | M. Smith, Burns, Adrian Niman, Scanlon (Note: Alternatively credited on all the CD editions to: M. Smith, Scanlon, Burns) | 6:57 |
| Total length: | | | 47:04 |

1998 & 2005 Castle CD bonus tracks
| No. | Title | Writer(s) | Length |
|---|---|---|---|
| 9. | "The Man Whose Head Expanded" (single A-side, 1983) | M. Smith, Scanlon, S. Hanley (Note: Alternatively credited on original single release to: M. Smith, Scanlon, S. Hanley, Sol Seaburg) | 4:19 |
| 10. | "Ludd Gang" (single B-side) | M. Smith, Scanlon, S. Hanley, P. Hanley, Burns | 2:31 |
| 11. | "Kicker Conspiracy" (single A-side, 1983) | M. Smith | 4:18 |
| 12. | "Wings" (single B-side) | M. Smith, S. Hanley, P. Hanley | 4:25 |
| 13. | "Pilsner Trail" (studio outtake) | M. Smith, Scanlon, Burns (Note: Alternatively credited on the 1998 CD edition to: The Fall, and on the Levitate bonus disc to: M. Smith, S. Hanley) | 4:49 |
| Total length: | | | 67:44 |

- On the 1998 reissue, bonus tracks 9–12 were placed prior to the album tracks, as they were released before the album. Track 13, a studio outtake from the album sessions, was placed after the album tracks. The 1998 edition has been remixed and a vocal part has been removed from "Garden".

2005 Castle bonus disc
| No. | Title | Writer(s) | Length |
|---|---|---|---|
| 1. | "Smile" (Peel Session, March 1983) | M. Smith, Burns, Scanlon, P. Hanley, S. Hanley | 5:11 |
| 2. | "Garden" (Peel Session, March 1983) | M. Smith, Burns, Scanlon, P. Hanley, S. Hanley | 10:00 |
| 3. | "Hexen Definitive / Strife Knot" (Peel Session, March 1983) | M. Smith, Scanlon, Burns | 9:07 |
| 4. | "Eat Y'Self Fitter" (Peel Session, March 1983) | M. Smith, S. Hanley | 7:01 |
| 5. | "Garden" (1998 remix) | M. Smith, Burns, Scanlon, P. Hanley, S. Hanley | 8:42 |
| 6. | "Neighbourhood of Infinity" (live at Alabama-Halle, Munich, 4 April 1984) | M. Smith, Burns, S. Hanley, P. Hanley, Scanlon | 3:07 |
| 7. | "Smile" (live at White Columns, New York 4 May 1983) | M. Smith, Burns, S. Hanley, P. Hanley, Scanlon | 5:39 |
| 8. | "Tempo House" (live at White Columns, New York 4 May 1983) | M. Smith, S. Hanley | 7:17 |
| 9. | "Perverted by Language" (live at the Electric Ballroom, London 8 December 1983) | M. Smith | 1:34 |
| 10. | "Wings" (live at the Hammersmith Palais, London 25 March 1982) | M. Smith, S. Hanley, P. Hanley | 3:35 |
| 11. | "Backdrop" (live at the Concorde, Brighton 27 October 1983) | The Fall | 11:11 |
| Total length: | | | 72:55 |

- "Neighbourhood of Infinity" was previously released on the 1987 Palace of Swords Reversed compilation, and "Smile" and "Tempo House" were previously released on the 1989 Speed Trials various artists compilation.

== Personnel ==
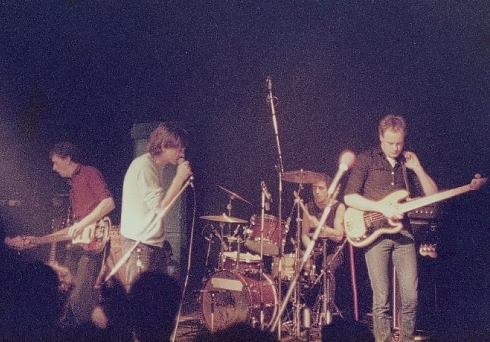
Perverted by Language tour, Hamburg, April 1984

The Fall

- Mark E. Smith – vocals, electric piano, violin on "Hotel Blöedel", keyboards on "Tempo House," guitar
- Steve Hanley – bass guitar, backing vocals on "Eat Y'Self Fitter"
- Paul Hanley – drums, keyboards, backing vocals on "Eat Y'Self Fitter"
- Craig Scanlon – guitar, backing vocals on "Eat Y'Self Fitter" and "Tempo House"
- Karl Burns – drums, percussion, bass guitar, backing vocals on "Eat Y'Self Fitter"
- Brix Smith – guitar and lead vocals on "Hotel Blöedel", backing vocals on "Eat Y'Self Fitter", guitar on "Neighbourhood of Infinity" (live)

Additional personnel

- Marc Riley – guitar on "Wings" (live)

Technical

- Steve Parker – production
- Heather Hanley – recording of "Tempo House"
- Oz McCormick – recording of "Tempo House"
- Claus Castenskiold – cover artwork
- Mark E. Smith – co-production on "The Man Whose Head Expanded", "Ludd Gang", "Kicker Conspiracy" and "Wings"
- John Porter – production on Peel Sessions
- Dave Dade – engineering on Peel Sessions
