= The Marshall Suite =

Studio album by the Fall
- Released: 19 April 1999
- Recorded: Late 1998-early 1999
- Studios: Battery Studios, London
- Genre: Alternative rock
- Length: 39:27
- Label: Artful Records
- Producers: Mark E Smith; Steve Hitchcock

The Fall chronology
Levitate (1997)	The Marshall Suite (1999)	Live 1977 (2000)

Singles from The Marshall Suite
- 1. "Touch Sensitive" Released: 22 March 1999; 2. "F-'Oldin' Money" Released: 16 August 1999

Professional ratings
Review scores
Source	Rating
AllMusic	4/5 stars
The Guardian	favourable

The Marshall Suite is a 1999 album by the Fall, their 20th. The album builds on the techno-influenced beats of its predecessor Levitate (1997), while also returning to a more rockabilly-influenced sound reminiscent of earlier Fall lineups with songs such as the catchy "Touch Sensitive" and the strange, complex, thumping jungle beats of "The Crying Marshal". The album was long out of print, but a new three-disc edition was released in the summer of 2011.

== Background ==
The Marshall Suite was made immediately after an American tour during which Mark E. Smith had an onstage fight with members of the band and was arrested following ongoing altercations at the hotel at which the group were staying. While the remaining band members quit and returned to England, leaving Smith in a cell in Manhattan, Julia Nagle chose to stay in the band, helping to assemble the group's new lineup. During the recording of the album, this new lineup was still taking shape; the group shed a drummer before recording could even begin, and the album features two different bassists. For these reasons, it is something of a patchwork: of 13 tracks, "On My Own" is a reworking of the previous album's "Everybody But Myself", three tracks are covers, two are sound collages, and "The Crying Marshal" is a remix by producer Steven Hitchcock of a Smith collaboration with the Filthy Three ("Real Life of the Crying Marshal"). Two songs use some of the same lyrics (a 14th track, "Tom Raggazzi", a reggae-tinged reprise of "Anecdotes...", was included on the vinyl version). Nevertheless, the album was well-received.

Around the time of the album's release, rumours circulated that The Marshall Suite was a concept album about the "Crying Marshal" character. Smith stopped short of denying this, telling The Wire that "I thought it would be good to do it as the story of his life, a themed LP, with a thread running through it. It's such an unhip thing to do." An unpublished section of the interview, later placed on the magazine's website, suggested that Smith was not yet finished with his creation: "I do want to continue the Marshall theme, develop it. Maybe a five-sided thing next, the return of the Marshall". However, he does not appear to have returned to the theme on any subsequent Fall album.

The first of the album's three covers, "F-'Oldin' Money", which Smith described as "half a cover ... based on a piece of rockabilly," is a 1959 track by American rockabilly singer Tommy Blake. "Bound" is originally a 1974 soul instrumental by The Audio Arts Strings titled "Love Bound", to which Smith added lyrics. The third cover, "This Perfect Day", was first released by Australian punk band the Saints in 1977.

An edit of the album's opening track "Touch Sensitive" was used in the UK as a soundtrack to an advert for the Vauxhall Corsa.

== Track listing ==
=== CD version ===
No.	Title	Writer(s)	Length
1.	"Touch Sensitive"	Mark E. Smith, Julia Nagle (Note: Credited on the original 1999 edition to Mark E. Smith, Julia Nagle, Steve Hitchcock.)	3:16
2.	"F-'Oldin' Money"	Tommy Blake, W. S. Stephenson, Carl Belew (Note: Credited on the original 1999 edition to Tommy Blake.)	2:45
3.	"Shake-Off"	Smith, Nagle, Tom Head, Karen Leatham, Steve Hitchcock, Neville Wilding (Note: Credited on the original 1999 edition to Mark E. Smith, Steve Hitchcock, Karen Leatham, Tom Head.)	3:03
4.	"Bound"	Smith, Frank Wilson, Henry Wilson, Vance Wilson, David Lee Cason (Note: Credited on the original 1999 edition to Mark E. Smith, Wilson Bros.)	3:19
5.	"This Perfect Day"	Chris Bailey, Ed Kuepper	2:10
6.	"(Jung Nev's) Antidotes"	Smith, Neville Wilding, Hitchcock	3:27
7.	"Inevitable"	Smith, Nagle, Head, Leatham	3:51
8.	"Anecdotes+Antidotes in B#"	Smith, Nagle, Head, Leatham (Note: Credited on the original 1999 edition to Mark E. Smith, Julia Nagle.)	2:59
9.	"Early Life of Crying Marshal"	Smith, Jason Barron, Hitchcock (Note: Credited on the original 1999 edition to Steve Hitchcock.)	0:50
10.	"The Crying Marshal"	Smith, Barron, Martin Neary, Hitchcock (Note: Credited on the original 1999 edition to Mark E. Smith, Steve Hitchcock.)	4:39
11.	"Birthday Song"	Smith, Nagle	3:38
12.	"Mad. Men-Eng. Dog"	Smith, Nagle, Spencer Marsden	2:18
13.	"On My Own"	Smith, Nagle, Simon Wolstencroft	3:12

=== Vinyl version ===
*Note: writing credits as per original vinyl edition.

Side A
No.	Title	Writer(s)	Length
1.	"Touch Sensitive"	Smith, Nagle, Hitchcock	3:16
2.	"F-'Oldin' Money"	Blake	2:45
3.	"Shake-Off"	Smith, Hitchcock, Leatham, Head	3:03
4.	"Bound"	Smith, Wilson Bros.	3:19
5.	"This Perfect Day"	Bailey, Kuepper	2:10

Side B
No.	Title	Writer(s)	Length
1.	"(Jung Nev's) Antidotes"	Smith, Wilding, Hitchcock	3:27
2.	"Inevitable"	Smith, Nagle, Head, Leatham	3:51
3.	"Anecdotes+Antidotes in B#"	Smith, Nagle	2:59
4.	"Finale: Tom Raggazzi"	Smith, Nagle, Head	2:21

Side C
No.	Title	Writer(s)	Length
1.	"Early Life of Crying Marshal"	Hitchcock	0:50
2.	"The Crying Marshal"	Smith, Hitchcock	4:39
3.	"Birthday Song"	Smith, Nagle	3:38
4.	"Mad. Men-Eng. Dog"	Smith, Nagle, Marsden	2:18
5.	"On My Own"	Smith, Nagle, Wolstencroft	3:12

=== 2011 reissue ===
Disc 1
1-13: as per original CD

No.	Title	Writer(s)	Length
14.	"Tom Raggazzi (Finale)"	Smith, Nagle, Head	2:21
Total length:			41:57

Disc 2

No.	Title	Writer(s)	Length
1.	"Touch Sensitive" (dance mix) ("Touch Sensitive" single B-side)	Smith, Nagle	7:13
2.	"Antidote" ("Touch Sensitive" single B-side)	Smith, Nagle, Head, Leatham	3:04
3.	"This Perfect Day" (new version) ("F-'Oldin' Money" single B-side)	Bailey, Kuepper	2:21
4.	"Birthday Song" (new mix) ("F-'Oldin' Money" single B-side)	Smith, Nagle	3:39
5.	"The REAL Life of the Crying Marshall" (new version) ("F-'Oldin' Money" single B-side)	Smith, Baron, Neary, Hitchcock	4:05
6.	"Tom Raggazzi" (new mix) ("F-'Oldin' Money" single B-side)	Smith, Nagle, Head	4:05
7.	"Touch Sensitive" (Peel Session #21; recorded 3 February 1998)	Smith, Nagle	3:39
8.	"Bound Soul One" (Peel Session #22; recorded 18 October 1998)	Smith, Wilson, Wilson, Wilson, Cason	3:53
9.	"Antidotes" (Peel Session #22; recorded 18 October 1998)	Smith, Nagle, Head, Leatham	5:00
10.	"Shake-Off" (Peel Session #22; recorded 18 October 1998)	Smith, Nagle, Head, Leatham, Hitchcock, Wilding	1:46
11.	"This Perfect Day" (Peel Session #22; recorded 18 October 1998)	Bailey, Kuepper	4:18
Total length:			41:05

Note

- "Antidote" is the same track as "(Jung Nev's) Antidotes" on The Marshall Suite album.

Disc 3 (Live show for XFM Radio, 14 April 1999)

No.	Title	Writer(s)	Length
1.	"Shake-Off" (live)	Smith, Nagle, Head, Leatham, Hitchcock, Wilding	3:55
2.	"F-'Oldin' Money" (live)	Blake, Stephenson, Belew	2:41
3.	"Jet Boy" (live)	David Johansen, Johnny Thunders	1:56
4.	"Touch Sensitive" (live)	Smith, Nagle	3:21
5.	"Antidotes" (live)	Smith, Nagle, Head, Leatham	2:46
6.	"10 Houses of Eve" (live)	Smith, Nagle	3:43
7.	"Inevitable" (live)	Smith, Nagle, Head, Leatham	2:43
8.	"This Perfect Day" (live)	Bailey, Kuepper	2:30
Total length:			23:38

== Personnel ==
The Fall

- Mark E. Smith – vocals, keyboards, guitar, bass guitar on "Tom Raggazzi (Finale)"
- Julia Nagle – keyboards, guitar, programming
- Neville Wilding – guitar, vocals
- Adam Helal – bass guitar
- Karen Leatham – bass guitar
- Tom Head – drums

Additional personnel

- Steve Hitchcock – string arrangements
- Steve Hanley – bass on Peel session #21
- Karl Burns – drums on Peel session #21
- John Rolleson – backing vocals on Peel session #21
- Speth Hughes – special effects on Peel session #22

Technical

- Mark E. Smith – production
- Steve Hitchcock – production
- Elspeth Hughes – engineering
- Jim Brumby – engineering
- Richard Flack – engineering
- Pascal Le Gras – photography
- Warne/Trustam – design
- Mike Robinson – production on Peel session #21
- Nick Scripps – engineering on Peel session #21
- Mike Engles – production on Peel session #¤22
- Kevin Rumble – engineering on Peel session #22
- Andy Pierce – remastering (2011 reissue)
