= Cerebral Caustic =

Studio album by The Fall
- Released: 27 February 1995
- Recorded: 1994 in London
- Genre: Post-punk
- Length: 42:15
- Label: Permanent Records
- Producers: Mike Bennett; Mark E. Smith

The Fall chronology
Middle Class Revolt (1994)	Cerebral Caustic (1995)	The Twenty-Seven Points (1995)

Cerebral Caustic is the seventeenth full-length studio album by English post-punk group the Fall, released in 1995 on Permanent Records. It spent one week on the UK Albums Chart at number 67, 19 places lower than its predecessor Middle Class Revolt, marking the end of one of the group's relatively more successful periods.

== Background and recording ==
Guitarist and former Fall member Brix Smith returned to the lineup, having rejoined the group for live shows in 1994 after quitting in 1989. She and ex-husband Mark E. Smith had come to an agreement that she would stay in Los Angeles and fly to the UK whenever needed for live performances and recording. Her impact was immediate, and she co-wrote five of this album's 12 tracks. Other tracks included a Frank Zappa cover ("I'm Not Satisfied") and a re-recording of a 1990 B-side, "Life Just Bounces". Nevertheless, sales were lower than with other recent albums, and the group, always a busy touring act, performed just 16 times during the year. Cerebral Caustic turned out to be the beginning of a period of considerable turbulence for the group; having not dismissed anyone since 1990, Smith sacked keyboardist Dave Bush by letter shortly after the album's completion. Guitarist Craig Scanlon, who had been with the band for 16 years and co-authored over 120 songs, would be sacked during the sessions for the epic single "The Chiselers" at the end of the year. Smith later admitted to MOJO magazine that he had developed a drink problem during this period and he accepted that this had impacted upon the group. Scanlon's dismissal is the only sacking that Smith publicly regretted.

The album's title is taken from a review in The Boston Globe by Jim Sullivan of the band's 1994 album Middle Class Revolt.

There were long-standing rumours that an alternative, superior mix of this album existed, partly fuelled by Smith's statement in an interview released to the press on a promotional cassette that he and Karl Burns had re-recorded the guitars after the rest of the group had been ejected from the studio. This claim was later clarified by Smith in an interview included on the Castle Music reissue's bonus disc as referring only to opening track "The Joke". In Simon Ford's Hip Priest, Dave Bush was quoted as claiming to have been virtually erased from the album during the mixing process. The original "rough" mixes were included on the 2006 double-CD reissue by Castle Music and showed no major differences from the released version; the sound is harsher (possibly the result of being mastered from a copy of the cassette), but Bush is no more prominent.

The album again featured sleeve art by Pascal Le Gras. Brix Smith said of the artwork in her 2017 book The Rise, The Fall & the Rise:

"If that LP isn't the worst Fall album, it definitely has the worst cover art. When I see it now, the skull clown is Mark. It's prophetic. He looks like a fucking skull and he acts like a fucking clown. It's him. It's life imitating art and art imitating life".

== Reception ==
Professional ratings
Review scores
Source	Rating
AllMusic	3/5 stars
The Boston Globe	neutral
NME	4/10

Critical reception for Cerebral Caustic was mixed. Ned Raggett, reviewing it for AllMusic, gave it three stars, stating "Generally the band sounds like they're having a great time...Smith himself sounds a touch disconnected around the edges, but makes up for it with some interesting vocal treatments and sudden interjections to leaven things up." Jim Sullivan, reviewing the album for The Boston Globe, called it "another jagged pill from this long-churning engine of gleeful bile 'n' vitriol". John Harris, in the NME, gave it 4/10, saying the album "can't help but flip into moments that are worryingly generic" and that "the band sound unremarkable". Trouser Press viewed it as a "prime-slice Fall in all its caustic, cerebral glory. Rich with barbed hooklines and canny catch-phrases from a band that continues to refine its deliciously jagged edge, Cerebral Caustic is the best Fall album in years and a good omen for its future." The New Rolling Stone Album Guide describes Cerebral Caustic as "a furious return to noisy, reckless rant form".

== Track listing ==
No.	Title	Writer(s)	Length
1.	"The Joke"	Mark E. Smith, Brix Smith	2:49
2.	"Don't Call Me Darling"	M. Smith, Craig Scanlon	3:35
3.	"Rainmaster"	M. Smith, B. Smith	3:27
4.	"Feeling Numb"	M. Smith, B. Smith	2:45
5.	"Pearl City"	M. Smith, Karl Burns, Mike Bennett	2:46
6.	"Life Just Bounces"	M. Smith, Scanlon	4:47
7.	"I'm Not Satisfied"	Frank Zappa	2:56
8.	"The Aphid"	M. Smith, B. Smith, Scanlon, Steve Hanley, Simon Wolstencroft	2:46
9.	"Bonkers in Phoenix"	M. Smith, B. Smith	6:02
10.	"One Day"	M. Smith, Dave Bush	3:31
11.	"North West Fashion Show"	M. Smith, Burns	3:30
12.	"Pine Leaves"	M. Smith, Scanlon, Hanley, Burns	3:40

Japanese bonus tracks
No.	Title	Writer(s)	Length
13.	"Middle Class Revolt!" (The Prozac Mix)	M. Smith, Scanlon, Hanley	7:19
14.	"Middle Class Revolt!" (The Orange in the Mouth Mix)	M. Smith, Scanlon, Hanley	7:51

=== 2006 reissue ===
Disc one

- As per original UK release

Disc two

No.	Title	Writer(s)	Length
1.	"Glam Racket - Star" (John Peel Session, recorded 20 November 1994)	Smith, Scanlon, Hanley	3:23
2.	"Jingle Bell Rock" (John Peel Session, recorded 20 November 1994)	Joe Beal, Jim Boothe	1:10
3.	"Hark the Herald Angels Sing" (John Peel Session, recorded 20 November 1994)	Felix Mendelssohn, Charles Wesley; arranged by Smith	3:11
4.	"Numb at the Lodge" (John Peel Session, recorded 20 November 1994)	M. Smith, B. Smith	3:07
5.	"One Day" (pre-release rough mix)	M. Smith, Bush	3:36
6.	"Rainmaster" (pre-release rough mix)	M. Smith, B. Smith	3:34
7.	"Feeling Numb" (pre-release rough mix)	M. Smith, B. Smith	2:55
8.	"The Joke" (pre-release rough mix)	M. Smith, B. Smith	2:44
9.	"Don't Call Me Darling" (pre-release rough mix)	M. Smith, Scanlon	3:46
10.	"Pearl City" (pre-release rough mix)	M. Smith, Burns, Bennett	3:01
11.	"Life Just Bounces" (pre-release rough mix)	M. Smith, Scanlon	4:59
12.	"I'm Not Satisfied" (pre-release rough mix)	Zappa	3:19
13.	"The Aphid" (pre-release rough mix)	M. Smith, B. Smith, Scanlon, Hanley, Wolstencroft	2:57
14.	"Bonkers in Phoenix" (pre-release rough mix)	M. Smith, B. Smith	6:15
15.	"One Day" (Rex Sargeant mix)	M. Smith, Bush	3:37
16.	"Bonkers in Phoenix" (alternate mix)	M. Smith, B. Smith	6:21
17.	"Mark E. Smith and Brix Smith promo interview"		7:39

- Tracks 1–4 formed the group's 18th session for John Peel, a Christmas-themed session first broadcast within the same programme as a similarly festive session from Elastica, whom Dave Bush would join after his dismissal from the Fall. Tracks 5–14 are taken from the early mix of the album (see above), tracks 15 and 16 are alternate mixes and track 17 was a promotional item circulated around the time of the album's release.

== Personnel ==
The Fall

- Mark E. Smith – vocals, tapes, guitar on "The Joke", production
- Brix Smith – guitar, vocals
- Craig Scanlon – guitar
- Steve Hanley – bass guitar
- Simon Wolstencroft – drums, programming
- Karl Burns – guitar, percussion, backing vocals
- Dave Bush – keyboards, programming

Additional personnel

- Lucy Rimmer – backing vocals on "Pearl City"
- Mike Bennett – production
- Pascal Le Gras – cover art (Skull and Spike images)
- Valerie Philips – photography
- Ian Baldwin – sleeve design, layout
- Drum Club – remixing on Japanese bonus tracks
- James Birtwistle – production on Peel Sessions
- Paul Allen – engineering on Peel Sessions
