= Live 1977 =

Live album by The Fall

Live album by The Fall
- Released: March 2000
- Recorded: Civic Centre, Stretford, 23 December 1977
- Genre: Post-punk, punk rock, lo-fi
- Length: 46:53
- Label: Cog Sinister
- Producer: none

The Fall chronology
The Marshall Suite (1999)	Live 1977 (2000)	The Unutterable (2000)

Professional ratings
Review scores
Source	Rating
AllMusic	3.5/5 stars

Live 1977 is a live album by the Fall, first released in March 2000. Although the sound quality is poor and live documents of the Fall are plentiful, this album is of particular note as it is the earliest available recording of the group performing, apart from two tracks on the Short Circuit: Live at the Electric Circus compilation. It dates from December 1977, about six weeks after the group had recorded their debut single "Bingo-Master's Break-Out!" (which was not released until August 1978). It is the only release on which the early song "Hey! Fascist" may be heard, though it was reworked as "Hey! Student" and released on Middle Class Revolt 17 years later. Live 1977 also contains very early versions of the 1984 single and "Oh! Brother" and the song "Cop It", later found on The Wonderful and Frightening World Of... but retitled "Copped It". The group's reworking of "Louie Louie", with John the Postman, is featured only on this recording. This was Tony Friel's last performance with the band. After a couple of short-stay replacements, his place as bassist was taken by Marc Riley.

== Track listing ==
1. "Psycho Mafia"
2. "Last Orders"
3. "Repetition"
4. "Dresden Dolls"
5. "Hey! Fascist"
6. "Frightened"
7. "Industrial Estate"
8. "Stepping Out"
9. "Bingo-Master's Break-Out!"
10. "Oh! Brother"
11. "Cop It"
12. "Futures and Pasts"
13. "Louie Louie"

== Personnel ==
The Fall

  - Mark E. Smith - vocals
  - Martin Bramah - guitar, backing vocals
  - Tony Friel - bass guitar
  - Una Baines - keyboard
  - Karl Burns - drums
- John the Postman - vocals on "Louie Louie"
