= Middle Class Revolt =

Studio album by The Fall
- Released: 3 May 1994
- Recorded: late 1993-early 1994
- Studios: Suite 16, Rochdale; The Windings, Wrexham
- Genres: Alternative rock; post-punk
- Length: 50:08
- Labels: Permanent; Matador
- Producer: Rex Sargeant

The Fall chronology
The Infotainment Scan (1993)	Middle Class Revolt (1994)	Cerebral Caustic (1995)

Singles from Middle Class Revolt
- 1. "Behind the Counter" Released: 13 December 1993; 2. "15 Ways" Released: 18 April 1994

Middle Class Revolt is the sixteenth album by the Fall, released in 1994 in the UK on Permanent Records and in the US on Matador Records. It spent one week on the UK Albums Chart at number 48, a marked contrast to the top 10 debut of their preceding album, The Infotainment Scan. The album's full title is Middle Class Revolt A/K/A The Vapourisation Of Reality. Drummer Karl Burns features for the first time since 1985's This Nation's Saving Grace, having rejoined the band in 1993.

== Content ==
The album included two songs previously released as singles, "Behind the Counter" (December 1993 – UK no. 75) and "15 Ways" (April 1994 – UK no. 65), although different versions of both were included on the album. A further five tracks from the album featured as B-sides across the formats of these singles, and, although most were different versions, this meant that the album only contained seven songs that were new to fans upon its release, three of which were cover versions. In addition, "Hey! Student" is a reworked version of "Hey! Fascist", which The Fall used to play live in their early days (as shown by its inclusion on Live 1977). The version of "M5" included was considered inferior to the version released on the Behind the Counter EP in 1993.

The album's cover versions were less mainstream than some of their other recent choices: "War", originally by Henry Cow and Slapp Happy, "Shut Up!", originally by The Monks (whom The Fall had already covered twice on 1990's Extricate) and a bizarre version of "Junk Man", originally by The Groundhogs. According to Daryl Easlea's sleeve notes for the 2006 reissue, Mark E. Smith prevailed upon the group to deliver the song from memory and, as a result, was backed by minimal drums, bass, kazoo and some tuneless hollering from Burns. "Symbol of Mordgan" is based upon a recording of Scanlon discussing a football match by telephone on John Peel's Saturday afternoon programme.

Middle Class Revolt is, as Easlea notes, not a uniformly popular album amongst the group's fans. Nevertheless, it houses some popular tracks. Indeed, "Hey! Student" attained the number 2 position in John Peel's 1994 Festive Fifty, beaten to the top only by Inspiral Carpets' "I Want You", which featured Smith as guest vocalist.

== Reception ==
Professional ratings
Review scores
Source	Rating
AllMusic	3.5/5 stars
The Boston Globe	favourable
NME	7/10 (8/10)
The Washington Post	favourable

The album received a rating of 3.5 stars out of 5 from AllMusic, with Ted Mills describing it as "a mixture of lackluster performances and songs filled with vigor and fury". the NME's Ian McCann gave the album "7/10 by their own standards, 8/10 by everyone else's", calling the band "professionally incompetent, true punk artisans making masterpieces sound like demos". Jim Sullivan, for The Boston Globe, stated the album has "enough caustic barbs and wry witticisms snake through the dense mix to provide cerebral fun for those who like to carp along", going on to say "It's nasty, it's gleeful, it's the Fall still twisting the ironic/angry knife." Mark Jenkins, in The Washington Post, described it as "unusually smooth for an album by these veteran British post-punk eccentrics" viewing its highlights to be "its irascible mantras, notably the unusually quick-tempoed "Hey! Student" and the dense "Shut Up!"". Stereogum's Robert Ham viewed it as their "best album in at least five years".

== Track listing ==
The album was controversial for its writing credits, in which all Fall originals were credited to Mark E. Smith, Craig Scanlon and Steve Hanley, despite some of the tracks having already been credited differently on the preceding single releases. According to drummer Simon Wolstencroft (who claimed to have co-written "Middle Class Revolt" and "City Dweller"), there was "a misprint on the credits due to a cock-up at the record label".

All tracks are written by Mark E. Smith, Craig Scanlon and Steve Hanley, except where noted.

No.	Title	Writer(s)	Length
1.	"15 Ways"		3:16
2.	"The Reckoning"		3:37
3.	"Behind the Counter"	credited on the single release to Smith and Karl Burns	3:09
4.	"M5#1"	credited on "Behind the Counter" single to Smith, Dave Bush and Simon Wolstencroft	3:30
5.	"Surmount All Obstacles"		3:53
6.	"Middle Class Revolt!"		3:04
7.	"War"	Peter Blegvad, Anthony Moore	2:55
8.	"You're Not up to Much"	credited on BMI website to Smith and Scanlon	4:03
9.	"Symbol of Mordgan"		3:07
10.	"Hey! Student"	credited on The Complete Peel Sessions 1978–2004 to Smith	4:28
11.	"Junk Man"	Tony McPhee	4:20
12.	"The $500 Bottle of Wine"		2:33
13.	"City Dweller"		4:12
14.	"Shut Up!"	The Monks	3:39
Total length:			50:08

- Some CD editions erroneously list "War" as track 13, although the actual running order on CD is correct.
- There are also CD editions where "War" is in fact track 13, as listed on the CD.

=== 2006 edition ===
The album was remastered and reissued by Castle Music as an expanded two-disc set in 2006. The second disc included the group's 17th session for John Peel, alternate mixes of several album tracks previously issued on singles and a clutch of rare or previously unheard remixes.

Disc one

- As per original release

Disc two

All tracks are written by Smith, Scanlon and Hanley, except where noted.

No.	Title	Writer(s)	Length
1.	"M5" (Peel Session, 12 January 1994)		3:10
2.	"Behind the Counter" (Peel Session, 12 January 1994)		4:05
3.	"Reckoning" (Peel Session, 12 January 1994)		3:42
4.	"Hey! Student" (Peel Session, 12 January 1994)		4:12
5.	"Behind the Counter" (single mix)		3:12
6.	"War" (single mix; "Behind the Counter" B-side)	Blegvad, Moore	2:45
7.	"Cab Driver" ("Behind the Counter" B-side; an early version of "City Dweller")	Smith	5:23
8.	"M5" (single mix; "Behind the Counter" B-side)		3:29
9.	"Happy Holiday" ("Behind the Counter" B-side)	Smith, Hanley	3:27
10.	"Behind the Counter" (remix; "Behind the Counter" B-side)		3:08
11.	"15 Ways" (single mix)		2:55
12.	"Happy Holiday" (promo mix)	Smith, Hanley	3:26
13.	"Middle Class Revolt" (The Drum Club Prozac mix)		7:14
14.	"Middle Class Revolt" (The Drum ClubOrange in the Mouth mix)		7:52
15.	"Middle Class Revolt" (Rex Sargeant mix)		3:45
16.	"Surmount All Obstacles" (Rex Sargeant mix)		4:07
Total length:			65:52

== Personnel ==
The Fall

- Mark E. Smith – vocals, tapes
- Craig Scanlon – guitar, voice on "Symbol of Mordgan"
- Steve Hanley – bass guitar, backing vocals
- Simon Wolstencroft – drums, programming
- Karl Burns – drums, percussion, guitar, vocals, motorcycle on "You're Not Up to Much", kazoo on "Junk Man"
- Dave Bush – keyboards, programming, whistle, backing vocals

Additional personnel

- John Peel – voice on "Symbol of Mordgan"

Technical

- Rex Sargeant – production, engineering
- Alex Lee – assistant engineer
- Richard Wheelan – assistant engineer
- Pascal Le Gras – cover art
- Ian Baldwin – layout
