= The Big Midweek: Life Inside the Fall =

2014 autobiographical book by Steve Hanley with Olivia Piekarski

- Cover with early 1980s photograph; left to right: Mark E. Smith, Steve Hanley
- Author: Steve Hanley; Olivia Piekarski
- Language: English
- Genre: Autobiography
- Publisher: Route Publishing
- Publication date: 2014
- Publication place: United Kingdom
- ISBN: 978-1-9019-2758-0

The Big Midweek: Life Inside the Fall is the 2014 autobiography by the Irish-born, English rock bassist Steve Hanley, co-written with Olivia Piekarski and published by Route Publishing. Hanley was the long-term bass player and a core music writer in The Fall from 1979 to 1998, and is widely regarded for shaping the band's sound and inspiring many other bassists.

Despite his huge contribution to late 20th century alternative music, Hanley has shied from the limelight and has been rarely interviewed. The book received acclaim for its "brilliant" writing, "juicy details", and dry humour.

== Content ==
The autobiography emphasizes that Fall musicians were not interchangeable; within the band, Hanley was second only to the often tyrannical, founding vocalist Mark E. Smith in terms of longevity. Hanley wrote the music for over 100 songs across more than a dozen Fall albums; including the tracks "Rowche Rumble", "Fiery Jack", "Container Drivers", "Lie Dream of a Casino Soul", "Totally Wired", "Winter", "The N.W.R.A.", "I Am Damo Suzuki", "U.S. 80's-90's", "Carry Bag Man", "Jerusalem", "Van Plague?", "Yes, O Yes", "Bad News Girl", "Free Range", through to the 90s classics "Bill is Dead" and "Extricate".

The book details the Fall's steady rise to prominence in the late 1970 and early 80s, their songwriting techniques, Hanley’s approach to bass playing, and Smith's often acrimonious relationships with other core Fall members. It concludes in 1998, when Hanley walked off stage during an infamous incident after Smith interfered with his monitor settings, leading to a physical altercation.

== Reception ==
Hanley's autobiography has received widespread acclaim from music critics, literary critics, and fans. Speaking of the book's tone, co-writer Piekarski said, "We did have to have a winge-ometer when we were reading through the first draft”. Hanley wryly concedes that by the end of his tenure in the Fall he felt institutionalized, and that early drafts of the book had "more moaning than Morrissey".

== Sources ==
- Hanley, Steve. The Big Midweek: Life Inside the Fall. London: Route, 2014. ISBN 978-1-9019-2758-0
