= I Am Damo Suzuki =

1985 song by The Fall

Song by The Fall

from the album This Nation's Saving Grace
- Released: 23 September 1985
- Recorded: June–July 1985
- Studio: The Music Works, London
- Genre: Post-punk
- Length: 5:40
- Label: Beggars Banquet Records
- Songwriters: Mark E. Smith, Brix Smith, Karl Burns
- Producer: John Leckie

"I Am Damo Suzuki" is a song by the English post-punk band The Fall released on their 1985 album This Nation's Saving Grace. It was written in tribute to the Japanese vocalist Damo Suzuki of the Krautrock group Can, whom Fall vocalist Mark E. Smith consistently described as a major influence on The Fall.

Smith's lyrics evoke Suzuki's stage presence and singing style. The music was composed by guitarist Brix Smith and drummer Karl Burns. Described as spectral, the music is heavily influenced by the 1971 Can song "Oh Yeah", but also contains elements (especially the descending chords) of other Can tracks such as "Bel Air" (1973), "Gomorrah" (1974) and "Midnight Men" (1977).

The song was described in 2022 as a "hypnotic art-rock anthem befitting of [Can's] name", while in 2019 Suzuki biographer Paul Woods wrote that "MES took the 'Oh Yeah' riff and overrode it with a speed-freak surrealist tribute to Can and Damo himself while throwing in an oblique reference to Fritz Leiber, one of a number of supernatural horror authors who also obsessed him."

== Music and lyrics ==
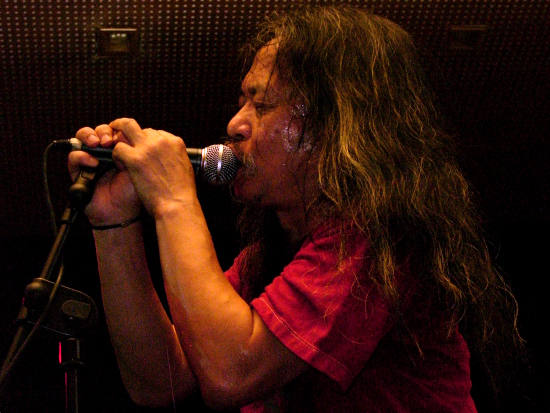
Suzuki performing in 2008

The lyrics were written by Fall vocalist Mark E. Smith. They describe Suzuki's personality, stage presence and at times mimic his singing style. Smith had earlier said that Suzuki's surrealistic lyrics and tendency to abandon language, and even have his vocals played backwards in the final mix (as on "Oh Yeah"), was a major influence on his writing and delivery style. Smith's opening lyrics: "Generous of lyric / Jehovah's Witness / Stands in Cologne Marktplatz / drums come in / When the drums come in fast / Drums to shock, into brass evil", evoke both his admiration for the older singer and the aggressive style of Can's drummer Jaki Liebezeit. Other lyrics such as "who is "Mr. Herr Stockhausen / Introduce me / I'm Damo Suzuki" indicate how listening to Can had broadened Smith's musical taste, while the word "What have you got in that paper bag? / Is it a dose of Vitamin C?" references the Can song Vitamin C, while the carrying sack was later evoked in the 1988 Fall song "Carry Bag Man" from The Frenz Experiment album.

The band recorded two separate takes during the sessions for This Nation's Saving Grace, but Smith and producer John Leckie could not agree on which one to use. Smith preferred the band's sound on the first take, but his vocal delivery on the second. As a solution, Leckie spliced parts of the vocals from the second onto the first. He said that "the two takes had different arrangements, like the verse and chorus came in at different times, so the whole thing gives the impression of being completely random". Because Smith was standing next to Burns during the recording of the vocals, there was inevitably sound leakage when the tapes were merged. According to Leckie, "the drums [were] coming through the vocal mix and every time the drums stop on the first take you can hear these ambient drums going on from the vocal mix on the second take and I thought it was fantastic and so did everyone else, but a totally unconventional way of doing it."

The band's guitarist Brix Smith and drummer Karl Burns wrote the rhythm-heavy music. The descending riff is based on the end section of "Bel Air" from the Can album Future Days, while Burns' drum pattern is based on "Oh Yeah" from Can's 1971 Tago Mago album. Brix said in 2017 that while it is one of her favourite songs she wrote for The Fall, "when I listen to it now I can hear my then technical weaknesses as a player, but in saying that I can also hear complete freedom and a certain creativity that might not have been captured had I played it perfectly".

== Reaction and influence ==
Fall bassist Steve Hanley said that he met Suzuki years later in a club, and that the singer had approached him with the words "I am Damo Suzuki", and after they had talked Hanley believed Suzuki "seemed pleased enough" with the song.

Smith and Suzuki had become friends and met a few times by 1985. In a 2010 interview, Suzuki said, "I know Mark E. He is Damo Suzuki as he is still singing this. I thought there is another Damo Suzuki in this world." Suzuki used the song's title for his 2019 autobiography I Am Damo Suzuki, describing the song as the "ultimate namecheck".

The American hip hop group Injury Reserve sampled parts of the song, mostly the keyboards, for their track "Ground Zero" which appears on their 2021 album By the Time I Get to Phoenix. In 2014 the English post-punk band Fat White Family released a song called "I Am Mark E Smith", in reference to the song.

== Personnel ==
The Fall

- Mark E. Smith – vocals
- Brix Smith – guitar
- Steve Hanley – bass guitar
- Craig Scanlon – guitar
- Karl Burns – drums
- Simon Rogers – keyboards

Technical

- John Leckie – production, engineering
- Joe Gillingham – engineering

== Sources ==
- Edge, Brian (1989). Paintwork: Portrait of The Fall. London: Omnibus Press. ISBN 978-0-7119-1740-8.
- Ford, Simon (2002). Hip Priest: The Story of Mark E.Smith and the Fall. London: Quartet Books. ISBN 978-0-7043-8167-4.
- Hanley, Steve (2014). The Big Midweek: Life Inside The Fall. London: Route. ISBN 978-1-9019-2758-0.
- Irvin, Jim, ed. (2017). The Mojo Collection: 4th Edition. London: Canongate Books. ISBN 978-1-8419-5973-3.
- Norton, Tessa; Stanley, Bob (2021). Excavate!: The Wonderful and Frightening World of The Fall. London: Faber & Faber. ISBN 978-0-5713-5833-5.
- Pringle, Steve (2022). You Must Get Them All: The Fall On Record. London: Route Publishing. ISBN 978-1-9019-2788-7.
- Smith, Brix (2017). The Rise, The Fall, and The Rise. London: Faber & Faber. ISBN 978-0-5713-2506-1.
- Suzuki, Damo; Woods, Paul (2019). I Am Damo Suzuki. Omnibus Press. ISBN 978-1-7830-5971-3.
