= The Wonderful and Frightening World Of... =

1984 studio album by the Fall

Studio album by the Fall
- Released: 8 October 1984 & 12 October 1984
- Recorded: Mid-1984
- Studios: Focus, London
- Genre: Post-punk
- Length: 40:09
- Label: Beggars Banquet
- Producer: John Leckie

The Fall chronology
| Perverted by Language (1983) | The Wonderful and Frightening World Of... (1984) | This Nation's Saving Grace (1985) |

The Wonderful and Frightening World Of... is the seventh studio album by the English musical group the Fall, released in October 1984. It was the band's first album after signing to the Beggars Banquet label. Newcomer Brix Smith co-wrote three of the tracks, ushering in a relatively pop-oriented sound for the group. Paul Hanley left the band immediately after the accompanying UK tour, ending the group's distinctive "twin drummers" period.

== Content ==
The album opens with the supernatural-themed "Lay of the Land", which starts with a chant taken from the television series The Quatermass Conclusion. One of three songs on the album co-written by Mark E. Smith and Brix Smith, it was described by Bob Nickas and Nikholis Planck in their book on the album as "sinister rockabilly with swirling guitars, doubled bass (Karl Burns also played bass on this song), double drums, and that killer riff from Brix". "2 x 4" features Steve Hanley's bass prominently, Nickas and Planck considering it the lead instrument on the song. "Copped It" (one of two songs on the album to feature guest vocals from Gavin Friday of the Virgin Prunes) continued Mark E. Smith's common lyrical theme of criticism of the music scene. The last song on side one, "Elves", bears a strong resemblance to the Stooges' "I Wanna Be Your Dog". Lyrically it was seen as chastising younger bands, with Mark E. Smith commenting that he was "trying to write about how shitty all Scottish groups are, and how Scottish groups always lecture everybody on how they are from Scotland, and how hard up they are."

Side two opens with "Slang King", which references "The Four of Us Are Dying", an episode of The Twilight Zone. "Bug Day" was seen as "revealing [Mark E.] Smith's interest in dub, and locking his band in a groove". "Stephen Song" is the second song to feature Gavin Friday. "Craigness" has one of Mark E. Smith's downstairs neighbours as its subject, although whether real or fictional is not clear. The album closes with "Disney's Dream Debased", inspired by an incident from the Smiths' visit to Disneyland in January 1984. After they got off the Matterhorn Bobsleds ride, Mark E. Smith was upset and decided the ride was evil; shortly afterwards a female passenger was thrown from the ride and decapitated by an oncoming car, with visitors comforted by employees dressed as Disney characters.

== Recording and release ==
The album was recorded in mid-1984 at Focus Studios on Borough High Street in London, and produced by John Leckie. The songs were largely recorded live in the studio. The recording sessions were so loud that Friday claimed that afterwards his "ears bled for days". Leckie commented on the recording sessions: "Mark would have a can of Special Brew, vodka, and a line of speed going at eleven in the morning, just to start the day."

Three older, previously abandoned songs were revisited during these sessions. "Oh! Brother" and "Copped It" dated back to the group's earliest incarnation (they can be heard on Live 1977 issued by Voiceprint Records in 2000), and "Draygo's Guilt" was being performed live in 1981 (it can be heard in the Live in Leeds section of the Perverted by Language Bis DVD, issued by Cherry Red in 2003).

The album's cover artwork (like that of its predecessor Perverted by Language) was painted by Danish-born artist Claus Castenskiold.

The album was released on 12 October 1984, with the Call for Escape Route EP released at the same time. The cassette version was titled Escape Route from the Wonderful and Frightening World of the Fall, and included tracks from the EP and singles released earlier in the year.

=== Reissues ===
The album was released on CD for the first time in 1988, with a similar tracklisting to the original cassette edition. A four-CD 'omnibus edition' box set edition was released in 2010, featuring outtakes, sessions, demos, and live recordings from the Pandora's Music Box Festival, and with a 48-page book included.

== Reception ==
Professional ratings
Review scores
| Source | Rating |
|---|---|
| AllMusic | 4.5/5 stars |
| Mojo | 4/5 stars |
| Pitchfork | 9.6/10 |
| Q | 4/5 stars |
| Record Collector | 3/5 stars |
| Record Mirror | 4/5 stars |
| The Rolling Stone Album Guide | 4/5 stars |
| Sounds | 4.5/5 stars |
| Spin Alternative Record Guide | 9/10 |
| Uncut | 9/10 |

Richard Cook, reviewing the album for the NME, praised it, stating, "They have their own world, which still has wonder and fright in it, and every time they play, the doors to it swing open." Andy Hurt, for Sounds, was equally positive, commenting, "The preferred line of attack remains insidious subversion, Mr. Smith's nasal nastiness doing its worst over that deceptively straightforward backing", and calling it "the ideal Christmas gift". Record Mirror's Andy Strike noted the album's "fresh, raw" sound and found that it "exudes a rare spirit." Trouser Press considered it to be "easily one of the band's best records".

Ned Raggett, in a retrospective AllMusic review, feels that the album is not aimed at the commercial market, describing Mark E. Smith's vocals in "Elves" as "audible, tape-distorting spit", Craig Scanlon's guitar work in "Lay of the Land" as "feedback ... over the clattering din" and Smith's lyrics in places as "coruscating and side-splittingly hilarious" and "portray[ing] a Disneyland scenario in hell"; overall his view is that it is a "smart, varied album".

Ryan Schreiber in a Pitchfork review described it as one of the highlights of the Fall's career full of "artsy and other-worldly" songs ranging from "bouncy and insane ... Sex Pistols-meets-Plastic Bertrand new-waviness" to "refreshing pop rock".

The album reached no. 62 on the UK Albums Chart in October 1984. NME ranked it number 14 among the "Albums of the Year" for 1984. In a 2018 list, Billboard selected it as the band's second best album, calling it "furiously catchy". It was voted number 973 in the third edition of Colin Larkin's All Time Top 1000 Albums (2000).

== Tour ==
The Fall embarked on a month-long tour to support the album release, playing to ever-growing audiences throughout the UK and Ireland. Things took a turn for the worse when in Cardiff the band's van was broken into and almost all the gear was stolen, including Brix Smith's rare Gretsch guitar (which would be recovered years later). After a lacklustre next day's show played on replacement gear hastily provided by Beggars Banquet Records, an argument exploded as a furious Mark E. Smith blamed the band for allowing the theft to happen. Fed up with Smith's treatment, Steve and Paul Hanley immediately left the band. This left The Fall with a single drummer and no bassist.

Both Hanleys were persuaded to return for a televised performance on The Old Grey Whistle Test, where The Fall played "Lay of the Land" accompanied by the Michael Clark Dance Company. Eventually, Brix talked Mark into making peace with Steve Hanley, whom she considered as the anchor and the most reliable person in the band. Steve Hanley's departure was then changed to a temporary leave, as he was under the additional stress of caring for his wife and newborn premature son. In the meantime, Simon Rogers filled in as temporary bassist. He was a classically trained musician whom Mark E. Smith met through mutual acquaintance Michael Clark. A capable multi-instrumentalist, Rogers remained in The Fall as a keyboardist/guitarist when Steve Hanley finally rejoined in May 1985.

== Track listing ==
Original UK LP

Side One ("Frightening" side)
| No. | Title | Writer(s) | Length |
|---|---|---|---|
| 1. | "Lay of the Land" | Mark E. Smith, Brix Smith | 5:44 |
| 2. | "2 × 4" | M. Smith, B. Smith | 3:38 |
| 3. | "Copped It" | M. Smith, Karl Burns | 4:15 |
| 4. | "Elves" | M. Smith, B. Smith | 4:48 |

Side Two ("Wonderful" side)
| No. | Title | Writer(s) | Length |
|---|---|---|---|
| 5. | "Slang King" | M. Smith, B. Smith, Paul Hanley | 5:21 |
| 6. | "Bug Day" | M. Smith, B. Smith, Craig Scanlon, Steve Hanley, Burns, P. Hanley | 4:58 |
| 7. | "Stephen Song" | M. Smith, S. Hanley, P. Hanley | 3:05 |
| 8. | "Craigness" | M. Smith, Scanlon | 3:03 |
| 9. | "Disney's Dream Debased" | M. Smith, B. Smith, S. Hanley | 5:18 |
| Total length: | | | 40:09 |

Cassette (titled Escape Route from the Wonderful and Frightening World of The Fall)

Side One
| No. | Title | Writer(s) | Length |
|---|---|---|---|
| 1. | "Lay of the Land" | M. Smith, B. Smith | 5:45 |
| 2. | "2 × 4" | M. Smith, B. Smith | 3:38 |
| 3. | "Copped It" | M. Smith, Burns | 4:15 |
| 4. | "Elves" | M. Smith, B. Smith | 4:47 |
| 5. | "Oh! Brother" (from the "Oh! Brother" single, June 1984) | M. Smith, Scanlon, S. Hanley, Burns | 4:01 |
| 6. | "Draygo's Guilt" (from the Call for Escape Route EP, 12 October 1984) | M. Smith, Scanlon | 4:29 |
| 7. | "God Box" (from the "Oh! Brother" single, June 1984) | M. Smith, B. Smith | 3:18 |
| 8. | "Clear Off!" (from the Call for Escape Route EP, 12 October 1984) | M. Smith, Scanlon | 4:40 |

Side Two
| No. | Title | Writer(s) | Length |
|---|---|---|---|
| 9. | "C.R.E.E.P." (from the 12" edition of the "c.r.e.e.p" single, 24 August 1984) | M. Smith, B. Smith, Scanlon, S. Hanley, P. Hanley | 4:42 |
| 10. | "Pat-Trip Dispenser" (from the "c.r.e.e.p" single, 24 August 1984) | M. Smith, B. Smith | 4:00 |
| 11. | "Slang King" | M. Smith, B. Smith, P. Hanley | 5:21 |
| 12. | "Bug Day" | M. Smith, B. Smith, Scanlon, S. Hanley, Burns, P. Hanley | 4:58 |
| 13. | "Stephen Song" | M. Smith, S. Hanley, P. Hanley | 3:05 |
| 14. | "Craigness" | M. Smith, Scanlon | 3:03 |
| 15. | "Disney's Dream Debased" | M. Smith, B. Smith, S. Hanley | 5:18 |
| 16. | "No Bulbs" (from the Call for Escape Route EP, 12 October 1984) | M. Smith, B. Smith | 7:51 |
| Total length: | | | 73:32 |

Original US Version (PVC/Beggars Banquet)

Side One
| No. | Title | Writer(s) | Length |
|---|---|---|---|
| 1. | "Lay of the Land" | M. Smith, B. Smith | 5:44 |
| 2. | "2 × 4" | M. Smith, B. Smith | 3:36 |
| 3. | "Copped It" | M. Smith, Burns | 4:16 |
| 4. | "Elves" | M. Smith, B. Smith | 4:48 |
| 5. | "C.R.E.E.P." (from B-side of the 12" edition of the "c.r.e.e.p" single, 24 August 1984) | M. Smith, B. Smith, Scanlon, S. Hanley, P. Hanley | 4:40 |

Side Two
| No. | Title | Writer(s) | Length |
|---|---|---|---|
| 6. | "No Bulbs 3" (from the 7" bonus included with the Call for Escape Route EP, 12 October 1984) | M. Smith, B. Smith | 4:30 |
| 7. | "Slang King" (from the 7" bonus included with the Call for Escape Route EP, 12 October 1984) | M. Smith, B. Smith, P. Hanley | 5:21 |
| 8. | "Bug Day" | M. Smith, B. Smith, Scanlon, S. Hanley, Burns, P. Hanley | 4:58 |
| 9. | "Stephen Song" | M. Smith, S. Hanley, P. Hanley | 3:04 |
| 10. | "Craigness" | M. Smith, Scanlon | 3:04 |
| 11. | "Disney's Dream Debased" | M. Smith, B. Smith, S. Hanley | 5:17 |
| Total length: | | | 49:18 |

1988 CD edition

The album was belatedly issued on CD in 1988. The track listing duplicated the content and running order of the cassette edition almost exactly, substituting the extended "C.R.E.E.P." for the 7" version, although it added a brief spoken introduction by Brix Smith unheard elsewhere. (The running time for this version of "C.R.E.E.P." is 3:08; all other running times listed above for the cassette apply to the CD version.) The CD was not, however, given the cassette's extended title.

=== 2010 4CD Omnibus Edition ===
Disc 1 - The Wonderful and Frightening World Of...The Fall

- as per original UK LP

Disc 2 - Singles and rough mixes
| No. | Title | Writer(s) | Length |
|---|---|---|---|
| 1. | "Oh! Brother" (from the "Oh! Brother" single) | M. Smith, Scanlon, S. Hanley, Burns | 4:02 |
| 2. | "God-Box" (from the "Oh! Brother" single,) | M. Smith, B. Smith | 3:22 |
| 3. | "O! Brother" (from the 12" edition of the "Oh! Brother" single) | M. Smith, Scanlon, S. Hanley, Burns | 4:19 |
| 4. | "c.r.e.e.p." (from the "c.r.e.e.p" single) | M. Smith, B. Smith, Scanlon, S. Hanley, P. Hanley | 3:10 |
| 5. | "Pat-Trip Dispenser" (from the "c.r.e.e.p" single) | M. Smith, B. Smith | 4:01 |
| 6. | "C.R.E.E.P." (from the 12" edition of the "c.r.e.e.p" single) | M. Smith, B. Smith, Scanlon, S. Hanley, P. Hanley | 4:43 |
| 7. | "New Fiend (2 By 4)" (previously unreleased) | M. Smith, B. Smith | 3:36 |
| 8. | "No Bulbs 3" (un-edited) (previously unreleased) | M. Smith, B. Smith | 5:02 |
| 9. | "Slang King 2" (from the Call for Escape Route EP) | M. Smith, B. Smith, P. Hanley | 5:16 |
| 10. | "Draygo's Guilt" (from the Call for Escape Route EP) | M. Smith, Scanlon | 4:31 |
| 11. | "Clear Off!" (from the Call for Escape Route EP) | M. Smith, Scanlon | 4:43 |
| 12. | "No Bulbs" (from the Call for Escape Route EP) | M. Smith, B. Smith | 7:50 |
| 13. | "Lay of the Land" (rough mix) (previously unreleased) | M. Smith, B. Smith | 4:17 |
| 14. | "Pat-Trip Dispenser" (rough mix) (previously unreleased) | M. Smith, B. Smith | 4:05 |
| 15. | "New Fiend" (rough mix) (previously unreleased) | M. Smith, B. Smith | 3:39 |
| 16. | "Slang King" (edits version one) (previously unreleased) | M. Smith, B. Smith, P. Hanley | 5:57 |
| Total length: | | | 72:34 |

Disc 3 - BBC radio sessions
| No. | Title | Writer(s) | Length |
|---|---|---|---|
| 1. | "Creep" (Peel session; recorded 12 December 1983) | M. Smith, B. Smith, Scanlon, S. Hanley, P. Hanley | 2:37 |
| 2. | "Pat-Trip Dispenser" (Peel session; recorded 12 December 1983) | M. Smith, B. Smith | 4:11 |
| 3. | "2 by 4" (Peel session; recorded 12 December 1983) | M. Smith, B. Smith | 4:18 |
| 4. | "Words of Expectation" (Peel session; recorded 12 December 1983) | M. Smith, B. Smith, Burns, S. Hanley, P. Hanley (Note: Alternatively credited on the 1993 Kimble EP to M. Smith, Scanlon and S. Hanley.) | 9:17 |
| 5. | "God Box" (Jensen session; recorded 12 February 1984) | M. Smith, B. Smith | 2:48 |
| 6. | "Lay of the Land" (Jensen session; recorded 12 February 1984) | M. Smith, B. Smith | 3:59 |
| 7. | "Oh Brother" (Jensen session; recorded 12 February 1984) | M. Smith, Scanlon, S. Hanley, Burns | 3:50 |
| 8. | "Creep" (Jensen session; recorded 12 February 1984) | M. Smith, B. Smith, Scanlon, S. Hanley, P. Hanley | 2:51 |
| 9. | "No Bulbs" (Long session; recorded 9 September 1984) | M. Smith, B. Smith | 4:20 |
| 10. | "Draygo's Guilt" (Long session; recorded 9 September 1984) | M. Smith, Scanlon | 4:49 |
| 11. | "Stephen Song" (Long session; recorded 9 September 1984) | M. Smith, S. Hanley, P. Hanley | 3:17 |
| 12. | "Slang King" (Long session; recorded 9 September 1984) | M. Smith, B. Smith, P. Hanley | 6:25 |
| 13. | "Copped It" (Saturday Live; recorded 29 September 1984) | M. Smith, Burns | 5:59 |
| 14. | "Elves" (Saturday Live; recorded 29 September 1984) | M. Smith, B. Smith | 4:10 |
| 15. | "Fortress/Marquis Cha Cha" (Saturday Live; recorded 29 September 1984) | M. Smith, Scanlon, Marc Riley, Burns/M. Smith, Burns | 5:57 |
| Total length: | | | 68:50 |

Disc 4 - Live at Pandora's Music Box Festival
| No. | Title | Writer(s) | Length |
|---|---|---|---|
| 1. | "Lay of the Land" (live) | M. Smith, B. Smith | 5:02 |
| 2. | "Craigness" (live) | M. Smith, Scanlon | 3:09 |
| 3. | "2 by 4" (live) | M. Smith, B. Smith | 3:41 |
| 4. | "Draygo's Guilt" (live) | M. Smith, Scanlon | 5:14 |
| 5. | "No Bulbs" (live) | M. Smith, B. Smith | 6:00 |
| 6. | "Kicker Conspiracy" (live) | M. Smith | 5:03 |
| 7. | "Stephen Song" (live) | M. Smith, S. Hanley, P. Hanley | 4:22 |
| 8. | "Copped It" (live) | M. Smith, Burns | 7:22 |
| 9. | "Pat-Trip Dispenser" (live) | M. Smith, B. Smith | 4:25 |
| 10. | "Middle Mass" (live) | M. Smith, Scanlon, Riley, S. Hanley, P. Hanley | 6:01 |
| Total length: | | | 50:47 |

- Disc 4 recorded live by VPRO at Pandora's Music Box Festival, De Doelen, Rotterdam 22 September 1984.

== Personnel ==
The Fall

- Mark E. Smith – vocals, tapes
- Brix Smith – lead and rhythm guitar, vocals
- Craig Scanlon – lead and rhythm guitar, backing vocals
- Steve Hanley – bass guitar, backing vocals; acoustic guitar on 'Disney's Dream Debased'
- Karl Burns – drums, percussion, backing vocals; additional bass guitar on 'Lay of the Land' and 'Pat-Trip Dispenser'
- Paul Hanley – drums, keyboards, guitar, backing vocals; grand piano on "Clear Off!"

Additional musicians

- Gavin Friday – vocals on "Copped It", "Stephen Song" and "Clear Off!" (credited as a "friendly visitor")

Technical

- John Leckie – production, backing vocals on "Lay of the Land"
- Joe Gillingham – engineering
- Claus Castenskiold – cover painting

Bonus tracks

- Mark E. Smith – production on "Slang King (edits version one)" and "Slang King 2"
- Brix Smith – production on "Slang King (edits version one)" and "Slang King 2"

BBC radio sessions

- Dale Griffin – production (David 'Kid' Jensen and Janice Long)
- Mike Engles – engineering (David 'Kid' Jensen and Janice Long)
- Tony Wilson – production (John Peel)
- Martin Colley – engineering (John Peel)
- Mark Radcliffe – production (Saturday Live)
- Mike Walter – engineering (Saturday Live)

== Sources ==
- Nickas, Bob & Planck, Nikholis (2014) The Wonderful and Frightening World of...the Fall, Karma, New York, ISBN 978-1-938560-65-1
