= Mike Bennett (writer) =

British writer (born 1962)

- Born: 1962 (age 63–64); Cheltenham, England
- Origin: United Kingdom
- Occupations: Record producer; writer
- Label: Cryptic Records

Mike Bennett (born 1962 in Cheltenham, England) is a British writer and record producer. His first involvement with the music industry came when he was asked to write and produce Toyah Willcox's Dreamchild and "Out of the Blue". The songs were released on Cryptic Records and featured collaborations.

== Career ==
=== Early years ===
Bennett has been writing since he was 16 and received his first commission for the BBC at the age of 17 from producer Ted Beston. During this period, he wrote for Playground (BBC Radio 1 & BBC Radio 2) and Show (Radio 1). He also wrote and co-starred in the children’s series "Bill Wonder" alongside Maggie Philbin on Radio 2.

=== 1980s and 1990s ===
He subsequently co-wrote and produced Hazel O'Connor's album Ignite in 2002, as well as co-writing Hidden for Hazel O'Connor and Clannad's Moya Brennan. Throughout the 1980s and 1990s, Bennett continued to produce artists, including Bad Manners, Hazell Dean, and Diane Charlemagne.

Bennett also co-wrote and produced with Kim Fowley. During this period, the sessions culminated in the albums "Let the Madness In" and "Trip of a Lifetime". The latter album featured collaboration with William Orbit and Teenage Fanclub. He produced the album "Hidden Agenda At the Thirteenth Not" for Kim Fowley and the BMX Bandits (band).

He produced and co-wrote several albums for The Fall, including The Light User Syndrome. in 1996 and Northern Attitude in 1998.

Bennett produced albums for Wishbone Ash, including Timeline (1997), Live in Japan, (2019) as well as co-writing and producing Trance Visionary (1997) and Psychic Terrorism. in 1999.

Whilst working as an in house producer Bennett produced and remixed several artists including The Specials, The Selecter, Dennis Brown, and Desmond Dekker, and collaborated with the dubplate of Bionic Rats which was first featured on the Trojan Jungle series. Bennett also remixed several Bob Marley and the Wailers tracks including "Soul Shakedown Party" and "Mr. Brown," which were featured on the Bob Marley compilation Behind the Legend.

Other remixes during this period include "Too Much Too Young" by The Specials and "A Train to Skaville" by The Selecter. He worked for producer Mike Jackson as a scriptwriter in residence at Children’s ITV.

=== Playwright ===
Bennett worked as a playwright at the Mermaid Theatre, where he wrote Safety In Numbers and It's All In The Stars, the latter with astronomer Nigel Henbest. Both these children’s plays made national tours, as well as running in the west end at The Mermaid Theatre and The Arts Theatre. He also wrote for the Unicorn Theatre Company.

He has written and co-written many plays and farces which have been seen at theatres such as Crucible Theatre in Sheffield, Harlow Playhouse, Derby Playhouse, and the Edinburgh Playhouse.

Bennett wrote Bedtime Stories, a series of audio-books for Rik Mayall. They would be the last recorded work Mayall ever did and were released in 2017. They include Three Little Pigs, The Gingerbread Man, Beauty & The Beast and Sinbad The Sailor.

=== Singer ===
Bennett joined The Blockheads in May 2022 as lead vocalist, replacing the late Derek "The Draw" Hussey.
