= Levitate (The Fall album) =

Studio album by the Fall
- Released: 29 September 1997
- Recorded: Mid-1997
- Studios: West Heath Studios, London; Beethoven Street Studios, London; PWL Studios, Manchester
- Genre: Alternative rock
- Length: 49:35
- Label: Artful Records
- Producer: Mark E. Smith

The Fall chronology
The Light User Syndrome (1996)	Levitate (1997)	The Marshall Suite (1999)

Singles from Levitate
- 1. "Masquerade" Released: 9 February 1998

Professional ratings
Review scores
Source	Rating
AllMusic	4/5 stars
NME	8/10

Levitate is the 19th album by the Fall, released in 1997 on Artful Records. Levitate became the last album to feature two long-time Fall members, drummer Karl Burns and bass player Steve Hanley (whose playing was once described by Smith as the defining element of the group's music).

The album remained out of print for a long time, as Artful went bankrupt in the early 2000s. An expanded, remastered 2CD/3LP version of the album was released by Cherry Red Records in May 2018.

== Recording background ==
Levitate was recorded amidst a difficult period for the group, described by personnel turmoil and Mark E. Smith's increasingly erratic behaviour, as well as financial troubles due to a VAT bill incurred in the 1980s and early 1990s for nearly £200,000.

The album was initially going to be produced by Keir Stewart and Simon Spencer (who previously collaborated with Smith under the moniker D.O.S.E. on the 1995 single "Plug Myself In"). Most of the recordings took place at Edwyn Collins's studio in West Hampstead. However, Stewart and Spencer soon fell out with Smith over payments and left after a week, taking most of the tapes with them. The only tracks from these sessions to make the album were "4½ Inch" (allegedly edited out of samples of a rehearsal recording), "Spencer", later re-dubbed by Smith as "Spencer Must Die", and "The Quartet of Doc Shanley".

Drummer Simon Wolstencroft left after a disagreement about the recording of "Everybody But Myself". His departure also stemmed from long-simmering tensions with Smith's increasingly erratic personality, and after having received financial advice about the group's VAT bill. Thus, Wolsencroft quit the band as a drummer, and also resigned from being a co-director of the Fall as a business. Karl Burns, who was previously fired in 1996 after the release of The Light User Syndrome, was brought back in to replace Wolstencroft. Julia Nagle programmed computers using Logic Audio software, played guitar and keyboards on most of Levitate, and contributed vocals on songs "Doc Shanley's Quartet", "I'm A Mummy" and B-side "Scareball". Scottish artist Tommy Crooks joined the group towards the end of recording sessions as a guitarist.

The album features two covers – "I'm a Mummy", by Bob McFadden & Dor, and "Jungle Rock", by Hank Mizell – as well as an interpretation of the song "I Come and Stand At Every Door", based on a poem by Nazım Hikmet and a traditional tune, previously performed by Pete Seeger, The Misunderstood and The Byrds ("Jap Kid" is an instrumental version of this track). Another track, "Tragic Days", is a poorly recorded fragment of a jam session at Martin Bramah's flat back in 1990, when Bramah still played in the Fall.

"Masquerade" was remixed from the album version and released as a single in February 1998 to coincide with the group's leader Mark E. Smith receiving the Godlike Genius award at the NME Awards. Julia Nagle's young son Basil contributed a spoken part on the single version. It reached number 69 in the UK charts. The "Masquerade" sessions also produced a b-side "Calendar", a collaboration with then-unknown Damon Gough (aka Badly Drawn Boy) which came about after a chance meeting when Smith allegedly mistook Gough's car for a taxi outside the pub.

The album was followed by another shambolic tour. Smith sacked the whole group in Ireland in November, although they were re-instated within days. The situation was caused by the group's sudden debt crisis because of the VAT bill, which left Smith and Steve Hanley in danger of their houses being repossessed. It was during the US tour in 1998 that the group essentially fell apart, leaving Smith with only Nagle's support in rebuilding the group for their next album The Marshall Suite.

== Track listing ==
No.	Title	Writer(s)	Length
1.	"Ten Houses of Eve"	Mark E. Smith, Julia Nagle	3:39
2.	"Masquerade"	Smith, Nagle (Note: Credited on the single release to Smith, Nagle, Hanley, Burns.)	3:58
3.	"Hurricane Edward"	Smith, Nagle	5:52
4.	"I'm a Mummy"	Rod McKuen (Note: Credited on the album to "Unknown".)	2:37
5.	"The Quartet of Doc Shanley"	Smith, Hanley	3:14
6.	"Jap Kid"	Nagle	3:03
7.	"4½ Inch"	Smith, Hanley	3:56
8.	"Spencer Must Die"	Smith, Simon Spencer	4:00
9.	"Jungle Rock"	Hank Mizell	3:11
10.	"Ol' Gang"	Smith, Hanley, Simon Wolstencroft	4:00
11.	"Tragic Days"	Smith, Martin Bramah	1:29
12.	"I Come and Stand at Your Door"	Nagle, Nâzım Hikmet (Note: Credited on the album to Anon, Nagle.)	3:31
13.	"Levitate"	Smith, Nagle	2:50
14.	"Everybody But Myself"	Smith, Wolstencroft	4:15
Total length:			49:35

=== Limited edition bonus disc ===
The first CD edition came with an additional 5-song disc of outtakes and alternate mixes spanning the group's career.

No.	Title	Writer(s)	Length
1.	"Powderkex"	Smith, Burns, Nagle	3:17
2.	"Christmastide"	Smith, Wolstencroft, Craig Scanlon	3:44
3.	"Recipe for Fascism"	Smith	1:03
4.	"Pilsner Trail" (live)	Smith, Hanley (Note: On the 1998 and 2005 Perverted by Language reissues, the song is credited to either the whole group or Smith, Burns, Scanlon.)	5:20
5.	"Everybody But Myself" (live)	Smith, Wolstencroft	3:04
Total length:			16:28

- Track 1 is a remix (by Julia Adamson a.k.a. Nagle) of "Powder Keg" from The Light User Syndrome; first released in 1997 on the various artists compilation album 0161.
- Track 2 is a remix of "Xmas With Simon", a b-side from the 1990 single "High Tension Line".
- Track 3 is a lo-fi spoken word piece by Smith that was planned to be the title track of the album which became Levitate.
- Track 4 is a live recording from 1983. A studio version of this song was released in 1998 on the expanded reissue of Perverted By Language.
- Track 5 was recorded live 14 May 1997 at Jilly's Rockworld in Manchester. A portion of this same live recording precedes the album version. The song was later reworked as "On My Own" on The Marshall Suite.

=== 2018 reissue ===
Disc 1

- As per original CD

Disc 2

No.	Title	Writer(s)	Length
1.	"Powderkex" (0161 and Levitate bonus disc)	Smith, Burns	3:17
2.	"Christmastide" (Levitate bonus disc)	Smith, Wolstencfroft, Scanlon	3:44
3.	"Recipe for Fascism" (Levitate bonus disc)	Smith	1:03
4.	"Pilsner Trail" (live) (Levitate bonus disc)	Smith, Hanley	5:20
5.	"Everybody But Myself" (live) (Levitate bonus disc)	Smith, Wolstencroft	3:04
6.	"Masquerade" (single mix)	Smith, Nagle	3:53
7.	"Ivanhoe's Two Pence" ("Masquerade" single B-side)	Smith, Burns, Hanley, Nagle	4:07
8.	"Spencer Must Die" (live) ("Masquerade" single B-side)	Smith, Spencer	2:18
9.	"Ten Houses of Eve" (remix) ("Masquerade" single B-side)	Smith, Nagle	3:44
10.	"Calendar" ("Masquerade" single B-side)	Smith, Damon Gough	1:44
11.	"Scareball" ("Masquerade" single B-side)	Smith, Burns, Hanley, Nagle	2:55
12.	"Ol' Gang" (live) ("Masquerade" single B-side)	Smith, S. Hanley, Wolstencroft	5:22
13.	"Masquerade" (Mr Natural mix) ("Masquerade" single B-side)	Smith, Nagle	7:07
14.	"Masquerade" (PWL mix) ("Masquerade" single B-side)	Smith, Nagle	4:00
Total length:			51:44

== Personnel ==
The Fall

- Mark E. Smith – vocals, keyboards, guitar, production
- Julia Nagle – keyboards, guitar, programming, arranging; vocals on "The Quartet of Doc Shanley"
- Steve Hanley – bass guitar
- Simon Wolstencroft – drums
- Karl Burns – drums
- Tommy Crooks – guitar on "Ten Houses of Eve", "Masquerade", "Jungle Rock" and "Everybody But Myself", voice on "Hurricane Edward" (outro), cover photography

Additional personnel

- Andy Hackett – guitar; backing vocals on "I'm a Mummy"
- Brix Smith – voice sample ("this is new, fresh, fresh out of the womb") on "Masquerade" (uncredited; from Brix's final performance with the Fall at the Forum, London, 11 October 1996)
- Martin Bramah – guitar on "Tragic Days" (uncredited)
- Craig Scanlon – guitar on "Tragic Days" (uncredited)
- Damon Gough – guitar on "Calendar"
- Basil Nagle – spoken part on "Masquerade" (single mix)

Technical

- Sebastian Lewsley – engineering, voice on "Hurricane Edward"
- Jason Barron – engineering; co-production on "Masquerade" single tracks
- Richie Reed – engineering
- Ollie Maxwell – engineering
- Xor – mastering
- Venus – design
