= The Light User Syndrome =

Studio album by The Fall
- Released: 10 June 1996
- Recorded: 1995–1996
- Studio: The Dairy, London
- Genre: Alternative rock
- Length: 59:30
- Label: Jet
- Producer: Mike Bennett; Mark E. Smith

The Fall chronology
The Twenty-Seven Points (1995)	The Light User Syndrome (1996)	Levitate (1997)

Professional ratings
Review scores
Source	Rating
AllMusic	3/5 stars
NME	7/10
Trouser Press	favourable

The Light User Syndrome is the 18th album by the Fall, released in 1996 on Jet Records. It was the group's first album to feature keyboard player and guitarist Julia Nagle and the last to feature Brix Smith, while longtime guitarist Craig Scanlon was fired in late 1995 during troubled recording sessions for "The Chiselers" single which preceded the album. A version of "The Chiselers" is included on the album as "Interlude/Chilinism".

Brix Smith told Simon Ford that The Light User Syndrome was recorded very quickly, with frontman Mark E. Smith absent for much of the recording, performing most of his vocals on the final day in studio. Although Julia Nagle remembers recording the vocals took more than a week, Smith himself claimed half the vocals were actually just guide vocals, which he found had been mixed as the final vocals when he took a day off from the studio. Despite this, alternate versions of many of the album's tracks featured heavily across the series of compilation albums issued by the Receiver label in the late 1990s. The album also features some vocals from producer Mike Bennett, as well as a rare lead vocal from drummer and guitarist Karl Burns on a cover version of Johnny Paycheck's "Stay Away (Ol' White Train)." The album's second cover version, "Last Chance to Turn Around", was a Top 20 hit for Gene Pitney in 1965.

The tour supporting the album was disastrous due to Smith's heavy drinking and misbehaviour, with Brix walking out of the group after the soundcheck at Motherwell Concert Hall (although she would return for one last gig at The Forum in London) and a gig in Worthing being declared by long-serving bassist Steve Hanley to be the worst Fall gig ever. By the end of the year, they were playing without Brix and Burns, (Julia Nagle took one Christmas concert off to be with her son). Burns would return during 1997 for follow-up album Levitate.

== Track listing ==
No.	Title	Writer(s)	Length
1.	"D.I.Y. Meat"	Mark E. Smith, Brix Smith	2:37
2.	"Das Vulture ans ein Nutter-Wain"	M. Smith, Steve Hanley	3:00
3.	"He Pep!"	M. Smith, Simon Wolstencroft	3:07
4.	"Hostile"	M. Smith, B. Smith	3:59
5.	"Stay Away (Old White Train)"	Johnny Paycheck	2:49
6.	"Spinetrak"	M. Smith, B. Smith	3:08
7.	"Interlude/Chilinism"	M. Smith, Karl Burns, Hanley, Wolstencroft, Julia Nagle, Mike Bennett	7:05
8.	"Powder Keg"	M. Smith, Burns	3:16
9.	"Oleano"	M. Smith	3:08
10.	"Cheetham Hill"	M. Smith, Wolstencroft, Bennett	3:31
11.	"The Coliseum"	M. Smith, Simon Spencer	8:08
12.	"Last Chance to Turn Around"	Vic Milrose, Tony Bruno, Bob Elgin	3:24
13.	"The Ballard of J. Drummer"	M. Smith	3:21
14.	"Oxymoron"	M. Smith, Nagle	4:02
15.	"Secession Man"	M. Smith, Burns, Bennett	4:49
Total length:			59:30

1999 and 2002 reissue bonus tracks
No.	Title	Writer(s)	Length
16.	"The Chiselers" (single A-side, 1996)	M. Smith, Burns, Hanley, Wolstencroft, Nagle	3:14
17.	"Chilinist" (single B-side)	M. Smith, Burns, Hanley, Wolstencroft, Nagle, Bennett	6:15
Total length:			68:59

=== 2022 Deluxe Edition reissue ===
Disc 1

- As per original CD

Disc 2

No.	Title	Writer(s)	Length
1.	"The Chiselers" (single A-side, 1996)	M. Smith, Burns, Hanley, Wolstencroft, Nagle	3:14
2.	"Chilinist" (single B-side)	M. Smith, Burns, Hanley, Wolstencroft, Nagle, Bennett	6:15
3.	"Hostile" (alternate version)	M. Smith, B. Smith	4:13
4.	"Oleano" (alternate version)	M. Smith	5:18
5.	"Italiano" (outtake)	M. Smith	3:25
6.	"He Pep!" (alternate version)	M. Smith, Wolstencroft	3:20
7.	"Interlude/Chilinism" (alternate version)	M. Smith, Burns, Hanley, Wolstencroft, Nagle, Bennett	9:33
8.	"D.I.Y. Meat" (live at the Astoria, London on 26 June 1996)	M. Smith, B. Smith	3:00
9.	"Spinetrak" (live)	M. Smith, B. Smith	2:42
10.	"Das Vulture Ans Ein Nutter-Wain" (live at the Astoria, London on 26 June 1996)	M. Smith, Hanley	3:15
11.	"The Coliseum" (live)	M. Smith, Spencer	4:44
12.	"Chilinist" (live at the Astoria, London on 26 June 1996)	M. Smith, Wolstencroft, Burns, Hanley, Nagle, Bennett	7:31
Total length:			56:47

Note

- On early copies of the album, "The Ballard of J. Drummer" was misprinted as "The Ballad of J. Drummer".

== Reissues ==
The album has been reissued three times, firstly by Receiver in 1999 and then by Castle Music in 2002. Both of these editions added "The Chiselers" single as well as its B-side "Chilinist". Iconoclassic Records released a 2 CD deluxe edition in 2022 with 12 bonus tracks, including "The Chiselers, "Chilinist," alternate versions and mixes, and live material.

== Personnel ==
The Fall

- Mark E. Smith – vocals, tapes, keyboards, production
- Brix Smith – guitar, vocals
- Steve Hanley – bass guitar
- Simon Wolstencroft – drums, programming
- Karl Burns – drums, guitar, keyboards, lead vocals on "Stay Away", backing vocals on "Interlude/Chilinism"
- Julia Nagle – keyboards, programming, guitar (listed as "Julie" on some editions)

Additional personnel

- Lucy Rimmer – backing vocals
- Mike Bennett – production, vocals on "Interlude/Chilinism" and "Cheetham Hill"
- Warren Bassett – engineering
- Denis Blackham – mastering
- Phil Rogers – sleeve design
- Pete Cronin – photography
