= Grotesque (After the Gramme) =

Studio album by The Fall
- Released: 17 November 1980
- Studio: Cargo Studios, Rochdale; Street Level Studios, London
- Genre: Post-punk; art punk
- Length: 41:21
- Label: Rough Trade
- Producer: The Fall; Geoff Travis; Grant Showbiz; Mayo Thompson

The Fall chronology
Totale's Turns (It's Now or Never) (1980)	Grotesque (After the Gramme) (1980)	Slates (1981)

Grotesque (After the Gramme) is the third studio album by the English band the Fall. Released on 17 November 1980, it was the band's first studio album on Rough Trade.

The album reached number one on the UK Independent Chart, spending 29 weeks on the chart in total.

== Background and recording ==
This was the first album for drummer Paul Hanley (Steve Hanley's younger brother), who joined the Fall earlier in the year, aged 15. Kay Carroll, the group's manager, played kazoo on "New Face in Hell" and added backing vocals. Grotesque was recorded at Cargo Studios in Rochdale and Street Level in London, with production by the group and Grant Showbiz, Geoff Travis and Mayo Thompson.

The album was preceded by two acclaimed singles, "How I Wrote 'Elastic Man'" and "Totally Wired", which were included on CD reissues of the album. The colour sleeve (the group's first) was drawn by Smith's sister, Suzanne.

According to the Slates & Dates press release, this album was, at one point, to be titled After the Gramme – The Grotesque Peasants.

== Content ==
The Fall's music at the time was described as "Mancabilly", and by Smith himself as "Country 'n' Northern". The album opens with "Pay Your Rates", the lyric described as one that "excoriates small-minded conformity". Second track "English Scheme" was seen as Smith "sneering at the middle class liberals". "New Face in Hell" takes its name from the 1968 film P. J. which was retitled New Face in Hell in the UK. It has been described as "a paranoid tale of sinister government agencies 'disappearing' innocent amateur radio hams". "C'n'C–S Mithering" was seen by AllMusic reviewer Ned Raggett as "a brilliant vivisection of California and its record business, and the attendant perception of the Fall themselves", and by Stereogum's Robert Ham as "his sprawling screed at the vapidity of the music industry". The song makes reference to the band's meeting with A&M Records co-founder Herb Alpert ("big A&M Herb was there") while seeking an American record deal. Side one closes with "The Container Drivers", which Al Spicer described as "[shattering] the stereotype of the noble trucker, depicting a world of loudmouthed ignorance and bowel-rotting gluttony".

The second side opens with "Impression of J. Temperance", a "stark, mud-stained tale of cloning gone horribly wrong". "In the Park" deals with outdoor sex. "W.M.C. – Blob 59" combines lo-fi tape recordings of rehearsals and conversations. "Gramme Friday" was described as a "hymn to amphetamines". The album's closing track, "The N.W.R.A" ("The North Will Rise Again", not, as some supposed, "The North West Republican Army") was viewed by AllMusic as "Smith's own take on the long-standing "soft south/grim north" dichotomy in English society", while Robert Ham saw it as "a literary vision of political upheaval in Northern England". Rolling Stone merely saw it as Smith shouting out his hometown.

== Reception ==
Professional ratings
Review scores
Source	Rating
AllMusic	4/5 stars
Christgau's Record Guide	B
Classic Rock	8/10
The Encyclopedia of Popular Music	3/5 stars
Mojo	4/5 stars
Record Mirror	3/5 stars
The Rolling Stone Album Guide	4/5 stars
Sounds	5/5 stars
Spin Alternative Record Guide	9/10
Uncut	8/10

In contemporary reviews, Johnny Waller, reviewing Grotesque for Sounds, hailed the album as "rock n' roll with a conscience". Critic Robert Christgau described it simply as "poetry readings with two-chord backing". NME writer Graham Lock was more reserved in his praise, deeming it the Fall's "least flawed album" while suggesting that the band had yet to reach their full potential. Chris Westwood of Record Mirror viewed it as a disappointment, finding that the band's cynical outlook had become predictable.

Retrospective assessments were more positive. In his review of Grotesque for AllMusic, Ned Raggett opined that the band "really started hitting its stride" with the album, commenting on its "sharp rockabilly leads and random art rock racket". In The New Rolling Stone Album Guide, Joe Gross cites Grotesque as "the first truly great Fall album". In Stereogum, Robert Ham saw the band "hitting their creative stride as songwriters and players" on the album, stating, "Some of it is still very tattered around the edges, but the majority of it finds that unique static charge that made their '80s work so compelling." Trouser Press viewed the album as "[removing] the Fall even further from the world of easy listening", describing the tracks as "mostly one-or-two-chord jams played too slowly to be hardcore, but structured similarly".

Grotesque was included in Al Spicer's 1999 book Rock: 100 Essential CDs, in which he described it as "among the Fall's most powerful statements, and recorded by the most inventive of the band's constantly evolving line-ups". In a 2018 article for Billboard, Geeta Dayal listed Grotesque as the Fall's fifth-best album, noting its "slightly cleaner sound" and citing "The N.W.R.A." and "The Container Drivers" as highlights. In 2020, Rolling Stone included Grotesque (After the Gramme) in its "80 Greatest albums of 1980" list, praising the band for its "ability to craft impossibly catchy songs that simultaneously sound like they're shaking apart at the seams".

== Reissues ==
Grotesque was first reissued through Castle Music in 1993. In 1998, Cog Sinister, Mark E. Smith's own imprint, released a poorly mastered edition with significant vinyl noise. However, an improved edition followed almost immediately through Castle, adding four bonus tracks: "How I Wrote 'Elastic Man'", "City Hobgoblins", "Totally Wired" and "Putta Block", the last of these being slightly edited from the original "Totally Wired" single. The final and current edition, again on Castle, was properly remastered, including the four bonus tracks ("Putta Block" still being slightly cut) and a "self-interview" by Smith that had been used for promotional purposes upon the album's original release.

The original ten-track album was reissued on vinyl by the Turning Point label in 2002, with a two-LP edition being issued by Earmark in 2005. The latter edition replicated the definitive track listing of the 2004 CD. It was released again on vinyl in 2016 by Superior Viaduct, and again by Music On Vinyl in 2023, though with track 10 replaced by a live version taken from A Part of America Therein, 1981.

== Track listing ==
All lyrics are written by Mark E. Smith.

Side A
No.	Title	Writer(s)	Length
1.	"Pay Your Rates"	Smith	2:58
2.	"English Scheme"	Smith, Craig Scanlon, Marc Riley	2:06
3.	"New Face in Hell"	Smith, Scanlon, Riley	5:40
4.	"C'n'C-S Mithering"	Smith, Scanlon, Riley, Steve Hanley	7:36
5.	"The Container Drivers"	Smith, Scanlon, Riley, S. Hanley, Paul Hanley	3:08

Side B
No.	Title	Writer(s)	Length
6.	"Impression of J. Temperance"	Smith, Scanlon, Riley	4:20
7.	"In the Park"	Smith	1:43
8.	"W.M.C.-Blob 59"	Smith	1:19
9.	"Gramme Friday"	Smith, Scanlon, Riley	3:19
10.	"The N.W.R.A."	Smith, Scanlon, S. Hanley	9:08
Total length:			41:21

2004 reissue bonus tracks
No.	Title	Writer(s)	Length
11.	"How I Wrote 'Elastic Man'" (Non-album single, 1980)	Smith, Scanlon, Riley, S. Hanley	4:20
12.	"City Hobgoblins" (B-side)	Smith, Scanlon, Riley, S. Hanley	2:23
13.	"Totally Wired" (Non-album single, 1980)	Smith, Scanlon, Riley	3:25
14.	"Putta Block" (B-side)	Smith, Scanlon, Riley, S. Hanley, P. Hanley	4:30
15.	"Mark E. Smith Interview" (Self-interview recorded in 1980 for Tapezine)	Smith	7:18
Total length:			63:06

== Personnel ==
The Fall

- Mark E. Smith – vocals, tape operation, kazoo (track 3), guitar
- Marc Riley – guitar, keyboards
- Craig Scanlon – guitar (credited as 'Craig Scanlan')
- Steve Hanley – bass guitar
- Paul Hanley – drums

Additional musicians

- Kay Carroll – additional vocals

Technical

- The Fall – production (1–10)
- Geoff Travis – production (1–10)
- Grant Showbiz – production (1–5)
- Mayo Thompson – production (1–5)
- John Brierley – engineering
- George "Porky" Peckham – mastering
- Suzanne Smith – cover artwork

=== Weekly charts ===
Weekly chart performance for Grotesque
Chart (1982)	Peak position
New Zealand Albums (RMNZ)	38
