= Steve Hanley (musician) =

Irish-born English musician (born 1959)

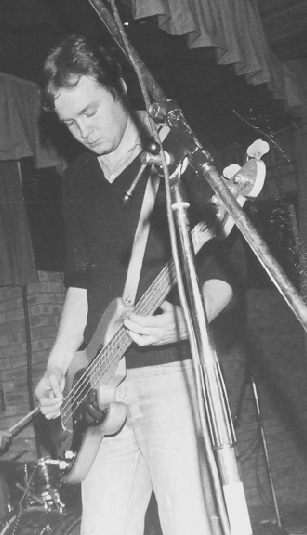
- Hanley in 1980

Background information
- Born: Stephen Hanley; 29 May 1959 (age 67); Dublin, Ireland
- Genre: Post-punk
- Occupations: Musician, songwriter
- Instrument: Bass guitar
- Years active: 1976–present
- Labels: Beggars Banquet, Phonogram, Rough Trade, Newmemorabilia

Stephen Hanley (born 29 May 1959) is an Irish-born English musician best known as the bass guitarist in the Fall from 1979 to 1998 and with House Of All since 2022. His distinctive and muscular basslines were a signature part of their sound, often carrying the songs' instrumental melodies. Hanley is second only to Mark E. Smith in longevity in the band. With Peter Hook, Andy Rourke and Gary Mounfield, he is widely considered one of the pre-eminent Manchester bassists of his generation. He has always been very private and rarely interviewed; for this reason his 2014 autobiography The Big Midweek: Life Inside The Fall was highly anticipated. On publication it was met with widespread acclaim for its frank honesty and dry, no nonsense humour.

He is currently a member of Brix & the Extricated with guitarist and vocalist Brix Smith. He also played bass with The House Of All, consisting of a number of other ex-Fall members, who released four albums from 2023 to 2026, to widespread acclaim.

== Career ==
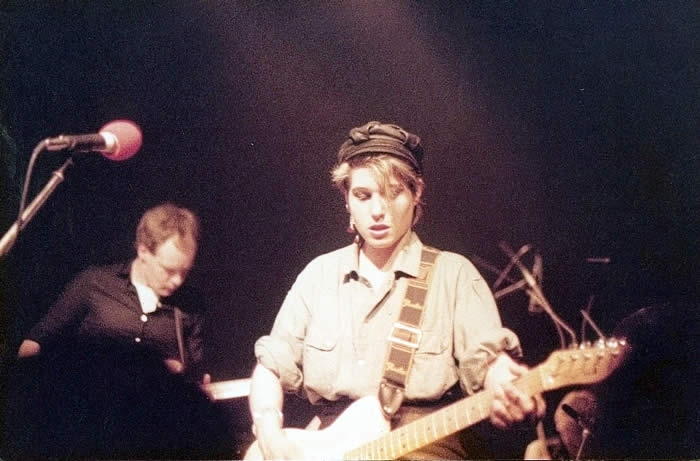
The Fall: Steve Hanley and Brix Smith, Perverted By Language tour, Hamburg, 13 April 1984

In 1978 he played in the Sirens alongside Marc Riley and Craig Scanlon. When Riley left to join the Fall, they became Staff 9, but disbanded when Hanley and Scanlon joined the Fall themselves in 1979. During the first half of the 1980s, Hanley's brother Paul was also a member of the Fall, playing drums and keyboards. Scanlon and Hanley were stalwarts in The Fall through multiple lineup changes in the 1980s and into the '90s. In a 1992 interview with Volume magazine (issue 4), frontman Mark E. Smith described Scanlon and Hanley as "fuckin' hard as nails...very super-intelligent fellows, but they're really reticent...I just love them to death. Jesuit lads, (Note: Though Hanley was raised Catholic, Smith used "Jesuit" metaphorically, meaning someone intelligent, hardworking, devoted, and self-effacing.) you know...Steve and Craig are brilliant". In a late '80s interview, Smith said that "the most original aspect of The Fall is Steve...I've never heard a bass player like him. He is The Fall sound." Hanley co-wrote the music for over 100 Fall songs on more than a dozen albums; including the tracks "Rowche Rumble", "Fiery Jack", "Container Drivers", "Lie Dream of a Casino Soul", "Totally Wired", "Winter", "The N.W.R.A.", "To Nkroachment: Yarbles", "I Am Damo Suzuki", "Jerusalem", "Van Plague?", "Yes, O Yes", and "Free Range". He has said that his part on the This Nation's Saving Grace track "Bombast" is the bass-line he is most proud of.

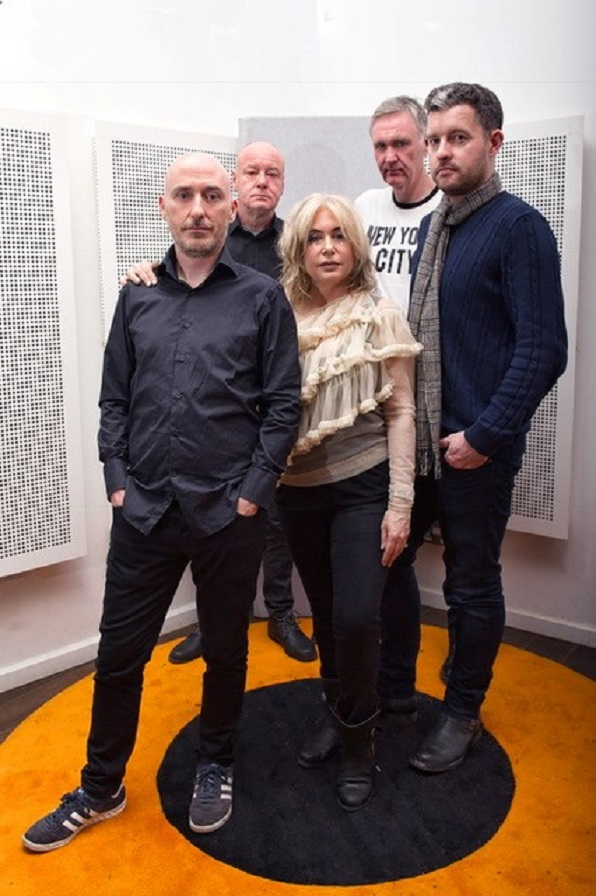
Hanley (back left) with Brix & the Extricated in 2016

Hanley left the Fall in April 1998 following an onstage altercation in New York, which also resulted in the departures of longtime drummer Karl Burns and guitarist Tommy Crooks. Smith regretted the row and asked Hanley to return, but the bassist declined. After, he formed Ark with Burns, Crooks and former Creepers bassist Pete Keogh, the band releasing the album Brainsold in 2002, and joined the Lovers in 2001, a group fronted by Tom Hingley of Inspiral Carpets. Both these bands also featured Paul Hanley. The Lovers released two albums, Abba Are the Enemy, released in 2004, and Highlights which was released in March 2008. The band split amicably in 2012. He was briefly a member of fellow ex-Fall member Martin Bramah's group Factory Star, as was his brother Paul Hanley. "The Big Midweek" a book chronicling Hanley's time in the Fall, written by him with Olivia Piekarski, released by Route Publishing on 15 September 2014. He was also a member of Brix & The Extricated alongside brother Paul, Steve Trafford and Jason Brown.

His 2014 autobiography The Big Midweek: Life Inside the Fall was met with critical acclaim. As of 2023, Hanley plays bass with The House Of All, a band consisting of his brother Paul, and other ex-Fall members Martin Bramah, Simon Wolstencroft, and Pete Greenway. Their critically and fan acclaimed self-titled debut album is due for release in April 2023.

== Discography ==
Album	Date of release	Label
Dragnet	26 October 1979	Step Forward Records
Grotesque (After the Gramme)	17 November 1980	Rough Trade Records
Slates	27 April 1981	Rough Trade Records
Hex Enduction Hour	8 March 1982	Kamera Records
Room to Live	27 September 1982	Kamera Records
Perverted By Language	12 December 1983	Rough Trade Records
The Wonderful and Frightening World of The Fall	8 October 1984	Beggars Banquet Records
This Nation's Saving Grace	23 September 1985	Beggars Banquet Records
Bend Sinister	29 September 1986	Beggars Banquet Records
The Frenz Experiment	29 February 1988	Beggars Banquet Records
I Am Kurious, Oranj	31 October 1988	Beggars Banquet Records
Extricate	19 February 1990	Phonogram
Shift-Work	22 April 1991	Phonogram
Code: Selfish	23 March 1992	Phonogram
The Infotainment Scan	26 April 1993	Permanent Records; Matador Records
Middle Class Revolt	3 May 1994	Permanent Records
Cerebral Caustic	27 February 1995	Permanent Records
The Light User Syndrome	10 June 1996	Jet Records
Levitate	29 September 1997	Artful Records

== Sources ==
- Edge, Brian. Paintwork: Portrait of The Fall. London: Omnibus Press, 1989. ISBN 978-0-7119-1740-8
- Ford, Simon. Hip Priest: The Story of Mark E.Smith and the Fall. London: Quartet Books, 2002. ISBN 978-0-7043-8167-4
- Hanley, Steve. "The Big Midweek: Life Inside The Fall". London: Route, 2014. ISBN 978-1-9019-2758-0
- Smith, Brix. The Rise, The Fall, and The Rise. London: Faber & Faber, 2017. ISBN 978-0-5713-2506-1
