= Totally Wired =

Single by the Fall
- A-side: "Totally Wired"
- B-side: "Putta Block"
- Released: September 1980
- Genre: Post-punk
- Length: 3:25
- Label: Rough Trade
- Songwriters: Mark E. Smith, Marc Riley, Craig Scanlon, Steve Hanley

The Fall singles chronology
"Rowche Rumble" (1979)	"Totally Wired" (1980)	"Fiery Jack" (1980)

"Totally Wired" is a song by the Fall. Released in September 1980, the single became one of their signature tracks. The track subsequently appeared on CD reissues of their album Grotesque (After the Gramme). The track reached no. 2 in the UK Independent Singles Chart and no. 25 in New Zealand.

== Release ==
The track appeared in John Peel's Festive Fifty in both 1980 and 1981, reaching 21 and 56 respectively and number 34 on All Time Festive Fifty broadcast in 2000. Subsequently it appeared at #57 on the "100 Greatest Singles of the Post-Punk Era" published by Uncut in 2001, in Gary Mulholland's book This is Uncool – The 500 Greatest Singles since Punk and Disco, published in 2003, and in the Guide To the (500) Greatest Songs from Punk To the Present published by Pitchfork published in 2014.

In a dismissive review on its release, Danny Baker said in NME: "Totally Wired is ugly, and terribly produced – yes it does matter!" and "I can't see there's an audience for the Fall's constant verbal battering."

== Influence ==
The song has been sampled by the Justified Ancients of Mu Mu on their album 1987 (What the Fuck Is Going On?) and covered by Terry Edwards, Chris Cacavas, and the Last Shadow Puppets on their 2016 EP The Dream Synopsis. The Last Shadow Puppets' performance of the song at Manchester's Castlefield Bowl on 10 July 2016 saw them joined by Johnny Marr, who had earlier admitted to being 'obsessed' with the song.

== Track listings ==
All songs written and composed by the Fall (Mark E. Smith, Craig Scanlon, Marc Riley and Paul Hanley).

"Totally Wired" (7")

Side A
No.	Title	Length
1.	"Totally Wired"	3:25

Side B
No.	Title	Length
1.	"Putta Block"	4:35

== Sources ==
- Hanley, Paul. Have a Bleedin Guess: The Story of Hex Enduction Hour. Pontefract: Route Publishing, 2020. ISBN 978-1-901927-80-1
- Pringle, Steve. You Must Get Them All: The Fall On Record. London: Route Publishing, 2022. ISBN 978-1-9019-2788-7
