= Julia Adamson =

Canadian musician

- Also known as: Julia Nagle (1988–2006)
- Born: Julia Adamson; September 30, 1960 (age 65); Peterborough, Ontario, Canada
- Origin: Manchester, England
- Genres: Punk, electronic, rock
- Occupations: Composer, musician, label manager
- Instruments: Guitar, synthesizer, keyboards, vocals, computer programming
- Years active: 1971–present
- Label: Invisiblegirl Records

Julia Adamson (also known as Julia Nagle from 1988 to 2006) (born September 30, 1960 in Peterborough, Ontario) is a Canadian composer, musician and current label manager of Invisiblegirl Records. She came to prominence as a recording engineer, and was a member of the Fall between 1995 and 2001.

== Biography ==
In 1967 her family moved to Manchester, England. In 1971, she sang in St Winifred's School Choir on the school's first album of modern hymns.

In 1977, Adamson played guitar in the punk group Blackout, alongside James Fry, Tony Ogden, and Gordon King. Fry, Ogden, and King went on to form World of Twist and Earl Brutus. A 2022 book by King, When Does the Mind-Bending Start?: The Life and Times of World of Twist, includes memories of Blackout.

She played synthesiser with early electronica band Illustration in 1979 whose members were Tony Harrison (Lead Vocals) Timm Johnson (Guitar/Synthesiser) Paul Lancaster (Bass) and George Terry (Drums). Their track "Tidal Flow" was included on the classic record Some Bizzare Album on Some Bizzare Records run by Stevo Pearce. The group toured with Blancmange and Pink Military. In 2020 they were included on compilation "The Tears of Technology" on Ace Records with track "Tidal Flow" and in 2022 on compilation album "Prophecy & Progress" on Peripheral Minimal Records with track "Dimensions of Design". A book by Wesley Doyle titled "Conform to Deform" published in 2023, where Illustration are interviewed about "The Some Bizzare Album". The book is set to become a 4 part BBC documentary. In November 2025 Illustration Records released Synchronise Your Heart album of demos and radio sessions from the time, available from Bandcamp.

Adamson worked as personal assistant to record producer Martin Hannett from 1981 until 1983. A book by Audrey Golden titled "Factory Women" was published in May 2023, in which she is interviewed about Factory Records.

She was employed as a tape op and sound engineer at Yellow Two and Strawberry Studios in Stockport from 1984 to 1990. While working at Yellow Two and Strawberry Studios recording studios, she played guitar, synthesiser and programmed computers in group What?Noise from 1986 until 1991. She contributed to album Fat and 12" vinyl EP Vein. What?Noise toured in the UK and recorded at the studios where they worked as sound technicians. At the closure of Strawberry studios in 1991 Adamson helped to rescue a number of copy-master tapes from destruction (they were thrown in a skip outside the building). There were a number of tapes that included recordings by Factory Records and other artists.

She was a member of the Fall between 1995 and 2001, playing keyboards, guitar, vocals and computers. She contributed to albums The Twenty Seven Points, The Light User Syndrome, Levitate, The Post Nearly Man, The Marshall Suite and The Unutterable. She and Mark E Smith contributed to songs by Elastica and performed at the 'Sacred and Profane' themed Meltdown Festival hosted by Nick Cave in 1999. Adamson toured extensively with the Fall.

In 2006, Adamson launched Invisiblegirl Records and Invisible Girl Music Publishing, with over 30 releases to date. Invisible Girl Music includes an expanding publishing catalogue of original songs from the singer-songwriters on her record label.

== See also ==
- List of the Fall band members
