= The Fall (band) =

English rock band (1976–2018)

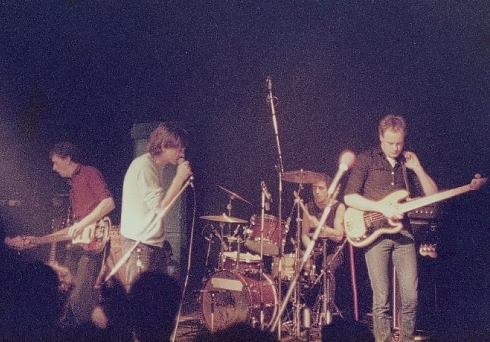
- The Fall performing in 1984; L–R: Craig Scanlon, Mark E. Smith, Karl Burns, and Steve Hanley

Background information
- Also known as: The Mighty Fall
- Origin: Prestwich, Greater Manchester, England
- Genre: Post-punk
- Years active: 1976–2018
- Labels: Step forward/Faulty Products; Rough Trade; Kamera; Beggars Banquet; Situation Two; Narnack; Phonogram/Fontana; Matador; Permanent; Slogan; Domino; Action; Cherry Red; Cog Sinister
- Spinoffs: The Adult Net; Blue Orchids; Brix & the Extricated; The Creepers; Imperial Wax; Von Südenfed; House of All
- Past members: Mark E. Smith; Paul Hanley; Simon Wolstencroft; Karl Burns; Craig Scanlon; Marc Riley; Brix Smith; Steve Hanley; Eleni Poulou; See members section for others

The Fall were an English post-punk band, formed in 1976 in Prestwich, Greater Manchester. They had many line-up changes, with vocalist and founder member Mark E. Smith being the only constant member. Their music was generally characterised by Smith's caustic lyrics and sprechgesang vocal delivery, an abrasive, repetitive guitar-driven sound, and tense bass and drum rhythms. Although never achieving widespread mainstream success beyond minor hit singles in the late 1980s and early 1990s, they maintained a strong cult following throughout the years. The Fall have been called "the most prolific band of the British post-punk movement".

Originally emerging out of the late 1970s punk movement, the Fall's music underwent numerous stylistic changes often concurrently with changes in the group's lineup. Long-term musicians included drummers Paul Hanley, Simon Wolstencroft and Karl Burns; guitarists Craig Scanlon, Marc Riley, and Brix Smith; and bassist Steve Hanley, whose melodic, circular bass lines are widely credited with shaping the band's sound from 1979 to 1998. The band were championed by British DJ John Peel, who regarded them as his personal favourite and invited them numerous times on the BBC's Peel Sessions, stating: "They are always different; they are always the same." From 1979 to 2017, they released 31 studio albums, plus dozens of live albums and compilations released against Smith's wishes. The group disbanded after Smith's death in 2018.

== History ==
=== Late 1970s: early years ===
The Fall were formed in Prestwich, England in 1976 by Mark E. Smith, Martin Bramah, Una Baines, and Tony Friel. The four friends met to read their writings to each other and take drugs. Their musical influences included Can (which the band would later pay tribute to on the track "I Am Damo Suzuki"), the Velvet Underground, Captain Beefheart and garage rock bands like the Monks and the Stooges. The members were devoted readers, with Smith citing H. P. Lovecraft, Raymond Chandler and Malcolm Lowry among his favourite writers. After seeing the Sex Pistols play their second gig at Manchester's Lesser Free Trade Hall in July 1976, they decided to start a group. Smith wanted to name the group "the Outsiders", but Friel came up with the name "the Fall" after a 1956 novel by Albert Camus. Smith became the singer, Bramah the guitarist, Friel played bass guitar and Baines bashed biscuit tins instead of drums; unable to afford to buy a drum kit, she then switched to keyboards. Their music was intentionally raw and repetitive. The song "Repetition", declaring that "We dig repetition in the music And we're never going to lose it", served as a manifesto for the Fall's musical philosophy.

The group played their first concert on 23 May 1977, at the North West Arts basement. Their first drummer was remembered only as "Dave" or "Steve" for 34 years, until music writer Dave Simpson discovered that he had almost certainly been a man named Steve Ormrod. Ormrod lasted just one show, at least in part due to political differences with the other members of the group. He was replaced by Karl Burns, whom Friel played with in a band called Nuclear Angel. The Fall soon caught the attention of Buzzcocks manager Richard Boon, who funded their first recording session, and in November 1977 they recorded material for their debut EP, Bingo-Master's Break-Out! Boon planned to release the EP on his New Hormones label, but after discovering that he could not afford to do so he gave the tapes back to the group. Thus, the Fall's debut on vinyl came in June 1978 when "Stepping Out" and "Last Orders" were released by Virgin Records on Short Circuit: Live at the Electric Circus, a compilation of live recordings made at the Manchester venue The Electric Circus in October 1977 just before it was closed.

The Fall's line-up had its first drastic changes in 1977–78. Kay Carroll, Una Baines's friend and colleague at the psychiatric hospital, became the group's manager and occasional backing vocalist, as well as Smith's girlfriend. Friel, unhappy with Carroll's management, left in December 1977 (he went on to form the Passage with Dick Witts). He was briefly replaced by Jonnie Brown, and later by Eric McGann (also known as Eric the Ferrett). The Fall were filmed on 13 February 1978 for the Granada TV show What's On, hosted by Tony Wilson, performing "Psycho Mafia", "Industrial Estate" and "Dresden Dolls", featuring the brief line-up of Smith, Bramah, Burns, Baines and McGann. Baines left in March 1978 after a drug overdose and subsequent nervous breakdown, and was replaced by Yvonne Pawlett; McGann quit that May, in disgust at the group's van driver Steve Davies wearing a Hawaiian shirt as he ferried them to the recording of their first-ever session for influential radio DJ John Peel. (The Fall would record a total of 24 sessions for Peel, who became a devoted fan of the group.) Martin Bramah blamed the dissolution of the original line-up on Smith's style of leadership, together with Carroll's favouring of her partner: "The break-up wasn't so much about the music, though; it was more how we were being treated as people on a daily basis." Marc Riley, the group's roadie was 16; eventually he was recruited to be in the group and play bass guitar.

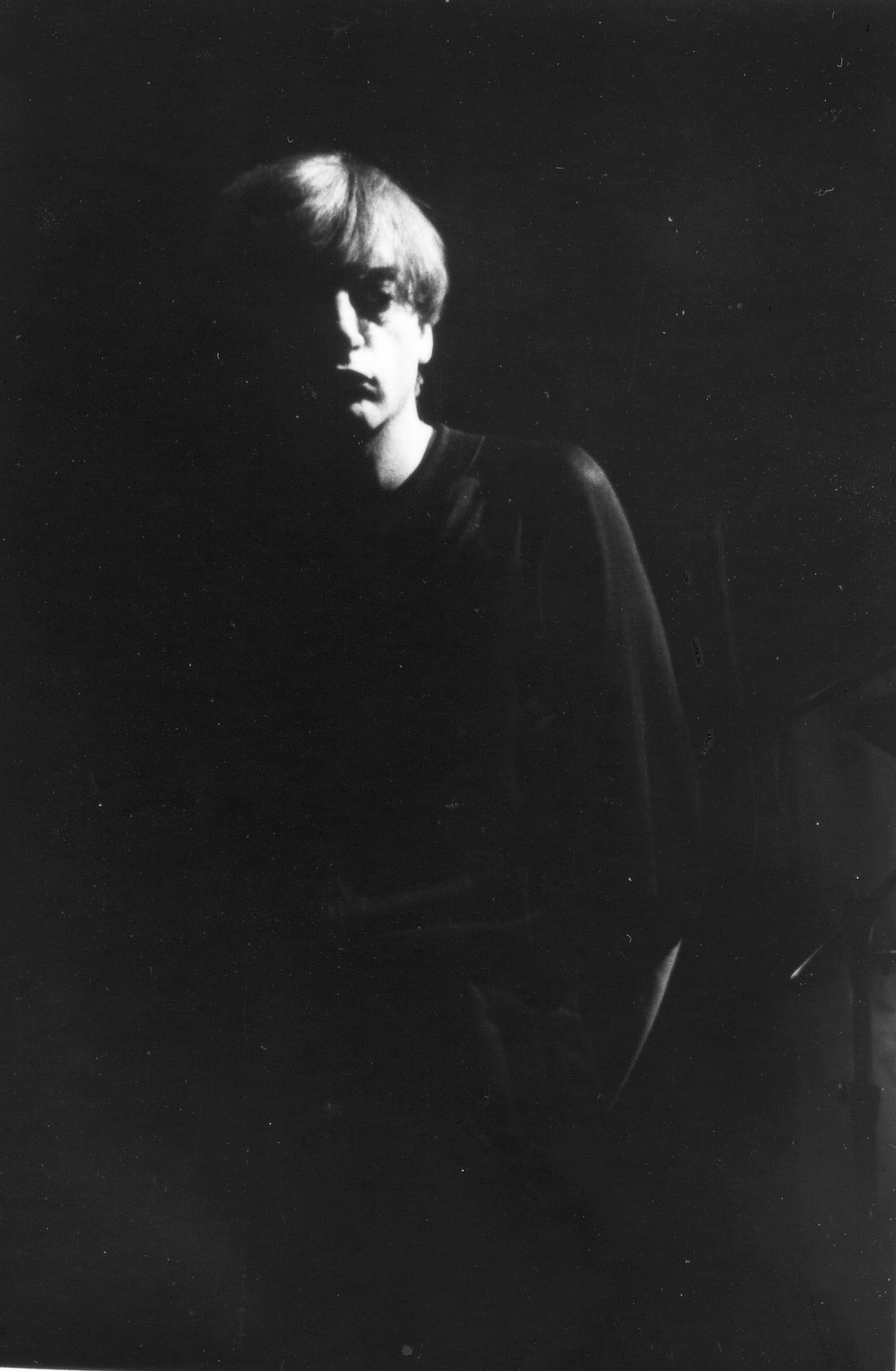
Smith in Tokyo, 1990

Bingo-Master's Break-Out! finally was released in August 1978 on Step Forward Records. The single "It's the New Thing" followed in November 1978, and in December the Fall recorded (in a single day) their debut album Live at the Witch Trials, which was released in March 1979. Burns quit the group shortly after the album was recorded, and was replaced by Mike Leigh from Rockin' Ricky, a cabaret band. In April 1979, Burns was followed by Martin Bramah, co-writer of most of the songs on Live at the Witch Trials and, according to writer Daryl Eslea, "possibly the last true equal to Smith in the group"; he went on to form Blue Orchids with Una Baines. Marc Riley switched from bass guitar to guitar, and Craig Scanlon (guitar) and Steve Hanley (bass guitar), former bandmates of Riley and members of Fall support act Staff 9, joined the group. Hanley's melodic basslines became a vital part of the Fall's music for almost two decades. Smith praised his playing in Melody Maker: "The most original aspect of the Fall is Steve ... I've never heard a bass player like him ... I don't have to tell him what to play, he just knows. He is the Fall sound." Yvonne Pawlett left in July 1979 to look after her dog. She later appeared in a band called Shy Tots.

On 30 July 1979, "Rowche Rumble", the Fall's third single, was released featuring the line up of Smith, Scanlon, Riley, Hanley, Pawlett and Leigh. Pawlett left the group shortly afterwards. Dragnet, the Fall's second album, was recorded in August 1979 at Cargo Studios, Rochdale, and was released on 26 October 1979. Dragnet signalled a sparser, more jagged feel in the Fall's music compared to Live at the Witch Trials. The studio allegedly complained about the sound quality and protested against putting its name on the album sleeve, fearing it would put other artists off using the facilities.

=== 1980–1982: Classic line-up ===
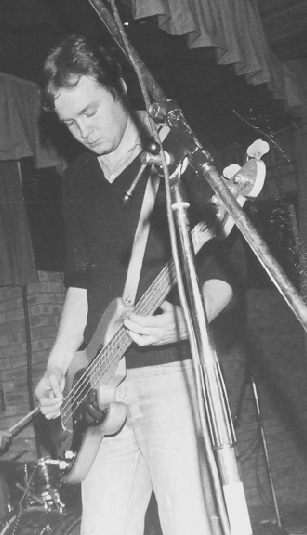
Hanley, live with the Fall, 1980

The Fall released their fourth single "Fiery Jack", their last for Step Forward, on 13 January 1980. In March, Mike Leigh left the group and went back to the cabaret circuit. According to Leigh, the band would have to wait for weeks without work while Smith came up with new lyrics, as opposed to regular weekly gigs in cabaret. Leigh's replacement was Paul Hanley, Steve Hanley's younger brother. He first played live with the Fall on Friday 21 March at Electric Ballroom, London–he was only 16 and was actually still at school. Meanwhile, the Fall quit Step Forward and signed with Rough Trade; the first release on a new label became Totale's Turns in May 1980. This, with the exception of two tracks, was a live album documenting the band during various appearances in 1979, with Smith announcing last orders at the bar [responding to a request for the song "Last Orders"] and berating band members and audience throughout.

In November 1980, the Fall released their third full-length album Grotesque (After the Gramme). Preceded by a couple of acclaimed singles "How I Wrote 'Elastic Man'" and "Totally Wired", the album went to no. 1 on the UK Indie Chart. It was co-produced by Rough Trade's Geoff Travis and Mayo Thompson of Red Krayola and showed a significant improvement in production, which was to continue throughout the period. Smith, however, was unhappy with Rough Trade's politics, which showed when Slates came out in April 1981. Intentionally made too long for a single and too short to be considered an album, it was released as a 10" EP for a price of just 2 pounds. The Fall eventually quit Rough Trade by the end of the year, and instead signed with a small indie label Kamera.

As the Fall were going to tour America after the release of Slates, Paul Hanley was denied a visa as he was too young to play American clubs that serve alcohol, which restrict entry to those age 21 or older. Smith thus invited Karl Burns back into the group, initially as a temporary replacement. Select recordings from this tour were released in 1982 as A Part of America Therein, 1981. After their return to the UK, Burns stayed in the group as a second drummer alongside Hanley. The first record to feature both Burns and Hanley became the "Lie Dream of a Casino Soul" single, produced by Richard Mazda and released in Australia and New Zealand in November 1981.

On 8 March 1982 Hex Enduction Hour, also produced by Mazda, was released on Kamera Records, the Fall's seventh single ("Look, Know") was released 19 April 1982 on Kamera. On 27 September the Room to Live album was released on Kamera. Marc Riley was sacked at the end of the year, following several arguments, one of which resulted in a fist fight during the Australian tour. In response, Riley's band "The Creepers" wrote the track "Jumper Clown", which directly references Riley's dismissal, while also satirising Smith's dress sense.

This era is often regarded as a high point in the band's creative history, as noted by Ned Raggett of AllMusic who retrospectively described the late years with Riley and shortly after his departure as "three years during which the band couldn't seem to make a wrong step."

=== 1983–1989: Brix Smith years ===
In 1983, Rough Trade Records released the Fall's ninth single, "The Man Whose Head Expanded", and on 19 September issued the band's tenth single and double pack "Kicker Conspiracy". Bizarrely, in November Kamera Records released around two- to three-thousand copies of the planned 1982 single "Marquis Cha Cha", the release date having been put back due to Kamera's financial troubles in late 1982, making it the Fall's eleventh single issue.

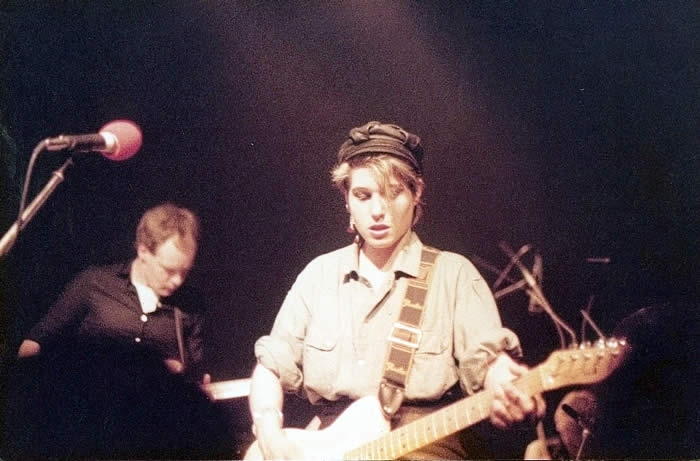
Steve Hanley and Brix Smith during the Perverted By Language tour in Hamburg, Germany, April 1984

That year Smith's American girlfriend and later wife, Brix Smith joined the band on guitar. Born Laura Elise Salenger, she was nicknamed after the track "The Guns of Brixton" by the Clash, a favourite song of hers. Brix's tenure in the group marked a shift towards the relatively conventional, with the songs she co-wrote often having strong pop hooks and more orthodox verse-chorus-verse structures. Additionally, Brix's keen sense of fashion gradually influenced the group's members to give more attention to their clothing and styling, though her platinum blonde hair and glamorous style were somewhat at odds to the otherwise working class appearance of the Fall. Brix's first live appearance with the Fall was on 21 September 1983 at the Hellfire Club, Wakefield.

Perverted by Language, released 5 December, was the Fall's final album for Rough Trade Records, but the first to feature Brix. Also released in December was the live album In a Hole, recorded during the Fall's tour of New Zealand in 1982, on Flying Nun Records.

This era, a favourite period amongst many critics and fans, was marked by Brix's effort to find a wider audience for the Fall. They achieved a few modest UK hits with singles, including their versions of R. Dean Taylor's "There's a Ghost in My House" (no. 30, 1987) and the Kinks' "Victoria" (no. 35, 1988) and their own songs "Hey! Luciani" (no. 59, 1986) and "Hit the North" (no. 57, 1987), and enjoyed a string of critically acclaimed albums: The Wonderful and Frightening World of the Fall (1984), This Nation's Saving Grace (1985), Bend Sinister (1986), and The Frenz Experiment (1988). I Am Kurious, Oranj is notable as the fruit of a ballet project between Smith and dancer Michael Clark. Simon Rogers and later Marcia Schofield played keyboards. Paul Hanley quit during the tour supporting The Wonderful and Frightening World of the Fall, and the drummer Simon Wolstencroft replaced Burns after This Nation's Saving Grace. Wolstencroft's becoming the sole drummer shifted the group's sound. In 2014 Wolstencroft published a memoir You Can Drum But You Can't Hide about his 11-year stint in the Fall.

=== 1990–2000 ===
With Brix's departure in 1989 – both from the band and her marriage to Smith – Bramah returned briefly for 1990's Extricate, the first of the Fall's three albums for Phonogram Records. In the early 1990s the band continued to have modest success on the UK chart with singles including "Telephone Thing" (no. 58, 1990), "White Lightning" (no. 56, 1990), "Free Range" (no. 40, 1992) and "Why Are People Grudgeful" (no. 43, 1993). Bramah and Schofield were sacked in advance of 1991's Shift-Work. Dave Bush joined on keyboards for 1992's Code: Selfish, followed by the band's return to an independent record label for The Infotainment Scan (1993), Middle Class Revolt (1994), and Cerebral Caustic (1995). These albums featured varying degrees of electronica and IDM, courtesy of Bush's keyboards and computers. Caustic saw the unexpected return of Smith's ex-wife Brix, who recorded The Light User Syndrome before departing in 1996. When Dave Bush went to join Elastica, Scanlon was sacked after sixteen years, an unpopular decision which Smith would later regret. In November 1994 Julia Nagle joined to help promote the release of Cerebral Caustic, playing keyboards, guitars and computers. Nagle went onto contribute to The Light User Syndrome in 1996. That year also saw the start of a torrent of compilations of live, demo and alternative versions of songs on the Fall's new label Receiver Records.

In 1994 and 1996, the Fall played at the Phoenix Festival in Stratford-upon-Avon, England–the 1996 appearance being one of much surprise to many fans as they were not scheduled to play. The next album, Levitate (1997), toyed with drum and bass and polarised opinion (long-serving drummer Simon Wolstencroft left halfway through the recording sessions, and was replaced–again–by Karl Burns). Steven Wells in the NME (11 October 1997) wrote, "Imagine pop without perimeters. Imagine rock without rules. Imagine art without the wank. If you've never heard the Fall then Levitate will be either the best or the worst record you've ever heard." The group was temporarily reduced to Smith and Nagle when a short US tour ended in April 1998 with onstage rows at Brownies in New York, which resulted in Smith unplugging the amps during songs and lashing out at the other members, leading Burns to physically shove him. This led to the departure of Hanley (bassist of nineteen years), Burns, and guitarist Tommy Crooks. The following day, Smith was arrested and charged with assaulting Nagle in their hotel; he would later claim this was 'a heated argument... about sharing a room.' Despite this, Nagle remained with the band. The Smith and Nagle line-up would release two albums: The Marshall Suite (1999) and The Unutterable (2000).

=== 2001–2017: later years ===
Further rifts within the band followed in 2001, which led to a new line-up of Smith, Ben Pritchard (guitar), Ed Blaney (guitar), Jim Watts (bass), and Spencer Birtwistle (drums) releasing Are You Are Missing Winner that year to mixed reviews. Spencer Birtwistle was replaced by Dave Milner on drums in November 2001. September 2002 saw Elena Poulou–Smith's third wife–fill the vacant position of keyboards player, and that year Q magazine named the Fall one of "50 Bands to See Before You Die". The Real New Fall LP (renamed from Country on the Click after an earlier mix of the album appeared on Internet file sharing networks) followed in 2003, with a slightly different mix and some extra tracks for the US version, after which Jim Watts was sacked (replaced by Steve Trafford) and Milner was replaced by a returning Spencer Birtwistle. In 2004 the band released its first career-spanning compilation to positive reviews in June, and a new album, Interim, in November.

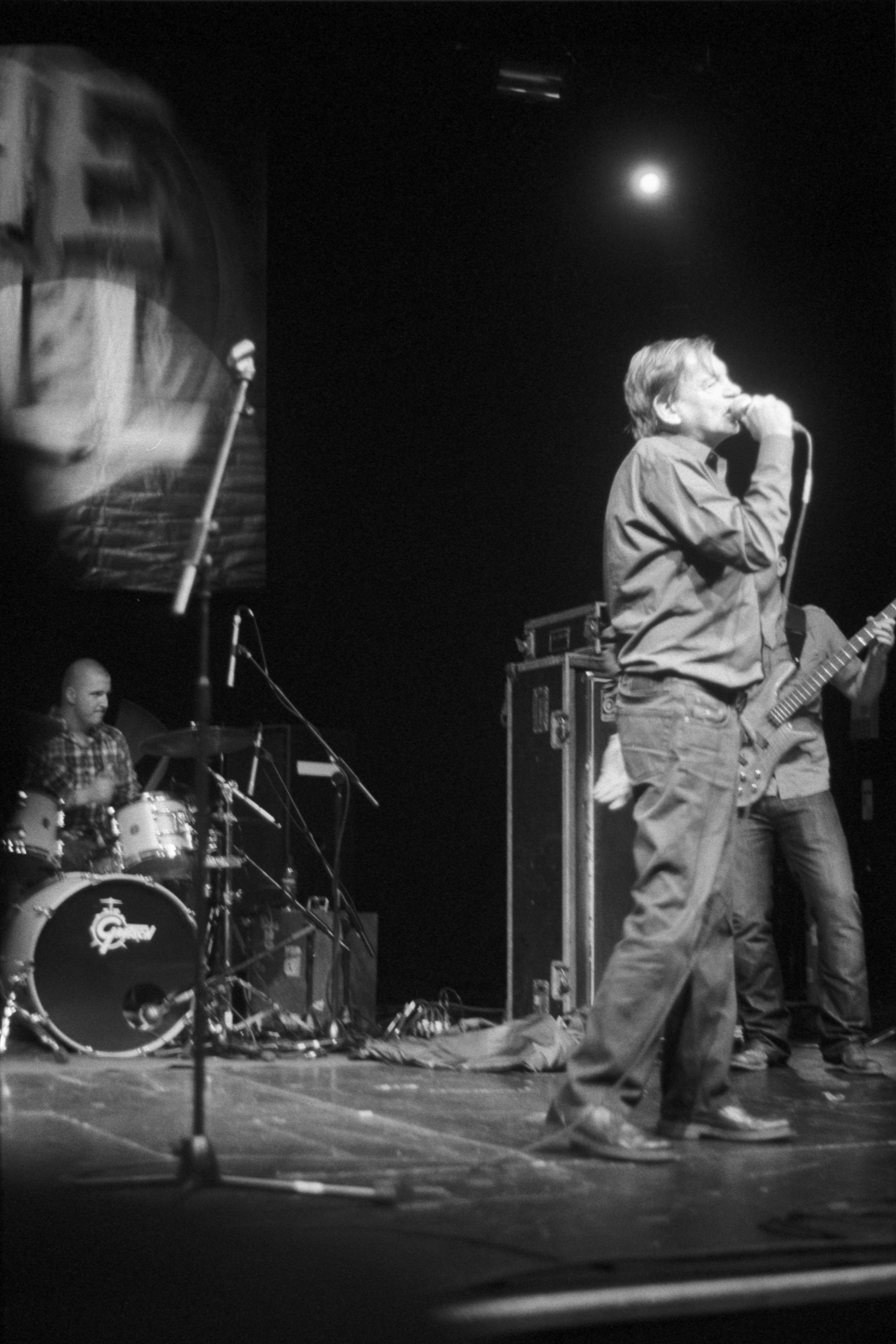
Edinburgh, 2011

In January 2005, the Fall were the subject of a BBC Four TV documentary, The Fall: The Wonderful and Frightening World of Mark E Smith. Their twenty-fifth studio album, entitled Fall Heads Roll, was issued on 3 October 2005. The guitarist, bassist, and drummer all left the group acrimoniously during the US summer 2006 tour after just four dates. In a US radio interview, Smith described their departures as "the best thing that ever happened" to the Fall, although it was some months before he confirmed that they would not be returning.

Early in 2007 the Fall released the Reformation Post TLC album, recorded with the same lineup that salvaged the 2006 US tour. Yet another lineup was released in 2008 Imperial Wax Solvent. This lineup would hold for the following three albums, with the core of Peter Greenway (guitar), David Spurr (bass), and Keiron Melling (drums) for the remainder of the band's existence. In April 2009, the Fall signed with UK-based independent record label Domino Records. A new studio album, titled Your Future Our Clutter, was released on 26 April 2010 and followed in November 2011 by the album Ersatz GB. In March 2012, the band were chosen by Jeff Mangum of Neutral Milk Hotel to perform at the All Tomorrow's Parties festival he curated in Minehead, England. The Fall released their twenty-ninth studio album, Re-Mit, in 2013.

In 2014, former members Brix Smith Start, Steve Hanley and Paul Hanley formed a new group called Brix & the Extricated. In addition to new original material, the group also performs songs that the members had written or co-written during their tenure with the Fall. Smith Start and Steve Hanley also both released autobiographies covering their tenures with the Fall around this time frame; 2016's The Rise, the Fall & the Rise and 2014's The Big Midweek: Life Inside the Fall, respectively.

The Fall's thirtieth album, Sub-Lingual Tablet, was released in 2015. This would be Elena Poulou's last album with the band: in a 2016 interview with Mojo Magazine, Smith announced that she had resigned; they would divorce that year. The Fall's 31st and final studio album, New Facts Emerge, was recorded as a four-piece and released in July 2017. Michael Clapham joined in May 2017 on keyboards, but never recorded with the band. Following Smith's death, Greenway, Spurr and Melling recruited singer and guitarist Sam Curran to form a new band, Imperial Wax.

=== Death of Mark E. Smith ===
Early in 2017, there were reports that Smith was ill, and over the year numerous live dates were cancelled or postponed for reasons of health, including a week's dates in New York. Having become weak due to a change in medicine, he performed some shows in a wheelchair. His final performance and last appearance in public took place at the Queen Margaret Union, Glasgow, on 4 November 2017. Another show was scheduled for the Fiddlers, Bristol, on 29 November; Smith travelled to Bristol but was then too unwell to leave his hotel room. The other members of the group made a brief appearance on stage and apologised to the people who had come to see the Fall.

On 24 January 2018, Smith died at his home in Prestwich, Greater Manchester after a long illness. He was 60 years old. Smith had been diagnosed with terminal lung and kidney cancer, which his family confirmed had contributed to his death. The announcement of Smith's death was made by his partner and Fall manager Pamela Vander. Smith had been an alcoholic and periodic drug user for much of his adult life, and had undergone treatment several times. His condition led to him falling and suffering bone fragmentation several times from the mid 2000s, leading to his performing several dates in a wheelchair and cast. A heavy smoker, Smith had long suffered from throat and respiratory problems; yet his work ethic or output never declined and he continued to release a new album close to once a year.

=== Posthumous projects ===
In August 2018, Cherry Red Records, the Fall's final label, announced they had purchased the rights to 40 Fall albums from Smith before his death and plan to release a reissue series and box set sometime in the future.

In June 2026, the band's former manager Ed Blaney announced a posthumous "official final" album would be released as Post Script in September. In August 2026, former member Simon "Ding" Archer clarified that the album would consist of unused vocal recordings of Smith with new musical backing created by Archer and Blaney, and that he considered it to be an album of "unheard recordings" rather than an official studio album.

== Smith's vocal style and lyrics ==
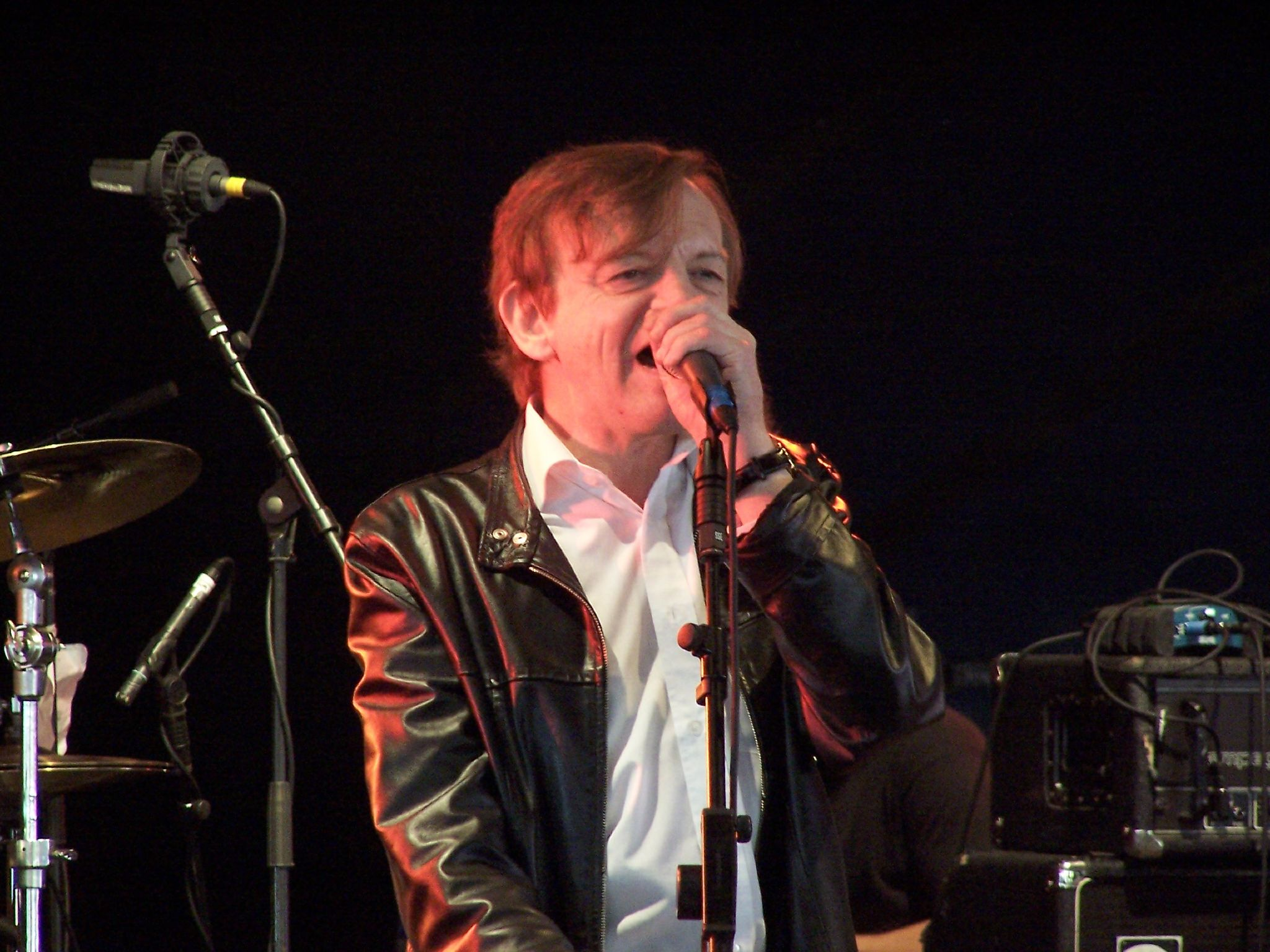
Mark E. Smith performing live in August 2006

Smith's vocal delivery was known for his tendency to end each phrase terminating in a consonant with an added schwa vocalisation ("ah"). He often spoke-sang or sing-slurred his lyrics, especially from the mid-1990s. His delivery, particularly when playing live, could be described as "rambling", and he often interjected improvised rants.

His lyrics, delivered in a heavy Mancunian accent, are often cryptic, absurdist and inscrutable, and were described by critic Simon Reynolds as "a kind of Northern English magic realism that mixed industrial grime with the unearthly and uncanny, voiced through a unique, one-note delivery somewhere between amphetamine-spiked rant and alcohol-addled yarn." Smith described his approach as wanting to combine "primitive music with intelligent lyrics". Thematically, his frequently densely layered lyrics often centre around descriptions of urban grotesques, gloomy landscapes, "crackpot history", and are infused with regional slang. A newspaper obituary encapsulated his artistic character: "Part-Anthony Burgess, part-punk-Andy Capp, Mark E Smith was a fierce art intelligence and a hero of polar opposition."

Fragments of Smith's lyrics often appeared handwritten on early Fall album and single covers, along with collages he had put together. In a 1983 interview with Sounds, Smith said that he liked artwork to reflect the album content and that his graphic choices reflected his attitude to music. He mentioned how he was drawn to cheap and misspelled posters, amateur layouts of local papers and printed cash and carry signs with "inverted commas where you don't need them". Mark E. Smith was an astute cultural critic, possibly one of the most intelligent lyricists to have emerged since the early days of punk: almost all his songs lambasted the hyping found in music, the absurd habits that working people took on to appear respectful or to feel less invisible, the buffoons who ran the country, and fame itself, including his own, in which he often felt trapped.

== Influence ==
On the group's influence, Stephen Thomas Erlewine of AllMusic wrote that "the Fall, like many cult bands, inspired a new generation of underground bands, ranging from waves of sound-alike indie rockers in the UK to acts in America and New Zealand, which is only one indication of the size and dedication of their small, devoted fan base."

The Fall influenced groups and artists such as Pavement, Franz Ferdinand, Black Country, New Road, Yung Lean, Happy Mondays, Sonic Youth, These New Puritans, LCD Soundsystem, as well as the Russian group Grazhdanskaya Oborona. Sonic Youth covered three Fall songs (and "Victoria" by the Kinks, also covered by the Fall) in a 1988 Peel session, which was released in 1990 as an EP, "4 Tunna Brix", on Sonic Youth's own Goofin' label. The Pixies covered "Big New Prinz" during their 2013 world tour. The 1990s indie acts Pavement (who recorded a version of "The Classical") and Elastica (Smith contributed vocals to their final EP and album) showed an influence of the Fall, while Suede parodied the band with "Implement Yeah!", a song found on the cassette edition of their 1999 single "Electricity". Mark E. Smith's talk-singing style was later credited with inspiring the 2010s post-punk revival or "Post-Brexit New Wave".

== Members ==
Since the Fall formed in 1976, Mark E. Smith was the only constant member. All of the other founding members had left by the end of 1979, although Martin Bramah returned to the band from 1989 to 1990. Of the 66 musicians who came and went over the band's 40-year existence, about one third played in the band for less than a year. The final line-up consisted of Smith, Pete Greenway, Dave Spurr, Keiron Melling and Michael Clapham. Melling, Spurr and Greenway joined the band in 2006.

It was once remarked in an oft-misquoted Smith (but actually stemming from John Peel) quip about the band's frequent lineup changes, "If it's me and your granny on bongos, it's The Fall."

== Discography ==
Studio albums

- Live at the Witch Trials (1979)
- Dragnet (1979)
- Grotesque (After the Gramme) (1980)
- Hex Enduction Hour (1982)
- Room to Live (1982)
- Perverted by Language (1983)
- The Wonderful and Frightening World Of... (1984)
- This Nation's Saving Grace (1985)
- Bend Sinister (1986)
- The Frenz Experiment (1988)
- I Am Kurious Oranj (1988)
- Extricate (1990)
- Shift-Work (1991)
- Code: Selfish (1992)
- The Infotainment Scan (1993)
- Middle Class Revolt (1994)
- Cerebral Caustic (1995)
- The Light User Syndrome (1996)
- Levitate (1997)
- The Marshall Suite (1999)
- The Unutterable (2000)
- Are You Are Missing Winner (2001)
- The Real New Fall LP (Formerly Country on the Click) (2003)
- Fall Heads Roll (2005)
- Reformation Post TLC (2007)
- Imperial Wax Solvent (2008)
- Your Future Our Clutter (2010)
- Ersatz GB (2011)
- Re-Mit (2013)
- Sub-Lingual Tablet (2015)
- New Facts Emerge (2017)

== Bibliography ==
- Devereux, Eoin; Power, Martin J. (2023). Always different, always the same: critical essays on The Fall. Popular musics matter. Lanham: Rowman & Littlefield. ISBN 978-1-5381-6535-5.
- Smith, Mark E. (1985). The Fall Lyrics. Berlin: Lough Press.
- Edge, Brian (1989). Paintwork: A Portrait of The Fall. London: Omnibus Press. ISBN 0-7119-1740-X.
- Ford, Simon (2003). Hip Priest: The Story of Mark E Smith and The Fall. London: Quartet Books. ISBN 0-7043-8167-2.
- Hanley, Steve. "The Big Midweek: Life Inside The Fall". London: Route, 2014. ISBN 978-1-9019-2758-0
- Heylin, Clinton (2007). Babylon's Burning: From Punk to Grunge. New York: Viking Press. ISBN 978-0-14-102431-8.
- Middles, Mick; Smith, Mark E. (2003). The Fall. London: Omnibus Press. ISBN 0-7119-9762-4.
- Thompson, Dave (2003). A User's Guide to The Fall. London: Helter Skelter Publishing. ISBN 1-900924-57-9.
- Smith, Mark E. (2008). Renegade: The Lives and Tales of Mark E. Smith. New York: Viking Press. ISBN 978-0-670-91674-0.
- Simpson, Dave (2008). The Fallen – Searching for the Missing Members of The Fall. London: Canongate Books. ISBN 978-1-84767-049-6. (released in paperback format as The Fallen: Life in and Out of Britain's Most Insane Group, ISBN 978-1-84767-144-8)
- Goddard, Michael; Halligan, Benjamin, eds. (2010). Mark E. Smith and The Fall: Art, Music and Politics. Farnham: Ashgate. ISBN 978-0-7546-6862-6.
