= Karl Burns =

British musician (born 1958)

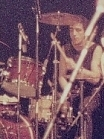
- Karl Burns performing as part of The Fall in 1984

Background information
- Born: 19 March 1958 (age 68); Manchester, England
- Genres: Post-punk
- Occupation: Musician
- Instruments: Drums, guitar, bass guitar, percussion, keyboards, vocals

Karl Burns (born 19 March 1958) is a British musician best known as the drummer for The Fall, featuring in many incarnations of the band between 1977 and 1998.

Although several musicians have rejoined the Fall having previously left or been fired, Burns was reportedly rehired a record nine times. He eventually left for good, alongside long-time bassist Steve Hanley, following an on-stage altercation with lead singer Mark E. Smith in New York in April 1998.

== Musical career ==
Prior to The Fall, Burns played with founding member Martin Bramah in a group called Nuclear Angel. He joined The Fall in July 1977, replacing Steve Ormrod after a few gigs, and became their first permanent drummer. Burns is heard on the Fall's first two singles and their first studio album Live at the Witch Trials.

Burns left in early 1979, before the release of Live at the Witch Trials, joining The Teardrops, with Steve Garvey of Buzzcocks, with whom he formed a brief and parallel project, Bok Bok, and remained in the band until 1981, when they broke up. Burns also played with Manchester band Mellatron (aka Mellotron; an unreleased EP was produced by Pete Shelley) & Elti Fits and, briefly, with John Lydon's Public Image Limited (PIL) in September 1979, but left because he did not get along with other members, including guitarist Keith Levene and bass guitarist Jah Wobble, the latter of whom was long alleged to have attempted to set Burns on fire, although Wobble denied this in 2007.

Burns rejoined the Fall in 1981, initially as a temporary replacement for Paul Hanley who was refused a visa for an American tour due to being too young. Recordings from this tour were released as A Part of America Therein, 1981. Upon the group's return to the UK, Smith invited Burns to stay on and The Fall appeared with two drummers until Paul Hanley's departure in late 1984; Burns would also sometimes play a second guitar or bass guitar during that period. His second tenure in The Fall coincided with a string of critically acclaimed releases, including Hex Enduction Hour and This Nation's Saving Grace. However, he left the band in early 1986 after an argument with Smith, to be replaced by Simon Wolstencroft. After his exit, Burns briefly collaborated with Martin Bramah under the name Thirst, and eventually quit music for several years, becoming a motorcycle courier.

Burns made an unexpected return to The Fall in 1993, initially on electronic percussion but later played second drumkit alongside Wolstencroft as well as additional guitar, keyboards and contributed a rare lead vocal on "Stay Away (Ol' White Train)" on The Light User Syndrome. However, he was absent from some tours and recording sessions due to continuing clashes with Smith. Burns's last album with The Fall was 1997's Levitate, where he was brought in during the sessions after Wolstencroft quit the band. By that time, the group were struggling financially and on the verge of breaking up as Smith was in a poor form due to drug and alcohol abuse and frequently fought with other band members. This culminated in an infamous New York City concert in Brownies club on 7 April 1998, where Burns attacked Smith after the vocalist repeatedly and deliberately knocked one of Burns's cymbal stands to the floor. After the concert, Burns, Steve Hanley and guitarist Tommy Crooks immediately quit the band while Smith was briefly jailed for attacking the keyboardist Julia Nagle.

After his departure from The Fall, Burns was briefly involved in the band Ark together with Steve Hanley and Crooks, before effectively vanishing from the music business and the public eye. Burns was one of few ex-members of The Fall whom Dave Simpson was not able to find for his article "Excuse Me, Weren't You in The Fall?" (2006) and his book The Fallen (2008). Several ex-members feared that Burns was dead, although a rumour circulated that he lived in "the hills" in Rossendale. In an interview with The Stool Pigeon (issue 10, February 2007), Mark E. Smith stated that he had recently met Burns's mother; she confirmed that he was indeed alive, advising Smith that he "lives on a farm in the hills somewhere". After the publication of The Fallen, Burns contacted Simpson by email, requesting a copy of the book to a Rossendale address which he stressed was not his residence. Burns had already spoken to his former bandmate, Steve Hanley, by telephone and told him that he was married and working.

In October 2024, Martin Bramah posted a surprise recent photograph with Burns on his Facebook page; it was later revealed that Burns got back in touch with Bramah via email after reading an article about Bramah's new group House of All, which also includes ex-Fall members Steve and Paul Hanley, Simon Wolstencroft and Pete Greenway. According to Bramah, Burns was now "teetotal, drug-free, [quit smoking and became] really healthy"; he still played drums an hour a day in his bedroom, but "didn’t want to just jam with any old band, because he’s got standards". Burns then was invited to join the band as a third drummer alongside Wolstencroft and Paul Hanley in a rotating dual-drumming line-up. He contributed to House of All's third album, House of All Souls, released in February 2025, and made his first live appearances since 1998 with the band on their tour in support of the record.
