= List of the Fall band members =

List of band members

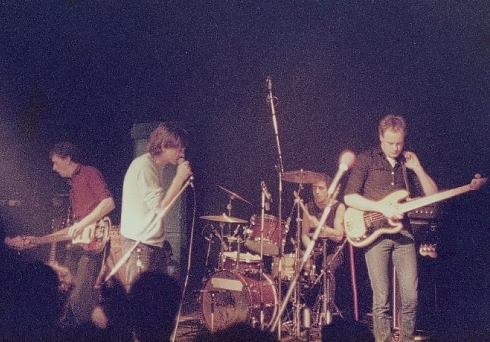
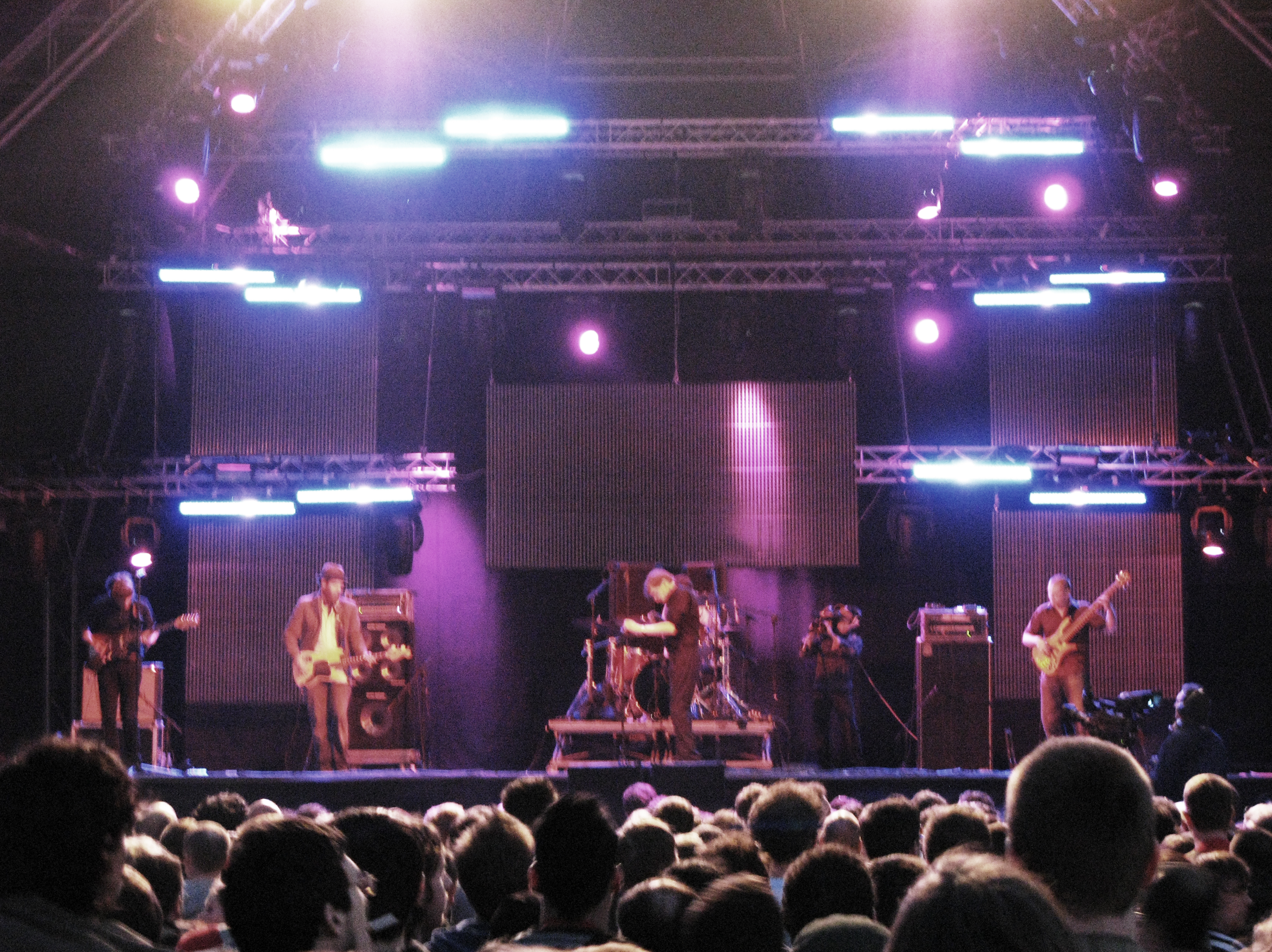
The Fall in 1984 (top) and 2007 (bottom).

The Fall were an English post-punk band from Prestwich, Greater Manchester. Formed in late 1976, the group originally featured vocalist Mark E. Smith, guitarist Martin Bramah, bassist Tony Friel and keyboardist Una Baines, with their first permanent drummer Karl Burns joining the following year. The group went through many lineup changes but remained active until Smith's death on 24 January 2018, at which point the band included bassist Dave "The Eagle" Spurr (since 2006), guitarist Peter "PP" Greenway, drummer Keiron Melling (both since 2007) and keyboardist Michael Clapham (who joined for the band's final tour in 2017).

== History ==
=== 1976–1982 ===
Mark E. Smith, Martin Bramah, Tony Friel and Una Baines formed the Fall shortly after attending a Sex Pistols show at Manchester's Free Trade Hall in July 1976. The band played their first show on 23 May 1977, with Steve Ormrod playing drums for his sole appearance. The group's first permanent drummer, Karl Burns, took his place. In November the group recorded their debut EP Bingo-Master's Break-Out!, which was issued the following year. Friel left the band in December, unhappy with the recent decision to hire Kay Carroll, a friend of Smith's, as their manager.

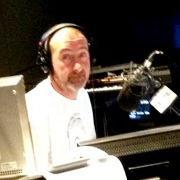
Marc Riley replaced original bassist Tony Friel in 1978, and later switched to guitar the following year.

After brief spells with Jonnie Brown and Eric McGann early in the year, 16-year-old roadie Marc Riley took over Friel's position on bass in June 1978. Baines had also left in March, following a "mental breakdown triggered in part by the druggy lifestyle she was leading". She was replaced by Yvonne Pawlett in May. The lineup of Smith, Bramah, Riley, Pawlett and Burns recorded the group's debut album Live at the Witch Trials, which was issued the following year. Burns left before the end of the year and Bramah followed in April 1979, claiming that "What initially started out as a collective became a dictatorship" dominated by frontman Smith.

Burns and Bramah were replaced by Mike Leigh and Craig Scanlon, respectively. At the time of Scanlon's arrival, Steve Hanley also joined on bass, with Riley switching to guitar. The new lineup recorded one single, "Rowche Rumble", before Pawlett also left the Fall. In an interview years later, the keyboardist claimed that she "never fitted in" with the group, leaving to study biology and breed dogs. Pawlett was not replaced, with Riley and Scanlon performing keyboards.

In March 1980, Leigh was replaced by Hanley's brother Paul on drums. The group issued Grotesque (After the Gramme) later in the year, followed by the EP Slates early the next year, featuring brief member Dave Tucker on clarinet. After replacing Paul Hanley for an American tour in the summer of 1981, due to the former being under the age of 21, Karl Burns rejoined the Fall in October 1981 to mark the start of the band's first two-drummer lineup. This incarnation issued two studio albums in 1982, Hex Enduction Hour and Room to Live, before Riley was sacked after a physical altercation with Smith, playing his final Fall show in December.

=== 1982–1995 ===
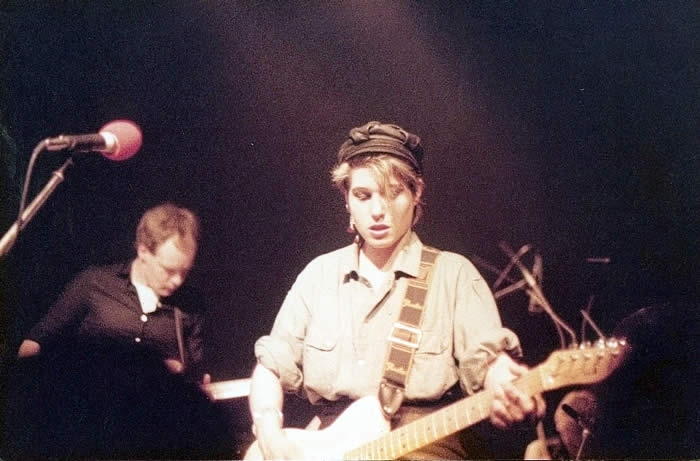
After Riley was fired in 1982, Mark E. Smith married Brix Smith in 1983 and she took his place in the Fall.

After several months with just one guitarist, the Fall added Brix Smith in the summer of 1983 after she married frontman Mark E. Smith in July, just three months since they first met. She debuted on two tracks on the 1983 album Perverted by Language, which was followed by The Wonderful and Frightening World Of... the next year. In November, shortly after the latter's release, Paul Hanley left the Fall to form Kiss the Blade, and the following month, his brother Steve Hanley went on paternity leave and was temporarily replaced by Simon Rogers. After a four-month absence, Hanley returned and Rogers joined officially on keyboards and guitar.

By early 1986, Karl Burns had left the Fall for a second time, with Simon Wolstencroft taking his place. Before Wolstencroft's arrival, however, Paul Hanley briefly returned to record two tracks for Bend Sinister, as well as the single "Living Too Late". Shortly after the release of Bend Sinister, Rogers left the group to focus on his production work, which he continued to do with the Fall for several years. With new keyboardist Marcia Schofield, the band released The Frenz Experiment and I Am Kurious Oranj in 1988, as well as a string of commercially successful singles including "There's a Ghost in My House", "Hit the North" and "Victoria".

In July 1989, it was announced that Brix Smith had left the Fall, with original guitarist Martin Bramah returning in her place. It was revealed later that Brix and Mark E. Smith had divorced earlier that year. Bramah performed on Extricate and remained until July 1990, when both he and Schofield (who by that time were dating each other) were fired from the band. Following the pair's departure, keyboards were handled primarily by Wolstencroft, as well as by violinist Kenny Brady, who joined at the same time. Dave Bush, who initially joined the Fall crew as a roadie, took over as the band's new keyboardist in August 1991.

After the release of Code: Selfish and The Infotainment Scan, Karl Burns returned for a second two-drummer lineup in May 1993. He left again just a few months later, but returned in time for a North American tour in August. After the release of Middle Class Revolt, Brix Smith also returned in August 1994, claiming she had "started to miss the artistic freedom that [she] had" in the group. After the band recorded Cerebral Caustic, Bush was replaced by Julia Nagle.

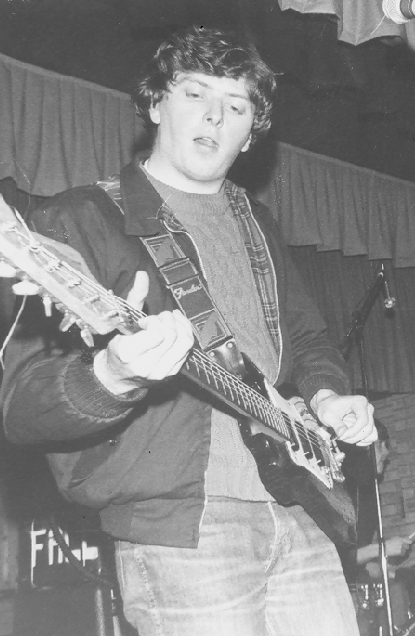
After nearly 16 years with the band, guitarist Craig Scanlon was fired from the Fall in late 1995.

=== 1995–2000 ===
After the band spent much of the year touring, long-time guitarist Craig Scanlon was dismissed from the Fall in late 1995. In later interviews, Mark E. Smith claimed that Scanlon's sacking after 16 years in the band was due to his "slovenly appearance" and "failure to maintain [his] amps", although he later changed his explanation by suggesting that the guitarist had been "trying to play jazz or Sonic Youth-style stuff over good simple songs that he'd written himself". It has been strongly suggested that Smith regretted his decision, and Scanlon himself said he was invited to re-join the group by Smith several years later, but declined. The Light User Syndrome was issued in 1996. Brix Smith left in October, following an argument with Mark E. Smith at a show in October. Karl Burns followed in December.

Adrian Flanagan took over as the Fall guitarist in December 1996, followed by Tommy Crooks the following May (when Burns also rejoined). The group continued touring until April 1998, when all but Smith and Nagle left the band following two shows in the United States which ended in fighting between band members. Before the planned final show in New York, Smith was arrested after allegedly assaulting Nagle, his girlfriend at the time, which resulted in the show's cancellation. A few weeks later, Smith and Nagle returned for three more shows in the UK, joined by temporary drummer Kate Themen.

After several months off, the Fall returned in August 1998 with new bassist Karen Leatham and drummer Tom Head, the latter of whom took over from Themen who was originally hired on a full-time basis after her first three shows. By the following January, Neville Wilding was the band's new guitarist and Leatham had been replaced by Adam Helal, with both new members joining officially after performing on The Marshall Suite as session musicians. Head was briefly sacked ahead of the 1999 Reading Festival, with Nick Dewey taking his place for the show, before he was reinstated the following day in time for the Leeds date.

=== 2000–2018 ===
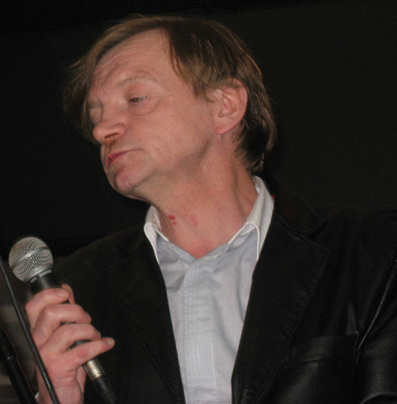
Frontman Mark E. Smith remained the sole constant member of the Fall throughout the band's tenure.

Shortly after the release of The Unutterable in November 2000, Tom Head was replaced by Spencer Birtwistle. By February the next year, Neville Wilding and Adam Helal had also been replaced, by Birtwistle's Trigger Happy bandmates Ben Pritchard and Jim Watts, respectively. By August, keyboardist and guitarist Julia Nagle had left the Fall after six years with the band. Brian Fanning briefly took over the vacated role of second guitarist, but by October had left again, shortly before Birtwistle was replaced by Dave Milner on drums. Milner was another former member of Trigger Happy featuring Pritchard, Watts and the Fall's manager Ed Blaney.

In September 2002, the Fall played one show with two new keyboardists – Smith's girlfriend Elena Poulou alongside Ruth Daniel. Retaining only Poulou on a full-time basis, the group issued The Real New Fall LP (Formerly Country on the Click) in 2003. Watts was fired that March and replaced by Simon "Ding" Archer the next month. After just a year with the band, Archer left the following April and was replaced by Steve Trafford. In July 2004, Watts returned on guitar and Birtwistle returned on drums. By December, the former had left for a second time, crediting concerns over credits and royalties, as well as a lack of creative input in the band.

The Fall's lineup changed dramatically again in May 2005, after Pritchard, Trafford and Birtwistle all left the band suddenly following a show in the US. The trio were quickly replaced by Tim Presley, Rob Barbato (both members of American group Darker My Love) and Orpheo McCord, respectively. Later in the year, guitarist Peter Greenway, bassist Dave Spurr and drummer Keiron Melling all debuted with the Fall, due to the new members' differing schedules. After the release of Reformation Post TLC (featuring Greenway and Spurr), the three new additions became full-time members upon the departure of Presley, Barbato and McCord in June 2007.

For almost ten years the Fall's lineup remained stable, making it the longest-standing incarnation of the band's history. Daren Garratt of the Nightingales joined as a second drummer between 2013 and 2015, featuring on The Remainderer, Sub-Lingual Tablet and Wise Ol' Man. Paul Bonney of the Australian Pink Floyd Show took over for tour dates in 2016. The lineup came to an end with the departure of long-time keyboardist Elena Poulou in 2016, after her divorce from Mark E. Smith. Keyboards on the band's final studio album New Facts Emerge were recorded by Greenway (synthesisers) and Spurr (mellotron), before Mike Clapham joined for the final touring cycle in 2017.

On 24 January 2018, Smith died of lung and kidney cancer, marking the end of the Fall.

== Members ==
Image	Name	Years active	Instruments	Release contributions
	Mark E. Smith	1976–2018 (until his death)	lead vocals; occasional guitar, keyboards, piano, violin, kazoo and harmonica	all Fall releases
	Martin Bramah	1976–1979; 1989–1990	guitar; backing vocals; bass (May 1978)	Studio albums: Live at the Witch Trials (1979); Extricate (1990); Shift-Work (1991) – one track only; Singles and EPs: Bingo-Master's Break-Out! (1978); "It's the New Thing" (1978); The Peel Sessions (1987); "White Lightning" (1990); The Dredger (1990); Live albums and videos: Short Circuit: Live at the Electric Circus (1978); Live 1977 (2000); Liverpool 78 (2001); Live in Zagreb (2001); Live at Deeply Vale (2005); Oldham 1978 (2005); Other releases: The Complete Peel Sessions 1978–2004 (2005) – two sessions
	Una Baines	1976–1978 (stand-in 1979)	keyboards; backing vocals	Short Circuit: Live at the Electric Circus (1978); Bingo-Master's Break-Out! (1978); Live 1977 (2000)
	Tony Friel	1976–1977	bass; backing vocals	Short Circuit: Live at the Electric Circus (1978); Bingo-Master's Break-Out! (1978); Live 1977 (2000)
	Steve Ormrod	1977 (died 1994)	drums	1970s (2022) – disc "North West Arts - Manchester 23/5/1977"
	Karl Burns	1977–1978; 1981–1986; 1993–1996; 1997–1998	drums; percussion; bass; guitar; backing vocals	Studio albums: Live at the Witch Trials (1979); all from Hex Enduction Hour (1982) to This Nation's Saving Grace (1985), and from Middle Class Revolt (1994) to Levitate (1997); Singles and EPs: Bingo-Master's Break-Out! (1978); "It's the New Thing" (1978); all from "Lie Dream of a Casino Soul" (1981) to "Cruiser's Creek" (1985); The Peel Sessions (1987); "The Chiselers" (1996); Live albums and videos: Short Circuit: Live at the Electric Circus (1978); A Part of America Therein, 1981 (1982); Fall in a Hole (1983); all from The Twenty-Seven Points (1995) to Live Various Years (1998); Live 1977 (2000); Austurbæjarbíó (2001); Liverpool 78 (2001); The Idiot Joy Show (2003); Live at the Phoenix Festival (2003); all from Pearl City (2005) to Oldham 1978 (2005); Set of Ten (2018) – five discs; Another "Set of Ten" (2019) – three discs; Other releases: The Complete Peel Sessions 1978–2004 (2005) – eight sessions
	Jonnie Brown	1978	bass	none – live performances only
	Eric McGann (real name Rick Goldstraw)	1978	bass	none – live performances only
	Yvonne Pawlett	1978–1979	keyboards	Studio albums: Live at the Witch Trials (1979); Singles and EPs: "It's the New Thing" (1978); "Rowche Rumble" (1979); The Peel Sessions (1987); Live albums and videos: Liverpool 78 (2001); Live at Deeply Vale (2005); Oldham 1978 (2005); Other releases: The Complete Peel Sessions 1978–2004 (2005) – two sessions
	Marc Riley	1978–1982	bass (1978–79); lead guitar (1979–82); keyboards; backing vocals	Studio albums: all from Live at the Witch Trials (1979) to Room to Live (1982); Singles and EPs: all from "It's the New Thing" (1978) to "Look, Know" (1982); The Peel Sessions (1987); Live albums and videos: all from Totale's Turns (1980) to Fall in a Hole (1983); Live to Air in Melbourne '82 (1998); Liverpool 78 (2001); Live at Leeds (2003); all from Live at Deeply Vale (2005) to Alter Bahnhof, Hof, Germany (2005); Set of Ten (2018) – three discs; Other releases: The Complete Peel Sessions 1978–2004 (2005) – four sessions
	Mike Leigh	1979–1980	drums; percussion	Studio albums: Dragnet (1979); Singles and EPs: "Rowche Rumble" (1980); "Fiery Jack" (1980); Live albums and videos: Totale's Turns (It's Now or Never) (1980); Retford 1979 (2005); Los Angeles 1979 (2005)
	Steve Hanley	1979–1998	bass; backing vocals; occasional acoustic guitar	Studio albums: all from Dragnet (1979) to Levitate (1997); Singles and EPs: all from "Rowche Rumble" (1979) to "The Chiselers" (1996), except Couldn't Get Ahead (1985) and The Peel Sessions (1987); Live albums and videos: all from Totale's Turns (1980) to Nottingham 92 (1998); I Am as Pure as Oranj (2000); Live in Cambridge 1988 (2000); Austurbæjarbíó (2001); Live in Zagreb (2001); Live at Leeds (2003); The Idiot Joy Show (2003); Live at the Phoenix Festival (2003); Pearl City (2004); Live at the Haćienda 1983–1985 (2005); all from Retford 1979 (2005) to Alter Bahnhof, Hof, Germany (2005); Set of Ten (2018) – eight discs; Another "Set of Ten" (2019) – three discs; Other releases: The Complete Peel Sessions 1978–2004 (2005) – 18 sessions
	Craig Scanlon	1979–1995	guitar (rhythm 1979–82 and 1983–95, lead 1982–83); keyboards; backing vocals	Studio albums: all from Dragnet (1979) to Cerebral Caustic (1995); Singles and EPs: all from "Rowche Rumble" (1979) to "The Chiselers" (1996), except The Peel Sessions (1987); Live albums and videos: all from Totale's Turns (1980) to In the City... (1997); Live to Air in Melbourne '82 (1998); Live Various Years (1998); Nottingham 92 (1998); I Am as Pure as Oranj (2000); Live in Cambridge 1988 (2000); Austurbæjarbíó (2001); Live in Zagreb (2001); Live at Leeds (2003); The Idiot Joy Show (2003); Live at the Phoenix Festival (2003); Live at the Haćienda 1983–1985 (2005); all from Retford 1979 (2005) to Alter Bahnhof, Hof, Germany (2005); Set of Ten (2018) – six discs; Another "Set of Ten" (2019) – two discs; Other releases: The Complete Peel Sessions 1978–2004 (2005) – 15 sessions
	Paul Hanley	1980–1985 (stand-in 1986)	drums; percussion; keyboards; programming; guitar; backing vocals	Studio albums: all from Grotesque (After the Gramme) (1980) to The Wonderful and Frightening World Of... (1984); Bend Sinister (1986) – one track only; Singles and EPs: all from "How I Wrote 'Elastic Man'" (1980) to Call for Escape Route (1984); "Living Too Late" (1986); Live albums and videos: Live in London 1980 (1982); Fall in a Hole (1983); Live to Air in Melbourne '82 (1998); Austurbæjarbíó (2001); Live at Leeds (2003); Live at the Haçienda 1983–1985 (2005); Glasgow 1981 (2005); Alter Bahnhof, Hof, Germany (2005); Set of Ten (2018) – two discs; Another "Set of Ten" (2019) – one disc; Other releases: The Complete Peel Sessions 1978–2004 (2005) – five sessions
	Brix Smith	1983–1989; 1994–1996	lead guitar; keyboards; bass; backing and occasional lead vocals	Studio albums: all from Perverted by Language (1983) – two tracks only to I Am Kurious Oranj (1988); Cerebral Caustic (1995); The Light User Syndrome (1996); Singles and EPs: all from "Oh! Brother" (1984) to "Hit the North" (1987), except The Peel Sessions (1987); Live albums and videos: all from Seminal Live (1989) to 15 Ways to Leave Your Man: Live (1997); Live Various Years (1998) – three tracks only; I Am as Pure as Oranj (2000); Live in Cambridge 1988 (2000); The Idiot Joy Show (2003); Live at the Phoenix Festival (2003); Pearl City (2004); Live at the Haćienda 1983–1985 (2005); Set of Ten (2018) – two discs; Another "Set of Ten" (2019) – three discs; Other releases: The Complete Peel Sessions 1978–2004 (2005) – nine sessions
	Simon Rogers	1985–1986 (stand-in 1984–85, session guest 1986–92)	keyboards; bass; guitar; programming; saxophone; backing vocals	Studio albums: This Nation's Saving Grace (1985); Bend Sinister (1986); The Frenz Experiment (1988); Code: Selfish (1992); Singles and EPs: all from "Couldn't Get Ahead/Rollin' Dany" (1985) to "Hey! Luciani" (1987); "Hit the North" (1987); "Ed's Babe" (1992); Live albums and videos: The Twenty-Seven Points (1995) – one track only; Live at the Haćienda 1983–1985 (2005); Other releases: The Complete Peel Sessions 1978–2004 (2005) – four sessions
	Simon Wolstencroft	1986–1997	drums; percussion; keyboards; programming; backing vocals	Studio albums: all from Bend Sinister (1986) to Levitate (1997); Singles and EPs: all from "Hey! Luciani" (1987) to "The Chiselers" (1996), except The Peel Sessions (1987); Live albums and videos: all from Seminal Live (1989) to 15 Ways to Leave Your Man: Live (1995); Live Various Years (1998); Nottingham 92 (1998); I Am as Pure as Oranj (2000); Live in Cambridge 1988 (2000); Live in Zagreb (2001); The Idiot Joy Show (2003); Live at the Phoenix Festival (2003); Pearl City (2004); Set of Ten (2018) – four discs; Another "Set of Ten" (2019) – two discs; Other releases: The Complete Peel Sessions 1978–2004 (2005) – 11 sessions
	Marcia Schofield	1986–1990	keyboards; synthesisers; percussion; backing vocals	Studio albums: all from The Frenz Experiment (1988) to Shift-Work (1991) – one track only; Singles and EPs: all from "There's a Ghost in My House" (1987) to The Dredger (1990), except The Peel Sessions (1987); Live albums and videos: Seminal Live (1989); Live Various Years (1998) – three tracks only; I Am as Pure as Oranj (2000); Live in Cambridge 1988 (1990); Live in Zagreb (2001); Other releases: The Complete Peel Sessions 1978–2004 (2005) – two sessions
	Kenny Brady	1990–1991 (guest 1989)	violin; backing vocals	Extricate (1990); Shift-Work (1991); The Twenty-Seven Points (1995) – one track only; The Complete Peel Sessions 1978–2004 (2005) – two sessions
	Dave Bush	1991–1995	keyboards; programming; backing vocals	Studio albums: all from Shift-Work (1991) to Cerebral Caustic (1995); Singles and EPs: "Ed's Babe" (1992); "Kimble" (1993); Live albums and videos: The Twenty-Seven Points (1995) – three tracks only; Nottingham 92 (1998); Set of Ten (2018) – two discs; Another "Set of Ten" (2019) – one disc; Other releases: The Complete Peel Sessions 1978–2004 (2005) – four sessions
	Julia Nagle	1995–2001	keyboards; programming; guitar; backing vocals	Studio albums: all from The Light User Syndrome (1996) to The Unutterable (2000); Singles and EPs: "The Chiselers" (1996); Live albums and videos: The Twenty-Seven Points (1995); In the City... (1997); 15 Ways to Leave Your Man: Live (1997); Live Various Years (1998) – five tracks only; Touch Sensitive... Bootleg Box Set (2003) – three discs; The Idiot Joy Show (2003); Live at the Phoenix Festival (2003); Pearl City (2004); Set of Ten (2018) – six discs; Another "Set of Ten" (2019) – one disc; Other releases: The Complete Peel Sessions 1978–2004 (2005) – four sessions
	Adrian Flanagan	1996–1997	guitar; backing vocals	Live Various Years (1998) – five tracks only
	Tommy Crooks	1997–1998	guitar; backing vocals	Levitate (1997) – four tracks only; Set of Ten (2018) – one disc
	Kate Themen	1998	drums	none – live performances only
	Tom Head (real name Thomas Patrick Murphy)	1998–2000 (died 2015)	drums; percussion	The Marshall Suite (1999); The Unutterable (2000); The Complete Peel Sessions 1978–2004 (2005) – one session; Set of Ten (2018) – two discs
	Karen Leatham	1998	bass	The Marshall Suite (1999); Set of Ten (2018) – one disc
	Neville Wilding	1998–2001	guitar; backing vocals	The Marshall Suite (1999); The Unutterable (2000); Set of Ten (2018) – one disc
	Adam Helal	1998–2001	bass	The Marshall Suite (1999); The Unutterable (2000); Set of Ten (2018) – one disc
	Spencer Birtwistle	2000–2001; 2004–2006	drums	Studio albums: Are You Are Missing Winner (2001); Fall Heads Roll (2005); Singles and EPs: "Rude (All the Time)" (2001); "(We Wish You) A Protein Christmas" (2003); Rude (All the Time) (2005); "Higgle-Dy Piggle-Dy" (2006); Live albums and videos: 2G+2 (2002); Touch Sensitive... Bootleg Box Set (2003); Interim (2004); Knitting Factory 2001 (2004); Live in San Francisco (2013); Set of Ten (2018) – one disc; Another "Set of Ten" (2019) – one disc; Other releases: The Complete Peel Sessions 1978–2004 (2005) – one session
	Ben Pritchard	2001–2006 (guest 2000)	guitar; backing vocals	Studio albums: all from The Unutterable (2000) to Fall Heads Roll (2005); Singles and EPs: all from The Fall vs 2003 (2002) to "Higgle-Dy Piggle-Dy" (2006); Live albums and videos: 2G+2 (2002); Touch Sensitive... Bootleg Box Set (2003); all from A Touch Sensitive: Live (2004) to All Tomorrows Parties 2002 (2004); Live in San Francisco (2013); Set of Ten (2018) – one disc; Another "Set of Ten" (2019) – one disc; Other releases: The Complete Peel Sessions 1978–2004 (2005) – two sessions
	Jim Watts	2001–2003; 2004	bass (2001–03); rhythm guitar; programming; backing vocals	Studio albums: Are You Are Missing Winner (2001); The Real New Fall LP (2003); Singles and EPs: "Rude (All the Time)" (2001); The Fall vs 2003 (2002); Rude (All the Time) (2005); Live albums and videos: 2G+2 (2002); Touch Sensitive... Bootleg Box Set (2003); all from Live at the Garage 2002 (2004) to All Tomorrows Parties 2002 (2004); Live in San Francisco (2013); Set of Ten (2018) – one disc; Another "Set of Ten" (2019) – one disc; Other releases: The Complete Peel Sessions 1978–2004 (2005) – two sessions
	Brian Fanning	2001	guitar; backing vocals	Are You Are Missing Winner (2001); 2G+2 (2002) – three studio tracks only; Another "Set of Ten" (2019) – one disc
	Dave Milner	2001–2004	drums; percussion; keyboards; backing vocals	Studio albums: The Real New Fall LP (2003); Singles and EPs: The Fall vs 2003 (2002); "(We Wish You) A Protein Christmas" (2003); "Theme from Sparta F.C. #2" (2004); Live albums and videos: A Touch Sensitive: Live (2003); Punkcast 2004 (2004); Live at the Garage 2002 (2004); All Tomorrows Parties 2002 (2004); Other releases: The Complete Peel Sessions 1978–2004 (2005) – one session
	Elena Poulou	2002–2016	keyboards; synthesisers; backing and occasional lead vocals	Studio albums: all from The Real New Fall LP (2003) to Sub-Lingual Tablet (2015); Singles and EPs: all from The Fall vs 2003 (2002) to "Wise Ol' Man" (2016); Live albums and videos: A Touch Sensitive: Live (2003); Interim (2004); Last Night at The Palais (2009); Live Uurop VIII–XII Places in Sun & Winter, Son (2014); Live in Clitheroe (2017); Another "Set of Ten" (2019) – seven discs; Other releases: The Complete Peel Sessions 1978–2004 (2005) – two sessions
	Simon "Ding" Archer	2003–2004 (live guest 2008, session guest 2013)	bass; backing vocals; occasional banjo	The Real New Fall LP (2003) – one track only; "(We Wish You) A Protein Christmas" (2003); "Theme from Sparta F.C. #2" (2004); Fall Heads Roll (2005) – three tracks only; The Remainderer (2013)
	Steve Trafford	2004–2006	bass; rhythm guitar; backing vocals	Punkcast 2004 (2004); Interim (2004); The Complete Peel Sessions 1978–2004 (2005) – one session; Fall Heads Roll (2005); "Higgle-Dy Piggle-Dy" (2006)
	Tim Presley	2006–2007 (stand-in 2011, session guest 2013)	guitar	Studio albums: Reformation Post TLC (2007); Re-Mit (2013) – three tracks only; Sub-Lingual Tablet (2015) – one track only; Singles and EPs: "Fall Sound" (2007); "Night of the Humerons" (2012); Live albums and videos: Last Night at The Palais (2009); Another "Set of Ten" (2019) – one disc
	Rob Barbato	2006–2007 (stand-in 2013)	bass	Studio albums: Reformation Post TLC (2007); Sub-Lingual Tablet (2015) – one track only; Singles and EPs: "Fall Sound" (2007); Live albums and videos: Last Night at The Palais (2009); Another "Set of Ten" (2019) – one disc
	Orpheo McCord	2006–2007	drums; percussion; backing vocals	Reformation Post TLC (2007); "Fall Sound" (2007); Last Night at The Palais (2009)
	Dave "The Eagle" Spurr	2006–2018	bass; backing vocals; mellotron (2017)	Studio albums: all from Reformation Post TLC (2007) to New Facts Emerge (2017); Singles and EPs: all from "Fall Sound" (2007) to Wise Ol' Man (2016); Live albums and videos: Last Night at The Palais (2009); Live Uurop VIII–XII Places in Sun & Winter, Son (2014); Live in Clitheroe (2017); Another "Set of Ten" (2019) – six discs
	Peter "PP" Greenway	2007–2018 (guest 2006–07)	guitar; backing vocals; synthesisers (2017)	Studio albums: all from Reformation Post TLC (2007) to New Facts Emerge (2017); Singles and EPs: all from "Bury!" (2010) to Wise Ol' Man (2016); Live albums and videos: Last Night at The Palais (2009); Live Uurop VIII–XII Places in Sun & Winter, Son (2014); Live in Clitheroe (2017); Another "Set of Ten" (2019) – six discs
	Keiron Melling	2007–2018 (guest 2006)	drums; percussion	Studio albums: all from Imperial Wax Solvent (2008) to New Facts Emerge (2017); Singles and EPs: all from "Bury!" (2010) to Wise Ol' Man (2016); Live albums and videos: Live Uurop VIII–XII Places in Sun & Winter, Son (2014); Live in Clitheroe (2017); Another "Set of Ten" (2019) – seven discs
	Daren Garratt	2013–2015	drums; percussion; backing vocals	The Remainderer (2013)| Sub-Lingual Tablet (2015)| Wise Ol' Man (2016)

=== Other contributors ===
Image	Name	Years active	Instruments	Details
	Steve "Cowbell" Davies	1978; 1980	congas (1978); drums (1980)	Davies, the band's van driver at the time, performed congas on the band's first Peel session in May 1978, and later filled in for temporarily unavailable drummer Paul Hanley on a Dutch tour in June 1980.
	Kay Carroll	1979–1983	vocals; percussion; kazoo	The Fall's manager and Smith's partner between 1977 and 1983, Carroll performed as an additional contributor on Dragnet, Grotesque (After the Gramme), Slates, Hex Enduction Hour and Room to Live.
	Dave Tucker	1980–1981	clarinet; keyboards; guitar; backing vocals	Tucker was a part-time member of the Fall, contributing to the Slates EP and several live shows.
	Richard Mazda	1981	saxophone	Mazda performed saxophone on the single "Lie Dream of a Casino Soul", which he also produced.
	Adrian Niman	1982	saxophone	Niman featured on Room to Live, on the title track.
	Arthur Kadmon	1982	guitar	Kadmon featured on Room to Live, on "Hard Life Country".
	Gavin Friday (real name Fionán Hanvey)	1984	vocals	Friday featured on two tracks for The Wonderful and Frightening World Of... and one for the Call for Escape Route EP, as well as appearing live with the band on a couple of occasions.
	Craig Leon	1989–1991	keyboards; rhythm guitar; backing vocals	Leon co-produced Extricate, Shift-Work and Code: Selfish, and performed on all three albums.
	Cassell Webb	1989–1991	backing vocals; keyboards	Webb, the wife of Leon, also featured as a guest on Extricate, Shift-Work and Code: Selfish.
	Phil Ames	1989	guitar	Ames, Brix Smith's guitar tech, performed at a recording for the Offbeat TV series in February 1989.
	Mike Edwards	1989	guitar	Edwards featured on "Popcorn Double Feature", the second single from the 1990 album Extricate.
	Charlotte Bill	1990	flute; oboe	Bill performed flute and oboe on the 1990 album Extricate, and also appeared at several live shows.
	Kevin "Skids" Riddles	1990	keyboards	Riddles, a roadie for the band at the time, played a handful of Fall shows after Marcia Schofield left.
	Lucy Rimmer	1994–1996	backing vocals	Both featured on Cerebral Caustic and The Light User Syndrome, as well as at several shows.
	Mike Bennett	1994–1996	backing vocals	Both featured on Cerebral Caustic and The Light User Syndrome, as well as at several shows.
	Keir Stewart	1997	keyboards	Stewart and Spencer performed at a handful of shows each in February and May 1997, respectively.
	Simon Spencer	1997 (died 2005)	guitar	Stewart and Spencer performed at a handful of shows each in February and May 1997, respectively.
	Andy Hackett	1997	guitar	Hackett performed guitar on select tracks on 1997's Levitate, but never performed live with the band.
	Damon Gough	1997	guitar	Gough performed additional guitar on "Calendar", a B-side to the 1998 single "Masquerade".
	John Rolleson	1998	backing vocals	Rolleson appeared with the band at the recording of their 21st Peel session on 3 February 1998.
	Stuart Estell	1998	guitar	Estell joined the band for an encore on 30 April 1998 after attending a show in Reading as a fan.
	Elspeth Hughes	1998–1999	special effects	Hughes featured on the band's 22nd Peel session, and later on the album The Marshall Suite.
	Nick Dewey	1999	drums	After Tom Head was briefly fired, Dewey substituted for the drummer at the 1999 Reading Festival.
	Steve Evets	2000–2003	bass; backing vocals	Evets performed backing vocals on The Unutterable and Are You Are Missing Winner, and later played bass at select shows in 2002 and at a show in Turkey in March 2003 after Jim Watts was sacked.
	Ed Blaney	2000–2001; 2003–2004	guitar; backing vocals	The Fall's manager at the time, Blaney performed with the band on occasion, featuring on "Rude (All the Time)", Are You Are Missing Winner, the studio tracks on 2G+2, and a number of live albums.
	Ruth Daniel	2002	keyboards	Daniel performed as a guest alongside Elena Poulou at the Fall's show on 29 September 2002.
	Dougie James	2004–2006	vocals	James performed on "Big New Prinz" and "Boxoctosis" at shows between 2004 and 2006.
	Sean O'Neal	2004	vocals	O'Neal appeared at the 1 May 2004 Fall show in Austin, Texas, performing on "Dr. Buck's Letter".
	Tamsin Middleton	2013	backing vocals	Middleton and Simon Archer contributed backing vocals to "Touchy Pad" on the EP The Remainderer.
	Paul Bonney	2016–2017	drums	Bonney performed as a second drummer at several Fall shows between July 2016 and January 2017.
	Pamela Vander	2017	percussion; backing vocals	Vander, Smith's final partner and manager, contributed to several Fall shows during their 2017 tour.
	Mike Clapham	2017–2018	keyboards	Clapham joined the band for touring in 2017.

== Lineups ==
Period	Members	Releases
Late 1976 – May 1977	Mark E. Smith – lead vocals, guitar; Martin Bramah – guitar, backing vocals; Tony Friel – bass, backing vocals; Una Baines – keyboards, backing vocals	none – rehearsals only
April – June 1977	Mark E. Smith – lead vocals; Martin Bramah – guitar, backing vocals; Tony Friel – bass, backing vocals; Una Baines – keyboards, backing vocals; Steve Ormrod – drums	
June – December 1977	Mark E. Smith – lead vocals; Martin Bramah – guitar, backing vocals; Tony Friel – bass, backing vocals; Una Baines – keyboards, backing vocals; Karl Burns – drums	Short Circuit: Live at the Electric Circus (1978); Bingo-Master's Break-Out! (1978); Live 1977 (2000)
January – March 1978	Mark E. Smith – lead vocals; Martin Bramah – guitar, backing vocals; Jonnie Brown – bass; Una Baines – keyboards, backing vocals; Karl Burns – drums, backing vocals	none – live performances only
March – May 1978	Mark E. Smith – lead vocals, keyboards; Martin Bramah – guitar, backing vocals; Eric McGann – bass; Karl Burns – drums	none – live performances only
May – June 1978	Mark E. Smith – lead vocals; Martin Bramah – guitar, bass, backing vocals; Yvonne Pawlett – keyboards; Karl Burns – drums	The Complete Peel Sessions (2005) – session 1
June – December 1978	Mark E. Smith – lead vocals; Martin Bramah – guitar, backing vocals; Marc Riley – bass, backing vocals; Yvonne Pawlett – keyboards; Karl Burns – drums	"It's the New Thing" (1978); Live at the Witch Trials (1979); Liverpool 78 (2001); The Complete Peel Sessions (2005) – session 2; Live at Deeply Vale (2005); Oldham 1978 (2005)
February – April 1979	Mark E. Smith – lead vocals; Martin Bramah – guitar, backing vocals; Marc Riley – bass, backing vocals; Yvonne Pawlett – keyboards; Mike Leigh – drums, percussion	none – live performances only
February – April 1979	Una Baines – keyboards (4 April, substitute)	none – live performances only
April – July 1979	Mark E. Smith – lead vocals; Marc Riley – guitar, backing vocals; Craig Scanlon – guitar, backing vocals; Steve Hanley – bass, backing vocals; Yvonne Pawlett – keyboards; Mike Leigh – drums, percussion	"Rowche Rumble" (1979)
July 1979 – March 1980	Mark E. Smith – lead vocals; Marc Riley – guitar, keyboards, backing vocals; Craig Scanlon – guitar, keyboards, backing vocals; Steve Hanley – bass, backing vocals; Mike Leigh – drums, percussion	"Fiery Jack" (1980); Totale's Turns (It's Now or Never) (1980); Retford 1979 (2005); Los Angeles 1979 (2005)
July 1979 – March 1980	Kay Carroll – percussion, backing vocals (session guest)	Dragnet (1979)
March 1980 – September 1981	Mark E. Smith – lead vocals; Marc Riley – guitar, keyboards, backing vocals; Craig Scanlon – guitar, keyboards, backing vocals; Steve Hanley – bass, backing vocals; Paul Hanley – drums	"How I Wrote 'Elastic Man'" (1980); "Totally Wired" (1980); Live in London 1980 (1982); Live at Leeds (2003); The Complete Peel Sessions (2005) – sessions 3, 5; Glasgow 1981 (2005); Alter Bahnhof, Hof, Germany (2005); Set of Ten (2018) – one disc
March 1980 – September 1981	Kay Carroll – percussion, backing vocals (session guest)	Grotesque (After the Gramme) (1980)
March 1980 – September 1981	Steve Davies – congas (11 May 1980, guest)	none – live performances only
March 1980 – September 1981	Steve Davies – drums (June 1980, substitute)	none – live performances only
March 1980 – September 1981	Dave Tucker – clarinet (from November 1980, part-time)	Slates (1981); The Complete Peel Sessions (2005) – session 4
March 1980 – September 1981	Karl Burns – drums (June – July 1981, substitute)	A Part of America Therein, 1981 (1982); Set of Ten (2018) – one disc
September 1981 – December 1982	Mark E. Smith – lead vocals; Marc Riley – guitar, keyboards, backing vocals; Craig Scanlon – guitar, backing vocals; Steve Hanley – bass, backing vocals; Paul Hanley – drums; Karl Burns – drums, bass, percussion	"Lie Dream of a Casino Soul" (1981); Fall in a Hole (1983); Live to Air in Melbourne '82 (1998); Set of Ten (2018) – one disc
September 1981 – December 1982	Kay Carroll – percussion, backing vocals (session guest)	Hex Enduction Hour (1982); "Look, Know" (1982); Room to Live (1982)
January – September 1983	Mark E. Smith – lead vocals; Craig Scanlon – guitar, keyboards, backing vocals; Steve Hanley – bass, backing vocals; Paul Hanley – drums, keyboards; Karl Burns – drums, bass, percussion, backing vocals	"The Man Whose Head Expanded" (1983); "Kicker Conspiracy" (1983); Perverted by Language (1983) – all but two tracks; Austurbæjarbíó (2001); Live at the Haçienda 1983–1985 (2004) – four tracks; The Complete Peel Sessions (2005) – session 6
September 1983 – November 1984	Mark E. Smith – lead vocals; Brix Smith – guitar, backing vocals; Craig Scanlon – guitar, keyboards, backing vocals; Steve Hanley – bass, backing vocals; Paul Hanley – drums, keyboards; Karl Burns – drums, bass, percussion	Perverted by Language (1983) – remaining two tracks; "Oh! Brother" (1984); "C.R.E.E.P." (1984); The Wonderful and Frightening World Of... (1984); Call for Escape Route (1984); Live at the Haçienda 1983–1985 (2004) – nine tracks; The Complete Peel Sessions (2005) – session 7; Another "Set of Ten" (2019) – one disc
November 1984 – March 1985	Mark E. Smith – lead vocals, keyboards; Brix Smith – guitar, keyboards, backing vocals; Craig Scanlon – guitar, keyboards, backing vocals; Karl Burns – drums; Simon Rogers – bass	"Couldn't Get Ahead/Rollin' Dany" (1985)
March 1985 – May 1986	Mark E. Smith – lead vocals; Brix Smith – guitar, keyboards, backing vocals; Craig Scanlon – guitar, keyboards, backing vocals; Steve Hanley – bass, backing vocals; Simon Rogers – keyboards, guitar; Karl Burns – drums	This Nation's Saving Grace (1985); "Cruiser's Creek" (1985); Live at the Haçienda 1983–1985 (2004) – seven tracks; The Complete Peel Sessions (2005) – sessions 8, 9
March 1985 – May 1986	Paul Hanley – drums, percussion (from February, substitute)	"Living Too Late" (1986); Bend Sinister (1986) – one track
May – October 1986	Mark E. Smith – lead vocals; Brix Smith – guitar, keyboards, backing vocals; Craig Scanlon – guitar, keyboards, backing vocals; Steve Hanley – bass, backing vocals; Simon Rogers – keyboards, guitar; Simon Wolstencroft – drums	Bend Sinister (1986) – remaining tracks; "Hey! Luciani" (1986); The Complete Peel Sessions (2005) – session 10
October 1986 – June 1989	Mark E. Smith – lead vocals; Brix Smith – guitar backing vocals; Craig Scanlon – guitar, backing vocals; Steve Hanley – bass, backing vocals; Marcia Schofield – keyboards, backing vocals; Simon Wolstencroft – drums, percussion; Simon Rogers – keyboards, guitar (1987 in studio and on stage for the UK tour)	"There's a Ghost in My House" (1987); "Hit the North" (1987); The Frenz Experiment (1988); I Am Kurious Oranj (1988); Seminal Live (1989); BBC Radio 1 Live in Concert (1993); Live Various Years (1998) – three tracks; I Am as Pure as Oranj (2000); Live in Cambridge 1988 (2000); The Complete Peel Sessions (2005) – sessions 11, 12
October 1986 – June 1989	Phil Ames – guitar (16 February 1989, replaced Brix who quit the group)	none – one TV performance only
June 1989 – July 1990	Mark E. Smith – lead vocals; Martin Bramah – guitar, backing vocals; Craig Scanlon – guitar, keyboards, backing vocals; Steve Hanley – bass, backing vocals; Marcia Schofield – keyboards, backing vocals; Simon Wolstencroft – drums, percussion	Extricate (1990); "White Lightning" (1990); Shift-Work (1991) – one track; Live in Zagbreb (2001)
June 1989 – July 1990	Kenny Brady – fiddle (guest in studio and several live gigs)	The Complete Peel Sessions (2005) – session 13
July 1990 – June 1991	Mark E. Smith – lead vocals; Craig Scanlon – guitar, keyboards, backing vocals; Steve Hanley – bass, backing vocals; Simon Wolstencroft – drums, percussion, keyboards; Kenny Brady – violin, keyboards	"High Tension Line" (1990); Shift-Work (1991) – remaining tracks; The Complete Peel Sessions (2005) – session 14
July 1990 – June 1991	Kevin Riddles – keyboards (July – August, guest)	none – live performances only
August 1991 – May 1993	Mark E. Smith – lead vocals; Craig Scanlon – guitar, keyboards, backing vocals; Steve Hanley – bass, backing vocals; Dave Bush – keyboards, programming; Simon Wolstencroft – drums, percussion, keyboards	Code: Selfish (1992); "Ed's Babe" (1992); "Kimble" (1993); "Why Are People Grudgeful?" (1993); The Infotainment Scan (1993); Nottingham '92 (1998); The Complete Peel Sessions (2005) – sessions 15, 16
May 1993 – August 1994	Mark E. Smith – lead vocals; Craig Scanlon – guitar, keyboards, backing vocals; Steve Hanley – bass, backing vocals; Dave Bush – keyboards, programming; Simon Wolstencroft – drums, percussion, keyboards; Karl Burns – drums, guitar, backing vocals	Middle Class Revolt (1994); Live Various Years (1998) – six tracks; The Complete Peel Sessions (2005) – session 17; Set of Ten (2018) – two discs
August 1994 – November 1995	Mark E. Smith – lead vocals; Brix Smith – guitar, backing vocals; Craig Scanlon – guitar, keyboards, backing vocals; Steve Hanley – bass, backing vocals; Dave Bush – keyboards, programming; Simon Wolstencroft – drums, percussion, keyboards; Karl Burns – drums, guitar, backing vocals	Cerebral Caustic (1995); Another "Set of Ten" (2019) – one disc
August 1994 – November 1995	Lucy Rimmer – backing vocals (20 November 1994, guest)	The Complete Peel Sessions (2005) – session 18
August 1994 – November 1995	Julia Nagle – keyboards (from March 1995, substitute)	The Twenty-Seven Points (1995); "The Chiselers" (1996); In the City... (1997); The Idiot Joy Show (2003); Live at the Phoenix Festival (2003) – nine tracks; Set of Ten (2018) – one disc
November 1995 – October 1996	Mark E. Smith – lead vocals; Brix Smith – guitar, backing vocals; Steve Hanley – bass, backing vocals; Julia Nagle – keyboards, guitar, backing vocals; Simon Wolstencroft – drums, percussion, keyboards; Karl Burns – drums, guitar, backing vocals	15 Ways to Leave Your Man: Live (1997); Live at the Phoenix Festival (2003) – four tracks; Pearl City (2004); The Complete Peel Sessions (2005) – session 20; Set of Ten (2018) – one disc; Another "Set of Ten" (2019) – one disc
November 1995 – October 1996	Lucy Rimmer – backing vocals (part-time)	The Light User Syndrome (1996); The Complete Peel Sessions (2005) – session 19
November 1995 – October 1996	Mike Bennett – backing vocals (part-time)	The Light User Syndrome (1996)
December 1996 – February 1997	Mark E. Smith – lead vocals; Adrian Flanagan – guitar, backing vocals; Steve Hanley – bass, backing vocals; Julia Nagle – keyboards, guitar, backing vocals; Simon Wolstencroft – drums, percussion, keyboards	Live Various Years (1998) – five tracks
December 1996 – February 1997	Lucy Rimmer – keyboards (24 December, substitute)	none – one live performance only
February – May 1997	Mark E. Smith – lead vocals; Adrian Flanagan – guitar; Julia Nagle – guitar, keyboards, backing vocals; Steve Hanley – bass, backing vocals; Keir Stewart – keyboards; Simon Wolstencroft – drums, percussion, keyboards	none – live performances only
February – May 1997	Keir Stewart – keyboards (26 February, guest)	none – live performances only
February – May 1997	Simon Spencer – guitar (13 and 14 May, guest)	none – live performances only
May – July 1997	Mark E. Smith – lead vocals; Tommy Crooks – guitar, backing vocals; Steve Hanley – bass, backing vocals; Julia Nagle – keyboards, guitar, backing vocals; Simon Wolstencroft – drums, percussion, keyboards; Karl Burns – drums	Levitate (1997)
July 1997 – April 1998	Mark E. Smith – lead vocals; Tommy Crooks – guitar, backing vocals; Steve Hanley – bass, backing vocals; Julia Nagle – keyboards, guitar, backing vocals; Karl Burns – drums	Set of Ten (2018) – one disc
July 1997 – April 1998	John Rolleson – backing vocals (3 February, guest)	The Complete Peel Sessions (2005) – session 21
April – June 1998	Mark E. Smith – lead vocals; Julia Nagle – guitar, keyboards, backing vocals; Kate Themen – drums	none – live performances only
April – June 1998	Stuart Estell – guitar (30 April, guest)	none – live performances only
June – August 1998	Mark E. Smith – lead vocals; Julia Nagle – guitar, keyboards, backing vocals; Karen Leatham – bass; Kate Themen – drums	none – live performances only
August – December 1998	Mark E. Smith – lead vocals; Julia Nagle – guitar, keyboards, backing vocals; Karen Leatham – bass; Tom Head – drums, percussion, backing vocals	Set of Ten (2018) – one disc
August – December 1998	Elspeth Hughes – special effects (18 October, guest)	The Complete Peel Sessions (2005) – session 22
December 1998	Mark E. Smith – lead vocals; Neville Wilding – guitar, backing vocals; Karen Leatham – bass; Julia Nagle – keyboards, guitar, backing vocals; Tom Head – drums, percussion, backing vocals	none – one live performance only
December 1998 – January 1999	Mark E. Smith – lead vocals; Neville Wilding – guitar, backing vocals; Karen Leatham – bass; Adam Helal – bass, backing vocals; Julia Nagle – keyboards, guitar, backing vocals; Tom Head – drums, percussion, backing vocals	The Marshall Suite (1999)
January 1999 – November 2000	Mark E. Smith – lead vocals; Neville Wilding – guitar, backing vocals; Adam Helal – bass, backing vocals; Julia Nagle – keyboards, guitar, backing vocals; Tom Head – drums, percussion, backing vocals	The Unutterable (2000); Set of Ten (2018) – one disc
January 1999 – November 2000	Nick Dewey – drums (27 August 1999, substitute)	none – one live performance only
November 2000 – February 2001	Mark E. Smith – lead vocals; Neville Wilding – guitar, backing vocals; Adam Helal – bass, backing vocals; Julia Nagle – keyboards, guitar, backing vocals; Spencer Birtwistle – drums, percussion	none – live performances only
February – August 2001	Mark E. Smith – lead vocals; Ben Pritchard – guitar, backing vocals; Jim Watts – bass, guitar, backing vocals; Julia Nagle – keyboards, guitar, backing vocals; Spencer Birtwistle – drums, percussion	Touch Sensitive... Bootleg Box Set – three discs; Set of Ten (2018) – one disc; Another "Set of Ten" (2019) – one disc
August – October 2001	Mark E. Smith – lead vocals, keyboards; Ben Pritchard – guitar, backing vocals; Brian Fanning – guitar, backing vocals; Jim Watts – bass, guitar, backing vocals; Spencer Birtwistle – drums, percussion	Another "Set of Ten" (2019) – one disc
August – October 2001	Ed Blaney – guitar, backing vocals (part-time guest)	Are You Are Missing Winner (2001); 2G+2 (2002) – studio tracks
October – November 2001	Mark E. Smith – lead vocals, keyboards; Ben Pritchard – guitar, backing vocals; Jim Watts – bass, guitar, backing vocals; Spencer Birtwistle – drums, percussion	2G+2 (2002) – live tracks; Touch Sensitive... Bootleg Box Set (2003) – two discs; Knitting Factory, Hollywood 2001 (2004)
October – November 2001	Ed Blaney – guitar, backing vocals (part-time guest)	Rude (All the Time) (2005); Live in San Francisco (2013)
November 2001 – September 2002	Mark E. Smith – lead vocals; Ben Pritchard – guitar, backing vocals; Jim Watts – bass, guitar, backing vocals; Dave Milner – drums, keyboards, backing vocals; Ed Blaney – guitar, backing vocals (part-time guest)	Live at the Garage 2002 (2004); All Tomorrows Parties 2002 (2004)
September 2002 – March 2003	Mark E. Smith – lead vocals; Ben Pritchard – guitar, backing vocals; Jim Watts – bass, guitar, backing vocals; Elena Poulou – keyboards, backing vocals; Dave Milner – drums, keyboards, backing vocals	The Fall vs 2003 (2002); The Real New Fall LP (2003) – eight tracks; The Complete Peel Sessions (2005) – session 23
September 2002 – March 2003	Ed Blaney – guitar, backing vocals (part-time guest); Ruth Daniel – keyboards (22 September, guest)	A Touch Sensitive: Live (2004)
March 2003	Mark E. Smith – lead vocals; Ben Pritchard – guitar, backing vocals; Steve Evets – bass (temporary substitute); Elena Poulou – keyboards, backing vocals; Dave Milner – drums, keyboards, backing vocals	none – one live performance only
April 2003 – April 2004	Mark E. Smith – lead vocals; Ben Pritchard – guitar, backing vocals; Simon Archer – bass, backing vocals; Elena Poulou – keyboards, backing vocals; Dave Milner – drums, keyboards, backing vocals	The Real New Fall LP (2003) – four tracks; "(We Wish You) A Protein Christmas" (2003); "Theme from Sparta F.C. #2" (2004)
April 2003 – April 2004	Dougie James – vocals (22 February, guest)	none – one live performance only
April 2004	Mark E. Smith – lead vocals; Ben Pritchard – guitar, backing vocals; Simon Archer – bass, backing vocals; Steve Trafford – bass, backing vocals; Elena Poulou – keyboards, backing vocals; Dave Milner – drums, keyboards, backing vocals	none – live performances only
April – June 2004	Mark E. Smith – lead vocals; Ben Pritchard – guitar, backing vocals; Steve Trafford – bass, guitar, backing vocals; Elena Poulou – keyboards, backing vocals; Dave Milner – drums, backing vocals	Punkcast 2004 (2004)
April – June 2004	Sean O'Neal – vocals (1 May, guest)	none – one live performance only
July – December 2004	Mark E. Smith – lead vocals; Ben Pritchard – guitar, backing vocals; Jim Watts – guitar, backing vocals; Steve Trafford – bass, guitar, backing vocals; Elena Poulou – keyboards, backing vocals; Spencer Birtwistle – drums; Ed Blaney – guitar, backing vocals (part-time guest)	Interim (2004); The Complete Peel Sessions (2005) – session 24
January 2005 – May 2006	Mark E. Smith – lead vocals; Ben Pritchard – guitar, backing vocals; Steve Trafford – bass, guitar, backing vocals; Elena Poulou – keyboards, backing vocals; Spencer Birtwistle – drums	Fall Heads Roll (2005); "Higgle-Dy Piggle-Dy" (2006)
January 2005 – May 2006	Dougie James – vocals (October 2005/May 2006, guest)	none – three live performances only
May – September 2006	Mark E. Smith – lead vocals; Tim Presley – guitar; Rob Barbato – bass; Elena Poulou – keyboards, backing vocals; Orpheo McCord – drums, backing vocals	none – live performances only
May – September 2006	Peter Greenway – guitar (26 and 27 August, substitute); Dave Spurr – bass (26 and 27 August, substitute)	none – live performances only
September 2006 – June 2007	Mark E. Smith – lead vocals; Tim Presley – guitar; Rob Barbato – bass; Dave Spurr – bass, backing vocals; Elena Poulou – keyboards, backing vocals; Orpheo McCord – drums, backing vocals	"Fall Sound" (2007)
September 2006 – June 2007	Peter Greenway – guitar (occasional guest/substitute)	Reformation Post TLC (2007); Last Night at The Palais (2009)
September 2006 – June 2007	Keiron Melling – drums (October/November, sub/guest)	none – two live performances only
June 2007 – November 2013	Mark E. Smith – lead vocals; Peter Greenway – guitar, backing vocals; Dave Spurr – bass, backing vocals; Elena Poulou – keyboards, backing vocals; Keiron Melling – drums, percussion	Imperial Wax Solvent (2008); "Bury!" (2010); Your Future Our Clutter (2010); Ersatz GB (2011); Live Uurop VIII–XII Places in Sun & Winter, Son (2014); Live in Clitheroe (2017); Another "Set of Ten" (2019) – five discs
June 2007 – November 2013	Tim Presley – guitar (session guest)	"Night of the Humerons" (2012); Re-Mit (2013)
June 2007 – November 2013	Simon Archer – bass (March 2008, guest)	none – live performances only
June 2007 – November 2013	Tim Presley – guitar (November 2011, substitute)	Another "Set of Ten" (2019) – one disc
June 2007 – November 2013	Rob Barbato – bass (16 and 17 August 2013, substitute)	Another "Set of Ten" (2019) – one disc
November 2013 – October 2015	Mark E. Smith – lead vocals; Peter Greenway – guitar, backing vocals; Dave Spurr – bass, backing vocals; Elena Poulou – keyboards, backing vocals; Keiron Melling – drums, percussion; Daren Garratt – drums, backing vocals	The Remainderer (2013); Sub-Lingual Tablet (2015); Wise Ol' Man (2016)
October 2015 – April 2016	Mark E. Smith – lead vocals; Peter Greenway – guitar, backing vocals; Dave Spurr – bass, backing vocals; Elena Poulou – keyboards, backing vocals; Keiron Melling – drums, percussion	none – live performances only
May 2016 – May 2017	Mark E. Smith – lead vocals, keyboards; Peter Greenway – guitar, synthesisers, backing vocals; Dave Spurr – bass, mellotron, backing vocals; Keiron Melling – drums, percussion	New Facts Emerge (2017)
May 2016 – May 2017	Paul Bonney – drums (July – January, guest)	none – live performances only
May 2017 – January 2018	Mark E. Smith – lead vocals; Peter Greenway – guitar, backing vocals; Dave Spurr – bass, backing vocals; Michael Clapham – keyboards; Keiron Melling – drums, percussion	none – live performances only
