= 50,000 Fall Fans Can't Be Wrong =

Greatest hits album by The Fall
- Released: 8 June 2004
- Recorded: 1977–2003
- Genres: Post-punk, alternative rock
- Length: 2:35:17
- Label: Sanctuary
- Compiler: Daryl Easlea

The Fall compilation album chronology
50,000 Fall Fans Can't Be Wrong (2004)	The Complete Peel Sessions 1978–2004 (2005)

The Fall chronology
The Real New Fall LP (Formerly Country on the Click) (2003)	50,000 Fall Fans Can't Be Wrong (2004)	The Complete Peel Sessions 1978–2004 (2005)

50,000 Fall Fans Can't Be Wrong (subtitled 39 Golden Greats) is a greatest hits album by English post-punk band the Fall, released in 2004 by record label Sanctuary.

== Content ==
50,000 is the group's first career-spanning compilation album, with a selection of songs from the 1978 EP Bingo-Master's Break-Out! up to the 2003 album The Real New Fall LP (Formerly Country on the Click). The selection of songs includes both singles and album highlights. Journalist and author, Daryl Easlea compiled the album and wrote the sleevenotes.

The cover and title of the album is a parody of Elvis Presley's 50,000,000 Elvis Fans Can't Be Wrong (1959).

In November 2018, the album was repackaged and expanded as 58 Golden Greats on Cherry Red Records. The new cover also referenced an Elvis Presley album, this time the UK edition of Elvis' 40 Greatest.

== Reception ==
Professional ratings
Review scores
Source	Rating
AllMusic	4.5/5 stars
Blender	4/5 stars
Pitchfork	9.3/10
The Rolling Stone Album Guide	4/5 stars
Stylus	A
Uncut	2/5 stars
The Village Voice	A

Critic Phil Freeman included the compilation on a list of records attempting to define "the state of music since 1979" in the 2007 book Marooned: The Next Generation of Desert Island Discs. Noting the Fall as "one of the most polarizing bands on the planet", Freeman wrote that the album "will either begin a lifelong obsession, or you'll never make it to track two." Comedian Frank Skinner became a Fall fan, "with all the zeal of a convert", after listening to the compilation in 2005, calling it "the music I've been searching for my whole life."

== Track listing ==
Disc one
No.	Title	Writer(s)	Length
1.	"Repetition" (from the Bingo-Master's Break-Out! EP)	Una Baines, Martin Bramah, Karl Burns, Tony Friel, Mark E. Smith	4:55
2.	"Industrial Estate" (from Live at the Witch Trials)	Friel, Bramah, Smith	1:41
3.	"Rowche Rumble" (1979 single)	Marc Riley, Smith, Craig Scanlon	4:00
4.	"Fiery Jack" (1980 single)	Steve Hanley, Riley, Scanlon, Smith	4:43
5.	"How I Wrote 'Elastic Man'" (1980 single)	Riley, Scanlon, S. Hanley, Smith	4:19
6.	"Totally Wired" (1980 single)	Riley, Smith, Scanlon	3:24
7.	"New Face in Hell" (from Grotesque)	Riley, Scanlon, Smith	5:39
8.	"Prole Art Threat" (from Slates)	Riley, Smith	1:56
9.	"Lie Dream of a Casino Soul" (1981 single)	Riley, Smith, Paul Hanley	3:07
10.	"The Classical" (from Hex Enduction Hour)	Smith, The Fall	5:16
11.	"Hip Priest" (from Hex Enduction Hour)	Riley, S. Hanley, P. Hanley, Scanlon, Smith	7:43
12.	"The Man Whose Head Expanded" (1983 single)	S. Hanley, Scanlon, Smith	4:24
13.	"Kicker Conspiracy" (1983 single)	Smith	4:17
14.	"Eat Y'Self Fitter" (from Perverted by Language)	S. Hanley, Smith	6:34
15.	"C.R.E.E.P." (1984 single)	Smith, Brix Smith, P. Hanley, S. Hanley	2:54
16.	"No Bulbs" (1984 single)	Smith, B. Smith	4:28
17.	"Spoilt Victorian Child" (from This Nation's Saving Grace)	Simon Rogers, Smith	4:11
18.	"Cruiser's Creek" (1985 single)	Smith, B. Smith, Scanlon	4:15

Disc two
No.	Title	Writer(s)	Length
1.	"U.S. 80's–90's" (from Bend Sinister)	Smith	4:33
2.	"Mr Pharmacist" (1986 single)	Jeff Nowlen	2:18
3.	"Living Too Late" (1986 single)	Smith	4:27
4.	"Hey! Luciani" (1986 single)	Smith, S. Hanley, Scanlon	3:34
5.	"There's a Ghost in My House" (1987 single)	Lamont Dozier, Brian Holland, Eddie Holland, R. Dean Taylor	2:36
6.	"Hit the North" (1987 single)	Rogers, Smith, B. Smith	3:59
7.	"Victoria" (1988 single)	Ray Davies	2:43
8.	"Telephone Thing" (1990 single)	Smith, Matt Black, Jonathan More	4:10
9.	"High Tension Line" (1990 single)	Smith, Scanlon, S. Hanley	3:45
10.	"Free Range" (1992 single)	Smith, Simon Wolstencroft	4:18
11.	"Why Are People Grudgeful?" (1993 single)	Lee Perry, Joel Gibson	4:27
12.	"Behind the Counter" (1993 single)	Burns, Smith	3:09
13.	"M5" (from Middle Class Revolt)	Dave Bush, Wolstencroft, Smith	3:31
14.	"Feeling Numb" (from Cerebral Caustic)	Smith, B. Smith	2:44
15.	"The Chiselers" (1996 single)	Smith, Wolstencroft, Burns, S. Hanley, Julia Nagle	3:13
16.	"Powder Keg" (from The Light User Syndrome)	Smith, Burns	3:16
17.	"Masquerade" (1998 single)	Smith, Nagle	3:50
18.	"Touch Sensitive" (1999 single)	Smith, Nagle	3:15
19.	"Crop-Dust" (from Are You Are Missing Winner)	Spencer Birtwhistle, Smith	5:30
20.	"Susan vs Youthclub" (from "The Fall vs 2003" single)	Dave Milner, Smith	3:36
21.	"Green Eyed Loco-Man" (from The Real New Fall LP (Formerly Country on the Click))	Smith, Jim Watts	3:46

=== 58 Golden Greats track listing ===
The expanded and repackaged version, released in 2018, omitted two tracks from 50,000 Fall Fans Can't Be Wrong ("Crop-Dust" and "Green Eyed Loco-Man") but added 21 tracks, mostly from the period after the release of the earlier edition.

Disc one
No.	Title	Writer(s)	Length
1.	"Repetition"		4:56
2.	"Rebellious Jukebox" (from Live at the Witch Trials)	Smith, Bramah	2:51
3.	"Industrial Estate"		1:41
4.	"Rowche Rumble"		4:01
5.	"Fiery Jack"		4:45
6.	"How I Wrote 'Elastic Man'"		4:20
7.	"Totally Wired"		3:25
8.	"New Face in Hell"		5:41
9.	"Prole Art Threat"		1:57
10.	"Lie Dream of a Casino Soul"		3:07
11.	"The Classical"		5:16
12.	"Hip Priest"		7:45
13.	"Joker Hysterical Face" (from Room To Live)	Smith, S. Hanley, Riley	4:48
14.	"The Man Whose Head Expanded"		4:25
15.	"Kicker Conspiracy"		4:18
16.	"Eat Y'Self Fitter"		6:35
17.	"Oh! Brother" (1984 single)	Smith, Burns, S. Hanley, Scanlon	4:00
18.	"C.R.E.E.P."		2:56

Disc two
No.	Title	Writer(s)	Length
1.	"No Bulbs"		4:28
2.	"Cruiser's Creek"		4:15
3.	"Spoilt Victorian Child"		4:12
4.	"U.S. 80's–90's"		4:33
5.	"Mr Pharmacist"		2:19
6.	"Living Too Late"		4:27
7.	"Hey! Luciani"		3:34
8.	"There's a Ghost in My House"		2:36
9.	"Hit the North"		3:59
10.	"Carry Bag Man" (from The Frenz Experiment)	Smith	4:00
11.	"Victoria"		2:43
12.	"Big New Prinz" (1988 single)	Smith, Scanlon, S. Hanley, Schofield	3:22
13.	"Dead Beat Descendent" (1989 single)	Smith, B. Smith	2:25
14.	"Telephone Thing"		4:10
15.	"High Tension Line"		3:46
16.	"Free Range"		4:20
17.	"Why Are People Grudgeful?"		4:27
18.	"Lost In Music" (from The Infotainment Scan)	Rogers, Edwards	3:50
19.	"Behind the Counter"		3:10
20.	"M5"		3:33
21.	"Feeling Numb"		2:46

Disc three
No.	Title	Writer(s)	Length
1.	"The Chiselers"		3:13
2.	"Powder Keg"		3:17
3.	"Masquerade"		3:50
4.	"Touch Sensitive"		3:15
5.	"Dr Buck's Letter" (from The Unutterable)	Smith, Nagle, Head, Helal, Wilding	5:19
6.	"Hollow Mind" (from Are You Are Missing Winner)	Smith, Blaney	3:22
7.	"Susan vs Youthclub"		3:37
8.	"Mountain Energei" (from The Real New Fall LP (Formerly Country on the Click))	Smith, Milner	3:22
9.	"Theme From Sparta FC #2" (2004 single)	Smith, Watts, Pritchard	3:51
10.	"Blindness" (from Fall Heads Roll)	Smith, Birtwistle	7:23
11.	"Reformation (Uncut)" (from Reformation Post TLC)	Smith, Barbato	7:25
12.	"Wolf Kidult Man" (from Imperial Wax Solvent)	Smith, Spurr, Poulou	3:02
13.	"Bury!" (2010 single)	Smith, Spurr	3:45
14.	"Greenway" (from Ersatz GB)	Ioakimoglou, Smith	4:13
15.	"Sir William Wray" (from Re-Mit)	Smith, Poulou	3:33
16.	"The Remainderer" (from The Remainderer EP)	Smith	4:06
17.	"Venice With the Girls" (from Sub-Lingual Tablet)	Smith, Spurr, Melling	4:11
18.	"Wise Ol' Man" (from Wise Ol' Man EP)	Smith, Poulou, Spurr	3:17
19.	"New Facts Emerge" (from New Facts Emerge)	Smith, Spurr	4:03

== See also ==
- List of compilation albums by The Fall

== Sources ==
- Freeman, Phil (2007). "Return to Treasure Island". Marooned: The Next Generation of Desert Island Discs. Philadelphia: Da Capo Press. pp. 281–321. ISBN 978-0-306-81485-3 – via the Internet Archive.
- Gross, Joe (2004). "The Fall". In Brackett, Nathan; Hoard, Christian (eds.). The New Rolling Stone Album Guide (4th ed.). Simon & Schuster. pp. 292–295. ISBN 0-7432-0169-8 – via the Internet Archive.
- Skinner, Frank (2008). Frank Skinner on the Road. London: Random House. ISBN 978-1-84413-190-7 – via the Internet Archive.
