= Touch Sensitive... Bootleg Box Set =

Touch Sensitive...

Live album box set by The Fall
- Released: 2003
- Recorded: USA, Netherlands, England
- Genre: Rock
- Length: 5:20:45
- Label: Sanctuary
- Producer: none

The Fall chronology
| 2G+2 (2002) | Touch Sensitive... (2003) | The Real New Fall LP (Formerly Country on the Click) (2003) |

Professional ratings
Review scores
| Source | Rating |
|---|---|
| AllMusic | 2/5 stars |

Touch Sensitive... Bootleg Box Set is a five-disc live box set by the Fall, released in 2003. Each disc features a full live set from either April or November 2001, making it the most comprehensive live document of any era of the Fall's long career thus far. The discs are not arranged chronologically. Due to the brief timespan, there is considerable repetition — the bulk of the material is drawn from 2000's The Unutterable and 2001's Are You Are Missing Winner. As the use of the word bootleg implies, the sound quality varies but it is generally superior. A handful of tracks from the first two discs also feature on the 2G+2 album.

== Track listing ==
- Disc one
1. "Cyber Insekt"
2. "Two Librans"
3. "And Therein..."
4. "Touch Sensitive"
5. "Crop-Dust"
6. "Bourgeois Town"
7. "Sons Of Temperance"
8. "Mr Pharmacist"
9. "Kick The Can" / "F-Oldin' Money"
10. "My Ex-Classmates' Kids"
11. "Enigrammatic Dream"
12. "I Wake Up In The City"
13. "Way Round"
14. "I Am Damo Suzuki"

Recorded at The Knitting Factory, New York City, 23 November 2001

- Disc two
1. "The Joke"
2. "Cyber Insek"
3. "Two Librans"
4. "And Therein..."
5. "Touch Sensitive"
6. "Crop-Dust"
7. "Bourgeois Town"
8. "Sons Of Temperance"
9. "Mr Pharmacist"
10. "Kick The Can" / "F-Oldin' Money"
11. "My Ex-Classmates' Kids"
12. "Enigrammatic Dream"
13. "I Wake Up In The City"
14. "Ey Bastardo"
15. "Way Round"
16. "I Am Damo Suzuki"

Recorded at The Crocodile cafe, Seattle, 20 November 2001

- Disc three
1. "MES (intro)" - this is an excerpt from MES's solo album The Post Nearly Man
2. "Sons Of Temperance"
3. "Two Librans"
4. "Touch Sensitive"
5. "Antidotes"
6. "F-Oldin' Money"
7. "Hot Runes"
8. "Way Round"
9. "Ketamine Sun"
10. "Instrumental"
11. "Midwatch 1953"
12. "Mr Pharmacist"
13. "Dr Buck's Letter"
14. "He Pep! (instrumental)"
15. "Das Katerer"
16. "Cyber Insekt"
17. "Ibis-Afro Man"
18. "Birthday Song (instrumental)"
19. "Paintwork"

Recorded at Patronaat, Haarlem, 6 April 2001

- Disc four
1. "MES (spoken word tape)" - as per disc 3
2. "Sons Of Temperance"
3. "Two Librans"
4. "Touch Sensitive"
5. "Antidotes"
6. "F-Oldin' Money"
7. "Ketamine Sun"
8. "Way Round"
9. "Midwatch 1953"
10. "Mr Pharmacist"
11. "Cyber Insekt"
12. "Ibis-Afro Man"
13. "Serum (instrumental)"
14. "Dr Buck's Letter"
15. "Hot Runes"
16. "Birthday Song (instrumental)"

Recorded at Melkweg, Amsterdam, 7 April 2001

- Disc five
1. "The Joke"
2. "Two Librans"
3. "F-Oldin' Money"
4. "Cyber Insekt"
5. "Dr Buck's Letter"
6. "Mr Pharmacist"
7. "I Am Damo Suzuki"
8. "Touch Sensitive"
9. "Ketamine Sun"
10. "Way Round"
11. "Antidotes"
12. "Hot Runes"
13. "Ibis-Afro Man"
14. "Paintwork"
15. "And Therein..."

Recorded at Concorde 2, Brighton, 17 April 2001

== Personnel ==
- Mark E. Smith - vocals
- Ben Pritchard - guitar
- Jim Watts - bass guitar
- Spencer Birtwistle - drums
- Julia Nagle - keyboards, guitar (discs 3-5 only)
- Ed Blaney - vocals (occasional, only features on a few tracks)
