= Touch Sensitive =

Touch Sensitive may refer to:

- Touch Sensitive (album), a 1984 album by Bruce Foxton
- Touch Sensitive... Bootleg Box Set, five disc live box set by The Fall
- Touch Sensitive, an album by Mackey Feary 1984
- Touch Sensitive (producer), a solo project of Michael Di Francesco

== See also ==
- Touch sensitivity or mechanoreception
