= Liverpool 78 =

Live album by The Fall
- Released: 4 June 2001
- Recorded: Mr Pickwick's, Liverpool August 22, 1978
- Genre: Post-punk
- Length: 49:32
- Label: Cog Sinister

The Fall chronology
| The Unutterable (2000) | Liverpool 78 (2001) | Are You Are Missing Winner (2001) |

Professional ratings
Review scores
| Source | Rating |
|---|---|
| AllMusic | 3.5/5 stars |
| The Encyclopedia of Popular Music | 1/5 stars |

Liverpool 78 is a live album by the Fall, based on a bootleg cassette of their performance at Mr Pickwick's in Liverpool on 22 August 1978, and released in this specific form on 4 June 2001.

AllMusic considered the recording to have historic interest but judged the sound quality very poor.

The tracks featured have subsequently been reissued as part of an expanded Live at the Witch Trials.

== Track listing ==
1. "Like to Blow" (Martin Bramah, Mark E. Smith) – 2:05
2. "Stepping Out" (Smith, Tony Friel) – 3:09
3. "Two Steps Back" (Bramah, Smith) – 5:51
4. "Mess of My" (Bramah, Smith, Goldstraw) – 3:24
5. "It's the New Thing" (Bramah) – 3:48
6. "Various Times" (Karl Burns, Smith, Bramah, Yvonne Pawlett, Marc Riley) – 4:59
7. "Bingo-Master's Break-Out!" (Una Baines, Smith) – 2:48
8. "Frightened" (Smith, Friel) – 5:35
9. "Industrial Estate" (Friel, Bramah, Smith) – 1:53
10. "Psycho Mafia" (Friel, Smith) – 3:01
11. "Music Scene" (Bramah, Pawlett, Smith, Riley) – 9:26
12. "Mother-Sister!" (Smith, Baines) – 3:31

== Personnel ==
- Mark E. Smith - vocals
- Martin Bramah - guitar, backing vocals
- Marc Riley - bass guitar
- Yvonne Pawlett - keyboards
- Karl Burns - drums
