= Factory Star =

English post-punk group

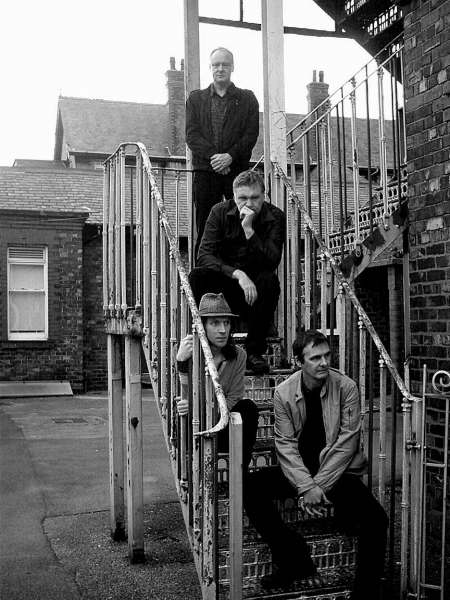
- Factory Star 2009.

Background information
- Origin: Manchester, England
- Genres: Alternative rock
- Years active: 2008–present
- Members: Martin Bramah; Hop Man JR; Chris Dutton; Joe Mckechnie

Factory Star are an English post-punk group, formed in Manchester in December 2008. The group was formed by singer/songwriter/guitarist Martin Bramah. Factory Star began life as Bramah, Tim Lyons (bass) and Brian Benson (drums). In April 2009 they were replaced by Steve Hanley (bass), Paul Hanley (drums), and John Paul Moran (a.k.a. Hop Man Jr) of Gnod & Rapid Pig (Keys). Bramah had two stints in The Fall - 1976 to '79 and '89 to '90 - and fronted several incarnations of Blue Orchids from 1979 - 2005. The Hanley brothers were also previously members of The Fall - Steve from 1979 to '98 and Paul from 1980 to '85. They got in touch with Bramah through Dave Simpson, thanks to Simpson's book The Fallen. The band performed in Anglesey on New Year's Eve in 2008, playing tracks from Bramah's solo album The Battle of Twisted Heel. Their first single "Lucybel" was made available on iTunes in 2009. The band performed a live session and were interviewed by Marc Riley on his BBC 6 Music show in July 2009.

The Hanley brothers parted company with the band in April 2010, and were replaced by Chris Dutton on bass (Sicknurse, The Hamsters, Kill Pretty) and Tom Lewis on drums (Rapid Pig).

In January 2011 the band was taken on board by Occultation Records and entered Parr Street studios in Liverpool to record what was supposed to be a single. Due to the band being so well rehearsed they managed to record an album in the allotted time. The resulting album was named "Enter Castle Perilous" and was released on CD, LP and download in March 2011. In November 2011, the Christmas single "Lucybel" was released on CD and 7", coming from the same Parr St sessions.

Following Tom Lewis' departure, Joe McKechnie (ex-The Passage) joined on drums in January 2012. Following gigs in Manchester, Brighton and London, this lineup recorded 6 songs in Liverpool. The resultant mini-album is expected in July 2012.
