= Interim (album) =

Compilation album by The Fall
- Released: 1 November 2004
- Recorded: 2004 at Tuff Gong Rehearsal Studios, Warrington; Fibber's, York; BBC Maida Vale Studio 4, London, England
- Genre: Post-punk
- Length: 42:48
- Label: Hip Priest, Voiceprint
- Producer: Mark E. Smith

The Fall chronology
50,000 Fall Fans Can't Be Wrong (2004)	Interim (2004)	The Complete Peel Sessions 1978–2004 (2005)

Professional ratings
Review scores
Source	Rating
AllMusic	2/5 stars
Pitchfork	5.8/10

Interim is an album by English post-punk band The Fall, compiled from live and studio material and released in 2004 by record label Hip Priest.

== Content ==
Interim features the first officially released versions of "Clasp Hands", "Blindness" and "What About Us?" – all of which were later included on the band's next studio album Fall Heads Roll (2005) – as well as the instrumental "I'm Ronnie the Oney". The remaining tracks are all new versions of previously released songs, mostly from studio rehearsal recordings.

Interim was originally to be titled Cocked - the alternate title was given on a promotional CD for "Blindness", which also gave the track's title as "Blind Man".

== Track listing ==
No.	Title	Length
1.	"All Clasp Hands" (recorded live July 12, 2004 at Fibber's, York)	3:32
2.	"Blindness" (alternate mix of "Blind Man" demo, which was released separately as a promotional CD)	3:26
3.	"What About Us?" (unknown live or rehearsal recording; segues into excerpt of Peel Session version recorded August 4, 2004 at Maida Vale Studio 4, London)	6:29
4.	"I'm Ronnie the Oney" (demo or rehearsal)	1:33
5.	"Green-Eyed Snorkel" (recorded live July 12, 2004 at Fibber's, York; includes excerpt of Jim Watts' demo version, then titled "Iodeo")	6:49
6.	"Mod Mock Goth" (rehearsal with additional vocal overdub)	2:50
7.	"Wrong Place" (rehearsal)	2:40
8.	"Sparta FC No. 3" (rehearsal)	4:31
9.	"Mere Pseud Mag Ed" (rehearsal)	3:22
10.	"Spoilt Victorian Childe" (rehearsal)	5:06
11.	"Boxoctosis Alarum" (rehearsal)	3:17

== Personnel ==
- Mark E. Smith – vocals, guitar on "Mere Pseud Mag Ed"
- Ben Pritchard – guitar
- Jim Watts – guitar
- Steve Trafford – bass guitar
- Spencer Birtwistle – drums
- Elena Poulou – keyboards, vocals
- Ed Blaney – guitar, vocals
