= New Facts Emerge =

Studio album by the Fall
- Released: 28 July 2017
- Recorded: 2016–2017
- Genre: Alternative rock
- Length: 47:14
- Label: Cherry Red
- Producers: Keiron Melling, Mark E. Smith

The Fall chronology
Wise Ol' Man (2016)	New Facts Emerge (2017)

New Facts Emerge is the 31st and final studio album by English band the Fall, released on 28 July 2017 by Cherry Red Records.

This is the first album since Are You Are Missing Winner (2001) not to feature keyboardist Elena Poulou, who quit the Fall the previous year after separating from frontman Mark E. Smith. Her departure reduced the band to a quartet for the first time since the early 1990s. Smith died in January 2018, making New Facts Emerge the band's final album.

The title of the song "Victoria Train Station Massacre" caused controversy, as the album announcement came just a week after the Ariana Grande concert bombing, which occurred in a foyer connecting Manchester Arena to Manchester Victoria railway station. A representative for the band confirmed that the track's title was an unfortunate coincidence, and the artwork was sent off for manufacture "long before the terrible events in Manchester".

Professional ratings
Aggregate scores
Source	Rating
Metacritic	71/100
Review scores
Source	Rating
AllMusic	3.5/5 stars
Drowned in Sound	(8/10)
The Guardian	3/5 stars
Mojo	4/5 stars
Pitchfork	(6.8/10)
The Quietus	(9/10)

== Track listing ==
No.	Title	Writer(s)	Length
1.	"Segue"	Mark E. Smith	0:30
2.	"Fol de Rol"	Dave Spurr, Keiron Melling, Smith	6:35
3.	"Brillo de Facto"	Spurr, Melling, Smith, Pete Greenway	3:49
4.	"Victoria Train Station Massacre"	Spurr, Smith	1:14
5.	"New Facts Emerge"	Spurr, Smith	4:02
6.	"Couples vs Jobless Mid 30s"	Spurr, Melling, Smith	8:44
7.	"Second House Now"	Spurr, Smith, Greenway	4:28
8.	"O! ZZTRRK Man"	Melling, Smith	3:50
9.	"Gibbus Gibson"	Spurr, Smith, Greenway	2:37
10.	"Groundsboy"	Spurr, Smith, Greenway	3:38
11.	"Nine Out of Ten"	Smith	8:48

== Personnel ==
The Fall

- Mark E. Smith – vocals, production
- Peter Greenway – guitar, synth, backing vocals
- David Spurr – bass guitar, Mellotron, backing vocals
- Keiron Melling – drums, production

Additional personnel

- Pamela Vander – percussion and backing vocals on "Groundsboy", artwork
- Christophe Bride – French voice on "New Facts Emerge"
- Mat Arnold – engineering
- Simon "Ding" Archer – engineering
- Andy Pearce – mastering
- Matt Wortham – assistant mastering

== Charts ==
Chart (2017)	Peak position
Scottish Albums (Official Charts)	15
UK Albums (Official Charts)	35
