= Are You Are Missing Winner =

Studio album by the Fall
- Released: 5 November 2001
- Recorded: August 2001
- Studios: Noise Box, Manchester
- Genre: Alternative rock
- Length: 47:47
- Label: Cog Sinister / Voiceprint
- Producers: Mark E. Smith; Jim Watts; Spencer Birtwistle; Ed Blaney

The Fall chronology
Liverpool 78 (2001)	Are You Are Missing Winner (2001)	2G+2 (2002)

Are You Are Missing Winner is the twenty-second album by English post-punk band the Fall, released in November 2001 on CD and in January 2002 as a vinyl picture disc.

== Background and recording ==
Since the previous year's release of the critically acclaimed The Unutterable, Fall front man Mark E. Smith had replaced his entire band with a new line-up, a fact he acknowledges in a refrain in the album's opening track: "Not like the old one/We are the new Fall".

The group was short of money at the time, so the album was recorded very quickly in a cheap studio. Guitarist Ben Pritchard described the making of the album as a "very miserable experience [...] There were rats running around. There was a weightlifter's gymnasium above us, you'd be recording a take and suddenly you'd hear BOOM dropping barbells and dumb-bells on the floor and you'd have to stop and start again".

The Unutterable's flirtation with drum and bass is replaced with a rockabilly-influenced sound and limited use of electronic keyboards. The album features a cover version of the northern soul track "Gotta See Jane", originally by R. Dean Taylor (The Fall had previously achieved a minor hit in 1987 with a version of Taylor's "There's a Ghost in My House"). Also featured are versions of Lead Belly's "The Bourgeois Blues", as "Bourgeois Town", and of Iggy Pop's "African Man", as "Ibis-Afro Man", the latter being particularly experimental with different recordings of the track frequently playing simultaneously throughout.

"Kick the Can" takes its title from an episode of The Twilight Zone.

The album's release was so rushed that the tracks weren't even mastered properly, resulting in wildly uneven audio levels and quality. It was remastered in 2006 for a Castle Communications reissue.

== Reception ==
Professional ratings
Review scores
Source	Rating
AllMusic	2.5/5 stars
BBC Music	favourable
The Birmingham Post	1/5 stars
Q	2/5 stars
The Times	2/3
The Wire	favourable

Critical reception to Are You Are Missing Winner was mixed, often focusing unfavourably on the contrast with The Unutterable. Among the album's more negative reviews were that of John Bush of AllMusic, who suggests, "Are You Are Missing Winner represents a rare misstep for the mighty Fall", and Andrew Cowen for The Birmingham Post, who called it "appallingly recorded throwaway kids stuff", and "scrappy even by their standards", going on to write "Mark E Smith sounds paralytic throughout, mumbling and ranting like some sorry old man. You can almost smell the wee."

Edwin Pouncey, writing in The Wire, is more upbeat: "…Smith scatterguns half remembered lyrics and conducts a whirlpool of splintered guitar, dishevelled drum and battered bass sounds with a Quasimodic Gene Vincent leather gloved fist that claws even deeper into the raw clay of innovation that birthed rock 'n' roll and continues to fuel Smith's unique vision".

== Track listing ==
No.	Title	Writer(s)	Length
1.	"Jim's "The Fall""	Mark E. Smith, Jim Watts	2:39
2.	"Bourgeois Town"	Huddie Ledbetter; arr. Smith (Note: Credited incorrectly to Robert Johnson in album liner notes on 2001 edition.)	3:41
3.	"Crop-Dust"	Smith, Spencer Birtwistle (Note: Based on a sample of "I Just Sing" by The Troggs, though uncredited.)	5:31
4.	"My Ex-Classmates' Kids"	Smith, Ed Blaney	4:51
5.	"Kick the Can"	Smith, Ben Pritchard	5:13
6.	"Gotta See Jane"	R. Dean Taylor	2:23
7.	"Ibis-Afro Man"	Smith, Watts, Iggy Pop, Scott Thurston (Note: Adapted from "African Man" from the Iggy Pop album New Values (1979).)	9:32
8.	"The Acute"	Smith, Brian Fanning	3:19
9.	"Hollow Mind"	Smith, Blaney	3:32
10.	"Reprise: Jane – Prof Mick – Ey Bastardo"	Birtwistle, Blaney	7:00
Total length:			47:47

- Some CD copies have tracks 4 and 5 in the reverse order, despite the order being listed as above.

=== 2006 edition ===
The album was remastered and expanded by Castle Music in 2006. The sound quality is less erratic than on the original edition, and 6 extra tracks are added as follows:

No.	Title	Writer(s)	Length
11.	"Rude (All the Time)"	Smith, Blaney	2:44
12.	"I Wake Up in the City"	Smith, Blaney	4:40
13.	"New Formation Sermon"	Smith	2:04
14.	"Distilled Mug Art"	Smith, Blaney	3:33
15.	"My Ex-Classmates' Kids" (live in Cologne 23 October 2001)	Smith, Blaney	4:59
16.	"Where's the Fuckin' Taxi? Cunt"	Smith, Blaney, Fanning, Les Fisher	5:09
Total length:			71:02

Notes

- "Rude (All the Time)" and "I Wake Up in the City" were previously issued on a 7" single by Flitwick Records in an edition of 500, all of which were given away to subscribers free of charge. "I Wake Up in the City", "New Formation Sermon" and "Distilled Mug Art" were included on 2G+2. The live "My Ex-Classmates' Kids" was included on the single release of "Theme from Sparta F.C.#2". The final track was taken from the controversial "Rude (All the Time)" EP issued by Voiceprint in 2005 and is little more than a recorded discussion amongst the credited personnel.

== Personnel ==
The Fall

- Mark E. Smith – vocals, production
- Jim Watts – bass guitar, guitar, vocals, production
- Ben Pritchard – guitar, vocals
- Spencer Birtwistle – drums, production

Additional personnel

- Ed Blaney – guitar, vocals, production
- Brian Fanning – guitar, vocals; bass on "Ey Bastardo"
- Julia Nagle – keyboards on "Ibis-Afro Man" - uncredited; a section of this track is taken from a live recording from 23 April 2001 at the Mean Fiddler in London. Nagle was still in the band at this point and is clearly heard on the track.
- Steve Lloyd – engineering
- Steve Lee – cover artwork
