= Bend Sinister (album) =

Studio album by the Fall
- Released: 29 September 1986
- Recorded: April–July 1986
- Studios: Abbey Road Studios, London; Square One, Bury; Yellow 2, Stockport
- Genre: Post-punk
- Length: 43:12
- Label: Beggars Banquet
- Producer: John Leckie

The Fall chronology
| This Nation's Saving Grace (1985) | Bend Sinister (1986) | The Frenz Experiment (1988) |

Singles from Bend Sinister
- 1. "Mr. Pharmacist" Released: 1 September 1986

Bend Sinister is the ninth studio album by the English post-punk band the Fall. It was released in September 1986 by record label Beggars Banquet.

== Recording and production ==
Bend Sinister was the third and last Fall album to be produced by John Leckie. When recording began, the band was without a drummer, as Karl Burns was fired shortly before sessions began. Ex-member Paul Hanley stepped and recorded several songs before permanent replacement Simon Wolstencroft was found. However, Leckie and Mark E. Smith argued during the recording, with Smith complaining that "he'd always swamp everything, y'know, put the psychedelic sounds over it". Leckie, for his part, drew the line at Smith's insistence that some tracks be mastered from a standard audio cassette that Smith had been carrying around and listening to on a Walkman.

"Mark was stomping around saying 'That's not the mixes we had in the studio,' but he'd been listening to a chrome Dolby cassette he'd taken away and played on this little Walkman through a speaker that was distorting, and that was his reference. In the end, a lot of that album was cut from a cassette because that's the quality that Mark wanted. He was actually right, though, because that's their sound", Leckie told Melody Maker in 1995.

Julia Adamson, who engineered some of the recording sessions, would eventually join the Fall in 1995 as a keyboard/guitar player.

== Content ==
The album's title, a heraldic term, is taken from Vladimir Nabokov's 1947 novel of the same name.

== Release ==
Bend Sinister was released in June 1986 by Beggars Banquet. It reached number 36 in the UK charts. It also became the first Fall album to be released on CD, with the addition of single "Living Too Late" and B-side "Auto-Tech Pilot".

The record was released in the US and Australia in 1987 on Big Time Records re-titled as The Domesday Pay-Off Triad -Plus! with a different cover art, and replacing several tracks with songs from non-album singles "Hey! Luciani" (released on 8 December 1986) and "There's a Ghost in My House" (released on 27 April 1987).

The album was reissued by Beggars Arkive in March 2019. The new 2CD/2LP edition, titled Bend Sinister / The Domesday Pay-Off Triad-Plus!, was newly transferred and remastered from original analogue tapes, and features original album on disc 1 and non-album tracks from the contemporary singles on disc 2; in addition, the CD version contains the 1986 Peel session and several previously unreleased alternate mixes.

== Critical reception ==
Professional ratings
Review scores
| Source | Rating |
|---|---|
| AllMusic | 3.5/5 stars |

Bend Sinister was ranked number 7 among the "Albums of the Year" for 1986 by NME. In his retrospective review, Ned Raggett of AllMusic described it as a "distinctly down affair", while Trouser Press called it "a rather gloomy, dark-sounding record". Al Spicer, in The Rough Guide to Rock, called the album "not a great album by Fall standards".

Neither Smith nor Leckie spoke highly of the album in later years. Nonetheless, the record contains the group's version of "Mr. Pharmacist", originally by US garage rock band the Other Half, which gave the Fall their first UK Top 75 entry and remained a regular feature of the group's live set.

== Track listing ==
=== Vinyl LP ===
Side One
| No. | Title | Writer(s) | Length |
|---|---|---|---|
| 1. | "R.O.D." | Mark E. Smith, Brix Smith, Craig Scanlon, Simon Rogers, Simon Wolstencroft | 4:31 |
| 2. | "Dktr. Faustus" | M. Smith, Scanlon | 5:32 |
| 3. | "Shoulder Pads 1#" | M. Smith, B. Smith | 2:54 |
| 4. | "Mr Pharmacist" | Jeff Nowlen | 2:17 |
| 5. | "Gross Chapel – British Grenadiers" | M. Smith, Scanlon, Steve Hanley | 7:20 |
| Total length: | | | 22:34 |

Side Two
| No. | Title | Writer(s) | Length |
|---|---|---|---|
| 1. | "US 80's–90's" | M. Smith, B. Smith | 4:34 |
| 2. | "Terry Waite Sez" | M. Smith, B. Smith | 1:37 |
| 3. | "Bournemouth Runner" | M. Smith, B. Smith, Hanley | 6:05 |
| 4. | "Riddler!" | M. Smith, B. Smith, Rogers | 6:22 |
| 5. | "Shoulder Pads 2#" | M. Smith, B. Smith | 1:56 |
| Total length: | | | 20:31 |

=== CD/cassette ===
| No. | Title | Writer(s) | Length |
|---|---|---|---|
| 1. | "R.O.D." | M. Smith, B. Smith, Scanlon, Rogers, Wolstencroft | 4:31 |
| 2. | "Dktr. Faustus" | M. Smith, Scanlon | 5:32 |
| 3. | "Shoulder Pads 1#" | M. Smith, B. Smith | 2:54 |
| 4. | "Mr Pharmacist" | Nowlen | 2:17 |
| 5. | "Gross Chapel – British Grenadiers" | M. Smith, Scanlon, Hanley | 7:20 |
| 6. | "Living Too Late" | M. Smith | 4:35 |
| 7. | "US 80's–90's" | M. Smith, B. Smith | 4:34 |
| 8. | "Terry Waite Sez" | M. Smith, B. Smith | 1:37 |
| 9. | "Bournemouth Runner" | M. Smith, B. Smith, Hanley | 6:05 |
| 10. | "Riddler!" | M. Smith, B. Smith, Rogers | 6:22 |
| 11. | "Shoulder Pads 2#" | M. Smith, B. Smith | 1:56 |
| 12. | "Auto-Tech Pilot" | M. Smith, Hanley | 4:51 |
| 13. | "Town and Country Hobgoblins" (live recording of "City Hobgoblins", cassette only) | M. Smith, Scanlon, Hanley, Marc Riley | 3:00 |
| Total length: | | | 52:31 |

=== The Domesday Pay-Off Triad-Plus! ===
| No. | Title | Writer(s) | Length |
|---|---|---|---|
| 1. | "There's a Ghost in My House" | Brian Holland, Lamont Dozier, Eddie Holland, R. Dean Taylor | 2:36 |
| 2. | "US 80's–90's" | M. Smith, B. Smith | 4:34 |
| 3. | "Shoulder Pads 1#" | M. Smith, B. Smith | 2:54 |
| 4. | "Mr Pharmacist" | Nowlen | 2:17 |
| 5. | "Riddler!" | M. Smith, B. Smith, Rogers | 6:22 |
| 6. | "Hey! Luciani" | M. Smith, B. Smith, Hanley | 3:34 |
| 7. | "Haf Found Bormann" | M. Smith | 2:43 |
| 8. | "Terry Waite Sez" | M. Smith, B. Smith | 1:37 |
| 9. | "R.O.D." | M. Smith, B. Smith, Scanlon, Rogers, Wolstencroft | 4:31 |
| 10. | "Shoulder Pads 2#" | M. Smith, B. Smith | 1:56 |
| 11. | "Gross Chapel – British Grenadiers" | M. Smith, Scanlon, Hanley | 7:20 |

=== 2019 reissue ===
==== Disc 1 (Bend Sinister) ====
- As per original 1986 LP

==== Disc 2 (The Domesday Pay-Off Triad-Plus!) ====
| No. | Title | Writer(s) | Length |
|---|---|---|---|
| 1. | "Living Too Late" (single A-side, 1986) | M. Smith | 4:35 |
| 2. | "Hot Aftershave Bop" ("Living Too Late" single B-side) | M. Smith, Hanley | 3:45 |
| 3. | "Lucifer Over Lancashire" ("Mr. Pharmacist" single B-side, 1986) | M. Smith, Hanley | 5:11 |
| 4. | "Auto Tech Pilot" ("Mr. Pharmacist" single B-side) | M. Smith, Hanley | 4:53 |
| 5. | "Hey! Luciani" (single A-side, 1986) | M. Smith, B. Smith, Scanlon, Hanley | 3:35 |
| 6. | "Entitled" ("Hey! Luciani" single B-side) | M. Smith, Scanlon, Hanley | 3:15 |
| 7. | "Shouder Pads #1B" ("Hey! Luciani" single B-side) | M. Smith, B. Smith | 5:04 |
| 8. | "Living Too Long" ("Living Too Late" single B-side) | M. Smith, Scanlon, Rogers, Hanley | 7:09 |
| 9. | "R.O.D." (Peel Session, 29 June 1986) | M. Smith, B. Smith, Scanlon, Rogers, Wolstencroft | 4:27 |
| 10. | "Gross Chapel - GB Grenadiers" (Peel Session, 29 June 1986) | M. Smith, Scanlon, Hanley | 6:21 |
| 11. | "U.S. 80's-90's" (Peel Session, 29 June 1986) | M. Smith, B. Smith | 4:54 |
| 12. | "Hot Aftershave Bop" (Peel Session, 29 June 1986) | M. Smith, Hanley | 3:11 |
| 13. | "Luciani" (original version) | M. Smith, B. Smith, Scanlon, Hanley | 3:58 |
| 14. | "Dktr. Faustus" (rough mix) | M. Smith, Scanlon | 5:37 |
| 15. | "Terry Waite Sez" (Yellow 2 mix) | M. Smith, B. Smith | 1:45 |
| 16. | "Lucifer Over Lancashire" (Abbey Road - take 2) | M. Smith, Hanley | 4:41 |
| 17. | "Entitled" (Abbey Road - take 2) | M. Smith, Scanlon, Hanley | 2:56 |
| 18. | "Town and Country Hobgoblins" ("City Hobgoblins" live at the Town and Country Club, 12 July 1986) | M. Smith, Scanlon, Hanley, Riley | 2:32 |
| Total length: | | | 78:07 |

- Tracks 13–17 are previously unreleased. Tracks 9–18 only available on CD version.

== Personnel ==
The Fall

- Mark E. Smith – vocals, tapes, keyboards, guitar, violin
- Brix Smith – lead guitar, keyboards, vocals
- Steve Hanley – bass guitar, guitar
- Craig Scanlon – acoustic and electric guitar
- Simon Rogers – keyboards, machines, guitar
- Simon Wolstencroft (credited as 'John' S. Woolstencroft) – drums, percussion

Additional personnel

- Paul Hanley – drums and percussion on "Dktr Faustus", "Living Too Late", "Hot Aftershave Bop", "Living Too Long", and "Luciani" (original version); guitar on "Living Too Long"

Technical

- John Leckie – production
- Ian Broudie – production on "Hey! Luciani"
- Dale Griffin – production on Peel sessions
- The Fall – production on "Town and Country Hobgoblins"
- Tony Harris – engineering
- Joe Gillingham – engineering (uncredited)
- Julia Adamson – engineering (uncredited)
- Mike Engles – engineering on Peel sessions
- Mark E. Smith – sleeve design
- Steve Webbon – artwork
- Jeff Veitch – sleeve photography
- Kint B. – sleeve photography
- Larry Rodriguez – sleeve photography
- Lars Schwander – sleeve photography
- Steve Saporito – sleeve photography
