= Hey! Luciani =

Single by The Fall
- B-side: "Entitled"
- Released: December 1986
- Genre: Post-punk
- Label: Beggars Banquet
- Songwriters: Mark E. Smith, Brix Smith, Steve Hanley
- Producer: Ian Broudie

The Fall singles chronology
"Mr. Pharmacist" (1986)	"Hey! Luciani" (1986)	"There's a Ghost in My House" (1987)

"Hey! Luciani" is a song by British post-punk band the Fall, written by Mark E. Smith with his then-wife Brix Smith and longstanding band member Steve Hanley. Released in December 1986, the record reached number 59 on the UK singles chart, the band's first original song to make the top 75 of the chart. The song was written as part of Smith's play Hey! Luciani: The Life and Codex of John Paul I, concerning conspiracy theories about the 1978 death of the Pope (born Albino Luciani), which was performed for two weeks in London and starred Leigh Bowery.

== Recording ==
The song was performed on record by the band comprising Mark E Smith (vocals), Brix Smith (guitar, keyboards), Craig Scanlon (guitar), Steve Hanley (bass), Simon Rogers (bass, guitar, keyboards), and Simon Wolstencroft (drums). The record was produced by Ian Broudie. It was described by Ned Raggett at Allmusic as "initially strange in its bright warmth, but [it] turns out to be a perfect little pop winner while not compromising what was core about the group.... It might have seemed a long way from the Fall's beginnings, but it was still Smith's show all the way, even with Brix adding some sparkling backing vocals at the end."

"Hey! Luciani" was the second Fall record (and their first original song) to make the top 75 of the UK singles chart, following their version of The Other Half's "Mr. Pharmacist" earlier in 1986. The song was included on several Fall compilation albums including the 2004 album 50,000 Fall Fans Can't Be Wrong.
