= The Real New Fall LP (Formerly Country on the Click) =

Studio album by The Fall
- Released: 27 October 2003 (UK); 15 June 2004 (US)
- Recorded: December 2002 – January 2003
- Studios: Gracieland Studios, Rochdale
- Genre: Post-punk
- Length: 44:31 (UK); 52:25 (US)
- Labels: Action Records (UK); Narnack (US)
- Producers: Grant Showbiz; Mark E. Smith

The Fall chronology
2G+2 (2002)	The Real New Fall LP (Formerly Country on the Click) (2003)	50,000 Fall Fans Can't Be Wrong (2004)

Alternative cover
- Cover of the US version

The Real New Fall LP (Formerly Country on the Click) is the 23rd studio album by the Fall, released on Action Records in the United Kingdom in 2003, and then on Narnack Records in the United States, with a slightly altered track listing, in 2004.

== Background, recording, and release ==
The album was recorded at Lisa Stansfield's Gracieland Studios in Rochdale between December 2002 and January 2003 with producer Grant Showbiz.

The subtitle is explained by the fact that the tracks were originally scheduled for release in April 2003 under the title Country on the Click. Promotional copies were sent out and three of the new songs were previewed in the band's 23rd Peel Session, recorded on 19 February and broadcast on 13 March 2003. Smith was unhappy with the mix and decided it needed further work, stating in November 2003:

"The frustration is when people embellish what you're doing. I thought this LP was perfect round about March. But then you trust people—them who shall remain nameless—to go away and mix it and it comes back sounding like Dr. Who meets Posh Spice. You have to go back in and strip it down to what it basically was."

The early mix appeared on the internet, prompting the change of name when it was finally released, to differentiate it from the mix he was unhappy with. However, the original title still appears on the CD spine.

The album features the song "Theme from Sparta F.C.", which, from 2005, was used for several years as the theme music to the Final Score section of BBC television's Saturday afternoon sports coverage. In 2006, Smith was also invited to read out the classified football results on the BBCi interactive service "Score"; this performance was in turn released by the Sonic Arts Network on their Stewart Lee-compiled album The Topography of Chance. A version of the track was released as a single in the UK on 10 July 2004, charting at 66 in the UK Singles Chart; This version ("Theme from Sparta F.C. #2") also appears on the US versions of the album. Yet another version appeared on Interim.

A cover version of Lee Hazlewood's "Houston" is included on the album (as "Loop 41 'Houston").

== Reception ==
Professional ratings
Aggregate scores
Source	Rating
Metacritic	85/100
Review scores
Source	Rating
AllMusic	4/5 stars
Alternative Press	4/5
Blender	3/5 stars
The Guardian	4/5 stars
Mojo	4/5 stars
Pitchfork	7.9/10
Q	3/5 stars
Spin	A−
The Sunday Times	3/3
Uncut	5/5 stars

The Real New Fall LP was positively received, receiving an 85/100 score at Metacritic.com.

Alex Linhardt of Pitchfork called it "as valuable an album as anything The Fall ever released in the 1990s" and stated that "Smith's lyrics are at a near career-best of insolence and nonsense." AllMusic's David Jeffries wrote that the album "gives the faithful another reason to believe". Helen Pidd, reviewing the album for The Guardian, viewed Smith as being "on magnificently mad form". Andres Lokko, for Expressen, was also positive about the album, writing that Smith "grinds and spits on everything that moves. Sometimes it's completely incomprehensible, sometimes insanely entertaining". Uncut called it "Great by Smith’s standards. Practically genius by everybody else’s." Spin praised it as "an atavistic orgy of recycled riffs and lifelong obsessions". Mojo viewed it as "as good as anything in this group's monstrous catalogue". PopMatters called it "their best record in a decade".

== Track listing ==
=== UK version ===
No.	Title	Writer(s)	Length
1.	"Green Eyed Loco-Man"	Mark E. Smith, Jim Watts	3:47
2.	"Mountain Energei"	Smith, Dave Milner	3:22
3.	"Theme from Sparta F.C."	Smith, Watts, Ben Pritchard	3:43
4.	"Contraflow"	Smith, Watts	4:06
5.	"Last Commands of Xyralothep Via M.E.S."	Smith, Milner	3:30
6.	"Open the Boxoctosis #2"	Smith, Watts	3:46
7.	"Janet, Johnny + James"	Smith, Pritchard	4:15
8.	"The Past #2"	Smith, Watts	2:20
9.	"Loop41 'Houston"	Lee Hazlewood	3:28
10.	"Mike's Love Xexagon"	Smith, Watts	4:59
11.	"Proteinprotection"	Smith, Watts, Milner, Pritchard	3:19
12.	"Recovery Kit"	Smith, Pritchard	3:58
Total length:			44:31

=== US version ===
The American release is remastered, features an alternate cover and abbreviates the titles of several tracks, although most are identical to their UK counterparts. "Sparta 2#" and "Recovery Kit 2#" are alternate recordings, while "Mod Mock Goth" and "Portugal" were not included on the UK version of the LP but did feature on UK singles.

No.	Title	Writer(s)	Length
1.	"Green Eyed"	Smith, Watts	3:46
2.	"Mountain"	Smith, Milner	3:22
3.	"Sparta 2#"	Smith, Watts, Pritchard	3:49
4.	"Contraflow"	Smith, Watts	4:05
5.	"Xralothep"	Smith, Milner	3:20
6.	"Janet vs. Johnny"	Smith, Pritchard	4:15
7.	"Boxoctosis"	Smith, Watts	3:45
8.	"The Past"	Smith, Watts	2:19
9.	"Mod Mock Goth"	Smith, Elena Poulou	4:12
10.	"Protein Protection"	Smith, Watts, Milner, Pritchard	3:17
11.	"Mike's Love Hexagon"	Smith, Watts	4:59
12.	"41.Loop / Houston"	Hazlewood	3:28
13.	"Portugal"	Smith	3:37
14.	"Recovery Kit 2#"	Smith, Pritchard (Note: Credited on the "(We Wish You) A Protein Christmas" single to Mark E. Smith, Ben Pritchard, Rob Lally.)	4:03
Total length:			52:25

=== Country on the Click (unreleased original version) ===
"Susan vs. Youthclub" was the lead track from the December 2002 "The Fall Vs 2003" single, and was supposed to be the lead-off single to the Country on the Click album.

No.	Title	Writer(s)	Length
1.	"Theme from Sparta F.C."	Smith, Watts, Pritchard	3:51
2.	"Proteinprotection"	Smith, Watts, Milner, Pritchard	3:21
3.	"Mountain Energei"	Smith, Milner	3:31
4.	"Contraflow"	Smith, Watts	4:43
5.	"Green Eyed Loco-Man"	Smith, Watts	4:00
6.	"Last Commands of Xyralothep Via M.E.S."	Smith, Milner	3:23
7.	"Boxoctosis"	Smith, Watts	3:42
8.	"Ho(e)uston"	Hazlewood	3:10
9.	"The Past"	Smith, Watts	3:22
10.	"Recovery Kit"	Smith, Pritchard	4:03
11.	"Mike's Love Xexagon"	Smith, Watts	5:17
12.	"Susan vs. Youthclub"	Smith, Milner	3:37

== Personnel ==
The Fall

- Mark E. Smith – lead vocals
- Ben Pritchard – lead guitar, backing vocals
- Jim Watts – bass guitar, guitar, computer, backing vocals
- Dave Milner – drums, keyboards, backing vocals; lead vocals on "Portugal"
- Elena Poulou – keyboards, backing vocals

Additional musicians

- Simon "Ding" Archer – bass guitar on "Green Eyed Loco Man", "Sparta 2#", "Mad Mock Goth" and "Portugal"; backing vocals on "Portugal"
- S. Beswick – keyboards on "Recovery Kit"
- Ed Blaney – backing vocals

Technical

- Grant Showbiz – production, engineering
- Mark E. Smith – production
- Tim Gracielands – engineering
- Simon "Ding" Archer – engineering
- Jim Watts – engineering
- Mike Boody – engineering
- Marcus Parnell – cover artwork (UK version)
- Adie Russell – cover artwork, drawings (US version)
- Sarah Crespo – cover artwork (US version)
- Shahin Ewalt – cover artwork (US version)
- John "Animal" Dwyer – drawings (US version)
