= Why Are People Grudgeful? =

Single by The Fall
- B-side: "Glam-Racket"
- Released: April 1993
- Genre: Alternative dance
- Length: 4:27
- Label: Permanent
- Songwriter(s): Lee Perry, Joe Gibbs
- Producer(s): Mark E. Smith, Simon Rogers

The Fall singles chronology
"Kimble" (1992)	"Why Are People Grudgeful?" (1993)	"Behind the Counter" (1993)

"Why Are People Grudgeful?" is a 1993 single by British post-punk band The Fall. It reached number 43 on the UK singles chart. The song is based on two Jamaican recordings from 1968, "People Funny Boy" by Lee Perry, and its answer record, "People Grudgeful" by Joe Gibbs, which are regarded as being among the first reggae records.

== Background ==
In the mid-1960s Lee Perry worked with Joe Gibbs at Wirl Records in Kingston, but after a disagreement left to form his label, Upsetter. His first release, "People Funny Boy", credited to Lee (King) Perry, was seen as a direct attack on Gibbs, and became highly popular, heralding the new reggae sound with its "loping, lazy, bass-driven beat". Gibbs retaliated with "People Grudgeful", credited to Sir Gibbs.

== Recording ==
Mark E. Smith combined parts of both Perry's and Gibbs' lyrics in the Fall's version. The band at the time of the recording comprised Smith (vocals), Craig Scanlon (guitar), Steve Hanley (bass), Dave Bush (keyboards), and Simon Wolstencroft (drums, keyboards). The record was produced by ex-Fall member Simon Rogers.

== Release ==
The record was released in April 1993, and reached no.43 on the UK singles chart, the fourth-highest chart placing of any Fall single. A different version of the song was included as a bonus track on the CD edition of the album The Infotainment Scan.
