= Bingo-Master's Break-Out! =

EP by The Fall
- Released: 11 August 1978
- Recorded: 9 November 1977 at Indigo Studios, Manchester, England
- Genre: Post-punk
- Length: 10:02
- Label: Step-Forward
- Producer: The Fall

The Fall chronology
Bingo-Master's Break-Out! (1978)	Live at the Witch Trials (1979)

Professional ratings
Review scores
Source	Rating
AllMusic	4/5 stars

Bingo-Master's Break-Out! is the debut EP by the English post-punk band The Fall. It was released on 11 August 1978 through record label Step-Forward.

== Background ==
Bingo-Master's Break-Out is the only studio recording by the original Fall line-up (Mark E. Smith, Martin Bramah, Tony Friel and Una Baines, plus Karl Burns who replaced the short-lived original drummer Steve Ormrod). The recording was financed by the Buzzcocks manager Richard Boon, who planned to release it on his New Hormones label; unable to afford it, he gave the tapes back to the band. The EP remained unreleased for almost a year, finally coming out in August 1978. By that time, both Friel and Baines had already quit the band, as did Friel's brief replacement Jonnie Brown who designed the cover art.

A fourth track, titled "Frightened", was set to appear on this EP, but it was not deemed up to scratch by frontman Mark E. Smith. A different recording later surfaced on the band's debut album, Live at the Witch Trials, and the original is now believed lost.

== Critical reception ==
The Encyclopedia of Popular Music called the EP "a good example of Smith's surreal vision, coloured by his relentlessly northern working-class vigil."

== Track listing ==
Side A
No.	Title	Writer(s)	Length
1.	"Psycho Mafia"	Mark E. Smith, Tony Friel	2:19
2.	"Bingo-Master" (listed as "Bingo Master" on the label in the centre on the record)	Smith, Una Baines	2:32

Side B
No.	Title	Writer(s)	Length
1.	"Repetition"	Smith, Baines, Karl Burns, Martin Bramah, Friel	5:11

== Personnel ==
The Fall

- Mark E. Smith – vocals
- Martin Bramah – guitar, backing vocals
- Una Baines – electric piano
- Tony Friel – bass guitar, backing vocals
- Karl Burns – drums

Technical

- The Fall – producers
- Phil Hampson – engineer
- Jonnie Brown – cover artwork
