= Live at the Witch Trials =

Studio album by The Fall
- Released: 16 March 1979
- Recorded: 15 December 1978
- Studios: Sound Suite, Camden, England
- Genres: Punk rock; post-punk
- Length: 38:33
- Label: Step-Forward
- Producers: The Fall; Bob Sargeant

The Fall chronology
Bingo-Master's Break-Out! (1978)	Live at the Witch Trials (1979)	Dragnet (1979)

Alternative cover
- Original U.S. cover

Live at the Witch Trials is the debut studio album by the English post-punk band the Fall. It was released on 16 March 1979 through record label Step-Forward. It is not, despite its title, a live album and was recorded in a studio in a single day and mixed by producer Bob Sargeant.

== Production and content ==
The album was recorded at Camden Sound Suite on 15 December 1978 and mixed by producer Bob Sargeant on the 16th. The group had been booked into the studio for five days but Mark E. Smith had fallen ill and cancelled the first three days.

Some of the songs date from earlier incarnations of the group and feature writing credits from former members Tony Friel and Una Baines. Lyrical subject matter includes a tirade against the music industry ("Music Scene"), low-quality jobs ("Industrial Estate") and drugs ("No Xmas for John Quays", "Like to Blow", "Frightened", "Underground Medecin"). "Frightened" was described by Dave McCullough in Sounds as "a breathtaking, ominously culminating monster of a song". "Rebellious Jukebox" was described by Pitchfork as "one of the first self-aware Fall anthems", with the title viewed as "[summing] up The Fall's stance against prevailing trends".

== Release ==
Live at the Witch Trials was released on 16 March 1979 through record label Step-Forward. The U.S. release of the album featured different artwork and removed "Mother-Sister!" and "Industrial Estate", replacing them with "Various Times", the B-side of the group's second single, "It's the New Thing". All subsequent editions have followed the original UK track listing.

No singles were taken from the album, a practice that would be commonplace for the group until 1986. By the time that the album was released, drummer Karl Burns had left the band and guitarist Martin Bramah also quit shortly afterward to form Blue Orchids, leaving Mark E. Smith as the sole remaining founding member.

The album was available in its original form through the late 1980s, reissued on vinyl, cassette and CD by I.R.S. Records in 1989 (with the title misspelled Live at the Witch Trails on the disc). In 1997, Smith's own Cog Sinister label issued a CD edition that was poorly mastered from a below-standard vinyl copy. In conjunction with Voiceprint, Cog Sinister reissued the album in 2002 as Live at the Witch Trials +, which was claimed to have been remastered but was, in fact, simply a clone of the I.R.S. disc with the group's first two singles added, "Bingo-Master's Break-Out!" and "It's the New Thing". In 2004, Castle Music released a two-disc CD "Expanded Deluxe Edition" of the album, mastered from the original tapes and with a vastly expanded track listing. However, the Castle Music reissue used a vinyl source for the three "Bingo-Master's Break-Out!" EP tracks, as the original tapes have been lost.

The album was reissued on vinyl in 2016 on the Superior Viaduct label, and again in 2019 by Cherry Red Records as part of its Fall Sound Archive series. Cherry Red also released a three-disc CD edition with the same bonus tracks as had appeared on the 2004 Castle Music edition.

== Reception ==
Professional ratings
Review scores
Source	Rating
AllMusic	4/5 stars
Mojo	4/5 stars
Pitchfork	8.3/10
Q	5/5 stars
Record Mirror	5/5 stars
The Rolling Stone Album Guide	4/5 stars
Sounds	5/5 stars
Spin Alternative Record Guide	8/10
Uncut	9/10
The Village Voice	B+

Live at the Witch Trials was met with a very positive reception from critics upon its release. Record Mirror's Chris Westwood described the album as "a rugged, concerned, attuned, rebellious jukebox", while Sounds reviewer Dave McCullough called it "an album of staggeringly rich, mature music, inner questioning hand in hand with rock and roll at its fiercest, its finest, its most honest, rock and roll at its naked, most stimulating prime." Robert Christgau of The Village Voice said he initially found it "too tuneless and crude", but later "played it in tandem with Public Image Ltd. one night and for a few bars could hardly tell the difference", concluding that "in this icky pop moment we could use some ugly rebellion." Allan Jones of Melody Maker was less impressed, being especially negative about the group's then-rhythm section of Marc Riley and Karl Burns.

In a retrospective review, Tiny Mix Tapes praised Live at the Witch Trials as a "fully-formed, instant-classic debut album". Trouser Press said that it showed the band "at once leaning towards punk's directness and charging headlong into poetic pretension". Pitchfork's Jason Heller stated that the album was "the liminal space between punk and post-punk" and that it established the Fall as a musically "far more wobbly and toxic" band than their post-punk contemporaries. AllMusic critic Ned Raggett wrote: "That the first Fall album... would not only not sound very punk at all but would be a downright pleasant listen seems perfectly in keeping with Mark E. Smith's endlessly contrary mind." In 2018, Billboard ranked Live at the Witch Trials as the sixth-best Fall album; in an accompanying essay, Geeta Dayal wrote that "there were more ideas on this album than there are in some other bands' entire discographies."

== Track listing ==
Side A
No.	Title	Writer(s)	Length
1.	"Frightened"	Mark E. Smith, Tony Friel	5:02
2.	"Crap Rap 2/Like to Blow"	Smith, Martin Bramah	2:04
3.	"Rebellious Jukebox"	Smith, Bramah	2:51
4.	"No Xmas for John Quays"	Smith	4:38
5.	"Mother-Sister!"	Smith, Una Baines	3:20
6.	"Industrial Estate"	Smith, Bramah, Friel	2:00

Side B
No.	Title	Writer(s)	Length
7.	"Underground Medecin"	Smith, Bramah	2:08
8.	"Two Steps Back"	Smith, Bramah	5:03
9.	"Live at the Witch Trials"	Smith	0:51
10.	"Futures and Pasts"	Smith, Bramah	2:36
11.	"Music Scene"	Smith, Bramah, Yvonne Pawlett, Marc Riley	8:00

=== 2004 reissue ===
Bonus tracks
No.	Title	Writer(s)	Length
12.	"Bingo-Master" (Bingo-Master's Break-Out! EP, 1978)	Smith, Baines	2:22
13.	"Psycho Mafia" (Bingo-Master's Break-Out!)	Smith, Friel	2:14
14.	"Repetition" (Bingo-Master's Break-Out!)	Smith, Baines, Bramah, Burns, Friel	4:55
15.	"It's the New Thing" (Non-album single, 1978)	Smith, Bramah	3:27
16.	"Various Times" (B-side to "It's the New Thing")	Smith, Bramah, Burns, Pawlett, Riley	6:39
17.	"Dresden Dolls" (Bootleg single; 1977 rehearsal recording)	Smith, Baines, Bramah, Burns, Friel	3:37
18.	"Psycho Mafia" (Bootleg single; 1977 rehearsal recording)	Smith, Friel	2:20
19.	"Industrial Estate" (Bootleg single; 1977 rehearsal recording)	Smith, Bramah, Friel	1:47
20.	"Stepping Out" (Live) (Short Circuit: Live at the Electric Circus, 1978)	Smith, Friel	2:45
21.	"Last Orders" (Live) (Short Circuit: Live at the Electric Circus)	Smith, Friel	2:21

Disc 2
No.	Title	Writer(s)	Length
1.	"Rebellious Jukebox" (BBC Session)	Smith, Bramah	3:00
2.	"Mother-Sister!" (BBC Session)	Smith, Baines	3:07
3.	"Industrial Estate" (BBC Session)	Smith, Bramah, Friel	1:45
4.	"Futures and Pasts" (BBC Session)	Smith, Bramah	2:35
5.	"Put Away" (BBC Session)	Smith	3:34
6.	"Mess of My" (BBC Session)	Smith, Bramah, Rick Goldstraw	3:13
7.	"No Xmas for John Key" (BBC Session)	Smith	4:14
8.	"Like to Blow" (BBC Session)	Smith, Bramah	1:47
9.	"Like to Blow" (Live)	Smith, Bramah	2:05
10.	"Stepping Out" (Live)	Smith, Friel	3:09
11.	"Two Steps Back" (Live)	Smith, Bramah	5:51
12.	"Mess of My" (Live)	Smith, Bramah, Goldstraw	3:24
13.	"It's the New Thing" (Live)	Smith, Bramah	3:48
14.	"Various Times" (Live)	Smith, Bramah, Burns, Pawlett, Riley	4:59
15.	"Bingo-Master" (Live)	Smith, Baines	2:48
16.	"Frightened" (Live)	Smith, Friel	5:35
17.	"Industrial Estate" (Live)	Smith, Bramah, Friel	1:53
18.	"Psycho Mafia" (Live)	Smith, Friel	3:01
19.	"Music Scene" (Live)	Smith, Bramah, Pawlett, Riley	9:26
20.	"Mother-Sister!" (Live)	Smith, Baines	3:31

Notes

- Disc 1 tracks 20–21: live at the Electric Circus, Manchester, October 1977
- Disc 2 tracks 1–4: John Peel Session, 15 June 1978
- Disc 2 tracks 5–8: John Peel Session, 6 December 1978
- Disc 2 tracks 9–20: live at Mr. Pickwick's, Liverpool, 22 August 1978; previously released as the 2001 album Liverpool 78.

=== 2019 reissue ===
The first disc contains the eleven tracks from the original album. Disc 2 and 3 include the same bonus tracks, in the same order, as the 2004 reissue.

Disc 2 – Singles/Rehearsals/Live/Sessions

1. "Bingo-Master"
2. "Psycho Mafia"
3. "Repetition"
4. "It's the New Thing"
5. "Various Times"
6. "Dresden Dolls" (Rehearsal)
7. "Psycho Mafia" (Rehearsal)
8. "Industrial Estate" (Rehearsal)
9. "Stepping Out" (Live)
10. "Last Orders" (Live)
11. "Rebellious Jukebox" (BBC Session)
12. "Mother-Sister!" (BBC Session)
13. "Industrial Estate" (BBC Session)
14. "Futures and Pasts" (BBC Session)
15. "Put Away" (BBC Session)
16. "Mess of My" (BBC Session)
17. "No Xmas for John Key" (BBC Session)
18. "Like to Blow" (BBC Session)

Disc 3 – Mr. Pickwick's, Liverpool '78

1. "Like to Blow" (Live)
2. "Stepping Out" (Live)
3. "Two Steps Back" (Live)
4. "Mess of My" (Live)
5. "It's the New Thing" (Live)
6. "Various Times" (Live)
7. "Bingo-Master" (Live)
8. "Frightened" (Live)
9. "Industrial Estate" (Live)
10. "Psycho Mafia" (Live)
11. "Music Scene" (Live)
12. "Mother-Sister!" (Live)

== Personnel ==
The Fall

- Mark E. Smith – vocals, guitar ("Live at the Witch Trials"), tapes ("Music Scene")
- Martin Bramah – guitar, backing vocals, arrangements, production
- Marc Riley – bass guitar, production
- Karl Burns – drums, production
- Yvonne Pawlett – keyboards, production

The voice calling the time on "Music Scene" ("six minutes!", "six forty!") is the group's driver, the son of the actor Peter Adamson, who had played Len Fairclough in Coronation Street.

Technical

- Bob Sargeant – production
- Alvin Clark – engineer
- John Wriothesley – front-cover artwork
- Graham Rhodes – sleeve photography
- Steve Lyons – sleeve photography

== Sources ==
- Pringle, Steve. You Must Get Them All: The Fall on Record. London: Route Publishing, 2022. ISBN 978-1-9019-2788-7
