= 2G+2 =

Compilation album by The Fall
- Released: 10 June 2002
- Recorded: Mid–late 2001
- Genre: Post-punk
- Length: 43:37
- Label: Action Records
- Producer: Mark E. Smith; Ed Blaney

The Fall chronology
Are You Are Missing Winner (2001)	2G+2 (2002)	The Real New Fall LP (Formerly Country on the Click) (2003)

Professional ratings
Review scores
Source	Rating
Allmusic	1.5/5 stars

2G+2 is an album of mixed live and studio material by English rock band the Fall, released in 2002. It features three new songs recorded in the studio—"New Formation Sermon", "I Wake Up in the City" and "Distilled Mug Art"—and the rest of the album was recorded at performances on the group's United States tour in late 2001.

== Track listing ==
No.	Title	Writer(s)	Length
1.	"The Joke" (live at the Crocodile Cafe, Seattle 20 November 2001)	Mark E. Smith, Brix Smith	3:48
2.	"New Formation Sermon" (studio recording)	M. Smith	2:04
3.	"My Ex-Classmates Kids" (live at the Knitting Factory, New York 25 November 2001)	M. Smith, Ed Blaney	3:26
4.	"Enigrammatic Dream" (live at the Knitting Factory, New York 25 November 2001)	M. Smith	2:08
5.	"I Wake Up in the City" (studio recording)	M. Smith, Blaney	4:39
6.	"Kick the Can" (live at the Knitting Factory, New York 25 November 2001)	M. Smith, Ben Pritchard	2:00
7.	"F-'oldin' Money" (live at the Knitting Factory, New York 25 November 2001)	Tommy Blake, W. S. Stephenson, Carl Belew	4:24
8.	"Bourgeois Town" (live at the Knitting Factory, New York 23 November 2001)	Lead Belly, arr. M. Smith	4:44
9.	"Distilled Mug Art" (studio recording)	M. Smith, Blaney	3:33
10.	"Ibis-Afro Man" (live at the Knitting Factory, Los Angeles 15 November 2001)	M. Smith, Jim Watts, Iggy Pop, Scott Thurston	3:46
11.	"Mr Pharmacist" (live at the Knitting Factory, New York 23 November 2001)	Jeff Nowlen	2:23
12.	"I Am Damo Suzuki" (live at the Knitting Factory, Los Angeles 15 November 2001)	M. Smith, B. Smith, Karl Burns	6:41

== Personnel ==
The Fall

- Mark E. Smith – vocals
- Ben Pritchard – guitar, vocals
- Jim Watts – bass guitar, vocals
- Spencer Birtwistle – drums

Additional musicians

- Brian Fanning – guitar (studio tracks only)
- Ed Blaney – guitar (studio tracks only); additional vocals on "Ibis-Afro Man"

Technical

- Mark E. Smith – production, compilation
- Ed Blaney – production, compilation
- Pascal Le Gras - cover art
