= The Unutterable =

Studio album by the Fall
- Released: 6 November 2000
- Recorded: Mid-2000
- Studio: Testa Rossa Studios, Manchester; Streetlevel 2 Studio, London; Sonic Surgery, Manchester
- Genre: Alternative rock
- Length: 55:42
- Label: Eagle
- Producer: Grant Showbiz; Mark E. Smith

The Fall chronology
Live 1977 (2000)	The Unutterable (2000)	Liverpool 78 (2001)

Professional ratings
Review scores
Source	Rating
AllMusic	4/5 stars
The Guardian	4/5 stars
Mojo	favourable
NME	5/10 stars
Time Out	favourable
Uncut	4/5 stars

The Unutterable is the 21st album by English rock band the Fall, released in 2000. It was recorded with much the same lineup as had appeared on the group's previous album, 1999's The Marshall Suite (although Kazuko Hohki—the singer from the English-based Japanese band Frank Chickens—provides extra vocals on one track). However, whilst this version of the band was still coming together as the previous album was being made, by the time of the current record, they had had a year to gel as a unit. Therefore, while there is some similarity in the sound of the two, The Unutterable was much more consistent in its production and songwriting. It was generally well received by the critics, being praised as a "career peak" by Dave Simpson of The Guardian and prompting Piers Martin of the NME to suggest, "...this is as vital and relevant as The Fall have sounded for a considerable length of time. "

Lyrically, the album covers a number of diverse themes. On "Dr Bucks' Letter", lead singer Mark E. Smith appears to dispraise superficial materialist modernity, stating, "I was in the realm of the essence of Tong", an oblique reference to British DJ Pete Tong. In the song, Smith lists the five things without which he, or that Tong, cannot leave home: sunglasses, music, PalmPilot, mobile phone and American Express card. Elsewhere on the album, Smith's lyrics discuss issues such as drugs on the ranting "Ketamine Sun", and his favourite meal on the jazz-influenced "Pumpkin Soup and Mashed Potatoes".

The Unutterable is notable for not featuring a cover song in any format, unlike all of the group's other studio albums from Bend Sinister forward; although "Ketamine Sun" reportedly started life as a cover of Lou Reed's "Kill Your Sons", there is little musical similarity between the two tracks.

This was the first and only Fall 'official' studio release to be issued on CD only, without a corresponding vinyl version. A double-LP set was eventually issued through Let Them Eat Vinyl in 2014 with the same track listing.

== Track listing ==
All tracks are written by Mark E. Smith, Julia Nagle, Tom Head, Adam Helal and Neville Wilding, except where noted.

No.	Title	Writer(s)	Length
1.	"Cyber Insekt"		3:19
2.	"Two Librans"		3:57
3.	"W.B"		3:30
4.	"Sons of Temperance"		3:47
5.	"Dr Bucks' Letter"		5:19
6.	"Hot Runes"		2:18
7.	"Way Round"	Smith, Nagle, Head, Helal	3:21
8.	"Octo Realm/Ketamine Sun"	Smith, Nagle, Grant Cunliffe, Helal, Head	5:36
9.	"Serum"		4:56
10.	"Unutterable"		1:05
11.	"Pumpkin Soup and Mashed Potatoes"	Smith, Nagle, Cunliffe, Helal	2:54
12.	"Hands Up Billy"	Wilding	2:47
13.	"Midwatch 1953"		5:32
14.	"Devolute"		4:36
15.	"Das Katerer"	Smith, Nagle, Simon Wolstencroft	2:42
Total length:			55:42

=== 2008 Special Deluxe Edition ===
Disc 1 - The Unutterable
as per original CD

Disc 2 - Testa Rossa monitor mixes

No.	Title	Length
1.	"Serum"	4:53
2.	"Two Librans"	3:39
3.	"Hands Up Billy"	2:46
4.	"Cyber Insekt"	3:25
5.	"Dr. Buck's Letter"	5:16
6.	"Midwatch 1953"	5:47
7.	"Sons of Temperance"	3:43
8.	"W.B"	2:07
9.	"Octo Realm / Ketamine Sun"	2:30
10.	"Devolute"	3:31
11.	"Hot Rune"	1:53
12.	"Instrum One"	2:05
13.	"Instrum Two aka Two"	3:31
Total length:		45:15

Notes

- The Testa Rossa monitor mixes are early, rough versions of most of the album tracks, as well as two instrumentals not used on the final album. On the reissue, the position of the apostrophe has changed in "Dr. Bucks' Letter" to "Dr. Buck's Letter".

== Personnel ==
The Fall

- Mark E. Smith – vocals, sound effects
- Julia Nagle – keyboards, guitar, backing vocals, programming
- Neville Wilding – guitar, backing vocals; lead vocals on "Hands Up Billy"
- Adam Helal – bass guitar, Pro Tools, backing vocals
- Tom Head – drums, percussion, backing vocals

Additional personnel

- Kazuko Hohki – vocals on "Cyber Insekt"
- Steve Evets – vocals on "Midwatch 1953"
- Ben Pritchard – guitar on "Dr. Bucks' Letter" and "Midwatch 1953"
- Grant Showbiz – backing vocals; arrangement on "Pumpkin Soup and Mashed Potatoes"
- Rob Ayling – executive producer, voice on "Octo Realm" (uncredited)

Technical

- Grant Showbiz – production
- Mark E. Smith – production
- Adam Helal – engineering, programming (Sonic Surgery)
- Andy Drelincourt – engineering, programming (Testa Rossa)
- Mike Body – engineering, programming (Streetlevel 2)
- Pascal Le Gras – cover art
