= Theme from Sparta F.C. =

"Theme from Sparta F.C. #2"

Single by The Fall

from the album The Real New Fall LP (Formerly Country on the Click)
- B-side: "My Ex Classmate's Kids"
- Released: June 2004
- Genre: Post-punk
- Length: 3:52
- Label: Action Records
- Songwriter(s): Mark E. Smith, Ben Pritchard, Jim Watts
- Producer(s): Mark E. Smith, Simon Archer

The Fall singles chronology
"(We Wish You) A Protein Christmas" (2003)	"Theme from Sparta F.C. #2" (2004)	"2 Librans" (2004)

"Theme from Sparta F.C." is a song by British post-punk band the Fall, written by Mark E. Smith with band members Ben Pritchard and Jim Watts.

== Lyrics ==
The song lyrics seem to be written from the perspective of a Greek football fan, with references to rivalries with Galatasaray and Chelsea F.C. Smith said that "Elena came up with some great words and I added some words I thought were like the Greek football fans' attitude, you know. I do know quite a few Greek football fans, and their attitude to soccer is completely different to Britain. Sort of cobbled it all together, put a Greek motif on the guitar and that was it."

== Album version ==
After an early version was recorded for a John Peel Radio 1 session, the song was recorded at the Gracielands Studio in Rochdale. Produced by Grant "Showbiz" Cunliffe and Mark E. Smith, it was first released on the band's 2003 UK album The Real New Fall LP (Formerly Country on the Click). Band personnel were Mark E. Smith (vocals), Ben Pritchard (guitar, vocals), Jim Watts (bass, guitar, computers), Dave Milner (drums, vocals, keyboards) and Elena Poulou (keyboards, vocals).

== Single version ==
A different version of the song was recorded by the band in early 2004, after Simon Archer replaced Watts. This version, produced by Smith and Archer and known as "Theme from Sparta F.C. #2", was issued as a single in July 2004, and reached number 66 on the UK singles chart. The 2004 recording was also included on the US issue of The Real New Fall LP. It was voted number one in John Peel's 2004 "Festive Fifty".

From 2005 until 2009, the song was used as theme music to the Final Score section of BBC television's Saturday afternoon sports coverage, and as a result Smith was invited on one occasion to read the football scores.
