= Martin Bramah =

- Also known as: Martin Bramah
- Born: Martin Beddington; 18 September 1957 (age 68); Manchester, England
- Genres: Post-punk
- Occupation: Singer/songwriter musician
- Instrument(s): Vocals, guitar
- Years active: 1977–present
- Labels: Tiny Global Productions

Martin Beddington (born 18 September 1957 in Manchester), better known by his stage name Martin Bramah, is an English singer-songwriter and guitarist, best known as a founding member of the Fall, Blue Orchids, Thirst, Factory Star and House of All.

== Early career ==
Bramah met Mark E. Smith and original Fall keyboard player Una Baines towards the end of 1975; Bramah and founding bassist Tony Friel were friends with Smith's sister Barbara. He remained in The Fall until April 1979, having co-written most of the band's repertoire until then, including most songs on their debut album Live at the Witch Trials. Bramah quit mid-tour due to tension between himself and Smith. Simon Ford states in "Hip Priest" that Bramah's relationship with Baines was one cause of this. Bramah later claimed that the band "was getting a bit dictatorial and we were just 19–20 year-old kids. I wanted to be wild and free and do my own thing."

He formed the influential post-punk band Blue Orchids with Baines. The group had early success but went on hiatus when the couple married and had a child; they later separated. Bramah and Baines reformed the Blue Orchids in 1985 and released the single "Sleepytown"; two more singles in 1991 and 1992 featured a different line-up, with Bramah the only constant.

Bramah formed Thirst in 1987 with former Fall drummer Karl Burns, bassist Lee Pickering and guitarist Carrie Lawson. The band were more oriented towards garage rock than the influences of his earlier post-punk bands. Thirst only released one EP, Riding the Times. In 1989, Bramah rejoined The Fall to replace Brix and contributed guitar to Extricate. Bramah's second tenure in The Fall lasted just over a year, as he (together with keyboardist Marcia Schofield) was sacked at the end of the Australasian tour in July 1990. While Mark E. Smith later cited his desire to strip down the band's sound from a sextet to a smaller ensemble, the actual cause behind the sackings was Smith being unhappy about Bramah and Schofield having an affair which he felt hampered their musicianship.

== Recent years ==
In 2008, he formed Factory Star, initially featuring Tim Lyons and Brian Benson (of The Sandells), subsequently featuring fellow ex-Fall members Steve Hanley on bass, Paul Hanley on drums and John Paul Moran of Rapid Pig, Gnod and the Monochrome Set on keyboards. The Hanley brothers departed during 2010 to be replaced by Chris Dutton (formerly of Sicknurse and Kill Pretty) and Tom Lewis. Their debut album Enter Castle Perilous was released on Occultation Records in 2011.

The Blue Orchids, revived by Bramah again in 2003 and featuring him as the only original member, have released seven albums of new material since 2003.

In 2023 Bramah formed House of All, composed exclusively of former members of The Fall, all of whom he had worked with in various versions of The Fall, except Peter Greenaway. As of 2025, House of All had released three albums of new material. The 2025 release was the first to feature Fall drummer Karl Burns.

== Sources ==
- Ford, Simon (2003). Hip Priest. Quartet Books. ISBN 0-7043-8167-2.
- Hanley, Steve. "The Big Midweek: Life Inside The Fall". London: Route, 2014. ISBN 978-1-9019-2758-0
