= There's a Ghost in My House =

Single by R. Dean Taylor
- B-side: "Don't Fool Around"; UK: "Let's Go Somewhere"
- Released: April 1967; UK: 1974
- Genre: R&B, pop
- Label: V.I.P. 25042; UK: Tamla Motown TMG 896
- Songwriters: Brian Holland, Lamont Dozier, Eddie Holland, R. Dean Taylor
- Producers: Brian Holland, Lamont Dozier

Official audio
- "There's a Ghost in My House" on YouTube

"There's a Ghost in My House" is a song written by Brian Holland, Lamont Dozier, and Eddie Holland of Motown Records, together with R. Dean Taylor. It was originally recorded by Taylor in 1966, and it reached No. 3 in 1974 in the UK.

== Background ==
"There's a Ghost in My House" was produced by Brian Holland and Lamont Dozier. It was released as a single on the Motown subsidiary V.I.P. label in April 1967, but was not a hit. However, after it had become a popular dance song in Northern soul clubs in Britain, such as the Blackpool Mecca and Wigan Casino, R. Dean Taylor's record was reissued on EMI's Tamla Motown label with a B-side of "Let's Go Somewhere", and reached No. 3 on the UK Singles Chart in 1974.

=== Charts ===
==== R. Dean Taylor ====
Chart (1974)	Peak position
Netherlands (Single Top 100)	30
UK Singles (Official Charts)	3

== Covers ==
Versions were later recorded by British bands, Yachts (1980), B.E.F. (British Electric Foundation) featuring Paul Jones (1982), and the Very Things (1987). A version recorded by the Fall in 1987 became their first single to reach the top 50 in the UK, peaking at No. 30, and was included on their album The Frenz Experiment. Graham Parker recorded a version released in 2000 on Loose Monkeys: Spare Tracks and Lost Demos. A cover by UK punk band the Damned was released as a single on the 30th of October 2025 and features on the covers album Not Like Everybody Else, released in January 2026.
