= The Fall discography =

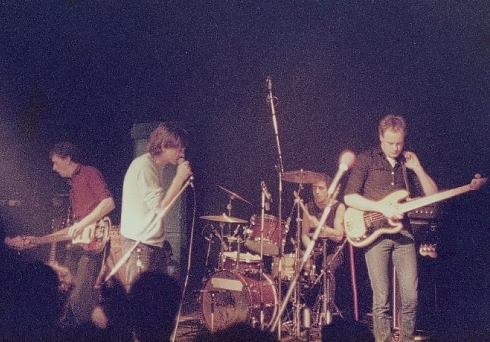
- The Fall in Hamburg, 13 April 1984
- Studio albums: 31
- Extended plays: 12
- Live albums: 59
- Compilation albums: 44
- Singles: 60
- Video albums: 10
- Part studio, part live albums: 6
- Box sets: 17

The Fall released many recordings following their inception in 1976. The band’s debut on vinyl came in June 1978 when "Stepping Out" and "Last Orders" were released by Virgin Records on Short Circuit: Live at the Electric Circus, a compilation of live recordings made at the Manchester venue The Electric Circus in October 1977 just before it was closed. Their first actual release as a group was the EP Bingo-Master's Break Out! (1978), and they released a studio album at a rate of almost one a year from their debut Live at the Witch Trials in 1979 to their final album Post Script in 2026.

== Studio albums ==
Title	Album details	Peak chart positions		
Title	Album details	UK	UK Indie	NZ
Live at the Witch Trials	Released: 16 March 1979; Label: Step-Forward; Formats: LP	—	19 (Note: Chart position in 2019)	—
Dragnet	Released: 26 October 1979; Label: Step-Forward; Formats: LP	—	21	—
Grotesque (After the Gramme)	Released: 17 November 1980; Label: Rough Trade; Formats: LP, MC	—	1	38
Hex Enduction Hour	Released: 8 March 1982; Label: Kamera; Formats: LP, MC	71	2	11
Room to Live	Released: 27 September 1982; Label: Kamera; Formats: LP	—	4	—
Perverted by Language	Released: 12 December 1983; Label: Rough Trade; Formats: LP, MC	—	1	—
The Wonderful and Frightening World Of...	Released: 12 October 1984; Label: Beggars Banquet; Formats: LP, MC	62	27 (Note: Chart position in 2010.)	—
This Nation's Saving Grace	Released: 23 September 1985; Label: Beggars Banquet; Formats: LP, MC	54	26 (Note: Chart position in 2011.)	—
Bend Sinister	Released: 29 September 1986; Label: Beggars Banquet; Formats: CD, LP, MC	36	16	—
The Frenz Experiment	Released: 29 February 1988; Label: Beggars Banquet; Formats: CD, LP, MC	19	23 (Note: Chart position in 2020.)	—
I Am Kurious Oranj	Released: 31 October 1988; Label: Beggars Banquet; Formats: CD, LP, MC	54	—	—
Extricate	Released: 19 February 1990; Label: Cog Sinister/Fontana; Formats: CD, LP, MC	31	—	—
Shift-Work	Released: 15 April 1991; Label: Cog Sinister/Fontana; Formats: CD, LP, MC	17	—	—
Code: Selfish	Released: 9 March 1992; Label: Cog Sinister/Fontana; Formats: CD, LP, MC	21	—	—
The Infotainment Scan	Released: 26 April 1993; Label: Cog Sinister/Permanent; Formats: CD, LP, MC	9	21 (Note: Chart position in 2021.)	—
Middle Class Revolt	Released: 3 May 1994; Label: Cog Sinister/Permanent; Formats: CD, LP, MC	48	31	—
Cerebral Caustic	Released: 27 February 1995; Label: Cog Sinister/Permanent; Formats: CD, LP, MC	67	23 (Note: Chart position in 2020.)	—
The Light User Syndrome	Released: 10 June 1996; Label: Jet; Formats: CD, LP, MC	54	—	—
Levitate	Released: 29 September 1997; Label: Artful; Formats: CD, 2×CD, LP, MC	117	14	—
The Marshall Suite	Released: 19 April 1999; Label: Artful; Formats: CD, 2×LP, MC	84	—	—
The Unutterable	Released: 6 November 2000; Label: Eagle; Formats: CD	136	—	—
Are You Are Missing Winner	Released: 5 November 2001; Label: Cog Sinister/Voiceprint; Formats: CD, LP	—	14	—
The Real New Fall LP (Formerly Country on the Click)	Released: 27 October 2003; Label: Action; Formats: CD, LP	156	13	—
Fall Heads Roll	Released: 3 October 2005; Label: Slogan; Formats: CD, LP	115	13	—
Reformation Post TLC	Released: 12 February 2007; Label: Slogan; Formats: CD, 2×LP	78	1	—
Imperial Wax Solvent	Released: 28 April 2008; Label: Sanctuary; Formats: CD, LP	35	41 (Note: Chart position in 2020.)	—
Your Future Our Clutter	Released: 26 April 2010; Label: Domino; Formats: CD, 2×LP	38	1	—
Ersatz GB	Released: 14 November 2011; Label: Cherry Red; Formats: CD, LP, digital download	88	9	—
Re-Mit	Released: 13 May 2013; Label: Cherry Red; Formats: CD, LP, digital download	40	9	—
Sub-Lingual Tablet	Released: 11 May 2015; Label: Cherry Red; Formats: CD, 2×LP, digital download	58	8	—
New Facts Emerge	Released: 28 July 2017; Label: Cherry Red; Formats: CD, 2×10", digital download	35	3	—
"—" denotes releases that did not chart or were not released in that territory.

== Part studio, part live albums ==
Title	Album details	Peak chart positions	
Title	Album details	UK	UK Indie
Totale's Turns (It's Now or Never)	Released: 5 May 1980; Label: Rough Trade; Formats: LP	—	1
Seminal Live	Released: 26 June 1989; Label: Beggars Banquet; Formats: CD, LP, MC	40	—
The Twenty-Seven Points	Released: 7 August 1995; Label: Cog Sinister/Permanent; Formats: 2xCD, 2xLP, 2xMC	—	—
2G+2	Released: 10 June 2002; Label: Action; Formats: CD	116	—
Interim	Released: 1 November 2004; Label: Hip Priest; Formats: CD	—	—
Live Uurop VIII-XII Places In Sun & Winter, Son	Released: 27 October 2014; Label: Cherry Red; Formats: CD, 2xLP	—	—
"—" denotes releases that did not chart.

== Live albums ==
Title	Album details	Peak chart positions		
Title	Album details	UK	UK Indie	NZ
Live in London 1980	Released: February 1982; Label: Chaos Tapes; Formats: MC; Recorded at the Acklam Hall, 1980	—	7	—
A Part of America Therein, 1981	Released: May 1982; Label: Cottage; Formats: LP; US-only release	—	9	—
Fall in a Hole	Released: November 1983; Label: Flying Nun; Formats: LP; Recorded at Mainstreet Cabaret, Auckland, 1982; New Zealand-only release	—	—	47
BBC Radio 1 Live in Concert	Released: 2 August 1993; Label: Windsong International; Formats: CD; Recorded at Nottingham Rock City, 1987	—	—	—
In the City...	Released: 27 January 1997; Label: Artful; Formats: LP; Recorded at the Manchester Roadhouse, 1995	—	—	—
15 Ways to Leave Your Man	Released: 11 August 1997; Label: Receiver; Formats: CD; Recorded at the London Astoria, 1996	—	—	—
Live to Air in Melbourne '82	Released: 4 May 1998; Label: Cog Sinister; Formats: CD; Recorded at the Prince of Wales Hotel, 1982	—	—	—
Live Various Years	Released: September 1998; Label: Cog Sinister; Formats: 2xCD	—	—	—
Nottingham '92	Released: November 1998; Label: Cog Sinister; Formats: CD; Recorded at Trent Polytechnic, 1992	—	—	—
Live 1977	Released: March 2000; Label: Cog Sinister; Formats: CD; Recorded at the Stretford Civic Centre, 1977	—	46 (Note: Chart position in 2023.)	—
I Am as Pure as Oranj	Released: July 2000; Label: NMC Music; Formats: CD; Recorded at the Edinburgh Festival, 1988	—	—	—
Live in Cambridge 1988	Released: October 2000; Label: Cog Sinister; Formats: CD; Recorded at the Corn Exchange, 1988	—	—	—
Austurbaejarbio (Live in Reykjavik 1983)	Released: 5 February 2001; Label: Cog Sinister; Formats: CD	—	—	—
Live in Zagreb	Released: 4 June 2001; Label: Cog Sinister; Formats: CD; Recorded at Dom Sportova, 1990	—	—	—
Liverpool 78	Released: 4 June 2001; Label: Cog Sinister; Formats: CD; Recorded at Mr Pickwick's, 1978	—	—	—
The Idiot Joy Show	Released: 14 July 2003; Label: Alchemy Entertainment; Formats: 2xCD; Recorded at the Cambridge Junction, 1995; the Roskilde Festival, Denmark, 1996; and the Phoenix Festival, 1996	—	—	—
Live at the Phoenix Festival	Released: 29 September 2003; Label: Strange Fruit; Formats: CD; Recorded in 1995 and 1996	—	—	—
Live at Deeply Vale	Released: 6 June 2005; Label: Ozit-Morpheus; Formats: CD; Recorded at the People's Free Festival, 1978	—	—	—
Live from the Vaults – Oldham 1978	Released: 15 August 2005; Label: Hip Priest; Formats: CD	—	—	—
Live from the Vaults – Retford 1979	Released: 15 August 2005; Label: Hip Priest; Formats: CD	—	—	—
Live from the Vaults – Los Angeles 1979	Released: 15 August 2005; Label: Hip Priest; Formats: CD	—	—	—
Live from the Vaults – Glasgow 1981	Released: 21 November 2005; Label: Hip Priest; Formats: CD	—	—	—
Live from the Vaults – Alter Bahnhof, Hof, Germany 1981	Released: 21 November 2005; Label: Hip Priest; Formats: CD	—	—	—
Live at the Knitting Factory, New York 9 April 2004	Released: 29 January 2007; Label: Hip Priest; Formats: CD	—	—	—
Live at the Garage, London 20 April 2002	Released: 29 January 2007; Label: Hip Priest; Formats: CD	—	—	—
Live at the Knitting Factory, LA 14 November 2001	Released: 19 February 2007; Label: Hip Priest; Formats: CD	—	—	—
Live at the ATP Festival 28 April 2002	Released: 19 February 2007; Label: Hip Priest; Formats: CD	—	—	—
Last Night at the Palais	Released: 24 August 2009; Label: Universal Music; Formats: CD+DVD; Recorded at the Hammersmith Palais, 2007	—	—	—
Live in San Francisco	Released: 17 June 2013; Label: Ozit-Morpheus; Formats: CD, 2xLP; Recorded at the Great American Music Hall, 2001	—	—	—
Creative Distortion	Released: 22 September 2014; Label: Secret; Formats: 2xCD+DVD; Recorded at King George's Hall, Blackburn, 2002	—	—	—
Yarbles	Released: 29 September 2014; Label: Secret; Formats: LP; Highlights from Creative Distortion	—	—	—
Live in Clitheroe	Released: 22 April 2017; Label: Ozit-Morpheus; Formats: CD, LP, digital download	—	—	—
Live 1993 11th October Batschkapp Frankfurt Germany	Released: 26 October 2018; Label: Cog Sinister; Formats: CD, digital download	—	—	—
Live at Doornroosje, Nijmegen, 1999	Released: 26 October 2018; Label: Cog Sinister; Formats: CD, digital download	—	—	—
Live at the Assembly Rooms, Derby, 1994	Released: 16 November 2018; Label: Cog Sinister; Formats: CD, digital download	—	—	—
Live at the Astoria Theatre, 1995	Released: 16 November 2018; Label: Cog Sinister; Formats: CD	—	—	—
Live at TJ's, Newport, Wales, 2001	Released: December 2018; Label: Cog Sinister; Formats: CD, digital download	—	—	—
Sheffield Poly 26-11-1986	Released: 24 January 2019; Label: Sheffield Tape Archive; Formats: digital download	—	—	—
Sheffield Leadmill 16-12-1989	Released: 24 January 2019; Label: Sheffield Tape Archive; Formats: digital download	—	—	—
Sheffield Boardwalk 6-10-2005	Released: 24 January 2019; Label: Sheffield Tape Archive; Formats: digital download	—	—	—
Live at the Corn Exchange, Kings Lynn, 1996	Released: 22 February 2019; Label: Cog Sinister; Formats: CD, digital download	—	—	—
Live 1997 30th November Stage Stoke UK	Released: 22 February 2019; Label: Cog Sinister; Formats: CD, digital download	—	—	—
Live at the Cedar Ballroom, Birmingham, 1980	Released: 1 March 2019; Label: Cog Sinister; Formats: CD, digital download	—	—	—
Live 23rd June 1981 @ Jimmy's Music Club New Orleans	Released: March 2019; Label: Cog Sinister; Formats: CD	—	—	—
Live @ Pavillion Bar Cork 21st July 2012	Released: March 2019; Label: Cog Sinister; Formats: CD, digital download	—	—	—
Live @ the Soy Festival Nantes 31 October 2013	Released: 19 March 2019; Label: Cog Sinister; Formats: digital download	—	—	—
Live @ Cathedral Quarter Arts Festival Belfast 8th May 2013	Released: 26 March 2019; Label: Cog Sinister; Formats: CD, digital download	—	—	—
Live @ ICC Hannover 11th April 1984	Released: 2 April 2019; Label: Cog Sinister; Formats: CD, digital download	—	—	—
Live at Band on the Wall, Manchester, 1982	Released: 5 April 2019; Label: Cog Sinister; Formats: CD, digital download	—	—	—
Live 1998 Astoria 2 12 August	Released: 3 May 2019; Label: Cog Sinister; Formats: CD, digital download	—	—	—
Live @ MOHU Manchester 11 November 2009	Released: 29 January 2020; Label: Cog Sinister; Formats: digital download	—	—	—
Live @ Newcastle Riverside 4th November 2011	Released: 10 July 2020; Label: Cog Sinister; Formats: CD	—	—	—
Live @ Brudenel Social Club, Leeds 30th November 2012	Released: 4 September 2020; Label: Cog Sinister; Formats: CD	—	—	—
Take It Down to the Wire at Clitheroe Castle	Released: 4 December 2020; Label: Ozit-Morpheus; Formats: LP	—	—	—
Live @ Tramps, New York, 10th September 1994	Released: 11 February 2021; Label: Let Them Eat Vinyl; Formats: LP, digital download	—	—	—
Live at St. Helen's Technical College, 1981	Released: 19 February 2021; Label: Castle Face; Formats: LP+7"	—	17	—
Live @ The Button Factory Dublin August 17th 2013	Released: 26 February 2021; Label: Cog Sinister; Formats: CD, digital download	—	—	—
Live @ Edinburgh Liquid Rooms 10th October 2001	Released: 19 March 2021; Label: Cog Sinister; Formats: CD, digital download	—	—	—
Out Ferroviarios	Released: 15 October 2021; Label: Cog Sinister; Formats: 2xCD; Recorded at OUT.FEST Festival Internacional de Musica Exploratoria de Barreiro, Portugal, 2013	—	—	—
Futures and Pasts – Live	Released: 31 March 2023; Label: Secret; Formats: 2xLP, digital download	—	—	—
Slates Live!	Released: 26 April 2024; Label: Popstock; Formats: 10", digital download	—	—	—
Grotesque (After the Gramme) Live!	Released: 25 October 2024; Label: Popstock; Formats: CD, LP, MC, digital download	—	—	—
Singles Live Vol. One 1978–81	Released: 9 May 2025; Label: Popstock; Formats: CD, LP, digital download	—	25	—
"—" denotes releases that did not chart or were not released in that territory.

== Compilation albums ==
Title	Album details	Peak chart positions	
Title	Album details	UK	UK Indie
77–Early Years–79	Released: September 1981; Label: Step-Forward; Formats: LP	—	6
Hip Priest and Kamerads	Released: March 1985; Label: Situation Two; Formats: LP, MC	—	4
The Fall	Released: April 1986; Label: PVC; Formats: LP; US-only release	—	—
Nord-West Gas	Released: 1986; Label: FünfUndVierzig; Formats: LP; Germany-only release	—	—
Palace of Swords Reversed	Released: 23 November 1987; Label: Cog Sinister; Formats: CD, LP, MC	—	1
The Domesday Pay-Off Triad-Plus!	Released: April 1987; Label: Big Time; Formats: CD; Australia and US-only release	—	—
458489 A Sides	Released: 3 September 1990; Label: Beggars Banquet; Formats: CD, LP, MC	44	24 (Note: Chart position in 2018.)
458489 B Sides	Released: 31 December 1990; Label: Beggars Banquet; Formats: 2xCD, 2xLP, MC	—	—
The Collection	Released: April 1993; Label: Castle Communications; Formats: CD	—	—
Sinister Waltz	Released: 22 January 1996; Label: Receiver; Formats: CD, LP	—	—
Fiend with a Violin	Released: 19 February 1996; Label: Receiver; Formats: CD, LP	—	—
Oswald Defence Lawyer	Released: 15 April 1996; Label: Receiver; Formats: CD, LP	—	—
The Fall – Archive Series	Released: May 1997; Label: Rialto; Formats: CD	—	—
The Less You Look, the More You Find	Released: 18 July 1997; Label: Recall 2cd; Formats: 2xCD	—	—
Oxymoron	Released: November 1997; Label: Receiver; Formats: CD	—	—
Cheetham Hill	Released: November 1997; Label: Receiver; Formats: CD	—	—
Smile... It's the Best Of	Released: March 1998; Label: Castle Communications; Formats: CD	—	—
Northern Attitude – An Alternative Selection	Released: June 1998; Label: Music Club; Formats: CD	—	—
The Peel Sessions	Released: 25 January 1999; Label: Strange Fruit; Formats: CD	—	43
A Past Gone Mad	Released: 19 April 2000; Label: Artful; Formats: CD, 2xLP	—	—
Psykick Dance Hall	Released: 7 August 2000; Label: Eagle; Formats: 3xCD	—	—
Backdrop	Released: 5 February 2001; Label: Cog Sinister; Formats: CD; Originally released as a bootleg in 1994	—	—
A World Bewitched – Best Of 1990–2000	Released: 5 February 2001; Label: Artful; Formats: 2xCD	—	—
Totally Wired – The Rough Trade Anthology	Released: 15 July 2002; Label: Castle Music; Formats: 2xCD	—	—
High Tension Line	Released: 23 September 2002; Label: Recall 2cd; Formats: 2xCD	—	—
Listening In – Lost Singles Tracks 1990–92	Released: 11 November 2002; Label: Cog Sinister; Formats: CD	—	—
Early Singles	Released: 2 December 2002; Label: Cog Sinister; Formats: CD	—	—
It's the New Thing! The Step Forward Years	Released: 31 March 2003; Label: Castle Music; Formats: CD	—	—
Words of Expectation – BBC Sessions	Released: 26 May 2003; Label: Castle Music; Formats: 2xCD	—	—
The War Against Intelligence – The Fontana Years	Released: 22 September 2003; Label: Fontana; Formats: CD	—	—
50,000 Fall Fans Can't Be Wrong – 39 Golden Greats	Released: 31 May 2004; Label: Sanctuary Midline; Formats: 2xCD	117	8
The Permanent Years – Paranoia Man in Cheap Sh*t Room	Released: 22 May 2006; Label: Fulfill; Formats: CD	—	—
I've Never Felt Better in My Life: 1979–1982	Released: 8 July 2008; Label: The Great American Music Company; Formats: CD; US-only release	—	—
Rebellious Jukebox Volume 2	Released: 28 September 2009; Label: Secret; Formats: 2xCD	—	—
Totally Wired... Another Fall Best Of	Released: 15 December 2009; Label: Secret; Formats: digital download	—	—
Rebellious Jukebox Volume 3	Released: 31 May 2010; Label: Secret; Formats: 2xCD	—	—
13 Killers	Released: 1 May 2013; Label: Secret; Formats: CD, 2xLP	—	—
White Lightning	Released: 19 April 2014; Label: Secret; Formats: LP; Record Store Day release	—	—
The Wonderful and Frightening Escape Route To...	Released: 16 June 2015; Label: Beggars Banquet; Formats: LP	—	—
Schtick: Yarbles Revisited	Released: 16 June 2015; Label: Beggars Banquet; Formats: LP	—	—
The Classical	Released: 16 April 2016; Label: Secret; Formats: LP; Record Store Day release	—	—
Best Of	Released: 18 May 2018; Label: Secret; Formats: LP	—	—
Mark's Personal Holiday Tony Tapes	Released: 22 March 2019; Label: Ozit-Morpheus; Formats: LP	—	12
"—" denotes releases that did not chart or were not released in that territory.

== Box sets ==
Title	Album details	Peak chart positions
Title	Album details	UK Indie
Box One	Released: 25 June 1990; Label: Beggars Banquet; Formats: 4xCD; Japan-only release	—
Box Two	Released: 25 June 1990; Label: Beggars Banquet; Formats: 4xCD; Japan-only release	—
The Other Side of the Fall	Released: 14 October 1996; Label: Receiver; Formats: 3xCD	—
The Rough Trade Singles Box	Released: 15 July 2002; Label: Castle Music; Formats: 5xCD	—
Time Enough at Last	Released: 28 April 2003; Label: Castle Music; Formats: 3xCD	—
Touch Sensitive... Bootleg Box Set	Released: 14 July 2003; Label: Castle Music; Formats: 5xCD	—
Rebellious Jukebox	Released: 10 November 2003; Label: Shakedown; Formats: 2xCD+DVD	—
The Complete Peel Sessions 1978–2004	Released: 25 April 2005; Label: Castle Music; Formats: 6xCD	18
The Fall Box Set 1976–2007	Released: 10 September 2007; Label: Castle Music; Formats: 5xCD	—
5 Albums	Released: 19 August 2013; Label: Beggars Banquet; Formats: 5xCD	—
The Fontana Years	Released: 25 August 2017; Label: Fontana; Formats: 6xCD	—
Singles 1978–2016	Released: 24 November 2017; Label: Cherry Red; Formats: 7xCD; Also released as a 3-CD box set titled A-Sides 1978–2016	29
58 Golden Greats	Released: 7 December 2018; Label: Cherry Red; Formats: 3xCD; Expansion of 50,000 Fall Fans Can't Be Wrong	—
"Set of Ten" – Ten Previously Unreleased Live Recordings	Released: 14 December 2018; Label: Cog Sinister; Formats: 11xCD	—
1982	Released: 25 October 2019; Label: Cherry Red; Formats: 6xCD	—
Another "Set of Ten" – Ten Previously Unreleased Live Recordings	Released: 6 December 2019; Label: Cog Sinister; Formats: 11xCD	—
The Fall Take America	Released: March 2022; Label: Cog Sinister; Formats: 12xCD	—
1970s	Released: 25 November 2022; Label: Cherry Red; Formats: 12xCD	—
"—" denotes releases that did not chart or were not released in that territory.

== Video albums ==
Title	Album details
Perverted by Language Bis	Released: 1984; Label: Ikon; Formats: VHS, Beta
VHS8489	Released: 1990; Label: Beggars Banquet; Formats: VHS
Shift-Work and Holidays	Released: 1991; Label: PolyGram Video/Cog Sinister; Formats: VHS
A Touch Sensitive – Live	Released: 8 March 2004; Label: Secret Films; Formats: DVD
Access All Areas – Volume One	Released: 18 October 2004; Label: Hip Priest; Formats: 2xDVD
Live at the Hacienda 1983–1985	Released: 25 October 2004; Label: Cherry Red Films; Formats: DVD
Access All Areas – Volume Two	Released: 15 November 2004; Label: Hip Priest; Formats: 2xDVD
Northern Cream – Fall DVD That Fights Back!	Released: 26 May 2009; Label: Ozit-Morpheus; Formats: DVD
Kicker Conspiracy – Live at the Haçienda 1983–1985	Released: June 2011; Label: Cherry Red Films; Formats: DVD
It's Not Repetition, It's Discipline	Released: 30 March 2015; Label: Dandelion; Formats: DVD

== EPs ==
Title	EP details	Peak chart positions	
Title	EP details	UK	UK Indie
Bingo-Master's Break-Out!	Released: 11 August 1978; Label: Step-Forward; Formats: 7"	—	—
Slates	Released: 27 April 1981; Label: Rough Trade; Formats: 10"	—	3
The Peel Sessions	Released: June 1987; Label: Strange Fruit; Formats: 12", MC	—	3
The Dredger	Released: 13 August 1990; Label: Cog Sinister; Formats: 12", CD	56	—
Behind the Counter	Released: 13 December 1993; Label: Cog Sinister; Formats: 2x12", 2xCD	—	—
(We Wish You) A Protein Christmas	Released: 8 December 2003; Label: Action; Formats: 2x7", CD	—	32
Rude (All the Time)	Released: 28 February 2005; Label: Hip Priest; Formats: CD	—	—
Strychnine, Vol. 2	Released: 30 September 2009; Label: Secret; Formats: digital download	—	—
The Remainderer	Released: 9 December 2013; Label: Cherry Red; Formats: 10", CD	—	31
Wise Ol' Man	Released: 19 February 2016; Label: Cherry Red; Formats: 12", CD	—	9
O-Mit	Released: 12 May 2023; Label: Cherry Red; Formats: 10", digital download	—	14
"—" denotes releases that did not chart.

== Singles ==
Title	Year	Peak chart positions			Album
Title	Year	UK	UK Indie	NZ	Album
"It's the New Thing" b/w "Various Times"	1978	—	—	—	Non-album singles
"Rowche Rumble" b/w "In My Area"	1979	—	31	—	Non-album singles
"Fiery Jack" b/w "2nd Dark Age"/"Psykick Dancehall #2"	1980	—	4	—	Non-album singles
"How I Wrote 'Elastic Man'" b/w "City Hobgoblins"	1980	—	2	—	Non-album singles
"Totally Wired" b/w "Putta Block"	1980	—	2	25	Non-album singles
"Lie Dream of a Casino Soul" b/w "Fantastic Life"	1981	—	5	17	Non-album singles
"Look, Know" b/w "I'm into C. B.!"	1982	—	4	—	Non-album singles
"Marquis Cha-Cha" b/w "Room to Live"	1982	—	—	—	Room to Live
"The Man Whose Head Expanded" b/w "Ludd Gang"	1983	119	3	35	Non-album singles
"Kicker Conspiracy" b/w "Wings"	1983	131	5	—	Non-album singles
"Oh! Brother" b/w "God Box"	1984	93	—	—	Non-album singles (later released on the cassette version of Escape Route from the Wonderful and Frightening World of The Fall)
"C.R.E.E.P." b/w "Pat-Trip Dispenser"	1984	91	—	—	Non-album singles (later released on the cassette version of Escape Route from the Wonderful and Frightening World of The Fall)
"Draygo's Guilt" (Note: This is a 12-inch release that is titled Call for Escape Room. It came with a free 7-inch single.) b/w "Clear Off"/"No Bulbs"	1984	99	—	—	Non-album singles (later released on the cassette version of Escape Route from the Wonderful and Frightening World of The Fall)
"Couldn't Get Ahead" b/w "Rollin' Dany"	1985	90	—	—	This Nation's Saving Grace (Cassette version)
"Cruiser's Creek" b/w "L.A."	1985	96	—	—	Non-album single
"Living Too Late" b/w "Hot Aftershave Bop"	1986	97	—	—	Bend Sinister (CD and cassette version)
"Mr. Pharmacist" b/w "Lucifer Over Lancashire"	1986	75	—	—	Bend Sinister
"Hey! Luciani" b/w "Entitled"	1986	59	—	—	Non-album single
"There's a Ghost in My House" b/w "Haf Found Bormann"	1987	30	—	—	The Frenz Experiment (CD version)
"Hit the North" b/w "Hit the North (Part 2)"	1987	57	—	—	The Frenz Experiment (CD version)
"Victoria" b/w "Tuff Life Booogie"	1988	35	—	—	The Frenz Experiment
"Jerusalem" b/w "Acid Priest"/"Big New Prinz"/"Wrong Place, Right Time"	1988	59	—	—	I Am Kurious Oranj
"Cab It Up!" b/w "Dead Beat Descendant"	1989	81	—	—	I Am Kurious Oranj
"Telephone Thing" b/w "British People in Hot Weather"	1990	58	—	—	Extricate
"Popcorn Double Feature" b/w "Arms Control Poseur"	1990	84	—	—	Extricate
"White Lightning" b/w "Blood Outta Stone"	1990	56	—	—	Shift-Work (UK CD and cassette version)
"High Tension Line" b/w "Xmas with Simon"	1990	97	—	—	Shift-Work (UK CD and cassette version)
"Free Range" b/w "Everything Hurtz"	1992	40	—	—	Code: Selfish
"Ed's Babe" b/w "Pumpkin Head Xscapes"/"The Knight, the Devil and Death"/"Free Ranger"	1992	83	—	—	Non-album singles
"Kimble" b/w "Gut of the Quantifier"	1993	86	—	—	Non-album singles
"Why Are People Grudgeful?" b/w "Glam-Racket"	1993	43	—	—	Non-album single (alternative version on the CD version of The Infotainment Scan)
"Behind the Counter" b/w "War"/"Cab Driver"	1993	75	—	—	Middle Class Revolt
"15 Ways" b/w "Hey! Student"/"The $500 Bottle of Wine"	1994	65	—	—	Middle Class Revolt
"The Chiselers" b/w "Chilinist"	1996	60	—	—	Non-album single
"Masquerade" b/w "Ivanhoes Two Pence"/"Spencer Must Die" (live)/"Ten Houses of Eve" (remix)	1998	69	11	—	Levitate
"Touch Sensitive" b/w "Antidote"/"Touch Sensitive" (Dance Mix)	1999	90	—	—	The Marshall Suite
"F-'oldin' Money" b/w "Perfect Day" (New Version)/"Birthday Song" (New Mix)	1999	93	—	—	The Marshall Suite
"Rude (All the Time)" b/w "I Wake Up in the City"	2001	—	—	—	Non-album singles
"Susan vs Youthclub" (Note: This release is titled The Fall vs 2003.) b/w "Janet vs Johnny"	2002	64	9	—	Non-album singles
"Theme from Sparta F.C. #2" b/w "My Ex's Classmate's Kids"	2004	66	10	—	The Real New Fall LP (Formerly Country on the Click) (US version)
"I Can Hear the Grass Grow" b/w "Clasp Hands"	2005	104	20	—	Fall Heads Roll
"Higgle-Dy Piggle-Dy" (Germany-only release) b/w "Monk Time" (by Alec Empire feat. Gary Burger)	2006	—	—	—	Non-album single
"Reformation!" b/w "Over Over"/"My Door Is Never"/"Reformation!" (edit)	2007	—	6	—	Reformation Post TLC
"Slippy Floor" b/w "Hot Cake – Part 2"	2009	—	—	—	Your Future Our Clutter
"Bury!" b/w "Cowboy Gregorie"	2010	—	—	—	Your Future Our Clutter
"Laptop Dog" b/w "Cosmo 7"/"Monocard"	2011	—	—	—	Ersatz GB
"Victrola Time" (Note: This release is titled Night of the Humerons.) b/w /"Taking Off" (live)	2012	—	—	—	Re-Mit
"Sir William Wray" b/w "Jetplane"/"Hittite Man"	2013	—	—	—	Re-Mit
"Wise Ol' Man"	2016	—	—	—	Wise Ol' Man EP
"30 Degrees"	2026	—	—	—	Post Script
"—" denotes releases that did not chart or were not released in that territory.

== See also ==
- Mark E. Smith discography
