= 4 Tunna Brix =

EP by Sonic Youth
- Released: 1990
- Recorded: 1988
- Genre: Alternative rock
- Label: Goofin'

Sonic Youth EP chronology
Master-Dik (1987)	4 Tunna Brix (1990)	Whores Moaning (1993)

Professional ratings
Review scores
Source	Rating
AllMusic	2.5/5 stars

4 Tunna Brix is an EP by the alternative rock group Sonic Youth, released in 1990. It comprises four songs recorded by the BBC in 1988 for John Peel's radio programme – three covers of the Fall ("My New House", "Rowche Rumble" and "Psycho Mafia") and one ("Victoria") of the Kinks (the latter had also been covered by the Fall). The title referenced former Fall guitarist Brix Smith.

== Track listing ==
1. "My New House" (Mark E. Smith)
2. "Rowche Rumble" (Craig Scanlon, Steve Hanley, Mark E. Smith)
3. "Psycho Mafia" (Mark E. Smith, Tony Friel)
4. "Victoria" (Ray Davies)
