= Mark E. Smith discography =

Mark E. Smith discography contains all of the works associated with the English singer and songwriter Mark E. Smith. Although primarily known as the leader of the post-punk band The Fall, he released some solo work and collaborated on projects with several other bands and musicians.

== Solo ==
- The Post Nearly Man (1998), Artful
- Pander Panda Panzer (2002), Action Records

== Von Südenfed ==
Albums

- Tromatic Reflexxions (2007), Domino

Singles

- "Fledermaus Can't Get It" (2007), Domino
- "The Rhinohead/Slow Down Ronnie" (2007), Domino

== Mark E. Smith and Ed Blaney ==
Albums

- Smith and Blaney (2008), Voiceprint
- The Train Part Three (2009), Voiceprint
- The Train Part 4 (2019), Cog Sinister

Singles

- "Real Good Time Together" (2008), Voiceprint
- "Transfusion" (2009), Voiceprint

== Collaborations ==
The Clint Boon Experience

- "You Can't Keep a Good Man Down" single (1999)

Coldcut

- What's That Noise album (1989) – "I'm in Deep"

Edwyn Collins

- I'm Not Following You (1996), Setanta – "Seventies Night"

D.O.S.E. featuring Mark E. Smith

- "Plug Myself In" (1996), Coliseum – 2 CDs, 12" vinyl

Ghostigital

- Iceland Airwaves '05 V/A album (2005), Iceland Airwaves – "Not Clean" (also released as a single)

Gorillaz

- Glitter Freeze "Plastic Beach" (2010), co-writer with Gorillaz.
- Delirium The Mountain (2026), co-writer with Gorillaz

INCH featuring Mark E. Smith

- INCH EP (1999), Regal

Inspiral Carpets feat. Mark E Smith

- I Want You (1994), Mute

Jon the Postman

- Puerile album – Intro to "Louie Louie"

Long Fin Killie

- "Heads of Dead Surfers" single (1995) – "Heads of Dead Surfers"

Mouse on Mars

- Wipe That Sound EP (2004), Sonig – "Cut the Gain", "Sound City"
- 21 Again album (2014) – "21 Again"

Shuttleworth

- "England's Heartbeat" (2010) – Shuttleworth feat. Mark E. Smith

Jan St. Werner

- Molocular Meditation (2020), Editions Mego – "Molocular Meditation", "Back to Animals", "VS Canceled"

Tackhead

- "Dangerous Sex" single (1989) – "Repetition"
