= Seminal Live =

Studio album / Live album by the Fall
- Released: 26 June 1989
- Recorded: 1988 in Vienna and Manchester, 1989 in Rochdale and Edinburgh
- Genre: Post-punk
- Length: 41:13 (vinyl); 59:59 (CD/cassette)
- Label: Beggars Banquet
- Producers: Shan Hira; Mark E. Smith; Ian Broudie

The Fall chronology
I Am Kurious Oranj (1988)	Seminal Live (1989)	Extricate (1990)

Seminal Live is a 1989 album by the English rock band the Fall, recorded partly in the studio and partly at live performances in 1988. The album was the last to be released by the group through Beggars Banquet Records, and as such is often seen as a "contractual obligation" album. It was also the last Fall album to feature Brix Smith, former wife of the lead singer Mark E. Smith, until her return for 1995's Cerebral Caustic.

The studio recordings on Seminal Live were all new songs and make up the first five tracks of the album—side one on the original vinyl release. The live recordings on side two, meanwhile, are all versions of previously released tracks.

In a 2006 interview with The Pseud Mag fanzine, keyboardist Marcia Schofield called Seminal Live "the worst piece of shit I have ever worked on [...] Talk about exhausted and out of ideas. It was one of those-we've just come off tour and have to make a record so what shit covers can we bung on it?-album".

== Reception ==
Professional ratings
Review scores
Source	Rating
AllMusic	2/5 stars
Alternative Press	favourable
Hi-Fi News & Record Review	A:1
NME	6/10
Record Mirror	3/5

Critical response to the album was somewhat mixed. Andrew Collins, writing in the NME, suggests: "Seminal Live is worse than an intellectual letdown, it's a tease". The songs themselves also provoked a variety of responses from journalists. Jason Pettigrew of the Alternative Press writes: "For pure weirdness value, look no further than "Mollusc in Tyrol", a musique concrete rave-up on top of a Neubauten "Yu-Gung" rhythm track that's been buried alive". A reviewer for the Record Mirror, by contrast, says: "'Mollusc In Tyrol' is a totally unbearable drone which should never have found its way from the vaults". Jim Sullivan, for The Boston Globe, also singled out "Mollusc in Tyrol" as a "monotonous irritant", but stated that if the album "doesn't rank with the overall best of the Fall, it is a holding pattern that should neatly please and agitate".

== Track listing ==
Vinyl version

Side one (Seminal)
No.	Title	Writer(s)	Length
1.	"Dead Beat Descendant"	Mark E. Smith, Brix Smith	2:25
2.	"Pinball Machine"	Lonnie Irving	2:53
3.	"H.O.W."	M. Smith	4:18
4.	"Squid Law"	M. Smith, Craig Scanlon, Steve Hanley	3:42
5.	"Mollusc in Tyrol"	M. Smith, Craig Leon	5:10

- a home recording of Mark E. Smith singing over "Donkeys Bearing Cups" from Craig Leon's 1981 Nommos album

Side two (Live)
No.	Title	Writer(s)	Length
1.	"2 × 4"	M. Smith, B. Smith	3:55
2.	"Elf Prefix"/"L.A."	M. Smith, B. Smith	5:02
3.	"Victoria"	Ray Davies	2:57
4.	"Pay Your Rates"	M. Smith	3:52
5.	"Introduction"/"Cruisers Creek"	M. Smith, B. Smith	6:58
Total length:			41:13

CD/cassette version
No.	Title	Writer(s)	Length
1.	"Dead Beat Descendant"	M. Smith, B. Smith	2:25
2.	"Pinball Machine"	Irving	2:53
3.	"H.O.W."	M. Smith	4:18
4.	"Squid Law"	M. Smith, Scanlon, Hanley	3:42
5.	"Mollusc in Tyrol"	M. Smith, Leon	5:10
6.	"Kurious Oranj" (live)	M. Smith, Hanley, Simon Wolstencroft	5:59
7.	"Frenz" (live)	M. Smith	5:23
8.	"Hit the North" (live)	M. Smith, Simon Rogers, B. Smith	3:12
9.	"2 × 4" (live)	M. Smith, B. Smith	3:55
10.	"Elf Prefix"/"L.A." (live)	M. Smith, B. Smith	5:02
11.	"Victoria" (live)	Davies	2:57
12.	"Pay Your Rates" (live)	M. Smith	3:52
13.	"Introduction"/"Cruisers Creek" (live)	M. Smith, B. Smith	6:58
14.	"In These Times" (live)	M. Smith	4:12
Total length:			59:59

- All additional tracks are further live recordings
- Tracks 8–10, 12 and 14 recorded at the Arena, Vienna in Austria on 16 April 1988.
- Tracks 6, 7, and 11 recorded at an unknown venue, possibly in Manchester, in 1988. Track 13 recorded at Manchester G-Mex in 1986; Bill Grundy introduced the band onstage and his intro was used on the album.

== Personnel ==
The Fall

- Mark E. Smith – vocals, violin on "Elf Prefix"
- Brix Smith – guitar and backing vocals on "Dead Beat Descendent", "Squid Law" and live tracks only
- Craig Scanlon – guitar, backing vocals
- Steve Hanley – bass guitar, banjo on "Pinball Machine"
- Simon Wolstencroft – drums
- Marcia Schofield – keyboards, backing vocals

with:

- Bill Grundy – voice on "Introduction" (uncredited)

Technical

- Shan Hira – production (all studio tracks; "Frenz")
- Mark E. Smith – production (all studio tracks; all live tracks, except "Kurious Oranj" and "Frenz")
- Ian Broudie – production ("Kurious Oranj")
- Dian Barton – engineering and live mixing (except "Kurious Oranj" and "Frenz")
- S.P. – cover art
