= Totale's Turns =

Totale's Turns (It's Now or Never)

Live album by The Fall
- Released: 5 May 1980
- Recorded: 27 October 1979 – 29 February 1980
- Genre: Post-punk
- Length: 43:05
- Label: Rough Trade

The Fall chronology
Dragnet (1979)	Totale's Turns (It's Now or Never) (1980)	Grotesque (After the Gramme) (1980)

Totale's Turns (It's Now or Never) is a (mostly) live album by the English post-punk band the Fall, released on 5 May 1980.

== Recording and release ==
The first of the band's many live and part-live albums, it was mostly recorded at gigs in the north of England, but the track "New Puritan" was recorded at Mark E. Smith's home and "That Man" is a studio recording, an outtake from the recording sessions for the "Fiery Jack" single.

Rather than record themselves in front of a receptive home crowd, the Fall chose to use recordings made in working men's clubs and other less obvious settings; Side 1 of the album was recorded at a leisure centre near Doncaster while the first two tracks on Side 2 are from a February 1980 gig in Bradford. It is clear on the recording that the reception the band received ranged from indifferent to hostile, the enmity between band and audience evident from Smith's introductory statement "The difference between you and us is that we have brains". Friction within the band is also apparent, with Smith apparently chastising one of the musicians during "No Xmas for John Quays" with "Will you fuckin' get it together instead of showing off".

Smith said of the album in his 2008 book Renegade:

Nobody wanted to release it, because nobody played the sort of venues that you hear on it – places like Doncaster and Preston. The North was out of bounds; it might as well have been another country. We just pieced a load of tapes together. In the band's eyes it was commercial suicide releasing this dirge; they couldn't see the soul that lay behind it. That's musicians for you.

The album was released on 5 May 1980, the band's first release after signing to Rough Trade Records.

== Reception ==
Professional ratings
Review scores
Source	Rating
AllMusic	3/5 stars
The Austin Chronicle	2/5 stars
Robert Christgau	B
Q	3/5 stars
Sounds	5/5 stars

Dave McCullough in Sounds gave the album a five star rating, calling the band "a living reminder of the failure of Punk and the almost solitary exponents of the directions in which it should have gone". Robert Christgau gave the album a B rating, describing himself as "a sucker for the overall sound, maybe even the attitude". AllMusic reviewer Ned Raggett gave the album three stars, stating that it saw the band in "a hilariously aggressive mood", and delivering "some brilliant performances". Martin Longley, in a 1998 review, gave it three stars, calling it "a terse, brittle classic of cranky Mark E. Smith ranting". A 2002 review of the reissued album was given two stars by Marc Savlov in The Austin Chronicle, describing it as "live with God-awful acoustics and utter crap recording that renders it barely there at the best moments". Trouser Press described the album as "Jagged, largely recitative and nearly oblivious to musical convention, Smith's witty repartee carries the show as the band lurches and grunts along noisily."

The album was chosen by Luke Haines in 2011 as one of his thirteen favourite albums.

The album topped the UK Independent Chart in 1980, spending a total of 31 weeks on the chart.

== Reissues ==
The album has been issued on CD several times, in 1992 by Dojo, in 1998 and 2004 by Castle Communications, and in 2017 by Westworld Recordings. The 2004 Castle reissue included the Fall's third Peel session as bonus tracks. It was reissued on vinyl in 2004 by Earmark, and in 2017 by Let Them Eat Vinyl.

== Track listing ==
Side A
No.	Title	Writer(s)	Length
1.	"Intro"	Mark E. Smith	0:46
2.	"Fiery Jack"	Smith, Marc Riley, Steve Hanley, Craig Scanlon	4:27
3.	"Rowche Rumble"	Smith, Riley, Scanlon	4:50
4.	"Muzorewi's Daughter"	Smith, Kay Carroll	3:42
5.	"In My Area"	Smith, Yvonne Pawlett, Riley, Scanlon	4:31
6.	"Choc Stock"	Smith, Scanlon	2:33

Side B
No.	Title	Writer(s)	Length
7.	"Spector Vs. Rector 2"	Smith, Mike Leigh, Scanlon, Hanley	5:54
8.	"Cary Grant's Wedding"	The Fall	3:35
9.	"That Man" (Studio recording)	Smith, Riley, Scanlon	1:43
10.	"New Puritan" (Home Demo recording)	Smith, Scanlon, Riley, Hanley	3:21
11.	"No Xmas for John Quays"	Smith	7:43

2004 reissue bonus tracks
No.	Title	Writer(s)	Length
12.	"The Container Drivers" (BBC Session)	Smith, Scanlon, Riley, Hanley, Paul Hanley	3:40
13.	"Jawbone and the Air-Rifle" (BBC Session)	The Fall	3:24
14.	"New Puritan" (BBC Session)	Smith, Scanlon, Riley, Hanley	7:13
15.	"New Face in Hell" (BBC Session)	Smith, Scanlon, Riley, Hanley	5:05

== Recording notes ==
- Tracks 1–6: recorded live at Bircoats Leisure Centre, Doncaster, 27 October 1979
- Tracks 7 and 8: recorded live at Palm Cove, Bradford, 29 February 1980
- Track 9: studio outtake from the "Fiery Jack" sessions; recorded in Wales, September 1979
- Track 10: home demo recording from Mark E. Smith's house in Prestwich
- Track 11: recorded live at The Warehouse, Preston, 22 November 1979
- Tracks 12–15: John Peel Session; recorded 16 September 1980

== Personnel ==
The Fall

- Mark E. Smith – vocals
- Marc Riley – guitar, keyboards
- Craig Scanlon – guitar
- Steve Hanley – bass
- Mike Leigh – drums

Additional musicians

- Paul Hanley – drums (tracks 12–15)
