= Dragnet (album) =

Studio album by the Fall
- Released: 26 October 1979
- Recorded: 2–4 August 1979
- Studio: Cargo Studios, Rochdale, England
- Genre: Post-punk
- Length: 45:42
- Label: Step-Forward
- Producer: The Fall; Grant Showbiz

The Fall chronology
Live at the Witch Trials (1979)	Dragnet (1979)	Totale's Turns (It's Now or Never) (1980)

Dragnet is the second studio album by English post-punk band the Fall. It was released on 26 October 1979 through Step-Forward Records, less than eight months after its predecessor, Live at the Witch Trials. Dragnet established, at this early stage, two key patterns characteristic of the group's future: that of high productivity and a regular turnover of group members.

== Background and recording ==
Only Mark E. Smith and Marc Riley remained in the lineup from the band's debut album, Live at the Witch Trials. Drummer Karl Burns left soon after recording that album and was replaced by Mike Leigh, while founder member Martin Bramah quit mid-tour in April 1979, when some of the material intended for the second album had already been written. Smith quickly recruited guitarist Craig Scanlon and bassist Steve Hanley, who were Fall roadies, members of support band Staff 9 and friends of Marc Riley; both were aged just 18 and 19, respectively, when they joined the group, and went on to form the Fall's musical backbone until the mid-1990s. Riley moved from bass to guitar (his first instrument), and also started to play keyboards following Yvonne Pawlett's departure after recording the "Rowche Rumble" single.

The new album was recorded during 2–4 August 1979. Dragnet's sound was notably muddy and lo-fi – Riley has claimed that this was a deliberate contrast to the sharp, clean sound of Live at the Witch Trials, while Smith claimed that the recording studio was so appalled by the sound that the group were asked to remove the studio's name from the album sleeve. Bramah did not receive credit for his contributions, and there were several songs that were altered heavily by the group after his departure. Among these was "Before the Moon Falls", which had as its musical backing a song that later became the basis for the Blue Orchids' "Work".

The album is somewhat self-referential lyrically, with several songs referencing the music industry. At least two tracks, "Printhead" and "Your Heart Out", quote or paraphrase reviews of the band's live shows. "Printhead" even verifies this fact within its own lyrics. "Dice Man" takes its title from the novel The Dice Man by Luke Rhinehart. "Spectre Vs Rector" was, according to Pitchfork's Jason Heller, an answer to "Music Scene" on Live at the Witch Trials, commenting that "its sludge and subliminal menace practically invented post-rock as an afterthought". "Muzorewi's Daughter", with its "slow, relentless acceleration...punctuated by Smith's shrieks", was described as "one of the most terrifying Fall songs of them all".

Dragnet would be the Fall's final album for Miles Copeland III's Step-Forward label; the band signed with Rough Trade Records in early 1980.

== Reception ==
Professional ratings
Review scores
Source	Rating
AllMusic	3.5/5 stars
Mojo	4/5 stars
Pitchfork	8.7/10
Q	4/5 stars
Record Collector	4/5 stars
Record Mirror	5/5 stars
The Rolling Stone Album Guide	4/5 stars
Sounds	5/5 stars
Spin Alternative Record Guide	8/10
Uncut	8/10

Reviews for Dragnet have been generally favourable. Sounds critic Dave McCullough wrote that "The Fall have never been stronger, the sound is more concise, more assured and Mark Smith's writing has an aura of confidence and direction to it." In his review for Record Mirror, Chris Westwood said that the album's "clattering demo-tape production" effectively draws attention to the songs' lyrics: "Odd lines of vocal stick, and it's the odd lines that count." Dragnet was ranked the 35th-best album of 1979 by NME.

David Quantick, reviewing the 1999 reissue for Q, found that Dragnet contains some of Smith's best songs and noted its crude production, remarking that the album sounds as if it "was recorded on a home cassette recorder in a multi-storey car park." Nicholas Collias, reviewing the 2004 reissue for the Boise Weekly, viewed the music on the album as providing "the blueprint for The Fall's golden age of the early 1980s: paper-thin rockabilly with tinny, meandering guitars and lilting keyboards." In his review of the 2016 reissue, Jason Heller of Pitchfork described the album as "weighty" and "overwhelmingly dense". Vulture's Stuart Berman cited Dragnet as "the first album where the Fall tap into their powers of hypnosis, locking into the sinister back-alley prowl of 'Before the Moon Falls' and the Morse code, cowbell-clanged pummel of 'Spectre vs Rector,' all while Smith transcends from the realm of mere punk carnival barker to oracle of the underground." In 2018, Billboard writer Geeta Dayal ranked it the Fall's fourth-best album.

Stereogum's Robert Ham was less enthusiastic about Dragnet, and felt that "the songs are playful and feel like they were constructed just a few minutes before the tape started rolling, but that doesn't suit this version of The Fall one bit", criticising its lack of "tension". Trouser Press opined that Dragnet is "not one of The Fall's best efforts, but contains at least two classic numbers, 'Spectre vs. Rector' and 'A Figure Walks'." AllMusic reviewer Ned Raggett noted that while several tracks "come across as Fall-by-numbers (even then, already better than plenty of other bands)", the album nonetheless includes "thorough standouts" such as "Spectre Vs Rector".

== Reissues ==
In 2004, Castle Music reissued the album with, for the first time, remastered audio from the original master tapes. The reissue included the contemporaneous singles "Rowche Rumble" and "Fiery Jack" (and the singles' B-sides), but also previously unheard alternate takes and breakdowns from the "Rowche Rumble" recording sessions. Dragnet was reissued on vinyl in 2016 on the Superior Viaduct label.

== Track listing ==
All tracks arranged by the Fall except "Printhead" (arranged by the Fall and Martin Bramah).

Side A
No.	Title	Writer(s)	Length
1.	"Psykick Dancehall"	Mark E. Smith, Marc Riley, Craig Scanlon	3:48
2.	"A Figure Walks"	Smith	6:08
3.	"Printhead"	Smith	3:15
4.	"Dice Man"	Smith, Riley, Scanlon	1:45
5.	"Before the Moon Falls"	Smith, Riley, Scanlon, Steve Hanley, Mike Leigh	4:31
6.	"Your Heart Out"	Smith, Riley, Scanlon	3:07

Side B
No.	Title	Writer(s)	Length
1.	"Muzorewi's Daughter"	Smith, Kay Carroll	3:43
2.	"Flat of Angles"	Smith, Riley, Scanlon, Hanley, Leigh	4:55
3.	"Choc-Stock"	Smith, Scanlon	2:37
4.	"Spectre Vs. Rector"	Smith, Riley, Scanlon, Hanley, Leigh	7:56
5.	"Put Away"	Smith	3:26
Total length:			45:42

Bonus tracks on the 2002 (Dragnet +) and 2004 reissues
No.	Title	Writer(s)	Length
12.	"Rowche Rumble" (single A-side)	Smith, Riley, Scanlon	4:01
13.	"In My Area" (single B-side)	Smith, Riley, Scanlon, Yvonne Pawlett	4:05
14.	"Fiery Jack" (single A-side)	Smith, Riley, Scanlon, Hanley, Leigh	4:43
15.	"2nd Dark Age" (single B-side)	Smith, Riley, Scanlon, Hanley, Leigh	1:59
16.	"Psykick Dancehall (No. 2)" (single B-side)	Smith, Riley, Scanlon	3:26
Total length:			63:56

Additional bonus tracks on the 2004 reissue
No.	Title	Length
17.	"Rowche Rumble" (take 2)	4:05
18.	"Rowche Rumble" (take 3)	0:33
19.	"Rowche Rumble" (take 4)	3:53
20.	"Rowche Rumble" (take 5)	1:35
21.	"In My Area" (take 1)	0:48
22.	"In My Area" (take 2)	5:06
Total length:		79:56

== Personnel ==
The Fall

- Mark E. Smith – vocals, electric piano, kazoo, tape
- Steve Hanley – bass guitar, backing vocals
- Marc Riley – guitar, acoustic guitar, backing vocals
- Craig Scanlon – guitar, electric piano, kazoo, tape (credited as "Craig Scanlan")
- Mike Leigh – drums

Additional musicians

- Kay Carroll – backing vocals (credited as "Mrs. Horace Sullivan")
- Yvonne Pawlett – keyboards ("Rowche Rumble" and "In My Area")

Technical

- The Fall – production (including "Rowche Rumble" and "Fiery Jack" single tracks)
- Grant Showbiz – production
- John Brierley – engineering
- Oz McCormick – production ("Rowche Rumble" single tracks)
- Geoff Travis – production ("Fiery Jack" single tracks)
- Mayo Thompson – production ("Fiery Jack" single tracks)
- Tina Prior – front cover
- Brendan Jackson – photography
- Mark E. Smith – back cover, insert

== Sources ==
- Hanley, Paul. Have a Bleedin Guess: The Story of Hex Enduction Hour. Pontefract: Route Publishing, 2020. ISBN 978-1-901927-80-1
- Pringle, Steve. You Must Get Them All: The Fall on Record. London: Route Publishing, 2022. ISBN 978-1-9019-2788-7
