= The Remainderer =

EP by the Fall
- Released: 9 November 2013
- Recorded: 2013
- Genre: Post-punk
- Length: 26:46 (CD)
- Label: Cherry Red
- Producer: Mark E. Smith; Simon Archer

The Fall chronology
Re-Mit (2013)	The Remainderer (2013)	Sub-Lingual Tablet (2015)

The Remainderer is an EP by the Fall, released on 9 November 2013. It has five new songs by the group and a medley of two Gene Vincent covers, "Say Mama" and "Race With the Devil". The title track was previously played live. "Race with the Devil" is not a new recording, but a live performance recorded at the John Peel 50th-anniversary concert back in 1989 with the Extricate lineup; this recording had previously appeared on The Fall Red Box Set 1976-2007. The last song, "Touchy Pad" features Tamsin Middleton of Manchester band Mr Heart on vocals. The release was explained as a bridging point by the record company. The vinyl version features earlier mixes that differ from the CD. The release was followed by a number of live-shows.

== Critical reaction ==
Professional ratings
Aggregate scores
Source	Rating
Metacritic	73/100
Review scores
Source	Rating
AllMusic	3.5/5 stars
God Is in the TV	4/5 stars
The Line of Best Fit	7.5/10
NME	3.5/5 stars
Pitchfork	6.9/10

The Remainderer was positively received, receiving an 73/100 score at Metacritic.com.

The Quietus described the title track as "full of mischief and malevolence" and the rest of the EP as "answering the call of the weird". Pitchfork noted the longevity of the line-up as "an encouraging sign that stability has yet to ossify into stagnation with this ongoing iteration of the band, who formidably exercise their elasticity over the course of these six wildly divergent tracks". The Line of Best Fit commented that the EP "isn’t necessarily consistently solid, but it’s decidedly close. Fundamentally though it’s reaffirmation of their aptitude for quantity and quality". NME found the EP to "sound like someone’s brought Elvis back to life".

== Track listing ==
No.	Title	Writer(s)	Length
1.	"The Remainderer"	Mark E. Smith	4:34
2.	"Amorator!"	Smith, Keiron Melling	3:24
3.	"Mister Rode"	Smith, Melling, Dave Spurr, Peter Greenway	6:39
4.	"Rememberance R"	Smith, Melling, Spurr	6:09
5.	"Say Mama" / "Race with the Devil (live)"	John Meeks, Johnny Earl / Gene Vincent, Tex Davis	3:07
6.	"Touchy Pad"	Smith, Elena Poulou	2:25

== Personnel ==
The Fall

- Mark E. Smith – vocals, production
- Elena Poulou – keyboards
- Peter Greenway – guitar
- Dave Spurr – bass
- Keiron Melling – drums

Additional personnel

- Daren Garratt – drums on "The Remainderer", "Amorator!", "Mister Rode" and "Say Mama" (uncredited)
- Simon "Ding" Archer – production, voice on "Rememberance R"
- Tamsin Middleton – vocals on "Touchy Pad"
- Martin Bramah – guitar on "Race With The Devil" (uncredited)
- Craig Scanlon – guitar on "Race With The Devil" (uncredited)
- Steve Hanley – bass on "Race With The Devil" (uncredited)
- Marcia Schofield – keyboards on "Race With The Devil" (uncredited)
- Simon Wolstencroft – drums on "Race With The Devil" (uncredited)
