= I Am Kurious Oranj =

Studio album by The Fall
- Released: 31 October 1988
- Recorded: Mid–late 1988 at: Suite 16 Studios, Rochdale, England; King's Theatre, Edinburgh, Scotland
- Genre: Post-punk; alternative rock; art rock
- Length: 56:54
- Label: Beggars Banquet
- Producer: Ian Broudie; Mark E. Smith

The Fall chronology
| The Frenz Experiment (1988) | I Am Kurious Oranj (1988) | Seminal Live (1989) |

Singles from I Am Kurious Oranj
- 1. "Jerusalem/Big New Prinz" Released: 11 November 1988; 2. "Cab It Up" Released: 5 June 1989

I Am Kurious Oranj is the eleventh studio album by the English post-punk band the Fall. It was released on 31 October 1988 through record label Beggars Banquet.

The album's release came at the end of a relatively successful year for the group, which had also seen the release of an "accessible" album, The Frenz Experiment, and a handful of singles in the UK charts. However, there was internal strife within the band; Mark E. Smith was increasingly dependent on alcohol and speed, and his marriage to Fall lead guitarist, songwriter and vocalist Brix Smith was coming to an end. Although she wrote many of the most acclaimed songs on the album, including "Overture From Kurious Oranj", "Van Plague?" and "Bad News Girl", she was excluded from the writing and publishing credits.

I Am Kurious Oranj was intended as the soundtrack for the ballet I Am Curious, Orange, a collaboration with the dancer Michael Clark. The music was mostly pre-written by Brix Smith and bassist Steve Hanley. A live version was recorded during an Edinburgh Festival performance of the ballet, and issued in 2000 as I Am as Pure as Oranj.

== Background ==
I Am Kurious Oranj was intended as the soundtrack for the ballet I Am Curious, Orange, produced by contemporary dance group Michael Clark & Company, and loosely based on the 300th anniversary of William of Orange's ascension to the English throne. The album combines studio recordings with tracks recorded live during performances in Edinburgh in August 1988.

The opening track "New Big Prinz" (as well as its alternative version, "Big New Priest") is lyrically based on "Hip Priest" from the group's 1982 album Hex Enduction Hour; the original track was also used in the ballet as a backing tape. "Jerusalem" is an adaptation of William Blake's hymn using Hubert Parry's original music (although Parry does not appear in the credits). "Last Nacht" is a remix of "Bremen Nacht" from the group's previous album, The Frenz Experiment.

"Dead Beat Descendant" was written for the ballet and performed live, but did not make the album. It was later re-recorded and released as a track on the Seminal Live compilation.

I Am Kurious Oranj's title is derived from Swedish director Vilgot Sjöman's films I Am Curious (Yellow) (1967) and I Am Curious (Blue) (1968). It appears as I Am Kurious, Oranj on some packaging formats.

== Critical reception ==
Professional ratings
Review scores
| Source | Rating |
|---|---|
| AllMusic | 2.5/5 stars |
| Robert Christgau | A− |
| NME | 8/10 |
| The Village Voice | favourable |

I Am Kurious Oranj was critically well received at the time. NME wrote "[The Fall have] retained the power to surprise, to provoke and occasionally outrage that only the Smiths could pretend to possess in the '80s." A later review of the album by AllMusic, however, is more indifferent, opining, "As a cohesive Fall album it fails [...] I Am Kurious Oranj would have been more interesting to see than hear."

== Track listing ==
As with other Fall albums released through Beggars Banquet Records, I Am Kurious Oranj featured a different track listing across the various formats on which it was originally released. In addition to extra tracks "Guide Me Soft" and "Big New Priest", the UK CD featured several alternative and extended versions of songs (tracks 3, 5, 7, 8 and 12). In 2013, Beggars remastered and reissued the album on CD as a part of the 5 Albums box set; the new edition used the CD mixes sequenced according to the vinyl track order, with extra tracks and alternate vinyl mixes added as bonus tracks.

=== Original UK CD/cassette version ===
| No. | Title | Writer(s) | Length |
|---|---|---|---|
| 1. | "New Big Prinz" | Mark E. Smith, Craig Scanlon, Steve Hanley, Marcia Schofield | 3:25 |
| 2. | "Overture from 'I Am Curious, Orange'" | Brix Smith | 2:48 |
| 3. | "Dog Is Life/Jerusalem" | M. Smith, William Blake | 8:54 |
| 4. | "Kurious Oranj" | M. Smith, Hanley, Simon Wolstencroft | 6:20 |
| 5. | "Wrong Place, Right Time" | M. Smith | 2:52 |
| 6. | "Guide Me Soft" | M. Smith | 2:15 |
| 7. | "C.D. Win Fall 2088 AD" | M. Smith, Schofield | 4:41 |
| 8. | "Yes, O Yes" | M. Smith, B. Smith | 3:25 |
| 9. | "Van Plague?" | M. Smith, B. Smith | 4:56 |
| 10. | "Bad News Girl" | M. Smith, B. Smith | 5:22 |
| 11. | "Cab It Up!" | M. Smith | 4:54 |
| 12. | "Last Nacht" | M. Smith, Simon Rogers | 3:56 |
| 13. | "Big New Priest" | M. Smith, Scanlon, Hanley, Schofield | 3:08 |
| Total length: | | | 56:54 |

- The CD versions of tracks 3, 5, 6 and 7 are live versions from performances of the I Am Curious, Orange ballet at King's Theatre, Edinburgh in August 1988.

Note: "Van Plague?" is listed as "Van Plague" on the cassette edition.

=== Vinyl version (also original US CD/cassette version) ===
Side one
| No. | Title | Writer(s) | Length |
|---|---|---|---|
| 1. | "New Big Prinz" | M. Smith, Scanlon, Hanley, Schofield | 3:20 |
| 2. | "Overture from 'I Am Curious Orange'" | B. Smith | 2:48 |
| 3. | "Dog Is Life/Jerusalem" | M. Smith, Blake | 7:20 |
| 4. | "Kurious Oranj" | M. Smith, Hanley, Wolstencroft | 6:18 |
| 5. | "Wrong Place, Right Time" | M. Smith | 2:54 |

Side two
| No. | Title | Writer(s) | Length |
|---|---|---|---|
| 1. | "Win Fall C.D. 2080" | M. Smith, Schofield | 2:40 |
| 2. | "Yes, O Yes" | M. Smith, B. Smith | 3:34 |
| 3. | "Van Plague?" | M. Smith, B. Smith | 4:54 |
| 4. | "Bad News Girl" | M. Smith, B. Smith | 5:19 |
| 5. | "Cab It Up!" | M. Smith | 4:53 |
| 6. | "Last Nacht" (excerpt; unlisted on the album's sleeve) | M. Smith, Rogers | 1:04 |
| Total length: | | | 45:04 |

Note: "New Big Prinz" is misspelled as "New Big Prize" on the record label.

=== 2013 CD (5 Albums box set) ===
| No. | Title | Writer(s) | Length |
|---|---|---|---|
| 1. | "New Big Prinz" | M. Smith, Scanlon, Hanley, Schofield | 3:26 |
| 2. | "Overture from 'I Am Curious, Orange'" | B. Smith | 2:48 |
| 3. | "Dog Is Life/Jerusalem" | M. Smith, Blake | 8:54 |
| 4. | "Kurious Oranj" | M. Smith, Hanley, Wolstencroft | 6:19 |
| 5. | "Wrong Place, Right Time" | M. Smith | 2:52 |
| 6. | "C.D. Win Fall 2088 AD" | M. Smith, Schofield | 4:43 |
| 7. | "Yes, Oh Yes" | M. Smith, B. Smith | 3:24 |
| 8. | "Van Plague?" | M. Smith, B. Smith | 4:54 |
| 9. | "Bad News Girl" | M. Smith, B. Smith | 5:20 |
| 10. | "Cab It Up!" | M. Smith | 4:55 |
| 11. | "Last Nacht" (excerpt) | M. Smith, Rogers | 1:05 |

Bonus tracks
| No. | Title | Writer(s) | Length |
|---|---|---|---|
| 12. | "Dog Is Life / Jerusalem" (vinyl mix) | M. Smith, Blake | 7:24 |
| 13. | "Wrong Place, Right Time" (vinyl mix) | M. Smith | 2:45 |
| 14. | "Guide Me Soft" | M. Smith | 2:17 |
| 15. | "Win Fall C.D. 2080" (vinyl version) | M. Smith, Schofield | 2:44 |
| 16. | "Yes, O Yes" (vinyl mix) | M. Smith, B. Smith | 3:23 |
| 17. | "Last Nacht" | M. Smith, Rogers | 3:56 |
| 18. | "Big New Priest" | M. Smith, Scanlon, Hanley, Schofield | 3:08 |
| Total length: | | | 74:23 |

== Personnel ==
The Fall

- Mark E. Smith – lead vocals, production
- Brix Smith – electric guitar, vocals, percussion, bass guitar on track 2
- Craig Scanlon – electric guitar, acoustic guitar
- Steve Hanley – bass guitar
- Simon Wolstencroft – drums
- Marcia Schofield – keyboards, percussion

Technical

- Ian Broudie – production
- Cenzo Townshend – engineering
- Chris Jones – engineering
- Dian Barton – engineering
- Stuart Hawkes – mastering
- Kevin Cummins – sleeve photography (band photos)
- Richard Haughton – sleeve photography (stage photos)
