= Fiery Jack =

Single by The Fall
- B-side: "2nd Dark Age"; "Psykick Dancehall #2"
- Released: January 1980
- Recorded: October 1979
- Studio: Foel Studios, Llanfair Caereinion, Wales
- Genre: Post-punk; rockabilly
- Label: Step-Forward
- Songwriters: Mark E. Smith, Craig Scanlon, Marc Riley, The Fall
- Producers: The Fall, Geoff Travis, Mayo Thompson

The Fall singles chronology
"Rowche Rumble" (1979)	"Fiery Jack" (1980)	"How I Wrote 'Elastic Man'" (1980)

"Fiery Jack" is a song by the Fall released in 1980 as their fourth single.

== Composition ==
Singer Mark E. Smith said the song was written about "the ageism thing, where people are supposed to be screwed after they're 29", directed towards middle-aged men who are "hard livers with hard livers; faces like unmade beds", and that the song was intended to represent "the people in the pubs where I go are 48 or 50, but they've got more guts than all these other preeners. In every generation, you get this core of spirit, and they never lose it."

The track is grounded by a rockabilly beat, described by journalist David Wilkinson as chosen due to its being a rhythm that would "likely have been to the taste of a middle-aged working class Mancunian in 1979". Simon Reynolds saw it as "a coruscating portrait of one of Manchester's finest sons, the hard-bitten product of five generations of industrial life...a forty-five-year-old pub stalwart who's spent three decades on the piss, ignoring the pain from his long-suffering kidneys", also speculating that Jack may be an amphetamine user.

Smith stated in a Sounds interview at the time of the single's release that Jack was "the sort of guy I can see myself as in twenty years".

== Recording and release ==
The single was recorded in October 1979 at Foel Studios in Llanfair Caereinion, Powys, Wales, and was produced with Geoff Travis and Mayo Thompson, who had accepted Smith's invitation to work on the sessions. Smith recorded the vocals for "Fiery Jack" in the studios' courtyard as he liked the echo that it created. It was released in January 1980 by Step-Forward, the band's last release on the label before moving to Rough Trade Records. As well as "Fiery Jack", the band recorded the B-side tracks "2nd Dark Age" and "Psykick Dancehall #2" (a song originally released on their Dragnet album), and "That Man", which wasn't included, but was later released on the Totale's Turns album.

The sleeve's artwork was designed by Smith's sister Suzanne, with text by Mark E. Smith which mentioned Roman Totale XVII (one of several references to this character in the band's early releases), and claiming the contents of the single were found next to Totale's remains, "the results of experiments which took place in the remote Welsh hills one autumn" and urging the reader to "never unleash it on humanity".

A live version was included on the 1980 album Totale's Turns, and the studio version has since been included on several compilations of the band's work.

== Reception ==
"Fiery Jack" was chosen as 'Single of the Week' by Sounds. According to Mick Middles the song saw the band "perfecting pomposity, the Fall jump into the rough and raw world of rockabilly with confidence in excess. 'Fiery Jack' sees the band at their painful best, a number that glides on and on and on."

The single entered the UK Independent Chart on 23 February 1980, peaking at number 4, and spent twenty weeks on the chart. "Fiery Jack" was voted by listeners to John Peel's BBC Radio 1 show at number 38 in the 1980 Festive Fifty.

== Track listing ==
Side A
No.	Title	Writer(s)	Length
1.	"Fiery Jack"	Mark E. Smith, The Fall	4:46

Side B
No.	Title	Writer(s)	Length
1.	"2nd Dark Age"	The Fall	2:00
2.	"Psykick Dancehall #2"	Craig Scanlon, Marc Riley, Mark E. Smith	3:36

== Personnel ==
- Mark E. Smith – vocals, electric piano
- Marc Riley – guitar, electric piano, vocals
- Craig Scanlon – guitar
- Steve Hanley – bass guitar, vocals
- Mike Leigh – drums, percussion
