= Sub-Lingual Tablet =

Studio album by the Fall
- Released: 11 May 2015
- Recorded: 2014–2015
- Genre: Post-punk
- Length: 50:52 (CD); 56:04 (vinyl)
- Label: Cherry Red
- Producer: Mark E. Smith

The Fall chronology
The Remainderer (2013)	Sub-Lingual Tablet (2015)	Wise Ol' Man (2016)

Sub-Lingual Tablet is the 30th studio album by English band the Fall, released in May 2015 by Cherry Red Records.

The album was originally going to be named Dedication Not Medication, but, according to Mark E. Smith, "it looked a bit like a Barclays advert". Sub-Lingual Tablet marks the first appearance of second drummer Daren Garratt as a full-time member (he previously guested on The Remainderer, uncredited). Meanwhile, "Black Roof" doesn't feature the regular Fall lineup at all; instead, the bulk of it was recorded by former members Rob Barbato and Tim Presley in the United States, with Smith adding the vocals later.

Two of the album's tracks were already released in 2014 in different versions – "Fibre Book Troll" on Modeselektor's Modeselektion Vol. 03 compilation and "Auto Chip 2014-2016" (as "Auto (2014) Chip Replace") on part-live, part-studio album Live: Uurop VIII-XII Places In Sun & Winter, Son.

== Reception ==
Professional ratings
Aggregate scores
Source	Rating
Metacritic	68/100
Review scores
Source	Rating
AllMusic	4/5 stars
Drowned in Sound	7/10
The Guardian	3/5 stars
The Line of Best Fit	8/10
Louder Than War	9/10
musicOMH	3.5/5 stars
Pitchfork	6.0/10
PopMatters	6/10
Record Collector	3/5 stars
The Skinny	4/5 stars

Michael Hann of The Guardian gave the album three stars out of five, calling it "predictable and surprising in almost equal measure"; he criticised the album for having "its share of Fall-by-numbers" but also described "Auto Chip 2014-2016" as "magnificent". Chris McCall of The Skinny said that it was "easily the [band's] best [album] since 2007's Reformation Post TLC". Drowned in Sound reviewer Benjamin Bland said that while the album contained "a series of tracks that could fit into almost any period in the band's catalogue", it included "enough genuinely high quality Fall material" to be of interest to old and new fans alike.

== Track listing ==
=== CD version ===
No.	Title	Writer(s)	Length
1.	"Venice with the Girls"	Mark E. Smith, Dave Spurr, Keiron Melling	4:11
2.	"Black Roof" (listed as "Black Door" on iTunes)	Smith, Rob Barbato, Tim Presley	1:46
3.	"Dedication Not Medication"	Smith, Spurr	4:47
4.	"First One Today"	Smith, Elena Poulou	2:45
5.	"Junger Cloth"	Smith, Spurr, Melling	4:55
6.	"Stout Man" (a reworking of "Cock in My Pocket" by Iggy and the Stooges)	Iggy Pop, James Williamson	3:15
7.	"Auto Chip 2014-2016" (listed as "Auto Chip 14-15" on iTunes)	Smith, Poulou	10:03
8.	"Pledge!"	Smith	6:32
9.	"Snazzy"	Smith, Poulou	2:29
10.	"Fibre Book Troll" (listed as "Facebook Troll" on iTunes)	Smith, Poulou, Spurr	5:59
11.	"Quit iPhone"	Smith, Spurr, Melling	4:10

=== Vinyl version ===
- The double-vinyl version was released on May 25 and contains alternate versions of several tracks, most notably longer versions of "Dedication Not Medication" and "Fibre Book Troll", and shorter versions of "Auto Chip 2014-2016" and "Pledge!"

Side A
No.	Title	Writer(s)	Length
1.	"Venice with the Girls"	Smith, Spurr, Melling	4:12
2.	"Black Roof"	Smith, Barbato, Presley	1:46
3.	"Dedication Not Medication"	Smith, Spurr	7:38

Side B
No.	Title	Writer(s)	Length
4.	"First One Today"	Smith, Poulou	2:45
5.	"Junger Cloth"	Smith, Spurr, Melling	4:55
6.	"Stout Man"	Pop, Williamson	3:17

Side C
No.	Title	Writer(s)	Length
7.	"Auto Chip 2014-2016"	Smith, Poulou	8:21
8.	"Pledge!"	Smith	4:56
9.	"Snazzy"	Smith, Poulou	2:29

Side D
No.	Title	Writer(s)	Length
10.	"Fibre Book Troll"	Smith, Poulou, Spurr	11:35
11.	"Quit iPhone"	Smith, Spurr, Melling	4:10

== Personnel ==
Credits adapted from Sub-Lingual Tablet liner notes.

The Fall

- Mark E. Smith – vocals, guitar on "First One Today", production
- Peter Greenway – guitar
- Elena Poulou – synthesizer, engineering
- David Spurr – bass guitar
- Keiron Melling – drums, engineering
- Daren Garratt – drums, percussion, backing vocals on "Auto Chip 2014-2016"

Additional personnel

- Rob Barbato – all instruments, recording and mixing on "Black Roof"
- Tim Presley – all instruments, recording and mixing on "Black Roof"
- Simon "Ding" Archer – engineering, voice on "Dedication Not Medication" (vinyl version)
- Mat Arnold – engineering
- Andy Pearce – mastering
- Ken Pearson – artwork
- Charlie Pearson – artwork

== Charts ==
Chart (2015)	Peak position
UK Albums (OCC)	31
