= Whores Moaning =

EP by Sonic Youth
- Released: February 1993
- Recorded: 1990–1992
- Genres: Alternative rock; noise rock
- Label: Geffen
- Producers: Butch Vig; Sonic Youth

Sonic Youth EP chronology
4 Tunna Brix (1990)	Whores Moaning (1993)	TV Shit (1994)

Whores Moaning (or Whore's Moaning) is an EP by Sonic Youth released in February 1993. It was released exclusively in Australia to coincide with 1993 tour dates in Australia and New Zealand. The name of the EP was a reference to Nirvana's Australian tour EP Hormoaning, released the previous year.

== Content ==
Basically consisting of the "Sugar Kane" single with some tweaking, it featured the radio edit of "Sugar Kane", "Personality Crisis" from a Sassy Magazine flexi-disc (recorded July 1990), a prototype instrumental of "Shoot" from December 1991 called "The End of the End of the Ugly", "Is It My Body" from the Sub Pop Alice Cooper tribute (recorded April 1991) and the lengthy instrumental "Tamra" from November 1991. The record was re-released in the United States on blue vinyl on April 16, 2011 for Record Store Day.

=== Packaging ===
The Kevin Kerslake cover artwork is a photocopy of one of Kurt Cobain's dolls. The back features a drawing by Cobain.

== Track listing ==
1. "Sugar Kane" (Edit) – 5:03
2. "Personality Crisis" – 3:50
3. "The End of the End of the Ugly" – 4:12
4. "Is It My Body" – 2:53
5. "Tamra" – 8:53

== Charts ==
Chart performance for Whores Moaning
Chart (1993)	Peak position
Australia (ARIA)	44
New Zealand (Recorded Music NZ)	33
