= The Frenz Experiment =

Studio album by The Fall
- Released: 29 February 1988
- Recorded: Mid–late 1987
- Studio: Abbey Road Studios, London; Brixton and Manchester
- Genre: Post-punk; alternative rock
- Length: 42:20
- Label: Beggars Banquet
- Producer: Simon Rogers; Grant Showbiz; Dian Barton

The Fall chronology
Bend Sinister (1986)	The Frenz Experiment (1988)	I Am Kurious Oranj (1988)

Singles from The Frenz Experiment
- 1. "There's a Ghost in My House" Released: 27 April 1987; 2. "Hit the North" Released: 19 October 1987; 3. "Victoria" Released: 11 January 1988

The Frenz Experiment is the tenth studio album by the English post-punk band the Fall. It was released on 29 February 1988 through record label Beggars Banquet. In October 2020, an expanded remastered edition was produced, containing singles, b-sides and other tracks recorded in the same era.

== Background ==
Smith originally intended to call the album Gene Crime Experience, until he realised that its initials are "GCE". The phrase does still feature on the back cover of the CD.

A strong similarity between "Athlete Cured" and Spinal Tap's "Tonight I'm Gonna Rock You Tonight" has been noted. In his autobiography The Big Midweek, bassist Steve Hanley confirms that the resemblance was not accidental, admitting that the group had been jamming the Spinal Tap song in soundchecks and that Mark E. Smith had decided to make use of the results -- though without any of their usual attempts to conceal origins of borrowed riffs, such as changing the tempo or musical key. Hanley also states that producer Simon Rogers had been so annoyed by the lift that he came close to walking off the project.

Guitarist Brix Smith claimed she co-wrote a number of the tracks but was largely omitted from the song writing credits.

== Release ==
The Frenz Experiment was released on 29 February 1988. It reached number 19 in the UK album chart, making it the Fall's first Top 20 album. The group promoted the release with a live appearance in HMV's Oxford Street store in London. They opened the short set with "Cab It Up!", a new song that would appear on the group's following album, I Am Kurious Oranj.

Like the group's other albums with Beggars Banquet, Frenz has a different track listing across various formats (LP, CD and cassette). A number of tracks are credited exclusively to Mark E. Smith, but the album also incorporates two cover versions (or one, depending on the format): "Victoria", originally by The Kinks, and "There's a Ghost in My House", a northern soul track first recorded by R. Dean Taylor in 1966. The Fall's version of "Victoria" was released as a single, making it to No. 35 in the British charts. The latter cover version only appears on the CD version of the album, having been issued as a single in April 1987 and reaching number 30. This was the group's highest singles chart position to date and remains so.

In October 2020, a remastered, expanded edition of the album was released on double vinyl and CD, including tracks from the singles "There's a Ghost in My House", "Hit the North" and "Victoria". The CD version also contains the Fall's cover of A Day in the Life by The Beatles, from the NME charity album Sgt. Pepper Knew My Father, and a BBC Janice Long session.

== Reception ==
Professional ratings
Review scores
Source	Rating
AllMusic	3.5/5 stars
Robert Christgau	B+
Pitchfork	7.4/10

The Frenz Experiment was generally well received by music critics. Pitchfork, in a 2000 review, gave the album a positive rating but described it as "a bit of a mixed bag. On no other record than the weak 1994 effort Middle Class Revolt do they sound more like they're on autopilot."

== Track listing ==
Original UK LP

Side one: Crime Gene
No.	Title	Writer(s)	Producer	Length
1.	"Frenz"	Mark E. Smith	Simon Rogers	3:24
2.	"Carry Bag Man"	M. Smith	Grant Showbiz	4:00
3.	"Get a Hotel"	M. Smith, Craig Scanlon, Steve Hanley	Rogers	4:29
4.	"Victoria"	Ray Davies	Rogers	2:40
5.	"Athlete Cured"	M. Smith	Rogers	5:52

Side two: Experience
No.	Title	Writer(s)	Producer	Length
6.	"In These Times"	M. Smith	Showbiz	3:25
7.	"The Steak Place"	M. Smith, Brix Smith	Rogers	3:56
8.	"Bremen Nacht"	M. Smith	Rogers	7:00
9.	"Guest Informant" (excerpt)	M. Smith, Scanlon, Hanley	Showbiz	0:39
10.	"Oswald Defence Lawyer"	M. Smith, Hanley	Rogers	5:59

Bonus 7": Bremen Nacht Run Out (UK/German first pressings only)

Side A
No.	Title	Writer(s)	Producer	Length
1.	"Bremen Nacht Run Out"	M. Smith	Ian Grimble	4:40

Side B
No.	Title	Writer(s)	Producer	Length
2.	"Mark'll Sink Us" (live at Biskuithalle, Bonn, August 1987)	M. Smith, Scanlon	Dian Barton	4:42

CD version
No.	Title	Writer(s)	Producer	Length
1.	"Frenz"	M. Smith	Rogers	3:27
2.	"Carry Bag Man"	M. Smith	Showbiz	4:24
3.	"Get a Hotel"	M. Smith, Scanlon, Hanley	Rogers	4:35
4.	"Victoria"	Davies	Rogers	2:44
5.	"Athlete Cured"	M. Smith	Rogers	5:55
6.	"In These Times"	M. Smith	Showbiz	3:26
7.	"The Steak Place"	M. Smith, B. Smith	Rogers	3:57
8.	"Bremen Nacht Alternative"	M. Smith	Barton	9:19
9.	"Guest Informant Excerpt"	M. Smith, Scanlon, Hanley	Showbiz	0:39
10.	"Oswald Defence Lawyer"	M. Smith, Hanley	Rogers	5:59
11.	"Tuff Life Booogie"	M. Smith, B. Smith, Hanley	Rogers	2:44
12.	"Guest Informant"	M. Smith, Scanlon, Hanley	Barton	5:47
13.	"Twister"	M. Smith, B. Smith	Rogers	5:07
14.	"There's a Ghost in My House"	Brian Holland, Lamont Dozier, Eddie Holland, R. Dean Taylor	Showbiz	2:37
15.	"Hit the North (Part 1)"	M. Smith, Simon Rogers, B. Smith	Rogers	4:00

=== 2020 expanded CD edition ===
Disc 1
No.	Title	Writer(s)	Producer	Length
1.	"Frenz"	M. Smith	Rogers	3:27
2.	"Carry Bag Man"	M. Smith	Showbiz	4:24
3.	"Get a Hotel"	M. Smith, Scanlon, Hanley	Rogers	4:35
4.	"Victoria"	Davies	Rogers	2:44
5.	"Athlete Cured"	M. Smith	Rogers	5:55
6.	"In These Times"	M. Smith	Showbiz	3:26
7.	"The Steak Place"	M. Smith, B. Smith	Rogers	3:57
8.	"Bremen Nacht"	M. Smith	Rogers	7:09
9.	"Guest Informant" (excerpt)	M. Smith, Scanlon, Hanley	Showbiz	0:39
10.	"Oswald Defence Lawyer"	M. Smith, Hanley	Rogers	5:59
11.	"Bremen Nacht Run Out"	M. Smith	Grimble	4:44
12.	"Mark'll Sink Us (2)" (live)	M. Smith, Scanlon	Barton	4:22

Disc 2
No.	Title	Writer(s)	Producer	Length
1.	"There's a Ghost in My House" (single A-side, 1987)	Holland, Dozier, Holland, Taylor	Showbiz	2:39
2.	"Sleep Debt Snatches" ("There's a Ghost in My House" 12" single B-side)	M. Smith	Showbiz	6:19
3.	"Mark'll Sink Us" ("There's a Ghost in My House" 12" single B-side)	M. Smith, Scanlon, Hanley	Showbiz	4:55
4.	"Haf Found Bormann" ("There's a Ghost in My House" single B-side)	M. Smith	Showbiz	2:43
5.	"Hit the North" (Part 1) (single A-side, 1987)	M. Smith, Simon Rogers, B. Smith	Rogers	4:00
6.	"Australians in Europe" ("Hit the North" 12" single B-side)	M. Smith	Rogers	5:17
7.	"Northerns in Europ" ("Hit the North" 12" single B-side)	M. Smith	Rogers	2:21
8.	"Guest Informant" ("Victoria" 12" single B-side)	M. Smith, Scanlon, Hanley	Barton	5:51
9.	"Tuff Life Boogie" ("Victoria" single B-side)	M. Smith, B. Smith, Hanley	Rogers	2:44
10.	"Twister" ("Victoria" 12" single B-side)	M. Smith, B. Smith	Rogers	5:07
11.	"Bremen Nacht" (alternative) (1988 CD version))	M. Smith	Barton	9:18
12.	"A Day in the Life" (Sgt. Pepper Knew My Father, 1988)	John Lennon, Paul McCartney	Showbiz	4:24
13.	"Frenz" (Janice Long session; recorded 13 May 1987)	M. Smith	Peter Watts	3:20
14.	"There's a Ghost in My House" (Janice Long session; recorded 13 May 1987)	Holland, Dozier, Holland, Taylor	Watts	3:07
15.	"Get a Hotel" (Janice Long session; recorded 13 May 1987)	M. Smith, Scanlon	Watts	4:15
16.	"Haf Found Bormann" (Janice Long session; recorded 13 May 1987)	M. Smith	Watts	3:30

=== 2020 expanded LP edition ===
Record 1 as per original LP.

Record 2

Side C
No.	Title	Writer(s)	Producer	Length
1.	"There's a Ghost in My House"	Holland, Dozier, Holland, Taylor	Showbiz	2:39
2.	"Sleep Debt Snatches"	M. Smith	Showbiz	6:19
3.	"Mark'll Sink Us"	M. Smith, Scanlon, Hanley	Showbiz	4:55
4.	"Haf Found Bormann"	M. Smith	Showbiz	2:43
5.	"Bremen Nacht Run Out"	M. Smith	Grimble	4:44
6.	"Northerns in Europ"	M. Smith	Rogers	2:21

Side D
No.	Title	Writer(s)	Producer	Length
7.	"Hit the North" (Part 1)	M. Smith, Rogers, B. Smith	Rogers	4:00
8.	"Australians in Europe"	M. Smith	Rogers	5:17
9.	"Guest Informant"	M. Smith, Scanlon, Hanley	Barton	5:51
10.	"Tuff Life Boogie"	M. Smith, B. Smith, Hanley	Rogers	2:44
11.	"Twister"	M. Smith, B. Smith	Rogers	5:07

== Personnel ==
The Fall

- Mark E. Smith – lead vocals, electric piano on "Bremen Nacht"
- Brix Smith – lead guitar, backing vocals
- Craig Scanlon – rhythm guitar, backing vocals
- Steve Hanley – bass guitar, backing vocals
- Simon Wolstencroft – drums, backing vocals
- Marcia Schofield – keyboards, backing vocals

Additional personnel

- Simon Rogers – semi-acoustic guitar, electric saxophone, keyboards, backing vocals

Technical

- Simon Rogers – production
- Grant Showbiz – production
- Dian Barton – production, engineering
- Ian Grimble – production, engineering
- Step Parikian – engineering
- Dave Luff – arrangement on "Oswald Defence Lawyer"
- Paul Cox – front cover photography
- Steve Pyke – back cover photography
