= Molocular Meditation =

Studio album by Jan St. Werner
- Released: 21 February 2020
- Length: 39:36
- Label: Editions Mego
- Producer: Jan St. Werner

Jan St. Werner chronology
Glottal Wolpertinger (2019)	Molocular Meditation (2020)	Space Synthesis (2023)

Molocular Meditation is a studio album by German musician Jan St. Werner. It was released on 21 February 2020 through Editions Mego. It received generally favorable reviews from critics.

== Background ==
Jan St. Werner is a German musician and one half of the duo Mouse on Mars along with Andi Toma. Molocular Meditation consists of four tracks: "Molocular Meditation", "Back to Animals", "On the Infinite of Universe and Worlds", and "VS Cancelled". It features vocal contributions from the late Mark E. Smith of the Fall. Werner, Toma, and Smith previously collaborated as Von Südenfed.

The album was released on 21 February 2020 through Editions Mego.

== Critical reception ==
Professional ratings
Aggregate scores
Source	Rating
Metacritic	80/100
Review scores
Source	Rating
AllMusic	4/5 stars
Pitchfork	6.8/10

According to the review aggregator Metacritic, Molocular Meditation received "generally favorable reviews" based on a weighted average score of 80 out of 100 from 5 critic scores.

Robert Ham of Pitchfork commented that Smith "sounds hale and inspired, evoking the spirit of William S. Burroughs' recorded work in his delivery and unmistakable drawl." Adam Lehrer of The Quietus wrote, "The music is cryptic, otherworldly, and uncanny." Paul Simpson of AllMusic stated, "While some of Werner's solo efforts, brilliant as they are, can seem cold and challenging, Smith's vocals on the album draw out the levity and excitement for exploring new ideas that might not be apparent otherwise."

=== Accolades ===
Year-end lists for Molocular Meditation
Publication	List	Rank	Ref.
The Quietus	Quietus Reissues etc. of the Year 2020	45	

== Track listing ==
All lyrics are written by Mark E. Smith, except track 3 by Giordano Bruno; all music is composed by Jan St. Werner.

Molocular Meditation track listing
No.	Title	Length
1.	"Molocular Meditation"	19:59
2.	"Back to Animals"	4:51
3.	"On the Infinite of Universe and Worlds"	12:09
4.	"VS Cancelled"	2:36
Total length:		39:36

== Personnel ==
Credits adapted from liner notes.

- Jan St. Werner – production
- Mark E. Smith – vocals (1, 2, 4)
- Guiseppe Maria Zevola – vocals (3)
- Andi Toma – pre-mastering
- Zino Mikorey – mastering
- Rupert Smyth Studio – artwork
