= Re-Mit =

Studio album by the Fall
- Released: 13 May 2013
- Genre: Post-punk
- Length: 40:09
- Label: Cherry Red
- Producer: Mark E. Smith

The Fall chronology
Ersatz GB (2011)	Re-Mit (2013)	The Remainderer (2013)

Singles from Re-Mit
- 1. "Sir William Wray" Released: 20 April 2013

Re-Mit is the 29th studio album by the English post-punk group, the Fall. It was released on 13 May 2013 via Cherry Red Records. The album features Mark E. Smith (lead vocals), Peter Greenway (lead guitar), Keiron Melling (drums), Elena Poulou (keyboards, vocals) and David Spurr (bass), and marks the first time in the history of the Fall that the group have released four consecutive studio albums recorded with the same line-up.

== Release ==
The album was announced in early 2013. The album track list was revealed on 11 April 2013. The first single from the album, "Sir William Wray", was released on 20 April for the 2013 Record Store Day. The single contains the alternative versions of the album tracks "Sir William Wray" and "Hittite Man", and was limited to 1500 copies. "Victrola Time" was recorded at the Ersatz GB sessions in 2011 and later overdubbed for the 7" single "Night of the Humerons", where it featured as the lead track. It was released as part of Record Store Day in 2012, in a limited edition of 1000 copies.

The band toured the United Kingdom in May 2013 in support of the album.

Re-Mit entered the UK Album Chart during the week ending 25 May 2013 and peaked at number 40.

== Reception ==
Professional ratings
Aggregate scores
Source	Rating
Metacritic	63/100
Review scores
Source	Rating
AllMusic	2.5/5 stars
The Guardian	3/5 stars
NME	7/10
Pitchfork	6.8/10
Paste	favourable
PopMatters	8/10
The Quietus	unfavorable
Sputnikmusic	3.4/5

Upon its release, Re-Mit received some critical acclaim. At Metacritic, which assigns a weighted average score out of 100 to reviews and ratings from mainstream critics, the album has received a score of 63, based on 21 reviews, indicating "generally favorable reviews".

== Track listing ==
No.	Title	Writer(s)	Length
1.	"No Respects (Intro)"	Mark E. Smith, Tim Presley, Elena Poulou	1:03
2.	"Sir William Wray"	Smith, Poulou	3:33
3.	"Kinder of Spine"	Smith, Presley	2:26
4.	"Noise"	Smith, David Spurr, Peter Greenway	2:28
5.	"Hittite Man"	Smith, Greenway	5:47
6.	"Pre-MDMA Years"	Smith	1:08
7.	"No Respects rev."	Smith, Presley, Poulou	4:58
8.	"Victrola Time"	Smith, Keiron Melling, Poulou (Note: Credited on the 2012 "Night of the Humerons" single to Mark E. Smith and Elena Poulou.)	3:55
9.	"Irish"	Smith, Spurr, Melling	3:42
10.	"Jetplane"	Smith, Spurr, Melling	3:13
11.	"Jam Song"	Smith, Spurr, Melling, Poulou	5:00
12.	"Loadstones"	Smith, Greenway, Poulou	2:56
Total length:			40:09

== Personnel ==
The Fall

- Mark E. Smith – lead vocals, production
- Peter Greenway – lead guitar, backing vocals
- Keiron Melling – drums
- Elena Poulou – keyboards, vocals
- David Spurr – bass, backing vocals

Additional personnel

- Tim Presley – guitar on tracks 1, 3 and 7

Technical

- Simon 'Dingo' Archer – engineering
- Grant Showbiz – engineering
- Andy Pearce – mastering
- Suzanne Smith – cover artwork
- Anthony Frost – cover artwork
- Becky Stewart – cover artwork
