= Wise Ol' Man =

EP by the Fall
- Released: 19 February 2016
- Recorded: 2014–2015
- Genre: Post-punk
- Length: 34:27
- Label: Cherry Red
- Producer: Mark E. Smith

The Fall chronology
Sub-Lingual Tablet (2015)	Wise Ol' Man (2016)	New Facts Emerge (2017)

Professional ratings
Aggregate scores
Source	Rating
Metacritic	71/100
Review scores
Source	Rating
AllMusic	3.5/5 stars
The Line of Best Fit	6/10 stars
Louder	2.5/5 stars
Louder Than War	9/10 stars
PopMatters	6/10 stars
Soundblab	8/10 stars

Wise Ol' Man is an EP by the Fall, released on 19 February 2016 by Cherry Red Records. It features two new songs, "Wise Ol' Man" and "All Leave Cancelled", as well as alternate versions and remixes of songs from the band's 2015 album Sub-Lingual Tablet, and a rare live performance of "No Xmas for John Quays" (from the Fall's first album Live at the Witch Trials), recorded at Brudenell Social Club in Leeds on 28 November 2014.

== Track listing ==
All tracks are written by Mark E. Smith, Elena Poulou and Dave Spurr.

No.	Title	Writer(s)	Length
1.	"Wise Ol' Man" (edit)		3:37
2.	"All Leave Cancelled"		8:19
3.	"Dedication" (remix)	(Note: Credited on Sub-Lingual Tablet to Mark E. Smith and Dave Spurr.)	5:27
4.	"Wise Ol' Man" (instrumental)		3:23
5.	"Venice with the Girls" (remix)	(Note: Credited on Sub-Lingual Tablet to Mark E. Smith, Dave Spurr and Keiron Melling.)	4:04
6.	"Face Book Troll" / "No Xmas for John Quays (live)"	(Note: "No Xmas for John Quays" is credited on Live at the Witch Trials to Mark E. Smith.)	7:30
7.	"All Leave Cancelled" (X)		2:07

== Personnel ==
The Fall

- Mark E. Smith – vocals, production
- Elena Poulou – keyboards, vocals
- Peter Greenway – guitar
- Dave Spurr – bass
- Keiron Melling – drums
- Daren Garratt – drums, backing vocals (uncredited)

Additional personnel

- Simon "Ding" Archer – engineering
- Andy Pearce – mastering
- Suzanne Smith – artwork
