= Tromatic Reflexxions =

Studio album by Von Südenfed
- Released: 21 May 2007
- Genre: Electronic; post-punk
- Length: 48:56
- Label: Domino
- Producer: Von Südenfed

Singles from Tromatic Reflexxions
- 1. "Fledermaus Can't Get It" Released: 2007; 2. "The Rhinohead" / "Slow Down Ronnie" Released: 2007

Tromatic Reflexxions is the debut studio album by Von Südenfed. It was released on 21 May 2007 through Domino Recording Company. It received generally favorable reviews from critics. It entered the UK charts at number 124.

The project is a further collaboration between German electronic music outfit Mouse on Mars and Mark E. Smith of UK band the Fall (Smith had previously provided guest vocals on a Mouse on Mars single in 2005). It includes the singles "Fledermaus Can't Get It" and "The Rhinohead".

== Critical reception ==
Professional ratings
Aggregate scores
Source	Rating
Metacritic	79/100
Review scores
Source	Rating
The A.V. Club	A−
AllMusic	4/5 stars
Robert Christgau	(dud)
The Guardian	4/5 stars
NME	7/10
The Observer	4/5 stars
Pitchfork Media	7/10
PopMatters	7/10 stars
Spin	7/10
The Skinny	2/5 stars

According to the review aggregator Metacritic, Tromatic Reflexxions received "generally favorable reviews" based on a weighted average score of 79 out of 100 from 23 critic scores.

=== Accolades ===
Year-end lists for Tromatic Reflexxions
Publication	List	Rank	Ref.
AllMusic	AllMusic's Favorite Albums of 2007	—	
Cokemachineglow	Top 50 Albums 2007	39	
Drowned in Sound	DiS's Albums of 2007	43	
The Line of Best Fit	Top 70 Albums of 2007	43	

== Track listing ==
All tracks are written by Mark E. Smith, Andi Toma, and Jan St. Werner, except "That Sound Wiped" by Smith, Toma, Werner, and Dodo Nkishi.

Tromatic Reflexxions track listing
No.	Title	Length
1.	"Fledermaus Can't Get It"	3:56
2.	"The Rhinohead"	4:16
3.	"Flooded"	4:46
4.	"Family Feud"	4:28
5.	"Serious Brainskin"	3:51
6.	"Speech Contamination/German Fear of Osterreich"	3:59
7.	"Young the Faceless and the Codes"	4:31
8.	"Duckrog"	2:47
9.	"Chicken Yiamas"	2:36
10.	"That Sound Wiped"	6:04
11.	"Jbak Lois Lane"	2:56
12.	"Dearest Friends"	4:43
Total length:		48:56

== Personnel ==
Credits adapted from liner notes.

- Von Südenfed – production
- DJ Elephant Power – turntables (on "Family Feud")
- Benjamin Alexander Huseby – sleeve
- Rupert Smyth – sleeve
- Jonny Woo – cover modeling
- Jeanette – cover modeling
- Batty Lashes – cover modeling

== Charts ==
Chart performance for Tromatic Reflexxions
Chart (2007)	Peak position
UK Independent Albums (OCC)	9
