= Hit the North =

- 7" vinyl picture disc

Single by The Fall
- A-side: "Hit the North (Part 1)"
- B-side: "Hit the North (Part 2)"
- Released: October 1987
- Genre: Post-punk
- Length: 4:00 (A-side); 3:40 (B-side)
- Label: Beggars Banquet
- Songwriter(s): Mark E. Smith, Brix Smith, Simon Rogers
- Producer(s): Simon Rogers

The Fall singles chronology
"There's a Ghost in My House" (1987)	"Hit the North" (1987)	"Big New Prinz" (1988)

"Hit the North" is a 1987 song by British post-punk band the Fall. The lyrics are by vocalist Mark E. Smith accompanied with music written by Simon Rogers and Brix Smith. It was released as a single in October 1987 and reached number 57 on the UK singles chart.

== Recording ==
The record was part of a conscious approach by Brix Smith and Simon Rogers, both of whom had recently joined the band, in increasing the Fall's popularity and accessibility. Brix said: "It was definitely a conscious thing on my part because they were so, so underground and so unappreciated and unknown. I just thought they were such an important band and it needed to be broadcast all over the world." Her husband at the time, Mark E. Smith, disagreed: "...it wasn’t a conscious effort. It was just trying to get it a bit more punchy. I always like it very clean and simple. A lot of groups are swamped with sound."

The music was written by Rogers and Brix Smith, and recorded by Rogers on his newly-acquired Sequential Circuits Studio 440 sequencer-sampler. Rogers said "literally the first thing I put into it was a bass and a snare just on two pads, a little tiny Indian bell ... and a sax note and a bass note from a Gentle Giant record." When Rogers demonstrated the instrument to Mark E. Smith, Smith said: "What’s that music? I’ll have that, just do me a tape." Smith recorded a demo, with the original programmed drums removed; on the final recording they are replaced by samples of Simon Wolstencroft's drumming. The song was recorded in Abbey Road Studios in July 1987, during the sessions for the band's album The Frenz Experiment, with Rogers as producer and Ian Grimble as recording engineer. Guitar and vocal distortions and other effects were added in the studio.

The lyrics were improvised by Smith, based on the double meaning of "hit" — either "go to", or "punish". He said: 'Hit The North' has a dual meaning; punish it, or go there. When we did the video in Blackpool we were in a Yates' Wine Lodge and all these rugby teams were going 'Hit the North? What's that mean then?' And this girl behind the bar was great; she said 'In America they say "Let's hit L.A.", and they just mean "Let's go there".' Eventually all the old dears joined in and everyone was having a big rap about what it meant. My basic attitude is that I'd rather live here than in the South and it always has been. I don't really care where anybody lives, though, and I think this North/South divide is nonsense. I don't envy anyone who lives in Reading, Swindon, or Northampton; they're horrible new towns and the people are spiritually dead down there.

== Video and reception ==
Scenes in the official video for the single were shot in an old bingo hall in Blackpool, with the regulars being used as extras. Some shots feature Kid Congo Powers (of The Cramps and The Gun Club) dancing along with the other group members, although he was never a member of The Fall. The video also features such Blackpool landmarks as the trams, the Central Pier and the Pleasure Beach.

"Hit the North" is described by Ned Raggett at AllMusic as "one of the most musically conventional numbers the group had ever recorded, but it still contained enough driving bite and sass to rank as a worthy listen....[with its] endlessly chanted chorus ... becoming a catch phrase of its own.... Smith's various chantings and semi-ravings, if buried in the mix at many points, still make everything sound uniquely and distinctly Fall." Jason Heller of Rolling Stone said of the track: "Infectious, spliced with electronics and tailored to the dance floor, the song took breaks from its singalong chorus to let Smith mumble warningly about 'the reflected mirror of delirium.'" Mark E. Smith considered the record to have been a commercial failure, saying: "We lost half our fan base with that, 'cause everybody thought it was disco. Everybody was like, fucking hell, they’ve sold out."

The single reached No. 57 in the UK Singles Chart, one of several Fall singles to make the national chart. Interviewed in 1993, however, Smith explained "Those [chart placings] were accidents... Any idiot can get on the pop charts in Britain."

== Legacy ==
Tom Doyle of Sound on Sound described it as a "rousing groove–based anthem which is now regarded by many as both their ultimate statement and best single". The song title was used by former Fall member Marc Riley and Mark Radcliffe for their 1990 BBC Radio 5 series, primarily a showcase for new bands from the north of England.

== Sources ==
- Hanley, Steve. "The Big Midweek: Life Inside The Fall". London: Route, 2014. ISBN 978-1-9019-2758-0
