= Von Südenfed =

Anglo-German musical collaboration

- Origin: Manchester, England; Düsseldorf, Germany
- Genres: Electronic; post-punk
- Years active: 2007
- Label: Domino
- Members: Mark E. Smith; Andi Toma; Jan St. Werner

Von Südenfed was a collaborative project between Andi Toma and Jan St. Werner (of Mouse on Mars), and Mark E. Smith, leader and vocalist of the Fall.

== History ==
Andi Toma, Jan St. Werner, and Mark E. Smith first collaborated on Mouse on Mars' 12-inch single entitled "Wipe That Sound" (2004), which was released on the Sonig label.

This was followed by Von Südenfed's debut album, Tromatic Reflexxions, released on Domino Recording Company in 2007, with two singles being drawn from the album: "Fledermaus Can't Get It" and "The Rhinohead".

This collaboration of artists from very different musical genres has drawn comparisons to John Lydon's collaboration with Leftfield on the track "Open Up", which is similar in spirit, if not in sound.

Von Südenfed have been compared to LCD Soundsystem in reviews; Smith expressed displeasure at this comparison in interviews, and drew attention to the fact that LCD Soundsystem are heavily influenced by the Fall.

Following the cancellation of two Von Südenfed shows due to illness in December 2007, Smith stated that he had been "sacked" from the group. Despite this, he later performed live with Von Südenfed, and reportedly said that a second album was likely. However, there is no indication that sufficient material was recorded before Smith's death in January 2018.

== Discography ==
=== Studio albums ===
- Tromatic Reflexxions (Domino Recording Company, 2007)

=== Singles ===
- "Fledermaus Can't Get It" (Domino Recording Company, 2007)
- "The Rhinohead" b/w "Slow Down Ronnie" (Domino Recording Company, 2007)
