= Rowche Rumble =

Single by The Fall
- B-side: "In My Area"
- Released: October 1979
- Genre: Post-punk
- Length: 3:59
- Label: Step-Forward
- Songwriter(s): Mark E. Smith, Craig Scanlon, Marc Riley
- Producer(s): Oz McCormick, the Fall

The Fall singles chronology
| "It's the New Thing" (1978) | "Rowche Rumble" (1979) | "Fiery Jack" (1980) |

"Rowche Rumble" is a 1979 song by British post-punk band the Fall, written by Mark E. Smith, Craig Scanlon and Marc Riley. Released as the band's second single, it was the first record by the Fall to reach a recognised national chart when it reached number 31 on the indie chart in January 1980, the first month of that chart's existence.

The song was recorded at Cargo Studios in Rochdale in June 1979 by the band, at that time comprising Smith (vocals), Scanlon (guitar), Riley (guitar), Steve Hanley (bass), Yvonne Pawlett (keyboards), and Mike Leigh (drums). It was produced by Oz McCormick and the band. Its lyrics reputedly reference an incident when Smith worked as a shipping clerk dealing with the Roche pharmaceutical company, and as a result of a clerical error acquired a supply of barbiturates which he attempted to hide around Manchester. According to Riley, the music is loosely based on "Tight Pants", a 1977 b-side from American band Iggy & The Stooges.

The record received positive reviews, with Ned Raggett at Allmusic describing it as "both a highlight of the young band's career and a clear signpost toward much it would do in the future". It was placed at number 21 among the year's top tracks by the NME, and number 40 in John Peel's "Festive Fifty" in 1979.
