= Craig Scanlon =

English guitarist (born 1960)

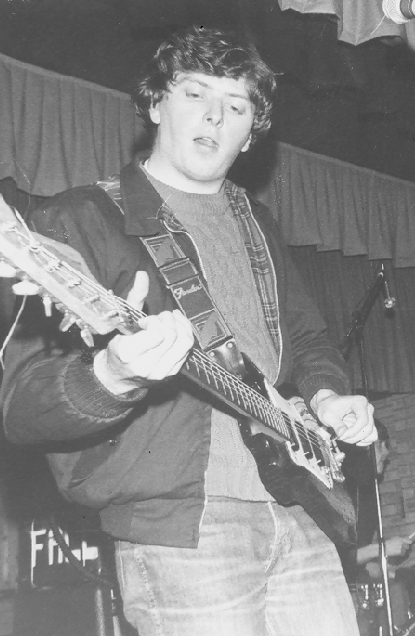
- Craig Scanlon c.1980

Background information
- Born: Craig Antony Scanlon; 7 December 1960 (age 65); Manchester, England
- Genres: Post-punk
- Instruments: Guitar, vocals
- Years active: 1970s–1996
- Formerly of: The Fall

Craig Antony Scanlon (born 7 December 1960 in Manchester) is an English guitarist, best known as a member of the Fall between 1979 and 1995. During his tenure he was a stalwart member for 17 albums and co-wrote over 120 of the group's songs; singer Mark E. Smith and bass player Steve Hanley excepted, this tally is unmatched by any other musician to have passed through the group.

== Career ==
Craig Scanlon joined the band following the departure of previous guitarist Martin Bramah. He and guitarist Marc Riley had previously played together in The Sirens before Riley joined the Fall. Scanlon and bassist Steve Hanley then formed Staff 9 who supported the Fall several times. Whilst Riley was dismissed by Smith, Scanlon and Hanley would form the Fall's musical backbone throughout the 1980s and well into the 1990s with Scanlon occasionally adding vocals and keyboards to his role as well as being a strong song-writing presence. In a 1992 interview with Volume magazine (issue 4), Mark E. Smith described Scanlon and Hanley as "fuckin' hard as nails...very super-intelligent fellows, but they're really reticent...I just love them to death. Jesuit lads, (Note: Though Hanley was raised Catholic, Smith used "Jesuit" metaphorically, meaning someone intelligent, hardworking, devoted, and self-effacing.) you know...Steve and Craig are brilliant". A supporter of Manchester City, Scanlon appeared on John Peel's radio programme in 1993 to discuss the club's form after attending a game he described as "grim" – an excerpt of this can be heard on the group's 1994 album Middle Class Revolt.

In the mid 90s, Scanlon's relationship with Smith deteriorated, culminating in Smith wiping his contributions from the group's 1996 single "The Chiselers". Hanley also later recalled Scanlon, usually one of the band's key songwriters and riff creators, suffered a creative block after Middle Class Revolt and seemed to lose interest in playing guitar. Scanlon was sacked shortly after the recording session for "The Chiselers", though there are differing opinions as to how this came about. Steve Hanley told Simon Ford that Smith sacked the whole group, informing them that if they wanted their jobs back, they would have to ask him; Scanlon refused. In 1996, Smith told Sunday Times journalist Stewart Lee, that Scanlon had been "trying to play jazz or Sonic Youth-style stuff over good simple songs that he'd written himself." Smith gave a different version of events in his 2008 autobiography Renegade, stating "He was a bit of a sacrificial lamb. The group was getting a little too big and nobody was actually doing anything...he may have burnt himself out". He also admits that "it was a big mistake getting rid of him" Smith had previously publicly regretted dismissing Scanlon, telling Q "it was a bad decision...I do miss him". On this occasion, Smith continued "one thing I don't do is have people back. I've done it before and it's a real mistake." However, it was long rumoured that Smith had invited Scanlon to return in 2001; a story confirmed by Scanlon in his only known interview since leaving the group, conducted by Dave Simpson for The Guardian in 2006. However, no reunion was forthcoming, with Scanlon commenting "after three hours in the pub with him I realized I was better out of it".

Scanlon was widely believed not to have played music since leaving The Fall, with rumours that he had been invited to join Elastica never properly substantiated.

In 2011, however, Craig recorded several solo songs with Ian Moss from The Hamsters and Paul and Steve Hanley, these have never been officially released. Subsequently, he has written and recorded with Mike Leigh's band "Kill Pretty". Scanlon's songs "Kill Pretty" and "Black Dog City Blues" can be heard on the In 80 Days album. Scanlon contributed guitar to the 2012 album Dark Heart and the remix album Snakes Sheds Skins where samples of his guitar work were used. He also wrote and played on the track "Something Better" on the 2014 album Bubblegum Now. As Dave Simpson notes in his Guardian article, Scanlon remains a favourite among the group's fans.
