= Mark E. Smith =

English singer (1957–2018)

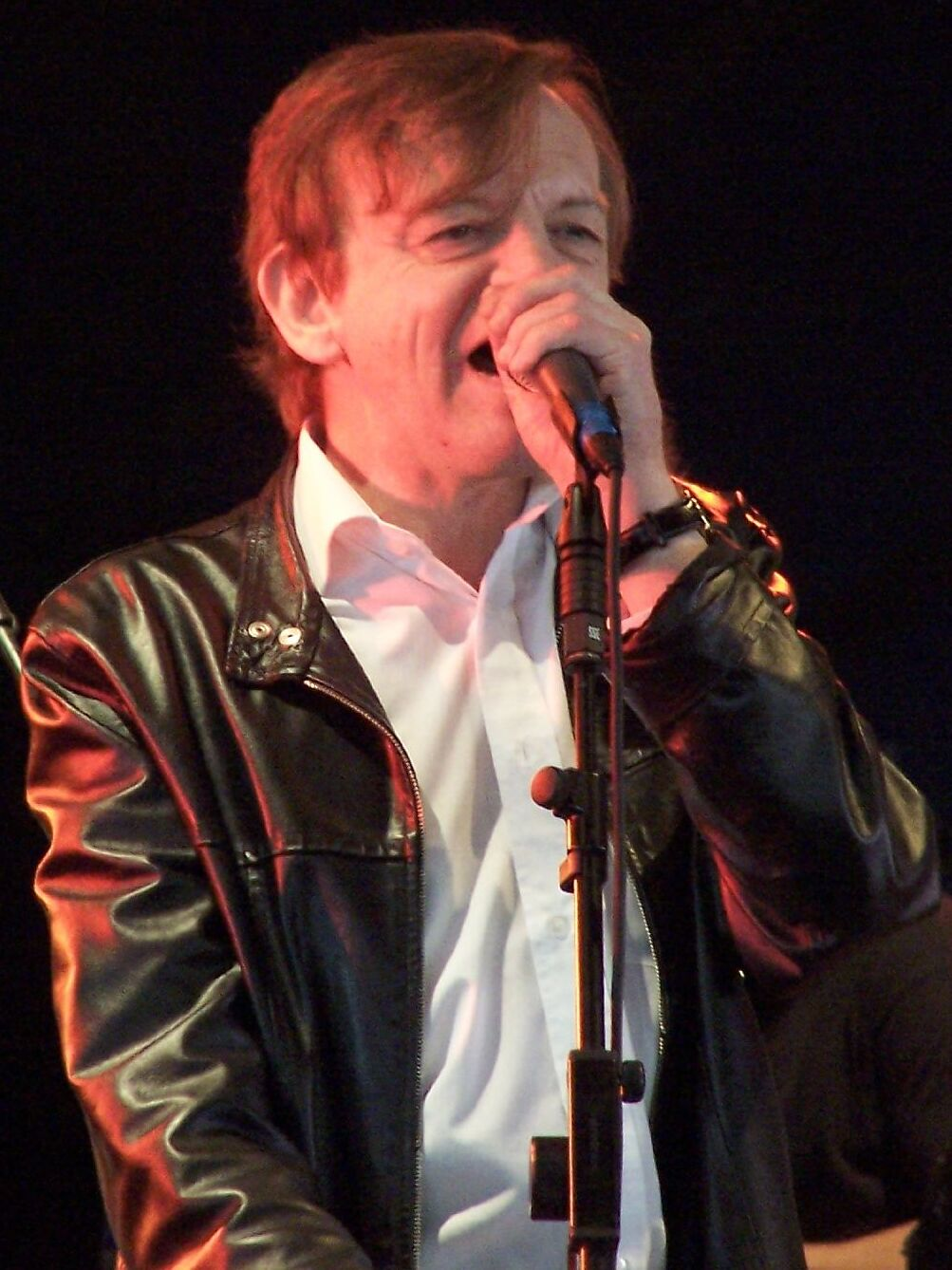
- Smith in 2006

Background information
- Born: Mark Edward Smith; 5 March 1957; Broughton, Lancashire, England
- Died: 24 January 2018 (aged 60) Prestwich, Greater Manchester, England
- Genres: Post-punk; alternative rock; spoken word
- Occupations: Singer; songwriter
- Instruments: Vocals; guitar; keyboards; violin; kazoo; harmonica
- Years active: 1976–2017
- Formerly of: The Fall; Von Südenfed
- Spouse: Brix Smith (m. 1983; div. 1989) Saffron Prior (div. 1995) Eleni Poulou (m. 2001; div. 2016)

Mark Edward Smith (5 March 1957 – 24 January 2018) was an English singer-songwriter best known as the lead vocalist, lyricist and only constant member of the post-punk group the Fall. Smith formed the band after attending the Sex Pistols' 20 July 1976 gig at the Lesser Free Trade Hall in Manchester, and was its leader until his death. During their 42-year existence, the Fall's line-up included some sixty musicians, with whom Smith released 31 studio albums and numerous singles and EPs. (Note: Steve Hanley is second to Smith in longevity in The Fall, having served from 1979 to 1998. He is one of the few Fall musicians to whom Smith always gave credit. In a late 1980s interview, Smith said that "the most original aspect of The Fall is Steve...I've never heard a bass player like him. He is The Fall sound." See Melody Maker interview, 18 June 1983)

Smith had a difficult and complex personality and was a long-term alcoholic. He was known for his biting and targeted wit, evident in interviews, for which he was much in demand by music journalists throughout his career. He was suspicious of the trappings of fame and largely avoided socialising with people associated with the music scene, including other Fall members. The dark and sardonic aspect of his personality often appears in his lyrics; he particularly derided music industry people. (Note: See for example Fall tracks "Music Scene" (1979), "Leave the Capitol" (1980), "Elves" (1984), and "Hey! Student" (1994)) Smith's approach to music was unconventional, and he did not have high regard for musicianship, stating that "rock & roll isn't even music really. It's a mistreating of instruments to get feelings over."

The Fall are regarded as one of the most important and influential post-punk bands of the 1980s, 1990s, and 2000s. Although Smith was difficult to work with, he was revered by fans and critics, and was described as a "strange kind of antimatter national treasure."

== Life and career ==
=== Early life ===
Smith was born to working-class parents Irene (née Brownhill) and Jack Smith, in Broughton, Salford, the eldest of four siblings. He had three sisters: Suzanne (who later painted the front sleeve for the 1980 Fall album Grotesque (After the Gramme)), Caroline, and Barbara. His grandfather, James Brownhill, had fought in France during the Second World War and was involved at the Dunkirk evacuation. Jack was too young to have fought in the war, but joined the army as soon as he was old enough. Smith's parents had moved to nearby Sedgley Park, Prestwich, after their marriage in 1955. Smith's father died suddenly in 1989 of a heart attack.

According to Simon Ford, Smith did not become interested in music until he was about 14, when his father "allowed a record player into the house." The first single he bought was "Paranoid" by Black Sabbath, and his first gig was the Groundhogs at Manchester's Free Trade Hall. He attended Sedgley Park Primary School, and later Stand Grammar School for Boys before leaving aged 16. That year, he left home and moved in with his girlfriend and future Fall keyboardist, Una Baines, later of the Blue Orchids. As a teenager, Smith and his future bandmates frequently used LSD, magic mushrooms, and amphetamines recreationally. He subsequently took an evening class in A-level Literature. His first job was in a meat factory before he became a shipping clerk on Salford docks.

=== The Fall ===
The Fall were named after the 1956 novel by Albert Camus, and initially consisted of Smith and his friends Martin Bramah, Una Baines and Tony Friel. By this time, Smith was unemployed, having dropped out of college at the age of 19. He was dismissed as a shipping clerk at Salford docks; afterwards, he focused on the band. Their early line-up was formed from early members of the punk rock movement. Their music underwent numerous stylistic changes, often concurrently with changes in the group's line-up. The Fall's 40-year career can be broken into five broad periods, based on the band's membership. These include their early, late-1970s line-up, the classic Fall period of Riley/Scanlon/Hanley, the Brix years of 1984-89, their early 1990s revival, and everything after the on-stage fight in New York, after which Hanley quit and Smith was arrested.

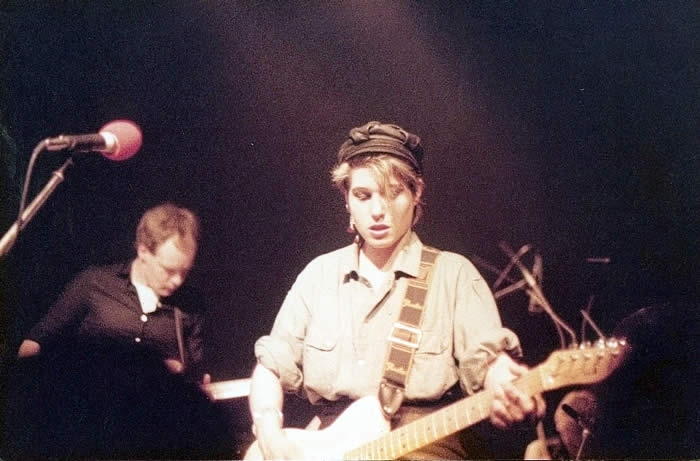
Steve Hanley and Brix Smith, Perverted by Language tour, Hamburg, 1984

He married American guitarist and Fall member Brix Smith on 19 July 1983, after they met in April 1983 in Chicago during a Fall American tour. She joined the group on guitar and vocals for the album Perverted by Language and co-wrote some of the best-regarded Fall tracks from the period, and is widely credited for introducing a more mainstream, pop-orientated element to the group's sound. She remained with the Fall until the couple divorced in 1989.

Smith remarried twice after this. His second marriage to Saffron Prior, who had worked for The Fall's fan club, ended in divorce in 1995. He married Eleni Poulou, also called Elenor or Elena, in 2001. Poulou joined the band in September 2002 and left in April 2016. Smith and Poulou divorced in 2016, and Smith's partner at the time of his death was his manager Pamela Vander.

Referring to the Fall's 60-odd former members, Smith said that he had "only" fired around half the number of people he is said to have dismissed, and that some left of their own free will. He would fire musicians for seemingly trivial reasons; he once dismissed a sound engineer for eating a salad, later explaining that "the salad was the last straw." Marc Riley was fired for dancing to Deep Purple's "Smoke on the Water" during their Australian tour, although the two had had many arguments beforehand. Smith said that he often changed musicians so that they would not become lazy or complacent.

After the influential British DJ and Fall supporter John Peel died in 2004, Smith made a notorious appearance on the BBC's Newsnight show in which he seemed stunned and incoherent, which he afterwards put down to a rare occurrence of stage fright.

While the Fall never achieved widespread success beyond minor hit singles in the mid-1980s, they have had a loyal cult following throughout their career. Steve Hanley is regarded by many as one of the most talented bassists of his generation, equal to Peter Hook, Andy Rourke or Gary Mounfield.

=== Solo work and collaboration ===
Alongside his work with The Fall, Smith released two spoken-word solo albums, The Post-Nearly Man (1998) and Pander! Panda! Panzer! (2002). Both feature readings of Fall lyrics set to electronic sound collages and samples of Fall songs, as well as contributions from members of The Fall. Smith appeared as a guest vocalist for Edwyn Collins, Elastica, Gorillaz, Long Fin Killie, Mouse on Mars, Coldcut and Ghostigital. His contribution to Inspiral Carpets' 1994 song "I Want You" won UK top 20 recognition, topped John Peel's influential Festive Fifty and resulted in Smith's first appearance on the UK TV show Top of the Pops. He worked with Mouse on Mars on the project Von Südenfed, whose album, Tromatic Reflexxions, was released in May 2007. Smith provided guest vocals on the song "Glitter Freeze" from the 2010 Gorillaz album Plastic Beach, and appeared later that year on the Pyramid Stage at Glastonbury 2010, where he joined the band on-stage to perform the song during their headlining set. Smith joined the group Shuttleworth to record the World Cup song "England's Heartbeat." Jan St. Werner's album Molocular Meditation (2020) featured vocal contributions from the late Smith.

In 1986, he wrote the play Hey, Luciani, based on the short reign of Pope John Paul I. Smith made a cameo appearance in the Michael Winterbottom film 24 Hour Party People (2002), while his younger self was portrayed by Sam Riley in a section that did not make the final cut of the film, but appears as a deleted scene on the DVD. Smith made an appearance in the BBC Three sitcom Ideal in May 2007, playing a foul-mouthed, chain-smoking Jesus. A fuzzy, muted version of Fall song "Hip Priest" (1982) appeared in the 1991 film The Silence of the Lambs.

=== Death ===
Smith died on 24 January 2018 after a long illness with lung and kidney cancer, aged 60. His health had been particularly bad during 2017, which led to performances in a wheelchair. A heavy smoker, Smith had long suffered from throat and respiratory problems. His work ethic and output never declined, and throughout his illness he continued to release a new album nearly every year. Tributes to Smith came from Brix Smith, Tim Burgess, Liam Gallagher, Gene Ween, Andy Bell, Mat Osman, Billy Bragg, Win Butler, Cat Power, Edgar Wright, the Pixies, Garbage, Stuart Murdoch, Terry Christian, Graham Coxon, Irvine Welsh and Gorillaz.

== Lyrical and vocal style ==
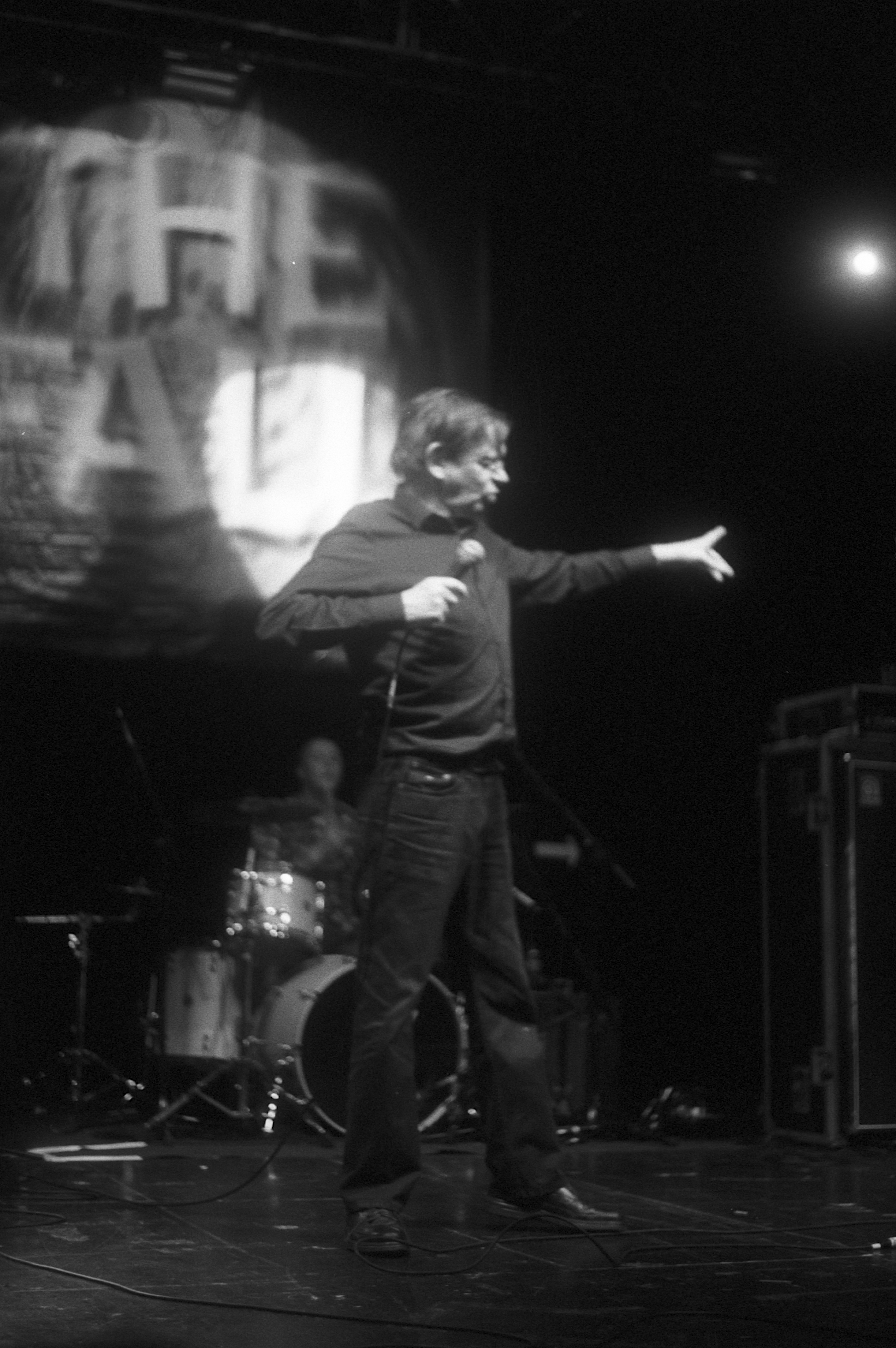
Smith performing in Edinburgh, 2011

Smith sang with a heavy Mancunian accent, and typically wrote in a cryptic style. His abstruse song titles, often derived from cutting out words and phrases from books and newspapers, reflect the same tendency, for example "To Nkroachment: Yarbles" (1985). His vocal style was similarly unusual, and his delivery is known for his tendency to end phrases with an "ah"-sound. He often spoke-sang or slurred his lyrics, especially from the mid-1990s. His singing voice, particularly when playing live, has been described as "rambling", and he often interjected improvised rants between verses. He tended to write lyrics as free-form prose into one of his many notebooks, and only later set them to pieces of music composed by Fall musicians. He was a prolific writer who often wrote in dense, continuous prose, which he would later edit down into lyrics. He crafted compound-noun headline tabloidese titles (Petty Thief Lout, Joker Hysterical Face, Mere Pseud Magazine Ed, Oswald Defence Lawyer) but also worked with the semblance of narrative (Container Drivers; Jawbone and the Air Rifle: "The rabbit hunter said goodbye to his infertile spouse"; Leave the Capital; Sparta FC).

Some of Smith's vocal tracks were recorded spontaneously at his home, when he sang into a dictaphone or cassette recorder, including sections of "Paintwork" from the Fall's 1985 album This Nation's Saving Grace, which also includes the voice of Alan Cooper discussing main sequence stars, from a documentary Smith happened to be watching at the time. He later adapted the resulting sound effect in the studio; examples include the intro to "Bad News Girl" (1988).

Smith's ability as a prose writer is evident in songs that abandon the verse/chorus format in favour of a long continuous narrative. Examples include "Spectre Vs Rector" (1979), "The North Will Rise Again" (1980), "Winter (Hostel-Maxi)" and "Winter 2" (1982), and "Wings" (1983). Fall songs in this style are often not concerned with character or story development, instead establishing a sense of place and atmosphere. By the late 1980s, Smith had largely given up this format. Some early songs concern one of his assumed alter-egos, though always from a third-person point of view. Examples include Roman Totale XVII, "the bastard offspring of Charles I and the Great God Pan", who appears in "The N.W.R.A" (1980), the live album Totale's Turns, "2nd Dark Age" (one of the b-sides to the "Fiery Jack" single), and the sleeve credits for Dragnet, as well as the characters in "Fiery Jack" (1980), "Hip Priest" (1982), "The Man Whose Head Expanded" (1983), and "Riddler" (1986). Rare first person narratives include "Frenz", "Carry Bag Man", and "The Steak Place" from 1988's The Frenz Experiment, as well as "Bill Is Dead" (1990), "Living Too Late" (1986), and "Edinburgh Man" (1991). He did not respond to requests to explain the meaning or sources behind his lyrics. When asked by a journalist as to how much of his self could be found in the song's characters, he replied: "dunno, you're the one sitting there in your round glasses and leather jacket. You tell me what you think it's an extension of...for every bloke pulling a pint, there's about ten thousand journalists writing an article about it."

Fragments of Smith's lyrics often appeared as handwritten scribbles on early Fall album and single covers, coupled with collages he assembled. In a 1983 interview with Sounds, Smith said that he liked artwork to reflect the album content and explained how his graphic choices reflected his attitude to music. He mentioned being drawn to cheap and misspelt posters, amateur layouts of local papers, and printed cash and carry signs with "inverted commas where you don't need them." His art technique was often imitated, for example on Pavement's early releases, which heavily resemble the artwork for Hex Enduction Hour (1982), and whom Smith described as "mere Fall copyists."

Smith's lyrics were described by critic Simon Reynolds as "a kind of Northern English magic realism that mixed industrial grime with the unearthly and uncanny, voiced through a unique, one-note delivery somewhere between amphetamine-spiked rant and alcohol-addled yarn." Smith described his approach as wanting to combine "primitive music with intelligent lyrics." Thematically, his frequently densely layered words often centre around descriptions of urban grotesques, gloomy landscapes, "crackpot history", and are infused with regional slang.

== Personality ==
Smith had a difficult and often reactionary personality, and was defiantly Northern English in outlook. Brix said that he carried "a chip on both shoulders. I remember him talking about fucking southern bastards a lot and not wanting to come to London. He hated London intensely. He's quite contrarian as a person and as a writer, which is what gives him his edge." Throughout his career, he clashed with musicians, record producers, sound engineers, record label heads and fellow Manchester scene alumni such as Tony Wilson, Peter Hook, Shaun Ryder and Morrissey, whom he disparagingly referred to as "Steven" in reference to his given name.

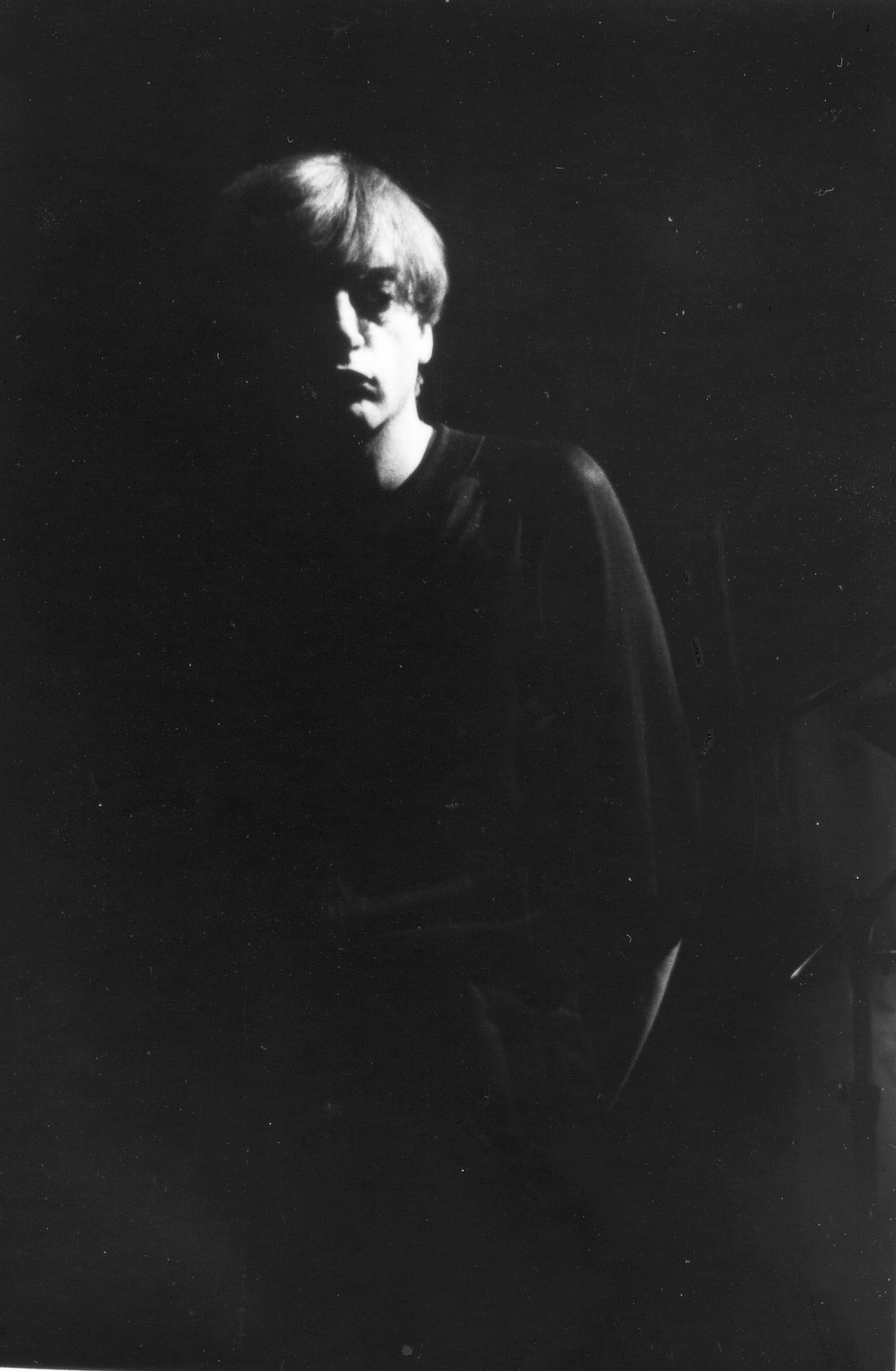
Smith in Tokyo, 1990

Journalist Andrew Harrison noted how Smith wished a majority of his audience were miners and postmen, though a great many were students or Guardian readers. Smith had a working-class outlook and was sceptical of journalists ("They've got bollocks for brains, and they're lazy. They can't be bothered to verify what's in front of their eyes"), as well as professional intellectuals (who he claimed "don't even have any historical perspective on anything"). Nonetheless, Smith was an avid reader and maintained a lifelong interest in literature and books. He cited the following books or authors among amongst his favourites: Colin Wilson, Arthur Machen, Wyndham Lewis, Thomas Hardy, the autobiography of footballer Malcolm Allison, In God's Name by David Yallop, M. R. James, Algernon Blackwood, Clark Ashton Smith, and Philip K. Dick, as well as Edgar Allan Poe, Ezra Pound, Raymond Chandler, and H. P. Lovecraft.

According to biographer Simon Ford, Smith often treated musicians as would "[a] bad-tempered despot." He was highly charismatic and cultivated a wry and misanthropic personality during interviews and live performances. As an interviewee, his dry and caustic wit was very quotable, especially when he was critiquing other contemporary bands and "music personalities", a favoured pastime. He became a mainstay of the English music press throughout the 1980s and 1990s, and his sharp tongue often turned on the journalists themselves; many reported being nervous before meeting him, and published "war stories" afterwards.

During his later performances, Smith often walked off stage in frustration, or maliciously interfered with the musicians' instruments. This behaviour culminated during a 1998 gig at Brownies in New York, at a low point in his life when he was drinking heavily and band morale was dismal. During the performance, he got into an onstage fight with the other musicians, leading to long-term bassist Steve Hanley and drummer Karl Burns quitting the band. The night ended with Smith's arrest for assaulting his girlfriend and Fall keyboardist Julia Adamson, and is widely considered the band's nadir and Smith's low point. Smith was ordered to undergo treatment for alcohol abuse and anger management. The police charges were dropped after a period of good behaviour.

Smith said that his favourite things in life were "Scottish people, cats, Coronation Street, and Can." He was a passionate football fan and lifelong Manchester City follower, even appearing on the BBC's Final Score to read the classified football results. He admired mavericks such as George Best, whom he met and drank with, and remarked that as Best could draw a crowd of 40,000 people a week he should have been able to "do what he liked."

Originally a Labour supporter, Smith left the party during the Falklands War (which he supported), then became further disillusioned with Labour during the Tony Blair era. In the 1997 election, he voted for the Conservative Party in opposition to Blair. Asked during a mid-1980s interview with Smash Hits as to what policies he would adopt if he became Prime Minister, he said: "I'd halve the price of cigarettes, double the tax on health food, then I'd declare war on France." In a 2012 interview, Smith jokingly stated he would put the Queen in charge of Britain when asked the same question. Smith also expressed support for the UK's withdrawal from the European Union. Although a longstanding member of the Musicians Union, he criticised their political outlook, saying, "all they say is vote Corbyn and stay in the European Union".

Smith believed he was psychic, with one prominent incident in which he had an ominous premonition that the Matterhorn Bobsleds ride at Disneyland was evil after visiting the amusement park in 1984. His then-wife Brix said he was brought to tears during the incident. Later that same day, a female passenger was thrown from the ride and decapitated by an oncoming car, with visitors comforted by employees dressed as Disney characters. Smith also had a general interest in the supernatural and occultism, and performed Tarot readings semi-professionally during the early years of the Fall (mostly accepting small amounts of drugs or other gifts rather than cash payments). In his memoir Renegade Smith recalled: "When I was really skint in 2000, I thought to myself, I should be doing that again. You can earn £40 an hour."

== Legacy ==
Smith was both resigned and ambivalent about his legacy, especially in terms of the fad-orientated music industry of which he was often harshly critical in his lyrics. He noted, somewhat bitterly, how "every artist wants credibility. A couple of years ago, I read a poll on the hundred best artists of all time. The Fall was in there between Mozart and Puccini. I was very proud of that. Of course, the next day I can pick up a paper and be the guy with no teeth who beats everybody up." Despite this, he was widely influential and critically acclaimed throughout his career.

Similarly, he refused to look backwards; when recording, he was adamant that the Fall not repeat themselves stylistically, and when playing live, he often refused to play old songs. The approach is further seen in his strategy of frequently replacing band members. Long-term fan John Peel said that "the Fall are the group against which all others must measure themselves", and when asked which Fall albums he would recommend to newcomers, he replied, "all of them." In January 2005, Smith was the subject of The Fall: The Wonderful and Frightening World of Mark E. Smith, a BBC Four television documentary.

Several alternative rock artists have mentioned Smith in their songs. The Jazz Butcher released "Southern Mark Smith" in 1983. Barbara Manning's song "Mark E. Smith & Brix" appears on her 1989 album Lately I Keep Scissors. German rock band Tocotronic mentioned him in their song "Ich habe geträumt, ich wäre Pizza essen mit Mark E. Smith" ("I dreamt I went to eat pizza with Mark E. Smith") on their 1996 album Wir kommen um uns zu beschweren (We come to complain). Elastica released the track "How He Wrote Elastica Man" in 2000, which was co-written by, and features Smith, the title being a reference to the 1980 Fall song "How I Wrote 'Elastic Man'", while in 2014 Fat White Family released an EP titled "I Am Mark E Smith.", a reference to the 1985 Fall song "I am Damo Suzuki". Sonic Youth covered three Fall songs, as well as the Kinks' "Victoria", which they released in 1990 as the 4 Tunna Brix EP. Cedric Bixler-Zavala, singer for the American groups At the Drive-In and The Mars Volta, described Smith as "one of the pillars of influence for me as lyricist and trouble maker." Additionally, Smith's talk-singing style was later credited with inspiring the 2010s post-punk revival or "Post-Brexit New Wave".

== Literature ==
- Mark E. Smith: Renegade: The Lives and Tales of Mark E. Smith, Viking (2008), ISBN 0-670-91674-9
