= Inspiral Carpets discography =

- Studio albums: 5
- EPs: 8
- Compilation albums: 6
- Singles: 25
- Video albums: 3
- Demo releases: 3

This is the discography of English rock band Inspiral Carpets.

== Albums ==
=== Studio albums ===
Title	Album details	Peak chart positions				Certifications
Title	Album details	UK	UK Indie	AUS	NZ	Certifications
Life	Released: 23 April 1990; Label: Mute; Formats: LP, CC, CD	2	1	140	22	BPI: Gold
The Beast Inside	Released: 22 April 1991; Label: Mute; Formats: LP, CC, CD	5	1	157	—	BPI: Silver
Revenge of the Goldfish	Released: 5 October 1992; Label: Mute; Formats: LP, CC, CD	17	1	123	—	
Devil Hopping	Released: 7 March 1994; Label: Mute; Formats: LP, CC, CD	10	2	180	—	
Inspiral Carpets	Released: 20 October 2014; Label: Cherry Red; Formats: LP, CD, digital download	63	12	—	—	
Burn Like the Sun	Due for release: 29 January 2027; Label: Scruff Of The Neck; Formats: LP, CD, digital download					

=== Compilation albums ===
Title	Album details	Peak chart positions		Certifications
Title	Album details	UK	UK Indie	Certifications
The Singles	Released: 18 September 1995; Label: Mute; Formats: 2×LP, CC, CD	17	5	
Radio 1 Sessions	Released: May 1999; Label: Strange Fruit; Formats: CD	—	—	
Cool As	Released: 5 May 2003; Label: Mute; Formats: 2×CD+DVD	65	—	
Greatest Hits	Released: 27 October 2003; Label: Mute; Formats: CD	—	—	BPI: Silver
Keep the Circle: B-Sides and Udder Stuff	Released: 26 February 2007; Label: Mute; Formats: digital download	—	—	
The Complete Singles	Released: 17 March 2023; Label: Mute; Formats: 2×LP, 3×CD	74	—	
"—" denotes releases that did not chart or were not released in that territory.

=== Video albums ===
Title	Album details
21790 Live	Released: November 1990; Label: Mute Film/BMG Video; Formats: VHS
The Singles	Released: September 1995; Label: Mute Film; Formats: VHS
Live at Brixton Academy	Released: January 2004; Label: Mute/Cow; Formats: DVD

== EPs ==
Title	EP details	Peak chart positions		
Title	EP details	UK	UK Indie	IRE
Plane Crash	Released: July 1988; Label: Playtime; Formats: 12"	—	—	—
Trainsurfing	Released: March 1989; Label: Cow; Formats: 12"	148	5	—
The Peel Sessions	Released: July 1989; Label: Strange Fruit; Formats: 12", CD	—	5	—
Cool As ****	Released: May 1990; Label: Cow; Formats: 12", CC, CD; US-only release	—	—	—
Island Head	Released: 5 November 1990; Label: Mute; Formats: 7", 12", CC, CD	21	—	29
Island Head Live	Released: 5 November 1990; Label: Mute; Formats: 12"	—	—	—
Peel Session	Released: 17 August 1992; Label: Strange Fruit; Formats: 10", CC, CD	—	—	—
The Tour Souvenir EP – Australia 1993	Released: 1993; Label: Liberation; Formats: CD; Australia promo-only release	—	—	—
"—" denotes releases that did not chart or were not released in that territory.

== Demo releases ==
Title	Album details
Waiting for Ours	Released: 1987; Label: Inspiral Carpets; Formats: MC
Cow	Released: 1987; Label: Inspiral Carpets; Formats: MC
Dung 4	Released: May 1989; Label: Cow; Formats: MC

== Singles ==
Title	Year	Peak chart positions						Certifications	Album
Title	Year	UK	UK Indie	AUS	IRE	US Alt	US Dance	Certifications	Album
"Keep the Circle Around"	1988	—	13	—	—	—	—		Non-album singles
"Joe"	1989	130	5	—	—	—	—		Non-album singles
"Find Out Why"	1989	90	1	—	—	—	—		Non-album singles
"Move"	1989	49	1	—	—	—	—		Life
"This Is How It Feels"	1990	14	—	149	—	22	—	BPI: Silver	Life
"She Comes in the Fall"	1990	27	—	—	—	—	—		Life
"Commercial Rain" (US-only release)	1990	—	—	—	—	27	15		Life
"Biggest Mountain" (Note: In the UK and most countries, "Biggest Mountain" was released on the EP Island Head.)	1990	21	—	122	29	—	—		Non-album single
"Caravan"	1991	30	—	—	—	15	14		The Beast Inside
"Please Be Cruel"	1991	50	—	187	—	—	—		The Beast Inside
"Dragging Me Down"	1992	12	—	197	30	—	—		Revenge of the Goldfish
"Two Worlds Collide"	1992	32	—	177	—	8	—		Revenge of the Goldfish
"Generations"	1992	28	—	199	—	—	—		Revenge of the Goldfish
"Bitches Brew"	1992	36	—	—	—	—	—		Revenge of the Goldfish
"How it Should Be"	1993	49	—	112	—	—	—		Non-album single
"Saturn 5"	1994	20	—	—	—	—	—		Devil Hopping
"I Want You" (featuring Mark E. Smith)	1994	18	—	—	—	—	—		Devil Hopping
"Uniform"	1994	51	—	—	—	—	—		Devil Hopping
"Joe" (re-recording)	1995	37	—	—	—	—	—		The Singles
"Come Back Tomorrow"	2003	43	—	—	—	—	—		Cool As
"You're So Good for Me"	2011	—	—	—	—	—	—		Inspiral Carpets
"Fix Your Smile"	2013	—	—	—	—	—	—		Non-album single
"Spitfire"	2014	—	—	—	—	—	—		Inspiral Carpets
"Let You Down" (featuring John Cooper Clarke)	2015	—	—	—	—	—	—		Inspiral Carpets
"Drag the Bag"	2026	—	—	—	—	—	—		Burn Like the Sun
"—" denotes releases that did not chart or were not released in that territory.
