= The Singles (Inspiral Carpets album) =

Inspiral Carpets The Singles

Greatest hits album by Inspiral Carpets
- Released: 1995
- Recorded: 1989–1993
- Genre: Indie rock
- Length: 74:34
- Label: Mute - Mootel 3
- Producer: Various

Inspiral Carpets chronology
Devil Hopping (1994)	Inspiral Carpets The Singles (1995)	Inspiral Carpets Radio 1 Sessions (1996)

Inspiral Carpets The Singles Is a compilation of singles by English band Inspiral Carpets, released 18 September 1995 on Mute Records.

== Track listing ==
=== LP/CD: Mute Records / (CD) MOOTEL 3 (UK) ===
Tracks are listed on artwork in non-chronological order. However they play on the actual disc in order of original release. Several tracks appear as different versions to those on their parent albums.

All tracks are written by Inspiral Carpets.

No.	Title	Original album	Length
1.	"Joe" (re-recorded)	Cool as Fuck (1990)	3:23
2.	"Find Out Why"	Cool as Fuck	2:04
3.	"Move"	Life (1990)	3:26
4.	"This Is How It Feels" (single version)	Life	3:13
5.	"She Comes in the Fall" (single version)	Life	4:10
6.	"Commercial Rain"	Life (North American version only)	4:43
7.	"Sackville" (single version)	Life	4:59
8.	"Biggest Mountain"	Island Head (1990)	4:29
9.	"Weakness"	Life (North American version only)	4:18
10.	"Caravan" (12" version)	The Beast Inside (1991)	5:47
11.	"Please be Cruel" (single version)	The Beast Inside	3:38
12.	"Dragging Me Down"	Revenge of the Goldfish (1992)	4:33
13.	"Two Worlds Collide"	Revenge of the Goldfish	4:41
14.	"Generations"	Revenge of the Goldfish	2:49
15.	"Bitches Brew"	Revenge of the Goldfish	3:52
16.	"How it Should Be"	Non-album single (1993)	3:17
17.	"Saturn 5"	Devil Hopping (1994)	3:59
18.	"I Want You" (single version ft. Mark E. Smith)	Devil Hopping	3:10
19.	"Uniform"	Devil Hopping	3:52
Total length:			74:34

=== 2xLP: Mute Records / LMOOTEL 3 (UK) ===
- Limited edition double vinyl release with bonus 7":
1. "Weakness (Live)"
2. "Caravan (Live)"

=== Singles ===
1. Dung 27 - "Joe (Acoustic)" (1995)

=== VHS: Mute Film ===
1. "Joe '95" (3:21)
2. "This Is How it Feels" (3:13)
3. "She Comes in the Fall (4:12)
4. "Commercial Rain" (4:41)
5. "Biggest Mountain" (4:27)
6. "Caravan" (3:40)
7. "Please be Cruel" (3:38)
8. "Dragging Me Down" (4:24)
9. "Two Worlds Collide" (4:36)
10. "Generations" (2:48)
11. "Bitches Brew" (3:49)
12. "How it Should Be" (3:13)
13. "Saturn 5" (3:51)
14. "I Want You" (3:20)
15. "Uniform" (3:53)

== Charts ==
Chart (1995)	Peak position
Scottish Albums (OCC)	22
UK Albums (OCC)	17
