= Find Out Why =

Single by Inspiral Carpets

from the album Cool as Fuck
- Released: August 1989
- Recorded: May–June 1989; Square One
- Genre: Punk rock, progressive rock
- Length: 2:03
- Label: Cow Records
- Songwriters: Graham Lambert; Clint Boon; Martyn Walsh; Craig Gill; Tom Hingley

"Find Out Why" is a single by the British punk rock and progressive rock group Inspiral Carpets. It was released in August 1989, with plane crash as a 16-minute B-side. In 1990, it was re-released in the US as the Cool as Fuck EP, which included the bonus tracks "Joe" and "Out of Time". The EP featured a modified version of the single's, with a different shade of green and the title and logo overlaid.

Later that year, the track was rewritten as the theme tune for The 8:15 from Manchester.

== B-sides ==
The 7" version does not contain the B-side "Plane Crash". The track was recorded live to 2 inch tape in one take.

According to the liner notes track of the Keep the Circle compilation, "Plane Crash" was intended to be as long as the master tape would allow. The original song is said to have run an hour long. The spoken line "We've got ten minutes" by Tom Hingley at the 10:06 mark of the track is said to have been in response to someone asking what time it was. The abrupt cut-out at the end of the song is due to the tape running out.

== Track listing ==
No.	Title	Length
1.	"Find Out Why"	2:03
2.	"So Far"	2:10
3.	"Plane Crash"	16:37
