= Plane crash (disambiguation) =

A plane crash is a type of aviation accident or incident.

Plane Crash may also refer to:

- "The plane crash" (Neighbours), a storyline from the Australian television soap opera Neighbours
- "Plane Crash", a song by the British band Inspiral Carpets, written in 1986 and recorded as a B-side for the 1989 single "Find Out Why"
- Plane Crash, a 1988 EP by Inspiral Carpets
- "Plane Crash", a 2012 episode of the television series Curiosity
- Plane Crash (TV series), a 2012 Channel 4 documentary series created by Geoff Deehan
