= Joe (Inspiral Carpets song) =

Single by Inspiral Carpets

from the album Cool as Fuck
- Released: 2 May 1989
- Recorded: February 1989; Square One
- Genre: Madchester, post-punk
- Length: 3:26
- Label: Cow Records
- Songwriters: Clint Boon, Craig Gill, Tom Hingley, Graham Lambert, Martyn Walsh

"Joe" is a single by British rock band Inspiral Carpets, released in 1989.

Written in 1985, it was first song recorded on New Year's Eve 1987 as part of the demo album Dung 4, which was released in May 1989. The original version was written by Clint Boon and sung by Stephen Holt, but when Tom Hingley joined the band in 1988, it was modified. The modified version, issued on the "Joe" 12" in 1989 became the standard, and it was still played even after Holt rejoined the band.

== Music video ==
A music video for the song was filmed by an unknown avantgardist in 1990. It features shots of a homeless man and footage of a British cities including London (including St Paul's Cathedral and Christ Church, Spitalfields) mixed with shots of many-coloured lines running up and down the screen, filmed with a blue filter. The video was typical of many English "Indie" releases of the "Madchester" era. In 1995, to promote the release of The Singles, another video was released, based on footage from 21790 and set to a shortened version of the song.

When played live as Hingley's modified version, the intro blast beat was repeated for exactly one minute. This can be heard on the 21790 live video. The Inspirals stopped extending the blast beat around 1991. Around the Revenge of the Goldfish era, the song, instead of abruptly ending, would instead have a final guitar strum and a final measure of Clint Boon's keyboards. Recent performances (both with Hingley and Holt) have returned to the studio-style ending.

== Influences ==
Source:

== Track list ==
=== Original 12"/CD release - Cow (Moo 3) ===
1. "Joe" (3:26)
2. "Commercial Mix" (4:35)
3. "Directing Traffik" (2:35)
4. "Commercial Rain" (4:38)

=== 1995 CD reissue - Cow (Dung 27) ===
1. "Joe"
2. "Joe" (live)
3. "Sackville" (live)
4. "Saviour" (live)
5. "Seeds of Doubt"
6. "Whiskey"
7. "Joe" (acoustic)
