= Kim Weston (photographer) =

American photographer (born 1953)

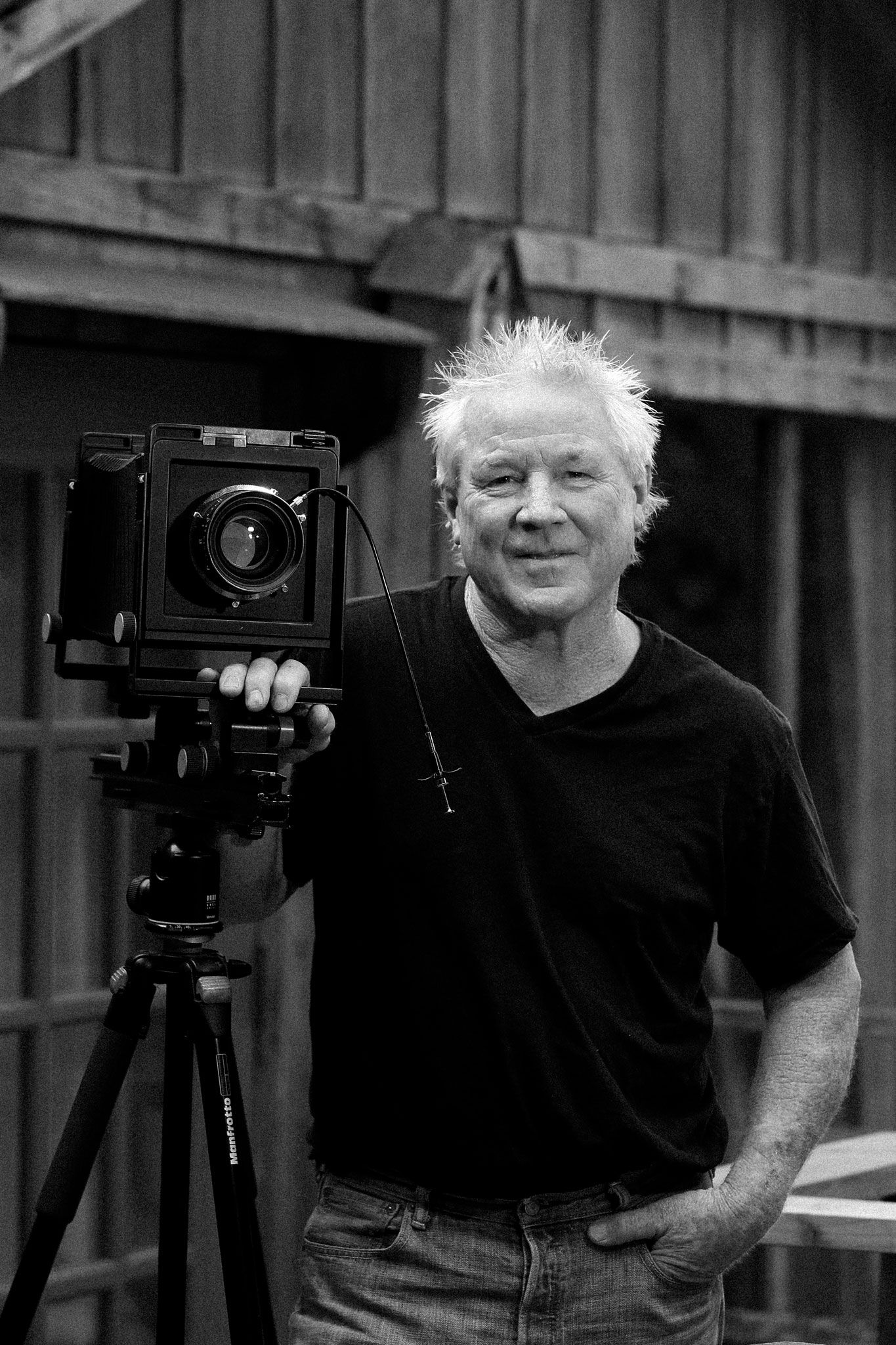
- Kim Weston in 2014 on Wildcat Hill.
- Born: 1953 (age 72–73)
- Known for: Fine Art Photography
- Spouse: Gina Weston
- Website: www.kimweston.com

Kim Weston (born 1953) is an American photographer known for his fine art nude studies.

Weston is a third-generation member of one of the most well-recognized families in modern photography, which includes his grandfather Edward Weston, his uncle Brett Weston, and his father Cole Weston.

Kim Weston's experience with the art of traditional black and white photography was cultivated assisting his father and his uncle in their respective darkrooms.

== Life and work ==
Weston's artist's statement says "I make pictures which are meant to be direct and truthful. I do not explain or rationalize this work or my passion for it. I leave it to the viewer to find the surprises. I hope the work generates feelings; otherwise I have failed."

He learned photography "assisting his father, Cole Weston, in the darkroom making gallery prints from the original negatives of his grandfather, Edward Weston." He also worked for fifteen years as an assistant to his uncle, Brett Weston.

Weston first photographed using a Rolleiflex twin lens reflex camera. When he reached his twenties, his main camera was a 4×5 (large format) Linhof - a gift from his uncle Brett Weston. He used this camera for many years, his interest shifting from photographing rocks and trees in the traditional Weston family style to nude figure studies. In his thirties he switched to an 8×10 Calumet given to him by his father. His studio nudes were becoming quite complex, often telling stories of his life in each series. Weston now photographs with a medium format Mamiya RB67 he inherited from his father. He prints 8×10, 11×14 and 16×20. (Note: All these print sizes are in inches, and are of the photographic paper as a whole, including margins.) He still develops, prints, and finishes his own work.

In 2004, Weston began applying oil paints, pastels, watercolors, and colored pencils to his silver gelatin prints. He said:

"My painted photographs have given me a release from surface importance and visual certainty. I can take my image and tweak it to another dimension which if I think about it was my original direction and interpretation of the subject to begin with."

Weston "founded the Weston Scholarship Fund (now The Weston Collective) in 2004 to support high school and college students studying fine-art, black and white, film photography in Monterey County."

== Personal life ==
Weston lives on Wildcat Hill in Carmel Highlands, CA, Edward Weston's former home, with his wife, Gina, and his son, Zachary, where he teaches several photography workshops every year. The pine-wood cabin on Wildcat Hill, designed by Edward's third son Neil, was built in 1938.

== Exhibitions ==
=== Solo exhibitions ===
- Kim Weston. Weston Gallery. Carmel, CA. April–May 1987
- Kim Weston. Camera Obscura Gallery. Denver, CO. February–March 1988.
- Kim Weston. Center for Photographic Art. Carmel, CA. 1997.
- Painted Photographs. Center for Photographic Art, Carmel, CA. September, 2012; Pacific Grove Art Center, Pacific Grove, CA. January 2008; Duncan Miller Gallery, Los Angeles CA. February 2009.
- New Work. Exposed Gallery, Carmel, CA. May 2010.
- Legacy: The Work of Kim Weston. Arts & Architecture Gallery, Ottawa, CAN. September–October 2010.
- Painted Ballerinas. Marjorie Evans Gallery, Carmel, CA. December 2010; Duncan Miller Gallery, Los Angeles CA. July 2011; Center for Photographic Art, Carmel, CA. June 2012
- Silver Gelatin and Painted Photographs. Red Door Gallery, Mt. Shasta, CA. October 2012.
- Kim Weston Photographs. Timeless Gallery, Beijing, China. November 2014.
- New Work by Kim Weston. Exposed Gallery, Carmel, CA. June 2016
- Collector Prints. Exposed Gallery, Carmel, CA. August 2016.

=== Joint and group exhibitions ===
- The Gilbert Gallery. Chicago, IL. March – April, 1978.
- Albright-Knox Member's Gallery. Buffalo, NY. October – November, 1978.
- Jeb Gallery. Providence, RI. April – May, 1980.
- Brooks Institute. Santa Barbara, CA. May, 1980.
- Zenith Gallery. Pittsburgh, PA. 1982.
- Photo Gallery International, Tokyo, Japan. July – August, 1982.
- Recent Work. Kim Weston and Randy Efros. Photography Southwest Gallery. Scottsdale, AZ. November, 1982.
- The Photographs of Kim Weston, David Sklar and Gary Rusk. The Gold Room Gallery, Scottsdale Community College, Scottsdale, AZ. January – February 1983.
- Weston: Three Generations of Photography. The Photographer's Gallery of Palo Alto. October – November, 1983.
- The Weston Eye: Edward, Cole, Brett and Kim Equivalents Gallery. Seattle, WA. April, 1985.
- Focus Gallery. San Francisco, CA. March – April, 1985.
- Commune e Pro Loco di Colorno. Colorno – Parma, Italy. May – June, 1985.
- A Weston Retrospective – Three Generations of Westons. The Camera Obscura Gallery. Denver, CO. November – December, 1986.
- Monterey Peninsula Gallery. Monterey, CA. 1987.
- Pacific Grove Art Center. Monterey, CA. April – May, 1987.
- Ulrich Museum. Wichita, KS. November, 1988 – January 1989.
- Kim Weston and Tony Marsh. Pacific Grove Art Center. Pacific Grove, CA. September 1990.
- Edward – Cole – Kim Weston: Three Generations of American Photography. German Tour: 13 museums and cities. By Institut fur Kulturaustausch on behalf of The German – American Institute and The Wichita State University. June 1989 – May 1991.
- Illuminated Artifice: Masks, Facades, Tableaux Photography. Kim Weston, Winston Swift Boyer and Sandy Skoglund. Brendan Walter Gallery, Santa Monica, CA. June – July, 1991.
- Unpainted to the Last. Moby Dick in American Art, 1940-1990. The Spencer Art Museum, University of Kansas. Fall, 1994
- Three Generations of Westons. Pacific Grove Art Center. Pacific Grove, CA. 1999.
- Mixed Media Show: Paintings, Photographs and Painted Photographs. Marjorie Evans Gallery, Carmel, CA. November 1999.
- Kim Weston and Gifford Ewing. Shaw Jewelry. Northeast Harbor, ME, 2003.
- Kim Weston and Randy Efros with Workshop Participants. Bentley Gallery Projects, Phoenix, AZ. November, 2003.
- The Noble Metals: Platinum and Palladium. Group. International Hall of Fame and Museum: Main Gallery with The Oklahoma Arts Council. Oklahoma, OK. April – July 2005.
- Painted Photographs: A Collaboration. Kim Weston and Reed Farrington. The Gallery of the Blackstone Winery, Hartnell College, Gonzales, CA. August – November 2006.
- Painted Photographs: A Collaboration. Kim Weston and Reed Farrington. PK Fine Artifacts, Sand City, CA. November, 2006.
- 40th Anniversary Show. Center for Photographic Art. Carmel, CA. November 2007.
- Edward and Kim Weston Fotographs. Centro Fotograpfico Manuel Alvarez Bravo, Oaxaca, Mexico. October, 2007.
- Three Generations of Weston. The Gallery at the Creative Center for Photography, Hollywood, CA. September – December, 2007.
- Kim Weston, Brett Weston and Randy Efros. 422 Framing + Gallery, Phoenix, AZ. February 2011.
- Kim Weston ''Under the Influence: The Essence of Edward Weston in Contemporary Photography Crowell’s Fine Art Gallery and Fine Framing, New Bedford, MA. July 2011.
- Pure Photography, Post Production and Mixed Media. Phoenix Art Museum, Phoenix, AZ. April – August 2011.
- Miniature Show. Exposed Gallery, Carmel, CA. November 2011.
- The Weston Family Show. Open Shutter Gallery Durango, CO. December 2011 – February 2012.
- 4 Generations of Weston Photography. Sang K Jun Arts and Science Gallery, Santa Clara, CA. 2013.
- 3 Generations of The Weston Family of Photographers. Midwest Museum of Art, Elkhart, IN. 2013.
- 3 Generation Weston Photography Exhibition. Kuusamo XVIII Nature Photo Festival, Kuusamo, Finland 2013.
- 8 x 10 – Fundraising Exhibition. Center for Photographic Art, Carmel, CA. 2013
- Weston Four Generations 1886-2014. Steinbeck Center, Salinas, CA. March 2014.
- 10 Years at Wildcat. The Loft Gallery, San Pedro, CA. August 2014.
- All That Glitters is Not Gold. Phoenix Art Museum, Phoenix, AZ. November 2014.
- Between the Shadows. Galerie a La Riviere, Paris, France. 2014
- National Museum of China, Beijing, China. November 2014
- Journey of the Heart: Exhibition of Straight Photography Original Prints 1839-2014.
- Bajo El Cielo Andaluz. Casa Degli Italini, Barcelona, Spain. September 2015.
- Photo Shanghai Timeless Gallery, Beijing, Shanghai. September 2015.
- Grotteschi | Exploring Hieronymus Bosch. Visual Arts Gallery, Carmel, CA. October 2015.
- The Westons. Scott Nichols Gallery. San Francisco CA, February - August 2016
- Four Generations of Weston: Black and White. Viewpoint Gallery. Sacramento CA. April - June 2016
- Under the Andalusian Sky. Fundación Valentín de Madariaga. Sevilla, May - July Spain 2016
- Weston 4 Generations: Classics of Modern American Photography. Kunsträume grenzenlos, in Bayerisch Eisenstein. July 2017.

== Bibliography ==
- Buchsteiner, Thomas. Edward Cole Kim Weston: Three Generations of American Photography. Schaffhausen: Stemmle, 1995. ISBN 3-905514-40-0.
- Kim Weston, Ballet 2007 Calendar, 2006
- Kim Weston by Kim Weston. Laguna Beach: FACT, 1997
