= Tom Hingley =

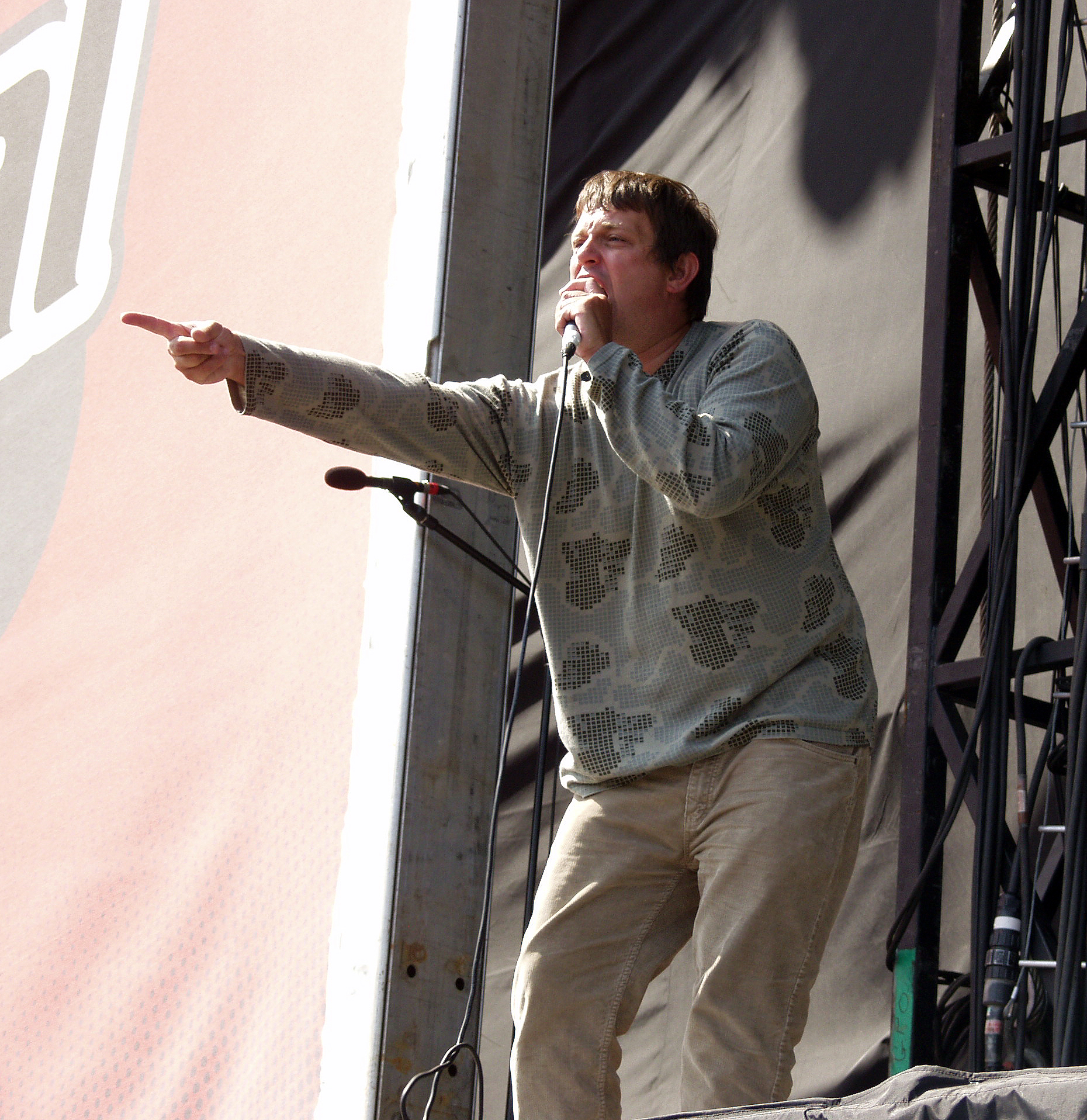
- Tom Hingley onstage in 2003

Background information
- Born: Thomas William Hingley; 9 July 1965 (age 61); Abingdon, Berkshire, England
- Genre: Indie
- Occupations: Musician; singer; songwriter
- Instruments: Vocals; guitar; banjo
- Years active: 1985–present
- Labels: Ugly Man; Mute; Newmemorabilia
- Website: tomhingley.co.uk

Thomas William Hingley (born 9 July 1965) is an English singer, songwriter and guitarist, best known as the frontman of Inspiral Carpets.

== Early life ==
Hingley was born in Abingdon, Berkshire (now Oxfordshire) and grew up in nearby Frilford. He is the seventh child of the Russian scholar Ronald Hingley, translator of Chekhov for Oxford University Press. He attended Larkmead School before moving to Manchester in 1984 to study English at Manchester Polytechnic.

== Career ==
Hingley formed a band called Too Much Texas, and got a job collecting glasses at The Haçienda nightclub in Manchester. He joined Inspiral Carpets as lead vocalist in 1989. Inspiral Carpets broke up in 1995 and Hingley started a career as a solo artist, releasing Keep Britain Untidy (2000) and Soulfire (2002), on his label Newmemorabilia Records. Inspiral Carpets later reformed in 2003 to promote their Greatest Hits and tour the UK.

Hingley finally parted company with Inspiral Carpets in February 2011, the band returned to performing and writing with their original pre-1989 singer Stephen Holt who remains their frontman to date. Hingley's memoir Carpet Burns, My life with Inspiral Carpets charts his time with the band from 1989 to 2011.

In 2001, Hingley formed the band The Lovers with Steve and Paul Hanley (both former members of The Fall), Jason Brown, and Kelly Wood. The Lovers' first album, Abba Are The Enemy, was released in 2004. In 2002–03, he joined a reformed Inspiral Carpets for two UK tours and again in 2006/2007.

His second album with the Lovers, Highlights, was released in March 2008. In August 2009 Hingley played the Rebellion Punk Festival in Blackpool. In 2009, Hingley released a new solo acoustic record on Newmemorabilia Records called Thames Valley Delta Blues, a kind of follow up to the earlier, much-acclaimed Keep Britain Untidy.

== Discography ==
=== Solo albums ===
- Keep Britain Untidy (2000)
- Soulfire (2001)
- Thames Valley Delta Blues (2009)
- Sand (2013)
- Paper (2013)
- Hymns for the hungry (2020)
- the grand mal (2024)

=== EP'S ===
- Happiness EP (2002)

=== With Mackay Hingley ===
- Decades (2023)

=== With Tom Hingley Band ===
- No Peace for the Good Looking (2014)
- I love my job (2018)

=== With Tom Hingley and The Lovers ===
- Work, Rest & Play (EP) (1997)
- "Yeah" (single) (2003)
- Abba Are The Enemy (album) (2004)
- Highlights (album) 2008

=== With Inspiral Carpets ===
Studio albums

- Life (1990)
- The Beast Inside (1991)
- Revenge of the Goldfish (1992)
- Devil Hopping (1994)

Compilation albums

- The Singles (1995)
- Radio 1 Sessions (1996)
- Greatest Hits (2003)
- Cool As (2003)
- Keep the Circle (2007)

VHS/DVD

- 21.07.90 Live at Manchester G-Mex VHS (1990)
- The Singles VHS (1995)
- Live at Brixton Academy DVD (2004)

EPs

- The Peel Sessions (1989)
- Cool As Fuck (1990)
- Island Head (1990)
- The Peel Sessions 1990 (1992)

==== Singles ====
Release date	Title	UK Single Chart	Album
1989, May	"Joe"	–	–
1989, August	"Find Out Why"	90	–
1989, November	"Move"	49	Life
1990, March	"This Is How It Feels"	14	Life
1990, June	"Commercial Reign" (U.S. release)	–	Life
1990, June	"She Comes in the Fall"	27	Life
1991, March	"Caravan"	30	The Beast Inside
1991, June	"Please Be Cruel"	50	The Beast Inside
1992, February	"Dragging Me Down"	12	Revenge of the Goldfish
1992, May	"Two Worlds Collide"	32	Revenge of the Goldfish
1992, September	"Generations"	28	Revenge of the Goldfish
1992, November	"Bitches Brew"	36	Revenge of the Goldfish
1993, May	"How It Should Be"	49	–
1994, January	"Saturn 5"	20	Devil Hopping
1994, February	"I Want You"	18	Devil Hopping
1994, April	"Uniform"	51	Devil Hopping
1995, September	"Joe"	37	The Singles
2003, July	"Come Back Tomorrow"	43	Cool As

=== With Too Much Texas ===
- Fixed Link (Flexi disk) (1986)
- Hurry on Down (1988) on Ugly Man
- Juvenilia (2006)

=== Collaborations ===
- Oliver Klein featuring Tom Hingley: Shakedown/Shakedub (EP) (2002)
