= Too Much Texas =

English indie rock band

- Origin: Manchester, England
- Genres: Indie rock
- Years active: 1984–1992, 2006
- Labels: Ugly Man; Newmemorabilia
- Past members: Tom Hingley; Raymond Breckon; Gordon MacKay; Laurence Ash

Too Much Texas were an English indie rock band, formed in 1984 in Manchester, best known as the band that Tom Hingley was in before joining Inspiral Carpets.

== History ==
The band formed in 1984 in Manchester, by singer Tom Hingley, who was studying English, along with fellow Abingdon natives Gordon MacKay and Raymond Breckon, all of whom worked part-time at The Haçienda nightclub as glass collectors. After a split flexi disc released with Debris magazine, they released their debut single proper, "Hurry on Down", on Ugly Man Records in 1988, and supported New Order, The House of Love and The Beloved.

Hingley joined Inspiral Carpets in 1989 and now fronts Tom Hingley and the Lovers and MackayHingley. The latter sees Tom Hingley reunited with Too Much Texas guitarist Gordon Mackay, along with Gordon’s son Angus on bass, Scott Bearman-Brown (drums and percussion), and multi-instrumentalist Ben Heaney (keys and violin). The band continued with a new singer, releasing the Smart EP in 1989, eventually splitting in 1992.

A retrospective collection, Juvenilia, was released in 2006 on Hingley's Newmemorabilia label, and the band re-formed for a UK tour.

== Band members ==
- Tom Hingley – vocals, guitar
- Raymond Breckon – bass
- Gordon MacKay – lead guitar
- Laurence Ash – drums
- Tim Ainsworth - drums
- Guy Ainsworth - drums vocals

== Discography ==
- "Fixed Link" (1986) – flexi disk, split with Soil
- "Hurry On Down" (1988), Ugly Man – 12" single
- Smart EP (1989), Playtime
- Juvenilia (2006), Newmemorabilia – CD
