= The Compact Guide to Pop Music and Space Travel =

Studio album by the Clint Boon Experience
- Released: 1999
- Recorded: UK
- Genre: Rock, indie
- Label: Artful
- Producer: Clint Boon

The Clint Boon Experience chronology
The Compact Guide to Pop Music and Space Travel (1999)	Life in Transition (2000)

The Compact Guide to Pop Music and Space Travel is the debut album by the Clint Boon Experience, which was the band formed by Inspiral Carpets organist Clint Boon in the late nineties. "White No Sugar" was released as a single, as were "You Can't Keep A Good Man Down" and "The Biggest Horizon".

== Critical reception ==
Professional ratings
Review scores
Source	Rating
AllMusic	3/5 stars

The Independent described the album (and the three singles included on it) as "spacey organ tempered with operatic blasts, and rocking good tunes... Crazy brilliant stuff."

== Track listing ==
1. "Presley on Oldham Street"
2. "Comet Theme Number One" featuring Alfie Boe (credited as Alf Boe)
3. "White No Sugar"
4. "Not Enough Purple, Too Much Grey"
5. "Only One Way I Can Go" featuring Alfie Boe (credited as Alf Boe)
6. "Tiger Woods: Astronaut"
7. "You Can't Keep a Good Man Down"
8. "This Night Will See Me Falling"
9. "Push Me Back Down"
10. "The Cool People Know Who the Cool People Are"
11. "The Biggest Horizon"
12. "Andy Gill: Astronaut"
