= Saturn V (disambiguation) =

The Saturn V is a type of multi-stage rocket used in the Apollo Moon missions.

Saturn V can also refer to:

- Rhea, a moon of Saturn designated Saturn V
- An alternative designation for the Centaur rocket stage
- "Saturn 5", a song on the Inspiral Carpets album Devil Hopping
