= Keep Britain Untidy =

Studio album by Tom Hingley
- Released: 7 December 2000
- Genre: Acoustic
- Label: Newmemorabila

Tom Hingley chronology
Keep Britain Untidy (2000)	Soulfire (2001)

Keep Britain Untidy is the first solo album from Tom Hingley, the ex-frontman of The Inspiral Carpets. The album is his first studio album since the split of Inspiral Carpets.

== Track listing ==
1. "Inside"
2. "The Silver and The Gold"
3. "Taste of You"
4. "Straight Into Your Heart"
5. "Between Us"
6. "Whole"
7. "Port In A Storm"
8. "You Don't Care About Tomorrow"
9. "All Night Long"
10. "Goodbye To The Lord Of My Life"
11. "What Can I Loose?"
