= The Rainkings =

- Genres: Alternative rock; indie rock
- Years active: 1989–1996; 2012–2018
- Labels: Playtime Records; Hear Here
- Members: Stephen Holt; Dave Swift; John Rowland; Cathy Brooks; Paul Williams
- Past members: Carl Wolstenholme; Nick Farr; Dave Pears; Manny Lee; Chris Hutchinson; Kev Clarke
- Website: www.rainkings.org

The Rainkings were an English indie rock band, formed in 1989 by former members of Inspiral Carpets and The Bodines.

== History ==
Stephen Holt had been the original singer in Inspiral Carpets, performing on their first few releases, including the Planecrash and Trainsurfing EP's plus the Dung 4 demo album. Holt left, along with Dave Swift in 1988, forming The Rainkings along with ex-Bodines drummer John Rowland, and bassist Carl Wolstenholme. The band released two singles on Playtime Records in 1989 and 1990.

Sictransitgloriaswanson was released in 1989 and featured the songs "Sunlight Fades", "Count Me In", "Break the Strain" and "Just An Idea".

Get Ready was released in 1990 and featured the songs "Get Ready", "Move Along the Chain" and "Too Many Words". The latter featured in the 2013 Spike Island film. The EP was also produced by Ian Broudie under the guise Kingbird Productions.

They also released the song "Take" for the Home compilation album in 1990 via Sheer Joy Records. This was recorded at Stockport's legendary Strawberry Studios.

Carl Wolstenholme was replaced on bass by Nick Farr not long after this and the band went on to record the Bolton Demo in 1992 which featured the songs "To the End", "Gone" and "This is the Time".

The final line up before splitting up in 1996 saw Manny Lee, ex Waltones, replace Nick Farr on bass and also saw the addition of lead guitarist Dave Pears. Their only recording was the Suite 16 demo in 1994 and featured the songs "Step by Step" and "Way Down".

"Way Down" appeared on the Simon Worral tribute album Distant Drums (2013).

The Rainkings reformed in December 2012 in anticipation of the release of the compilation album Another Time – 1989-1994 which was remixed and mastered by Seadna McPhail who has worked with bands including I Am Kloot, Thea Gilmore and Inspiral Carpets.

Original members Stephen Holt (who rejoined the Inspiral Carpets in 2011), Dave Swift and John Rowland were joined by bassist Cathy Brooks (Dub Sex) and Chris Hutchinson on keyboards/guitar. This line up of the band recorded 3 new songs — "Nothing's Set in Stone", "In From the Rain" and "By My Side".

Hutchinson left the band in 2014.

In 2015 the band recorded 2 new songs — "Low Hit" and "Getting Nowhere" with Paul Williams adding additional keyboards who then joined the band. These tracks were released that year alongside "Nothing's Set in Stone", "In From the Rain" and "By My Side" on the Fiveways EP, on Stephen Holt's label Hear Here Records.

The band released their 'final recording' "Searcher" on 18th February 2018, which followed the song "Good Times" which had been released the previous year.

== Discography ==
=== Singles ===
- Sictransitgloriaswanson EP (1989), Playtime (12")
1. Sunlight Fades
2. Count Me In
3. Break The Strain
4. Just An Idea
- Get Ready (1990), Playtime (7"/12"/CDS)
1. Get Ready
2. Move Along The Chain
3. Too Many Words
- Fiveways EP (2015), Hear Here Records (CD and Download)
1. Low Hit
2. Getting Nowhere
3. Nothing's Set In Stone
4. In From The Rain
5. By My Side

=== Compilation albums ===
- Another Time – 1989-1994 (2013), Playtime (compilation)
1. Get Ready
2. Gone
3. Sunlight Fades
4. Too Many Words
5. This Is The Time
6. Count Me In
7. Take
8. Move Along The Chain
9. Break The Strain
10. To The End
11. Just An Idea
12. Step By Step
13. Way Down

=== Compilation Appearances ===
- "Sunlight Fades" appeared on Hit The North compilation album (1990) Bop
- "Take" appeared on the Home compilation album (1990) Sheer Joy
- "To The End" appeared on the Movement compilation album (1993) ESP
- "Way Down" appeared on Distant Drums compilation album (2013)
- "Too Many Words" appeared in the film Spike Island (2013)
- "Get Ready" appeared on the Manchester North of England compilation album (2017) Cherry Red Records
