= Highlights (Tom Hingley and the Lovers album) =

Studio album by Tom Hingley and the Lovers
- Released: March 2008
- Recorded: 2005–2008
- Genre: Punk, indie
- Label: Newmemorabilia Records
- Producer: Paul O'Brien/The Lovers

Tom Hingley and the Lovers chronology
Abba Are The Enemy (2004)	Highlights (2008)

Highlights is the second album by Tom Hingley and the Lovers, who feature Inspiral Carpets singer Tom Hingley, Steve Hanley and Paul Hanley from Manchester band The Fall, Jason Brown and Kelly Wood. It was released in 2008.

== Track listing ==
All Songs written by J. Brown, P. Hanley, S. Hanley, T. Hingley, K. Wood.

1. "Kick out the Clocks"
2. "All of my Time"
3. "Let Go"
4. "No Easy Exit"
5. "Venomous"
6. "3AM"
7. Highlights
8. "I was Wrong"
9. "Both"
10. "Time is the Thief"
11. "Evergreen"
12. "Open up your Eyes"

== Personnel ==
Tom Hingley and the Lovers

- Tom Hingley - vocals
- Steve Hanley - bass
- Paul Hanley - drums, backing vocals
- Jason Brown - lead Guitar, backing vocals
- Kelly Wood - keyboards, piano, backing vocals

Guest musicians

- Denise Johnson - backing vocals (Tracks 1 & 10)
- Sam Morris - French horn (Track 8)
- Fabien Ferryman - backing vocals (Track 12)
