= Soulfire (Tom Hingley album) =

Studio album by Tom Hingley
- Released: February 1, 2001
- Genre: Indie Rock
- Label: Newmemorabila

Tom Hingley chronology
Keep Britain Untidy (2000)	Soulfire (2001)	Happiness EP (2002)

Soulfire is a solo album by Tom Hingley, the ex-frontman of Inspiral Carpets. The album released on February 1, 2001. The album is available from £8 and up on Bandcamp

== Track listing ==
1. "Happiness"
2. "Isolation Tank"
3. "Transparent"
4. "Inertia"
5. "Got You Love"
6. "Formal Tourist"
7. "Work Rest And Play"
8. "Manmade"
9. "Soul Fire"
10. "Broken Wings"
11. "Pimp"
