= Abba Are the Enemy =

Studio album by Tom Hingley and the Lovers
- Released: September 2004
- Recorded: 2002 – 2004
- Genre: Punk, Indie
- Length: 35:53
- Label: Newmemorabilia Records
- Producer: John Robb; Julian Gaskell

Tom Hingley and the Lovers chronology
Abba Are the Enemy (2004)	Highlights (2008)

Abba Are the enemy is the debut album by Tom Hingley and the Lovers, which features Inspiral Carpets singer Tom Hingley, Steve Hanley and Paul Hanley from Manchester punk band The Fall. It was released in 2004. The album was given a six out of ten rating by PopMatters, with reviewer John Bergstrom calling "Online Pharmacy" as a "Hendrix redux", and stating that Hingley sounds "like the bastard child of Paul Weller and Roger Daltrey".

== Track listing ==
All Songs written by Tom Hingley, Steve Hanley, Paul Hanley, Kelly Wood, Jason Brown, except "Hole" written by Tom Hingley. Lyrics on "No Way Out" by Kelly Wood.

No.	Title	Length
1.	"Temperamental Jimmy"	2:22
2.	"Online Pharmacy"	2:49
3.	"Yeah"	2:56
4.	"Hole"	2:32
5.	"Tattyfalarious"	2:38
6.	"No Way Out"	4:08
7.	"Boyband"	2:35
8.	"Big Mistake"	3:34
9.	"3145"	3:12
10.	"Third Cumming"	1:11
11.	"I Feel Old"	3:23
12.	"Perfect Body"	3:49
13.	"Online Pharmacy" (video)

== Personnel ==
Tom Hingley and the Lovers

- Tom Hingley - vocals, guitar
- Steve Hanley - bass, backing vocals
- Paul Hanley - drums, backing vocals
- Jason Brown - guitar, backing vocals
- Kelly Wood - Farfisa keyboard, melodica, synthesiser, vibraphone, backing vocals
