= Cow (demo) =

EP by Inspiral Carpets
- Released: 1987
- Recorded: May 1987
- Genre: Progressive rock, Madchester
- Length: 11:07

Inspiral Carpets chronology
Waiting for Ours (1987)	Cow (1987)	Dung 4 (1989)

Cow is a demo EP by the British rock group Inspiral Carpets. It was released in 1987.

It was reissued on 7-inch EP in 2014. The EP was included with the Dung 4 vinyl reissue. The tracks were also released on the CD version of Dung 4.

== Track list ==
1. Head for the Sun
2. Now You're Gone
3. Whiskey
4. Love Can Never Lose Its Own

"Head for the Sun" was re-recorded and released as a B-side to the "You're So Good for Me" single in 2012. "Whiskey" was re-recorded in 1989 during the Life sessions and appeared as a bonus track on the Japanese release of that album. It was also recorded as part of the band's first John Peel Session in 1988 and appears on the 2013 extended reissue of Life.
