= Life in Transition =

Studio album by The Clint Boon Experience
- Released: 2000
- Recorded: Beaumont Street, Huddersfield; Parr Street, Liverpool; Space Opera HQ; The Castle, Oldham, Lancashire, England
- Genre: Rock, indie
- Length: 53:57
- Label: Artful Records
- Producer: Clint Boon

The Clint Boon Experience chronology
The Compact Guide to Pop Music and Space Travel (1999)	Life in Transition (2000)

Life in Transition is the second album by The Clint Boon Experience, which is the band formed by Clint Boon in the late nineties. The album cover artwork features a photograph of Clint's son Max Presley Boon, who was 5 years old at the time.

Billboard magazine described the album as "a funky mix of sounds from the radio ready pop of Do What You Do (Earworm Song) to the bossonova style of Me I'm Just A Girl to the chaotic mod sounds of The Frankie Generation."

== Track listing ==
No.	Title	Length
1.	"This Is the Sound"	3:01
2.	"Life in Transition"	5:45
3.	"Climbing Back Inside the Dream"	3:24
4.	"Cool Vacation"	4:04
5.	"Do What You Do (Earworm Song)"	4:57
6.	"17 and Over"	5:18
7.	"Radio Fritz Cbx! Commercial"	0:34
8.	"Kids Get Kicks"	3:35
9.	"Me I’m Just a Girl"	5:05
10.	"The Frankie Generation"	5:45
11.	"It’s Always Summertime"	0:34
12.	"The Craziest Diamond"	2:38
13.	"Somewhere in Time"	6:14
14.	"In Chaos I See"	3:03

== Personnel ==
- Alf Boe - vocals
- Clint Boon - engineer, keyboards, mixing, percussion, producer, sampling, vocals
- Maegan Boon - vocals
- Fran Healy - vocals
- Tony Naylor - background vocals
- Richard Stubbs - acoustic guitar, bass guitar, background vocals
