= Inspiral Carpets (album) =

Studio album by Inspiral Carpets
- Released: 20 October 2014
- Recorded: 2011–2014
- Studio: Airtight (Chorlton)
- Genres: Alternative rock; indie rock
- Label: Cherry Red

Inspiral Carpets chronology
Devil Hopping (1994)	Inspiral Carpets (2014)

Inspiral Carpets is the fifth studio album by the English indie rock band of the same name, released on 20 October 2014. The album is their first in 20 years; and the first full-length album in the band's history to feature founding vocalist Stephen Holt, who replaced Tom Hingley following Hingley's departure from the band. It is also the band's final album with drummer Craig Gill, before his death in 2016.

It was announced in January 2014 on the official Inspiral Carpets web site. The track list was revealed in their July 2014 email newsletter. Despite initial announcements saying that both their non-album singles with Holt would be included, only "You're So Good for Me" made the final cut.

Professional ratings
Aggregate scores
Source	Rating
Metacritic	64/100
Review scores
Source	Rating
Record Collector	4/5 stars
MusicOMH	4/5 stars
The Quietus	Favourable
NME	(6/10)
Pitchfork	(4.2/10)

== Track listing ==
All tracks are written by Inspiral Carpets, except "Let You Down" written by Inspiral Carpets and John Cooper Clarke.

No.	Title	Length
1.	"Monochrome"	2:41
2.	"Spitfire"	3:51
3.	"You're So Good for Me"	3:35
4.	"A to Z of My Heart"	4:18
5.	"Calling Out to You"	3:23
6.	"Flying Like a Bird"	3:42
7.	"Changes"	3:08
8.	"Hey Now"	2:50
9.	"Our Time"	4:33
10.	"Forever Here"	3:35
11.	"Let You Down" (Featuring John Cooper Clarke)	5:58
12.	"Human Shield"	6:13

== Personnel ==
- Clint Boon – keyboards, backing vocals
- Craig Gill – drums
- Stephen Holt – lead vocals
- Graham Lambert – guitars
- Martyn Walsh – bass

== Charts ==
Chart (2014)	Peak position
Scottish Albums (Official Charts)	43
UK Albums (Official Charts)	63
UK Independent Albums (Official Charts)	12
