= Cool as Fuck =

EP by Inspiral Carpets
- Released: May 1990
- Recorded: February–September 1989; Square One
- Genres: Progressive rock, Madchester
- Length: 26:40

Cool as Fuck (printed on the sleeve as Cool as ****) is a 1990 5 track EP by the Manchester baggy group Inspiral Carpets. It is also a slogan featured on a series of the band's t-shirts, that were reputed to have sold more copies than their albums, combined.

It was released as a 12" LP, a CD and a cassette. The cassette had all 5 songs on both sides. The EP was only released in the US.

== Track listing ==
No.	Title	Length
1.	"Joe"	3:28
2.	"Find Out Why"	2:06
3.	"So Far"	2:11
4.	"Out of Time"	2:21
5.	"Plane Crash"	16:35
