= Sandy Skoglund =

American photographer

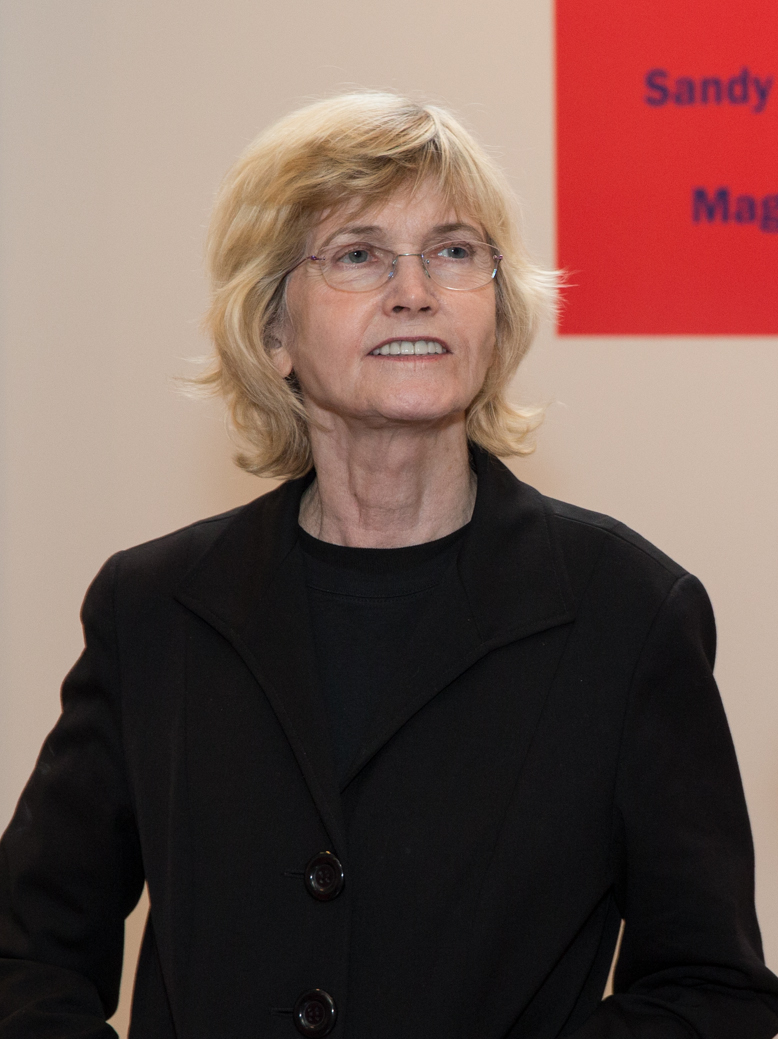
- Skoglund in 2013
- Born: September 11, 1946 (age 80); Weymouth, Massachusetts, U.S.
- Education: Smith College; University of Iowa
- Known for: Photography, Sculpture, Installation
- Notable work: Hangers (1979); Radioactive Cats (1980); Revenge of the Goldfish (1981); The Cocktail Party (1992); Raining Popcorn (2001)
- Movement: Conceptual art
- Website: http://www.sandyskoglund.com/

Sandy Skoglund (born September 11, 1946) is an American photographer and installation artist. Her contributions to photography have advanced the medium as a form of conceptual art. She is well known for her intricately designed environments, which utilize painterly and sculptural techniques within staged and performative scenes. Her contributions to photography have advanced the medium as a form of conceptual art, and she is considered to be one of the most influential artists working in staged photography. Skoglund's art has been the subject of numerous one person exhibitions and retrospectives, and is in the collections of major museums and arts institutions.

== Early life, education, and teaching ==
Skoglund was born in Weymouth, Massachusetts on September 11, 1946. At the age of 3, Skoglund and her younger brother were hospitalized and quarantined with polio on a ship anchored in Boston Bay.

She spent her childhood all over the United States including Massachuesetts, Maine, Connecticut, and California. Her summers were spent working various jobs, including the Space Bar in Disneyland's Tomorrowland and later decorating cakes on a Detroit bakery assembly line.

She studied both art history and studio art at Smith College in Northampton, Massachusetts, graduating in 1968. In 1967, she studied art history through her college's study abroad program at the Sorbonne and École du Louvre in Paris, France Studying art history at the Sorbonne ignited her interest in avant-garde cinema, especially Cahiers du Cinema and the French New Wave’s auteur theory.

After graduating from Smith, Skoglund taught middle-school art in Batavia, Illinois for a year before attending graduate school at the University of Iowa, where she studied painting, art conservation, filmmaking, multimedia art, and printmaking. In 1971, she earned her Master of Arts and in 1972 a Master of Fine Arts in painting from Iowa. Skoglund was an art professor at the University of Hartford between 1973 and 1976.

Skoglund held a faculty position at the Department of Arts, Culture and Media of Rutgers University–Newark in Newark, New Jersey. She retired from Rutgers in 2025.

== Conceptual art practice ==
In 1972, Skoglund began working as a conceptual artist in New York City. She taught herself photography in order to document her artistic endeavors, and experiment with the theme of repetition. She also became interested in advertising and high technology—trying to re-frame mass media aesthetics for a noncommercial purpose via combining the technical focus found in the commercial world and bringing that into the fine art studio. In an interview with curator Luca Panaro, she imparts that, "Mixing of the natural and the artificial is what I do everyday of my life, and I hope that I am not alone in this process." Skoglund's work at that time involved repetitive and accumulative gestures derived from a minimalist philosophy resulting in works that "made themselves" over time. Learning more about film techniques prompted her interest in advertising images and popular culture, which yielded Skoglund’s 1978 still life series of food. These images had titles like Peas on a Plate and Luncheon Meat on a Counter, which she described as "commercially uncommercial".

== Artistic style, and themes ==
Photography critic Andy Grundberg notes that Skoglund's work contains "all the hallmarks of the new attitude toward photographs: they embrace blatant artificiality; they allude to and draw from an 'image world' of endless preexisting photographs, and they reduce the world to the status of a film set."

Germano Celant, venerated art historian, observes: "The atmosphere that holds sway in Skoglund's installations is steeped in a sense of disorientation, of loss of the center and crisis of rationality.

Skoglund often creates meticulous and playful compositions by building elaborate sets or tableaux, and embellishing them with carefully selected hand-painted furniture, hand altered commercial and quotidian objects, as well as live models. She then photographs the set. These works are characterized by a formidable amount of one particular object, painterly mark-making, and either bright contrasting colors or a monochromatic color scheme.

Photo curator and historian Carol Squiers writes: "Skoglund sets up a series of tensions that the viewer must struggle to bridge. Most obviously, her work plays out the tension between two-dimensionality and three-dimensionality, between photography and sculpture." Squiers further notes: "Throughout her work Skoglund sets up a series of disquieting oppositions, among them visuality versus content, celebration versus critique, whimsy versus horror, the banal versus the extraordiinary, the dream versus the nightmare."

Food and animals are common elements in Skoglund's work. She explains the significance and allure to both food and animal imagery, stating that: "I think of Food as a universal language. Everyone eats. For the camera, food has colors and textures that can be manipulated to fabulous effect. I love the childish behavior of sculpting and painting with food. Food as a material allows me to explore the boundaries between nature and artifice...In my works with animals, I like to ask: who is looking at whom? I am especially interested in exploring consciousness as seen from a non-human perspective. Animal life presents people with a relief from themselves."

Curator Marvin Heiferman describes the impact of Skoglund's juxtaposition of commercial aspects, dramatization, and conceptual art elements by noting that, "The work simmers down and reminds viewers of their smallness in a big, overdetermined world where consumer culture, nature, science, and their interior gyroscopes regularly spin out of control." Grundberg also notes the serious effect of Skoglund's exuberant art, which "evoke adult fears in a playful, childlike context".

== Select notable artworks ==
=== Crumpled and Copied (1973) ===
The utilization of repetitive, process-oriented techniques began early on in Skoglund's career. Her 1973 composition Crumpled and Copied was manifested by repeatedly crumpling and photocopying a piece of paper.

=== The Holes in a Saltine Cracker (1974) ===
The Holes in a Saltine Cracker portrays how self-regulating repetition influences an object's aesthetic value. Photographing a single saltine cracker and then reproducing that image 77 times, resulted in a composition that became abstracted and obscured in accordance with the subtle mechanical shifts derived from the Xeroxing process.

=== Cubed Carrots and Kernels of Corn (1978) ===
In 1978, Skoglund expanded on this theme by producing a series of repetitive food item still life images. These photographs of food were presented in geometric and brightly colored environments so that the food becomes an integral part to the overall patterning, as in Cubed Carrots and Kernels of Corn, with its checkerboard of carrots on a white-spotted red plate placed on a cloth in the same pattern.

=== Hangers (1979) ===
Hangers features a composition of a man in yellow pajamas entering a dreamlike setting of rubber duckies, plastic chairs and blue plastic hangers arranged on a yellow wall. The staged photograph was created inside Skoglund's former tenement studio on Elizabeth Street in lower Manhattan. The work was initially displayed at the Castelli Gallery in the 1980s. In 2015, the Ryan Lee Gallery in New York City, presented a window installation of Hangers, which Skoglund recreated as a site-specific installation that was prominently on view for anyone walking along the High Line, which is adjacent to Gallery's window display. Every Saturday during the installation's run, a performer meandered around the space.

=== Radioactive Cats (1980) ===
One of Skoglund's best known works, titled Radioactive Cats (1980), features life-size, bright green-painted clay cats running amok in a gray kitchen. An older man sits in a chair with his back facing the camera while his elderly wife looks into a refrigerator that is the same color as the walls. The cats were sculpted using chicken wire and plaster. The kitchen is furnished with used furniture Skoglund acquired, and the man and woman that Skoglund used as models were her neighbors at the time. The end product is a very evocative photograph. In a 2013 online forum by the Getty Center for Education in the Arts, Terry Barrett and Sydney Walker identified two viable interpretations of Radioactive Cats. The first is about social indifference to the elderly and the second is nuclear war and its aftermath, drawing comparison to the Chernobyl disaster, and the highly documented dogs that survived the nuclear explosion and fallout.

=== Revenge of the Goldfish (1981) ===
Another well recognized composition of Skoglund's, is a fantastical arrangement featuring 119 handcrafted goldfish hovering above two people in bed late at night, called Revenge of the Goldfish (1981). The artwork was used as cover art for the Inspiral Carpets 1992 album, also titled Revenge of the Goldfish. Revenge of the Goldfish utilizes a variety of elements of art and design, including the juxtaposition of complementary colors, scale, and balance. All of these aspects contribute to the artworks' dramatic effect. The background consists of a monochromatic deep blue, which is reminiscent of both nighttime and the ocean. This blue is contrasted by bright orange goldfish floating through the room. Skoglund arranged the human models from a vantage point that makes their identities ambiguous to the viewer.

=== Maybe Babies (1983) ===
Skoglund's installation and staged photograph Maybe Babies features larger than life babies sculpted in clay, then cast in polyester resin. The babies are strewn across a sci-fi inspired landscape made from piles of black aquarium sand and old TV antennas painted with black and green stripes. In the May 1983 issue of Artforum, critic Charles Hagen describes the work as having, “The basic elements of a classic horror film…the threatening monsters from the Id mindlessly swarming Out There, just beyond the lamp-lit security of a middle-class home.”

=== “True Fiction One” and “True Fiction Two”(1985) ===
In 1985, Skoglund completed a series titled "True Fiction One". The process of creating the series incorporated the photomontage technique. Skoglund began by taking photographs of candid street and domestic scenes in black and white, later adding color to them in the darkroom. Then she cut and pasted pieces of the photographs into collaged compositions and rephotographed them using an 8 by 10 large format camera. In 2005, she revisited the series, this time utilizing digital tools like Photoshop to alter the images. The revamped series of compositions is called "True Fiction Two."

=== Sock Situation (1986) ===
For a Christmas display at Barneys New York department store, Skoglund set up a whimsical and stylish scene within a monochromatic green painted kitchen strewn with red socks. Three mannequins in tuxedos stand unyielding. The mannequin in the middle is holding a vacuum cleaner. The items used in the installation were chosen from merchandise on sale in the store.

=== Fox Games (1989) ===
Skoglund's Fox Games has a similar imaginative feel to Radioactive Cats. The composition envisions a restaurant scene where the tables, chairs, windows, chandelier, and food items are painted in grayscale. In the back corner of the dining room, two individuals are served by a waiter, while bright red foxes are depicted as being playfully in motion around the room.

=== The Cocktail Party (1992) ===
Skoglund's installation and staged photograph The Cocktail Party, is indicative of her sentiments about using food as raw artistic material. Each playfully employs an extensive amount of popular snack foods in order to create fantastical scenes that also address popular culture and history. In The Cocktail Party, Cheez Doodles preserved in Epoxy resin are affixed to human models and inanimate living room objects to create rich textural surfaces and a palette of mostly orange, but with slivers of purple to create a complementary color relationship. The piece is a witty commentary on the artificial nature of certain social gatherings.

=== Raining Popcorn (2001) ===
Raining Popcorn draws on Skoglund's experience living in Iowa, as a student at the University of Iowa, where she witnessed seemingly endless fields of corn. The work was commissioned by Grinnell College of Art in 2001, and was on view at the school's art museum from June 1 through September 16, 2001. It depicts a woodland composition where live models and the surrounding environment are enveloped in starch white popcorn. Skoglund researched the history of popcorn in the Americas from its Indigenous and colonial use in celebrations and rituals, to its more recent association as a snack of leisure and entertainment. The resulting composition is indicative of corn's complicated relationship to the history and progression of American culture.

=== Liquid Origins, Fluid Dreams (2002) ===
In 2002, Skoglund designed the men's bathroom for the Smith College Museum of Art, as an installation called Liquid Origins, Fluid Dreams. For this unique setting, she created and arranged symbolic motifs on ceramic tile based on mythology and folklore.

=== “The Project of the Four Seasons” (2008) ===
In 2008, Skoglund began a series of nature themed artworks, titled "The Project of the Four Seasons." The series includes the installations Fresh Hybrid and Winter. Fresh Hybrid is an artificial landscape, where organic materials like blades of grass and bark are replaced by pipe cleaners and wool fibers. The making of Winter began through the familiar process of installation and photography, but Skoglund eventually decided to create a work that was fully rendered digitally. She notes that: "With the theme of winter, I imagined snowflakes. Initially, I made them from clay, because I have experience with ceramics, and I liked the idea of fragility. I worked for two years on these, and then hated them. I experimented with materials. In the end I cut them digitally. In a certain sense, Winter is a completely digital work, but at the same time it exists physically."

=== “The Outtakes” (2020) ===
Skoglund at installation of Revenge of the Goldfish

In 2020, Skoglund discovered forgotten Kodak film boxes filled with alternative images of previously realized works that she considered to be failures. This series includes the composition Early Morning, which is an outtake of her iconic Revenge of the Goldfish.

== Exhibitions ==
Skoglund's work has been exhibited in prominent galleries and museums both in the United States and abroad. Notable venues include the Whitney Biennial, Saint Louis Art Museum, Leo Castelli Gallery, Galerie Guy Bärtschi, Centro Italiano per la Fotografia, and the McNay Art Museum.

Revenge of the Goldfish was featured in the 1981 Whitney Biennial, as well being exhibited Saint Louis Art Museum in 1981. Photographs of the artwork have been on view and collected by several institutions including, Smith College Museum of Art, which also owns the original installation.

In 1983, she presented her installation and photograph Maybe Babies at Leo Castelli's Manhattan gallery. The immersive installation of "Fox Games" was acquired by the Denver Art Museum in 1990 and has been installed and exhibited there multiple times.

In 1998, a retrospective of Skoglund's work titled "Reality Under Siege" toured to five museums: Smith College Museum of Art, March 12, 1998 - May 24, 1998; Cincinnati Art Museum, June 27, 1998 - August 23, 1998; Columbia Museum of Art, October 12, 1998 - January 3, 1999; Toledo Museum of Art, February 14, 1999 - May 2, 1999; Jacksonville Museum of Art, September 10, 1999 - November 7, 1999. The show comprised four installations as well as drawings, photographs and early examples of Skoglund's conceptual works.

In 2000, the Galerie Guy Bärtschi in Geneva, Switzerland held an exhibition of 30 works by Skoglund. The photographs ranged from her late 1970s series of plates on tablecloths to works from the 1980s and 1990s. A critic who reviewed the exhibition, Richard Leydier, commented that Skoglund criticism is littered with interpretations of all kinds, whether feminist, sociological, psychoanalytical or whatever. Skoglund has been nonchalant about how her work is read, while being forthcoming about the intent behind her work, saying, "What is the meaning of my work? For me, it's really in doing it."

The large room-sized installation of The Cocktail Party was acquired by the McNay Art Museum in 2011 and has been installed and exhibited there multiple times.

Another career retrospective of Skoglund's work was organized in 2019 at the Centro Italiano per la Fotografia in Turin, Italy. The title of the exhibition was Sandy Skoglund: Visioni Ibride, which translates to Hybrid Visions, a symbolic reference to her fusion of diverse media and imagery. The exhibition was curated by Germano Celant, who also published a comprehensive monograph on Skoglund's work from the 1970s to the present (2019).

Natural Havoc, a solo exhibition of select work from Skoglund's “Outtakes” series, as well as shadow boxes, drawings, and photographs was on view at RULE Gallery in Marfa, Texas from October 10 through November 29, 2025. Coinciding with the exhibition in Marfa, Skoglund's retrospective show Enchanting Nature at the McNay Art Museum in San Antonio, Texas, represents another important career survey for the artist. Enchanting Nature features some of Skoglund's most notable works of art including the room-sized installations Radioactive Cats, Revenge of the Goldfish, and Fresh Hybrid, the latter of which had not been exhibited before. A catalog was published in conjunction with the retrospective exhibition, including an introduction by chief curator Rene P. Barilleaux and an interview by Laura van Straaten.

=== Selected exhibitions ===
Important museum group shows have included Skoglund's work, such as:

- Another Avant-Garde: Photography 1970–2000, (2024). Works from the collection of the Pompidou Centre, exhibited at West Bund Museum, Shanghai, China.
- Feast For the Eyes, (2020). Aperture Foundation, N.Y., N.Y.
- Color: American Photography Transformed, (2013). Amon Carter Museum, Ft. Worth, Texas.
- Almost Warm and Fuzzy: Childhood and Contemporary Art, (1999). Des Moines Art Center, Des Moines, Iowa,
- Constructed Realities, The Art of Staged Photography, (1990). Museum of Contemporary Art, Munich, Germany
- L’Invention d’un Art, (The Invention Of An Art), (1989). Centre Georges Pompidou, Paris, France.
- Cross-References: Sculpture into Photography (1987). Walker Art Center, Minneapolis, Minnesota.
- Staged Photo Events, (1982). Neue Galerie-Sammlung Ludwig, Aachen, The Netherlands.

== Collections ==
Skoglund's works are held in numerous museum collections including

- Centre Georges Pompidou
- Fonds Nationale d'Art Contemporain
- Maison Europeene de la Photographie
- Dallas Museum of Art
- Lowe Art Museum
- Art Institute of Chicago
- Detroit Institute of Arts
- Joslyn Art Museum
- Metropolitan Museum of Art
- Museum of Fine Arts, Houston
- Princeton University Art Museum
- Tampa Museum of Art
- The Whitney Museum of American Art
- Brooklyn Museum,
- Denver Art Museum
- Museum of Contemporary Photography
- San Francisco Museum of Modern Art
- Nelson-Atkins Museum of Art
- McNay Art Museum
- St. Louis Art Museum
- High Museum of Art
- Getty Museum
- Smith College
- Grinnell College Museum of Art
- Dayton Art Institute.
