= Played (album) =

Studio album by the Bodines
- Released: 1987
- Label: Magnet
- Producer: Ian Broudie

Singles from Played
- 1. "Therese" Released: 1986; 2. "Skankin Queens" Released: 1987

Played is the sole studio album by English band the Bodines, released in 1987 by record label Magnet. It includes the two singles, "Therese" and "Skankin' Queens", which made it to the top 100 on the charts.

== Critical reception ==
Professional ratings
Review scores
Source	Rating
AllMusic	2.5/5 stars
Record Collector	3/5 stars

Mojo has praised the track "Therese" as the 37th greatest UK indie record ever.

== Track listing ==
All tracks are written by the Bodines:

Side one
No.	Title	Length
1.	"Skankin' Queens"	3:26
2.	"What You Want"	3:06
3.	"Scar Tissue"	3:38
4.	"Tall Stories"	3:05
5.	"Clear"	2:23

Side two
No.	Title	Length
6.	"Untitled"	2:40
7.	"Therese"	3:08
8.	"Slip Slide"	3:26
9.	"The Back Door"	2:41
10.	"William Shatner"	3:45
