= Greatest Hits (Inspiral Carpets album) =

Compilation album by Inspiral Carpets

Inspiral Carpets Greatest Hits

Greatest hits album by Inspiral Carpets
- Released: 2003
- Recorded: UK
- Genre: Indie rock
- Length: 74:40
- Label: Mute – Dung 32
- Producer: Inspiral Carpets

Inspiral Carpets chronology
Cool As (2003)	Inspiral Carpets Greatest Hits (2003)	Keep the Circle (2007)

Inspiral Carpets Greatest Hits is a compilation album by British band Inspiral Carpets. It was released by Mute Records in the latter part of 2003; it is essentially the first CD from the Cool As box set issued earlier that same year.

== Track listing ==
1. "Keep the Circle Around" – 3:49
2. "Butterfly" – 2:33
3. "Joe" – 3:22
4. "Find Out Why" – 2:03
5. "Move" – 3:26
6. "This Is How it Feels" – 3:13
7. "She Comes in the Fall" – 4:11
8. "Biggest Mountain" – 4:29
9. "Weakness" – 4:17
10. "Caravan" – 5:48
11. "Please Be Cruel" – 3:37
12. "Dragging Me Down" – 4:33
13. "Two Worlds Collide" – 4:41
14. "Generations" – 2:49
15. "Bitches Brew" – 3:51
16. "How It Should Be" – 3:17
17. "Saturn 5" – 3:58
18. "I Want You" – 3:09
19. "Uniform" – 3:54
20. "Come Back Tomorrow" – 3:40

== Charts ==
Chart (2004)	Peak position
Scottish Albums (Official Charts)	94

== Certifications ==
Region	Certification	Certified units/sales
United Kingdom (BPI)	Silver	60,000^{‡}
^{‡} Sales+streaming figures based on certification alone.
