= Tompaulin =

Indie pop bands

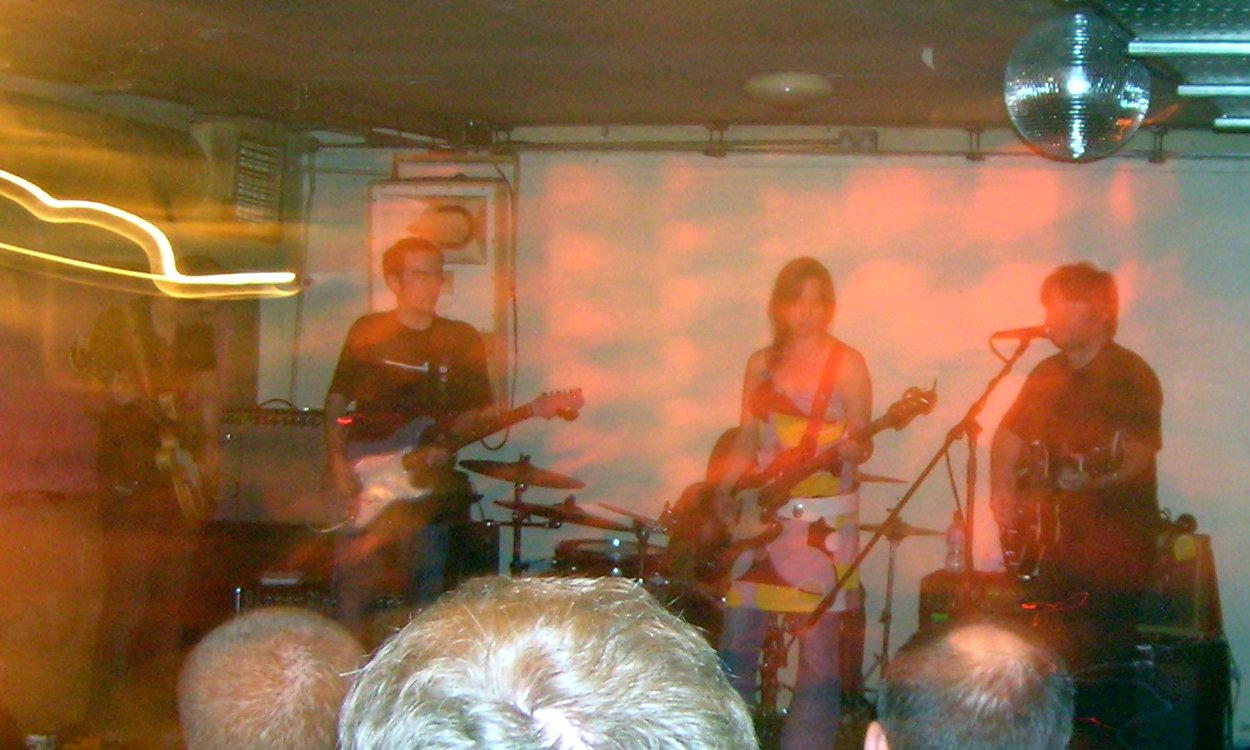
- Tompaulin playing at RoTa, Notting Hill, 13 August 2005

Background information
- Origin: Blackburn, Lancashire, England
- Genres: Indie pop
- Years active: 1999 - c.2007
- Labels: Action, Track & Field, Ugly Man
- Past members: Stacey McKenna; Simon "Tap" Trought; Jamie Holman; Ciaron Melia; Amos Memon; Katie Grocott; Giles Cooke; Lee Davies

Tompaulin were an indie pop band formed in Blackburn, Lancashire, England in 1999, and named after the Northern Irish poet, critic, and lecturer Tom Paulin.

The band initially comprised Stacey McKenna (vocals), Simon "Tap" Trought (guitar), Jamie Holman (vocals/guitar/words), and Ciaron Melia (drums), although the line-up changed several times with other members including Amos Memon (drums), Katie Grocott (bass), Giles Cooke (banjo/guitar), and Lee Davies (keyboards). The band released five singles on the Action Records, Track & Field, and Ugly Man labels, before the release of their debut album, The Town and the City in 2001. The album was called "amazingly self-assured, confident and among the best releases of 2001" by Flak magazine. The band were often compared to Belle & Sebastian, and their music was described by Kitty Empire in the NME as "equal parts beguiling and entertaining", while The Times described them as "exactly the right balance between grim reality and the chord sequences that lift you out of it". A further single followed on Track & Field in 2002, and the band went on to release two further albums on the label before splitting up.

The band recorded two sessions for John Peel's BBC Radio 1 show, in 2000 and 2001.

== Discography ==
=== Singles ===
- "Ballad of the Bootboys" (1999) Action
- Carcrash EP (2000) Action
- "Slender" (2000) Action
- "It's a Girl's World" (2001) Track & Field
- "My Life at the Movies" (2001) Ugly Man
- "Give Me a Riot in the Summertime" (2002) Track & Field

=== Albums ===
- The Town and the City (2001) Ugly Man
- Into the Black (2005) Track & Field
- Everything was Beautiful and Nothing Hurt (2006) Track & Field
