= The Bodines =

British rock group

Background information
- Origin: Glossop, Derbyshire, England
- Genres: Indie pop
- Years active: 1985–1990
- Labels: Creation; Magnet; Playhard

The Bodines were a British pop group from the mid to late 1980s that comprised guitarist Paul Brotherton, bassist Tim Burwood, drummer John Rowlands, and guitarist/vocalist Michael Ryan.

In 2023, Mojo magazine ranked the song "Therese" as the 37th greatest UK indie record ever, calling it "a breathless romantic gulp of twin guitar twirl."

== History ==
The Bodines, consisting of Mick Ryan, Paul Brotherton, Tim Burtonwood and Paul Lilley, emerged from Glossop, Derbyshire, England, in 1985. Fronted by the floppy-fringed Ryan, they became one of the better-known outfits from a crop of jangly indie bands that sprang up around that time. They made their debut with "God Bless", an early release by Creation Records. Shortly afterwards, Lilley was replaced on drums by John Rowland. Two further singles followed; their second, "Therese", was included on the C86 compilation album. Like their contemporaries Primal Scream, The Mighty Lemon Drops and The Weather Prophets, the Bodines went on to sign up with a major label with great hopes of transferring their success to the mainstream charts. The group joined Magnet Records, where a remix of "Therese" became their major label debut.

In July 1986, the Bodines participated in the Festival of the Tenth Summer. The Bodines's debut album, Played (produced by Ian Broudie, later to enjoy success as a recording artist as the Lightning Seeds) scraped into No. 94 in the UK Albums Chart, in the summer of 1987. The "Therese" and "Skankin' Queens" singles peaked at numbers 76 and 89 respectively in the UK Singles Chart. Under pressure for failing to deliver the hit record that their major label backers required, the Bodines split up, albeit temporarily. Rowland went on to play with the Rainkings.

In 1989, a reformed line-up of Ryan, Brotherton, new bassist Ian Watson, and new drummer Spencer Birtwistle released the single "Decide" on Manchester's Play Hard label and contributed a further new track to the same label's Hand to Mouth compilation. A couple of years later, Ryan reappeared with a new band called Medalark Eleven (misnamed after Harlem Globetrotters' Meadowlark Lemon), assisted by Gareth Thomas on bass and Adrian Donohue on drums. Reunited with Creation Records, they released a couple of singles ahead of the album Shaped Up, Shipped Out in 1994.

On 23 August 2010, the Bodines' debut album Played was reissued with seven bonus tracks on the Cherry Red label.

== Discography ==
Chart placings shown from UK Indie Chart.

=== Singles ===
Year	Title	Format	Label	Catalog number	Chart placing	Notes
1986	"God Bless"	7"	Creation	CRE 016	No. 8	
1986	"Therese"	12", 7"	Creation	CRE 028T, CRE 028	No. 4	Reissued on Magnet (1987, BODT1, BOD1)
1986	"Heard It All"	12", 7"	Creation	CRE 030T, CRE 030	No. 4	
1987	"Skankin Queens"	12", 7"	Magnet	BODT2, BOD2		
1987	"Slip Slide"	12", 7"	Magnet	BODT3, BOD3		
1989	"Decide"	12"	Play Hard		No. 15	
2007	"Shrinkwrap"	CD	Firestation	FST 073		

=== Albums ===
- Played (1987, Magnet Records, BODL 2001)

=== Compilation appearances ===
- NME C86 Compilation NME 22 Contributed "Therese". 1986
- It's Different for Domeheads Creation CRELP 5 Contributed "Paradise"
- Record Mirror 12". Free release with the Record Mirror Magazine on Ensign RM6. Contributed "Back Door (live)" 1986
- Flowers in the Sky 1984–1987 Creation CRELP 028 CD Contributed "God Bless"
- Creation Soup Volume 2 Creation CRECD 102 (on vinyl as CRELP 102) Contributed "God Bless", "Paradise"
- Creation Soup Volume 3 Creation CRECD 103 (on vinyl as CRELP 103) Contributed "William Shatner"
- Hand To Mouth Playhard Contributed "Hard On" and "Call Your Name"

=== Other releases ===
- "William Shatner" Canadian Live Bootleg (7") Label Unknown BODX1 This was free with BODT1

== Personnel ==
Core line-up

- Michael Ryan – vocals, guitar
- Paul Brotherton – guitar
- Tim Burwood – bass guitar
- John Rowland – drums

Other members

- Paul Lilley – drums
- Ian Watson – bass guitar
- Spencer Birtwistle – drums
- Andrew "Booty" Boot – guitar
