= Keep the Circle: B-Sides and Udder Stuff =

Keep the Circle: B-sides and Udder Stuff

Compilation album by Inspiral Carpets
- Released: 26 February 2007
- Recorded: 1986–2003
- Genre: Indie rock
- Length: 131:52
- Label: Mute Records
- Producer: Inspiral Carpets

Inspiral Carpets chronology
Greatest Hits (2003)	Keep the Circle: B-sides and Udder Stuff (2007)	Inspiral Carpets (2014)

Keep the Circle: B-sides and Udder Stuff is a compilation of b-sides from Oldham-based band Inspiral Carpets, released in February 2007 to coincide with their short tour of the UK. The album is only available as a digital download from iTunes and other download services.

It contains a previously unheard version of "Saturn 5" with guest vocals by Mark E. Smith of The Fall. Also included is an hour-long interview with the group discussing most of the songs.

Some of these songs were released on Rare As, the second disc of the Cool As collection in 2003.

== Track listing ==
1. "Garage Full of Flowers" (Debris flexi version) – 3:46
2. "Commercial Reign" – 4:40
3. "Directing Traffic" – 2:37
4. "So Far" – 2:12
5. "Planecrash" – 16:37
6. "Out of Time" – 2:22
7. "Move In" – 5:49
8. "Tune for a Family" – 2:55
9. "Seeds of Doubt" – 1:54
10. "Goldtop" (Who's Sane Mix) – 3:38
11. "Goldtop" – 6:30
12. "I'll Keep It In Mind" – 3:18
13. "Skidoo" – 7:01
14. "St. Kilda" – 4:10
15. "The Wind is Calling Your Name" – 4:31
16. "St. Kilda" (Instrumental) – 4:08
17. "I Know I'm Losing You" – 6:34
18. "Boomerang" – 5:28
19. "Lost in Space Again" – 5:26
20. "It's Only a Paper Moon" – 5:52
21. "I'm Alive" – 4:58
22. "Saturn 5" (featuring Mark E. Smith) – 3:59
23. "Well of Seven Heads" – 4:41
24. "Two Cows" – 1:52
25. "Going Down" – 3:24
26. "We Can Do Everything" – 3:23
27. "Inside of You" – 3:32
28. "Cobra" (Satanic Wurlie mix) – 2:45
29. "Uniform" (Scripka Mix) featuring strings by the Balanescu Quartet – 3:50
30. "Probably the First Digital Spine Message in the World Ever" – 54:26 (interview track – title refers to the group's habit of putting brief messages on the spines of their record sleeves)
