= The Clint Boon Experience =

English alternative rock band

The Clint Boon Experience (stylised as The Clint Boon Experience!, also known as CBX) are an English alternative rock band formed by ex-Inspiral Carpets keyboard player Clint Boon after Inspiral Carpets disbanded in the mid-1990s.

== Background ==
Boon formed The Clint Boon Experience in 1998. They supported Travis, performing in Belfast in December 1999, then returning as headliners in February 2000.

The band were one of the earliest to exploit the internet, having a website and an email list.

They released two albums: The Compact Guide to Pop Music and Space Travel and Life in Transition, under the independent record label, Artful Records.

== The band ==
- Clint Boon – keyboards (Farfisa), lead vocals
- Matt Hayden – guitar
- Richard Stubbs – bass guitar
- Tony Thompson – drums and percussion
- Kathryn Stubbs – trumpet

Also guest appearances for:

- Alfie Boe – extra vocals
- Sara Cluderay – extra vocals
- Fran Healy – guest vocalist on "Do What You Do (The Earworm Song)". Boon described this song as his "masterpiece".

Boe performed vocals on both albums, and a number of the singles. Cluderay toured regularly with the band, and performed extra vocals on the single version of "The Biggest Horizon".

In addition he has members of his family perform on his albums, in particular his former wife Maegan, plus a few spoken words from his daughter. Maegan also wrote the group's newsletter.

== Discography ==
=== Studio albums ===
- 1999 The Compact Guide to Pop Music and Space Travel
- 2000 Life in Transition

=== Singles ===
- 1999 "Only One Way I Can Go"
- 1999 "Comet Theme No.1"
- 1999 "You Can't Keep a Good Man Down"
- 1999 "White No Sugar" UK No. 61
- 2000 "Biggest Horizon" UK No. 70
- 2000 "Do What You Do (Earworm Song)" UK No. 63
