= Thames Valley Delta Blues =

Studio album by Tom Hingley
- Released: 2009
- Genre: Acoustic
- Label: Newmemorabila

Tom Hingley chronology
Happiness EP (2002)	Thames Valley Delta Blues (2009)

Thames Valley Delta Blues is a 2009 album by Tom Hingley.

== Track listing ==
1. "Waiting For The Walls To Come Down"
2. "All The Good Things"
3. "The Gloves Are Off"
4. "Thirst Born"
5. "Good"
6. "The Lake Of Fire"
7. "Did You See That Girl"
8. "Don't Want To Be A Fighter Any More"
9. "Everyday"
10. "Love You In The Morning"
11. "Love Week"
12. "Northern Star"
13. "The Gun"
14. "She"
15. "Tiny Babies"
