= Ugly Man Records =

- Founded: 1986
- Founder: Andrew and Guy Lovelady
- Distributors: Red Rhino Records, APT, Shellshock
- Genre: Independent Music
- Country of origin: United Kingdom
- Location: Bootle, Merseyside

Ugly Man Records is a British independent record label based in Rhos on Sea, Wales, originally in Manchester. It released debut singles for many Manchester bands, including Elbow, the Man From Delmonte and I Am Kloot. It was set up in Bootle, Merseyside in 1986 with the release of "Wonderful Life" by the Liverpool-based singer Black, which reached number 72 in the UK Singles Chart, before going on to greater success when reissued by major label A&M.

== Previously on Ugly Man Records ==
Artists who have worked with Ugly Man Records

- Bathymetry
- Black
- Bone-Box
- Mustafa Kamal Qureshi
- The Spitting Pips
- Grown Up Strange
- The Danny Boys
- Man From Delmonte
- Gayna Rose Madder
- The Desert Wolves
- Dub Sex
- The County Fathers
- Ambitious Beggars
- Too Much Texas
- Fallover 24
- Jylt
- Arthur Magee
- I Am Kloot
- Elbow
- Sleepwalker
- Loafer
- LazyEye
- The Jade Assembly
- Bryan Glancy
- Indigo Jones
- Silverman
- The Milk & Honey Band
- Josephine Oniyama
- Vinny Peculiar
- Tompaulin
- Monomania
- Sandbox
- Sandy Kilpatrick
- Shakedown Stockholm
- Jimmy & the Revolvers
- Echolines

== See also ==
- List of record labels
- List of independent UK record labels
