= Winston Swift Boyer =

American photographer (1854-)

Winston Boyer
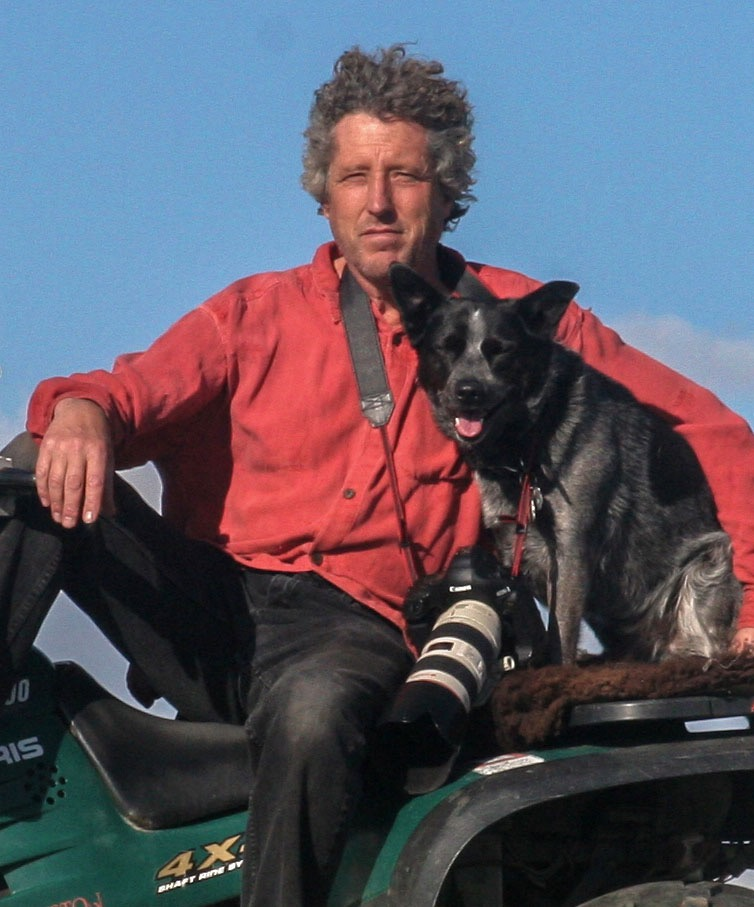
- Boyer in 2011
- Born: Winston Swift Boyer; June 25, 1954 (age 72); Great Falls, Montana, US
- Education: Stevenson School (high school graduate)
- Known for: Landscape photography
- Relatives: Jacques Boyer (brother)
- Website: winstonboyer.com

Winston Swift Boyer (born June 25, 1954) is an American fine art photographer living in Carmel-by-the-Sea, California, and is best known for his color photography of landscapes in the United States and Europe.

== Early life ==
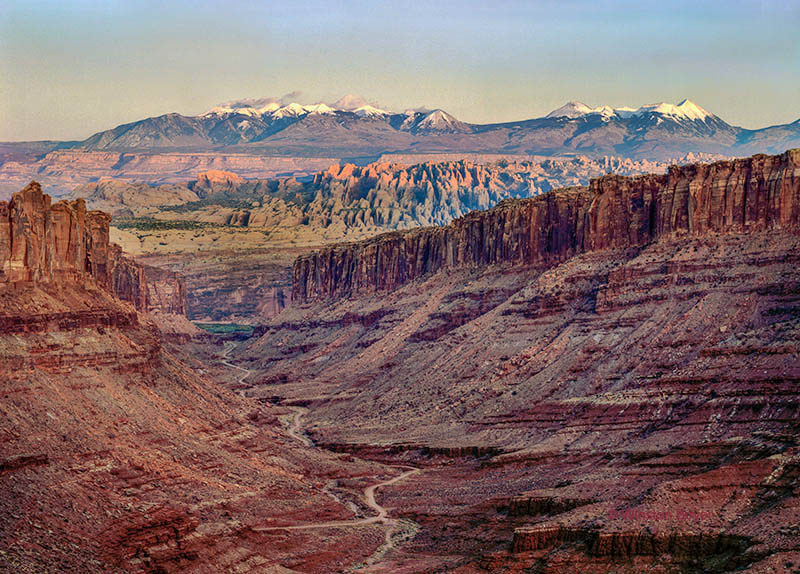
Boyer's photo of La Sal Mountains, Moab, Utah

He is the son of Winston Philip Boyer and Josephine Swift. In 1972, Boyer graduated from Robert Louis Stevenson School in Pebble Beach.

== Career ==
In 1974, Boyer moved to France and was hired as a sports photographer covering bicycle racing. During 1977, Boyer traveled around Europe, documenting the Tour de France for cycling magazines. He compiled a collection of photographs of European landscapes, peoples, and architecture, and held numerous exhibitions in American and European galleries.

Boyer's first one-man show was at the Lakey Gallery, in Carmel-by-the-Sea, California in 1979. Boyer was described as one of six Master Printmakers in "The Artistry of Master Printmakers", a chapter in Color, a volume of the Life Library of Photography (Time/Life Books, 1981). The book contains two full-page photographs by Boyer, Night Angel, a twilight photograph of an apartment building from Nice, France, and California Coastal Vista from Morro Bay, California. These photos were also published in the magazine Camera 35 (1981) along with a 1-page biographical overview that said when making landscapes, Boyer used two 35mm Leicas, 5 lenses and no tripod, and he did his own printing.

In the mid-1980s, Boyer took 64 photographs for the book American Roads published by Little, Brown and Company

Boyer was a senior photography director for an early online editorial fashion e-magazine called Fashionlines, from the late 1990s to the early 2000s. His portfolio includes the Ocean Series, Mask Series, American Landscape, Vertigo Series, Cannery Row, American Facades, The Views, European Gallery, and Eritrea, Africa. While living on Garrapata Ridge in Big Sur for fourteen years, his Ocean Series evolved into large-scale photographs of the sea, sky, and clouds, often at sunset, from vantages in and near Big Sur.

In 2015, Boyer travelled to Eritrea, where he photographed the people, landscapes, and architecture including the Hamasien Hotel, Fiat Tagliero Building, large hand-painted signs, street wall murals, Modernist architecture, and handmade terraces. The work was published as a piece called "Inside Eritrea: from tank cemeteries to futuristic architecture-in pictures" by The Guardian.

Boyer's work is included in the permanent collections of the Art Institute of Chicago, the Brooklyn Museum, the Corcoran Gallery of Art, the Monterey Museum of Art, the Stanford Museum, the Fresno Art Museum, and the Crocker Art Museum.

According to California Elegance Portraits from the Final Frontier (2021), Boyer has been known for his landscapes and surreal tableaux.

== Personal life ==
Boyer lives in Carmel-by-the-Sea, California, with his wife Kathleen.

== Select publications ==
- — (1989). American Roads. Boston: Bulfinch Press/Little, Brown. ISBN 9780821217085. OCLC 19786578.

== See also ==
- Color photography
