= Tom Hingley and the Lovers =

British rock band

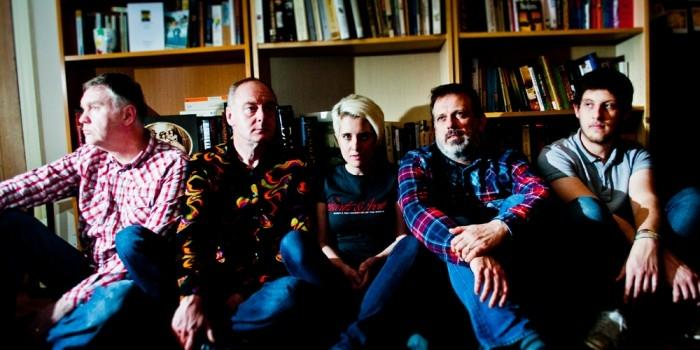
- Tom Hingley and the Lovers, 2012

Background information
- Origin: Manchester, England
- Genres: Alternative rock
- Years active: 1997–2013, 2023
- Labels: Newmemorabilia
- Members: Tom Hingley; Steve Hanley; Paul Hanley; Kelly Wood; Jason Brown; Rahman Baloch; Andrew Tarling
- Website: www.thelovers.co.uk

Tom Hingley and the Lovers were a British alternative rock band formed by singer Tom Hingley (of Inspiral Carpets), brothers Steve Hanley (bass guitar) and Paul Hanley (drums) (both former members of The Fall), keyboardist Kelly Wood and guitarist Jason Brown. Brown was initially replaced by Rahman Baloch and Andrew Tarling joined on guitar in 2012 for their final dates. In September 2022 the band announced they were briefly reforming with Jason Brown back on guitar for two performances: 3 2023 February AATMA in Manchester and 4 February at the 100 Club in London.

Their first album, Abba Are The Enemy, was released in 2004. The follow-up, Highlights, was released in March 2008.

== Former members ==
- Tom Hingley – vocals (2001–2013. 2023–)
- Steve Hanley – bass (2001–2013. 2023–)
- Paul Hanley – drums (2001–2013. 2023–)
- Kelly Wood – keyboards (2001–2013. 2023–)
- Jason Brown – guitar (2001–2011. 2023–)
- Rahman Baloch – guitar (2011)
- Andrew Tarling – guitar (2012–2013)

== Discography ==
- "Yeah" (single) – Newmemorabilia – 2003
- Abba Are The Enemy – Newmemorabilia – 2004
- Highlights – Newmemorabilia – 2008

== Compilation tracks ==
- "Isolationtank" on Happiness by Tom Hingley, 2001, FFVinyl
- "Online Pharmacy" on Shake (VA), 2004, Biff Bang Pow
- "Boyband" on Out of the Blue (VA), 2004, Blue Cat

== Interviews ==
- Abba, Ken Dodd and Chris Martin – enter the world of The Lovers (BBC Interview + Audio), 2004
- Loving it (BBC Interview with Tom Hingley), 2006
