= Dung 4 =

Demo album by Inspiral Carpets
- Released: May 1989
- Recorded: 29–31 December 1987
- Genre: Indie rock, Madchester
- Length: 30:13; 41:24 (2014 vinyl reissue)
- Label: Cow; Cherry Red (2014 CD/vinyl reissue)

Inspiral Carpets chronology
Cow (1987)	Dung 4 (1989)	Life (1990)

Dung 4 is a demo album by the British indie rock band Inspiral Carpets. It was first released in May 1989 on Inspiral Carpets' own Cow Records and only on cassette. The name refers to the catalogue number.

In 2014, it was announced that Dung 4 would be re-released on vinyl and CD on Cherry Red Records on 19 and 28 April respectively, with the contents of Inspiral Carpets' earlier demo EP Cow, as bonus tracks. On the LP version, Cow was included as a bonus 7-inch EP, while on the CD its tracks were appended to the end of the Dung 4 program. A second vinyl reissue of Dung 4 was released on the Tiger Bay label in Europe, containing the entire contents of both demos on a single album. In promotion of the reissue, Clint Boon stated that he considered Dung 4 to be the band's debut album, even though various outlets classified it as a demo album.

== Track listing ==
1. Keep The Circle Around
2. Seeds Of Doubt
3. Joe
4. Causeway
5. Inside My Head
6. Sun Don't Shine
7. Theme From Cow
8. Butterfly
9. 26
10. Garage Full Of Flowers
11. 96 Tears
12. Head For The Sun *
13. Now You're Gone *
14. Whiskey *
15. Love Can Never Lose Its Own *

* Bonus tracks from LP and CD reissues. Note that on the 2018 LP reissue, "Sun Don't Shine" and "Causeway" were moved to the beginning of the B-side.

The version of "Joe" on this album was previously released on the Manchester, North of England compilation album in 1988.

== Personnel ==
- Clint Boon - keyboards, backing vocals
- Craig Gill - drums
- Stephen Holt - lead vocals
- Graham Lambert - guitars
- Dave Swift - bass

== Charts ==
Chart (2014)	Peak position
UK Independent Albums (OCC)	38
