= Life (Inspiral Carpets album) =

Studio album by Inspiral Carpets
- Released: 23 April 1990
- Recorded: September 1989
- Studio: Out of the Blue; North American bonus tracks: July 1990; Jacobs
- Genre: Madchester
- Length: 40:00 (original UK LP issue); 43:28 (original UK CD and MC issues); 57:54 (original US issue); 55:15 (original Japanese issue); 76:03 (2013 extended reissue)
- Label: Mute
- Producer: Inspiral Carpets, Nick Garside

Inspiral Carpets chronology
Dung 4 (1989)	Life (1990)	The Beast Inside (1991)

Singles from Life
- 1. "Move" Released: 1990; 2. "This Is How It Feels" Released: 1990; 3. "She Comes in the Fall" Released: 1990; 4. "Commercial Rain" Released: 1990 (US-only release)

Professional ratings
Review scores
Source	Rating
AllMusic	4/5 stars
Chicago Tribune	2.5/4 stars
Entertainment Weekly	C+
NME	8/10
The Virgin Encyclopedia of Eighties Music	3/5 stars

Life is the debut studio album by the British indie rock band Inspiral Carpets. It was released on 23 April 1990 by Cow Records, through Mute Records, during the period dubbed Madchester by the British media. The group released three singles from this album: "Move", "This Is How It Feels" and "She Comes in the Fall", with the latter two in different versions from those found on the album.

It was reissued in 2013 with the PlaneCrash and TrainSurfing EPs and an unreleased John Peel session as bonus tracks, plus the 21790 live video on a bonus DVD. The 2013 reissue is based on the original UK CD release.

A slightly modified version of Life was released in North America. It dropped the track "Besides Me" and added "Commercial Rain" (a re-recorded version of a B-side to the "Joe" single) and three tracks from their then-forthcoming Island Head EP.

== Track listing ==
All tracks are written by Inspiral Carpets.

Original UK, Europe and Australia LP release
No.	Title	Length
1.	"Real Thing"	3:10
2.	"Song for a Family"	3:03
3.	"This Is How It Feels"	3:05
4.	"Directing Traffik"	3:54
5.	"Besides Me"	2:24
6.	"Many Happy Returns"	3:07
7.	"Memories of You"	2:15
8.	"She Comes in the Fall"	4:41
9.	"Monkey on My Back"	1:59
10.	"Sun Don't Shine"	3:35
11.	"Inside My Head"	2:01
12.	"Sackville"	6:43

Bonus track on UK, Europe and Australia CD and cassette editions and Latin American vinyl editions
No.	Title	Length
12.	"Move"	3:26
13.	"Sackville"	6:43

Japanese CD bonus tracks
No.	Title	Length
14.	"Whiskey"	2:18
15.	"Tune for a Family"	2:53
16.	"Seeds of Doubt"	1:51
17.	"This Is How It Feels" (Extended mix)	4:44

Original North American CD release
No.	Title	Length
1.	"Real Thing"	3:10
2.	"Song for a Family"	3:03
3.	"Commercial Rain"	4:43
4.	"This Is How It Feels"	3:05
5.	"Directing Traffik"	3:54
6.	"Many Happy Returns"	3:07
7.	"Memories of You"	2:15
8.	"She Comes in the Fall"	4:41
9.	"Monkey on My Back"	1:59
10.	"Sun Don't Shine"	3:55
11.	"Inside My Head"	2:01
12.	"Move"	3:26
13.	"Weakness"	4:16
14.	"Biggest Mountain"	4:27
15.	"I'll Keep It in Mind"	3:12
16.	"Sackville"	6:43

Extended Edition bonus tracks (14-18 from PlaneCrash EP, 19-22 from TrainSurfing EP, 23-26 from Peel Session 17788)
No.	Title	Length
14.	"Keep the Circle Around"	3:48
15.	"Theme from Cow"	1:49
16.	"Seeds of Doubt"	2:04
17.	"Garage Full of Flowers"	2:14
18.	"96 Tears"	2:38
19.	"Butterfly"	2:33
20.	"Causeway"	2:57
21.	"You Can't Take the Truth"	2:43
22.	"Greek Wedding Song"	2:42
23.	"So Far"	2:12
24.	"Monkey on My Back"	1:58
25.	"Greek Wedding Song"	2:32
26.	"Whiskey"	2:24

=== Singles ===
1. Dung 6 – "Move" b/w Out Of Time/Move In (1989) (UK #49)
2. Dung 7 – "This Is How It Feels" b/w Tune For A Family/Seeds Of Doubt/Whiskey (1990) (UK #14)
3. Dung 10 – "She Comes in the Fall/Commercial Reign/Sackville" triple A-side (1990) (UK #27)
4. Dung 11 — “Island Head EP” Biggest Mountain/Gold Top/Weakness/I'll Keep It In Mind (1990) (UK #21)

== Personnel ==
- Clint Boon – organ, backing vocals
- Craig Gill – drums
- Tom Hingley – lead vocals
- Graham Lambert – guitars
- Martyn Walsh – bass guitar

== Charts ==
Chart (1990)	Peak position
Australian Albums (ARIA)	140
New Zealand Albums (RMNZ)	22
UK Albums (OCC)	2

Chart (2021)	Peak position
Scottish Albums (OCC)	51
UK Independent Albums (OCC)	22

== Certifications ==
Region	Certification	Certified units/sales
United Kingdom (BPI)	Gold	100,000^{^}
^{^} Shipments figures based on certification alone.
