= Cool As =

Greatest hits album by Inspiral Carpets
- Released: 2003
- Recorded: 1988–1995
- Genre: Indie rock
- Label: Mute – Dung 30
- Producer: Inspiral Carpets

Inspiral Carpets chronology
Inspiral Carpets Radio 1 Sessions (1996)	Cool As (2003)	Greatest Hits (2003)

Cool As is an album by British band Inspiral Carpets. It was released in 2003 as a three disc set with the first CD featuring all the band's singles including new song 'Come Back Tomorrow', and the second disc features early rare songs and B-sides. The final disc was a DVD with promotional videos, live footage and a band interview.

== Track listing ==
=== CD 1: Cool As ===
1. "Keep the Circle Around" – 3:49
2. "Butterfly" – 2:33
3. "Joe" – 3:22
4. "Find Out Why" – 2:03
5. "Move" – 3:26
6. "This Is How It Feels" – 3:13
7. "She Comes in the Fall" – 4:11
8. "Biggest Mountain" – 4:29
9. "Weakness" – 4:17
10. "Caravan" – 5:48
11. "Please Be Cruel" – 3:37
12. "Dragging Me Down" – 4:33
13. "Two Worlds Collide" – 4:41
14. "Generations" – 2:49
15. "Bitches Brew" – 3:51
16. "How It Should Be" – 3:17
17. "Saturn 5" – 3:58
18. "I Want You" – 3:09
19. "Uniform" – 3:54
20. "Come Back Tomorrow" – 3:40

=== CD 2: Rare As ===
1. "Theme from Cow"
2. "Seeds of Doubt"
3. "Garage Full of Flowers"
4. "96 Tears"
5. "You Can't Take the Truth"
6. "Greek Wedding Song"
7. "Causeway"
8. "Directing Traffic"
9. "Sackville"
10. "Commercial Reign"
11. "Skidoo"
12. "Tainted Love"
13. "Paper Moon"
14. "I Don't Want to Go Blind"
15. "Paranoid (Sort Yer Head Out Mix)
16. "Iron"
17. "You've Got What it Takes"

=== DVD: Spool As ===
==== Promo Videos ====
1. "Joe"
2. "Find Out Why"
3. "Move"
4. "This Is How It Feels"
5. "She Comes in the Fall"
6. "Biggest Mountain"
7. "Commercial Reign (U.S. video)
8. "Caravan"
9. "Please Be Cruel"
10. "Dragging Me Down"
11. "Two Worlds Collide"
12. "Generations"
13. "Bitches Brew"
14. "How it Should Be"
15. "Saturn 5"
16. "I Want You"
17. "Uniform"
18. "Come Back Tomorrow"

==== Live from G-MEX ====
1. "Real Thing"
2. "Besides Me"
3. "Sackville"
4. "Song for a Family"
5. "The Beast Inside"
6. "She Comes In the Fall"
7. "Grip"

==== Interview ====
1. Band Interview 11/02/2003

=== Singles ===
1. Dung 31 – "Come Back Tomorrow" (2003)

== Charts ==
Chart (2003)	Peak position
Scottish Albums (Official Charts)	52
UK Albums (Official Charts)	65
