= The Beast Inside =

Studio album by Inspiral Carpets
- Released: 22 April 1991
- Studios: Ridge Farm, Surrey
- Genres: Indie rock, Madchester
- Length: 56:11
- Label: Mute
- Producer: Chris Nagle

Inspiral Carpets chronology
Life (1990)	The Beast Inside (1991)	Revenge of the Goldfish (1992)

Singles from The Beast Inside
- 1. "Caravan" Released: 18 March 1991; 2. "Please Be Cruel" Released: 1991

The Beast Inside is the second studio album from British indie rock band Inspiral Carpets. It was released on 22 April 1991 on Mute Records.

The album made the Top 10 in the United Kingdom.

== Critical reception ==
Professional ratings
Review scores
Source	Rating
AllMusic	3/5 stars
The Encyclopedia of Popular Music	3/5 stars
Entertainment Weekly	C+
MusicHound Rock: The Essential Album Guide	2/5 stars
The Rolling Stone Album Guide	3/5 stars
Select	4/5

The Rolling Stone Album Guide called the album "a leap forward," writing that "Sleep Well Tonight" "recalled the Velvets at their most Teutonically romantic." Trouser Press called it "a misbegotten attempt at formula- tinkering that broadens the band’s dynamic net but doesn’t pull anything worthwhile in." The Los Angeles Times wrote that The Beast Inside "bears plenty of beat-heavy ecstasy, as well as sounds o’ the ‘60s (notably Clint Boon’s swirling organ)." The Chicago Tribune wrote that "few of the tunes are immediate powerhouses, but as the Carpets maintain their garage-rock energy while keeping the soundscapes changing ... they provide their eventual, if minor, rewards."

== Track listing ==
LP: Cow Records / DUNG 14 (UK)

1. "Caravan" (4:17)
2. "Please Be Cruel" (3:38)
3. "Born Yesterday" (5:23)
4. "Sleep Well Tonight" (5:10)
5. "Grip" (3:16)
6. "Beast Inside" (5:09)
7. "Niagara" (7:10)
8. "Mermaid" (4:29)
9. "Further Away" (13:38)
10. "Dreams Are All We Have" (4:01)
- also released on CD (DUNG 14 CD) and MC (DUNG 14 MC)

== Personnel ==
- Clint Boon – organ, backing vocals
- Craig Gill – drums
- Tom Hingley – lead vocals
- Graham Lambert – guitars
- Martyn Walsh – bass

== Charts ==
Chart (1991)	Peak position
Australian Albums (ARIA)	157
UK Albums (Official Charts)	5

Chart (2021)	Peak position
Scottish Albums (Official Charts)	76
UK Independent Albums (Official Charts)	37

== Certifications ==
Region	Certification	Certified units/sales
United Kingdom (BPI)	Silver	60,000^{^}
^{^} Shipments figures based on certification alone.
