= Devil Hopping =

- Cover photography by Peter Ashworth

Studio album by Inspiral Carpets
- Released: 7 March 1994
- Recorded: Parr Street (Liverpool)
- Genre: Indie rock
- Length: 44:38
- Label: Mute
- Producer: Pascal Gabriel

Inspiral Carpets chronology
Revenge of the Goldfish (1992)	Devil Hopping (1994)	Inspiral Carpets The Singles (1995)

Singles from Devil Hopping
- 1. "Saturn 5" Released: 10 January 1994; 2. "I Want You" Released: 21 February 1994; 3. "Uniform" Released: 25 April 1994

Devil Hopping is the fourth studio album from British indie band Inspiral Carpets, released on 7 March 1994 via Mute Records. The single version of "I Want You" features vocals by Mark E. Smith of the Fall. Mute dropped the band after the release of Devil Hopping.

The title of the album came from producer Pascal Gabriel's pronunciation of the word "developing."

== Critical reception ==
Professional ratings
Review scores
Source	Rating
AllMusic	3.5/5 stars
Chicago Tribune	3/4 stars
The Encyclopedia of Popular Music	3/5 stars
MusicHound Rock: The Essential Album Guide	1/5 stars
NME	8/10

The Chicago Tribune wrote that "with driving guitars and Martyn Walsh's booming bass lines, Devil Hopping edges toward a punchier rock sound." Trouser Press wrote that "the nearly lifeless music is at best self-parodic; the lyrics are hopelessly trite."

== Track listing ==
All tracks by Inspiral Carpets.

=== LP: Cow Records / DUNG 25 (UK) ===
1. "I Want You" – 3:10
2. "Party in the Sky" – 3:52
3. "Plutoman" – 4:15
4. "Uniform" – 3:54
5. "Lovegrove" – 3:18
6. "Just Wednesday" – 3:43
7. "Saturn 5" – 3:59
8. "All of This and More" – 3:32
9. "The Way the Light Falls" – 4:55
10. "Half Way There" – 3:50
11. "Cobra" – 2:13
12. "I Don't Want to Go Blind" – 4:03
- also released on CD (DUNG 25 CD)

=== LP: Cow Records / LDUNG 25 (UK) ===
Contains track listing as above, plus a red vinyl 10" featuring the following tracks:

1. "Saturn 5 (Peel Session)" – 3:50
2. "I Want You (Peel Session)" – 3:01
3. "The Way the Light Falls (Peel Session)" – 4:35
4. "Party in the Sky (Peel Session)" – 3:42
- Peel Sessions first broadcast on 13 December 1993.
- also available on CD (LDUNG 25 CD)

== Singles ==
- Dung 23 - "Saturn 5" (1994)
- Dung 24 - "I Want You" (w/ Mark E. Smith) (1994)
- Dung 26 - "Uniform" (1994)

== Personnel ==
Inspiral Carpets

- Clint Boon – keyboards, backing vocals
- Craig Gill – drums
- Tom Hingley – lead vocals
- Graham Lambert – guitars
- Martyn Walsh – bass

Technical personnel

- Peter Ashworth – photography
- Dave Buchanan – assistant
- Pascal Gabriel – producer, mixing
- Inspiral Carpets – producer
- Lewis Mulatero – photography
- Sleeve design – Mark Neal & Bill Smith, Bill Smith Studio
- Clif Norrell – engineer, mixing

== Charts ==
Chart (1994)	Peak position
Australian Albums (ARIA)	180
Scottish Albums (OCC)	12
UK Albums (OCC)	10

Chart (2022)	Peak position
Scottish Albums (OCC)	35
UK Independent Albums (OCC)	17
