= Clint Boon =

English musician, DJ and radio presenter

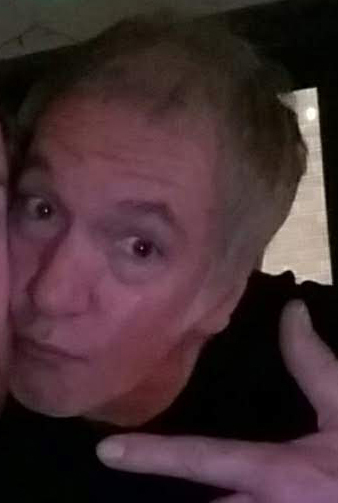
- Boon in 2019

Background information
- Born: Clinton David Boon; 28 June 1959 (age 66); Oldham, England
- Genres: Rock; indie
- Occupations: Musician; DJ; producer; engineer
- Instruments: Keyboards; percussion; vocals
- Years active: 1986–present
- Website: Clint Boon official site

Clinton David Boon (born 28 June 1959) is an English musician, DJ and radio presenter. Boon originally rose to fame as the keyboard player (and sometimes vocalist) of Inspiral Carpets.

== Music career ==
Born in Oldham, Lancashire, Boon joined the Inspiral Carpets in 1986 after previously playing in a band called The Mill. After the Inspiral Carpets split in 1995, Boon went on to form The Clint Boon Experience releasing two albums under this name – The Compact Guide to Pop Music and Space Travel (1999), and Life in Transition (2000).

In this year the band released the single "Do What You Do (Earworm Song)", which featured Fran Healy.

== Media career ==
Boon made a cameo appearance in the 2002 film 24 Hour Party People as a train conductor and also worked with Cosgrove Hall providing music for the Engie Benjy cartoon series.

In 1995, Boon began working for Liverpool's Crash FM after being recruited by DJ Janice Long and has also stood in for DJ Terry Christian on Century FM in Manchester.

In 2005, Boon became head of music of the Oldham-based radio station The Revolution, where he presented the 10 am to 2 pm weekday show. In 2006, he left the station for its then rival Xfm Manchester, where he began presenting the drivetime show. The following year Boon received two Sony Award nominations for his XFM show in the Music Broadcaster and Specialist Music Programme categories. Boon has a cult following, with regular listeners to his show being unofficially enrolled in the Boon Army. In 2015, Xfm Manchester transitioned into Radio X and began broadcasting nationally; Boon then hosted a Sunday evening show between 7 pm and 11 pm. It was shortened to 8 pm to 11 pm from 23 April 2016. His last show was on 19 March 2017.

He has been a resident DJ on Saturday nights at the club South in Manchester for 15 years, while also hosting other nights around the UK.

In 2016, Boon began presenting a 1980s music show on BBC Radio Manchester on Saturdays between 6 pm and 8 pm. He left the station in 2017, and started a new drivetime radio show #ThatsGoodInnit at XS Manchester. On 22 December 2023, Boon finished his final radio programme and retired from radio broadcasting.

Since 1 March 2026, Boon has presented a Sunday night show on Absolute Radio.

== References in popular culture ==
In 2008 Boon had his portrait painted by Manchester-based artist Adam Hayley. The portrait represents many aspects of Boon's life and incorporates references to his Manchester roots. The portrait was unveiled at Manchester's Mooch Art Gallery on Oldham Street, in the Northern Quarter. Subsequently, Adam Hayley donated the painting to the Boon family.

== Charity work ==
In 2013, Boon became patron of SiMBA, a charity supporting parents who have lost a very young baby, following the death of his daughter, Luna Bliss, who was born prematurely in April 2012 at St Mary's Hospital in Manchester and died 34 days later.

Boon's middle son Hector wanted to raise money for the hospital and was sponsored to have his long hair cut with the fundraising appeal becoming known as Hector's Fund. The Boon family continue to raise money for St. Mary's and to date Hector's Fund has raised £40,000 and paid for custom-made mother and baby feeding chairs for the hospital.

In January 2015, Boon launched a campaign to recruit runners to take part in the 10K Great Manchester Run to raise money for the Royal Manchester Children's Hospital Charity and the Saint Mary's Hospital Charity's Neonatal Intensive Care Unit. Members of the public were invited to sign up and run as part of the Boon Army to raise sponsorship money for the charities.

== Discography ==
The Clint Boon Experience

- The Compact Guide to Pop Music and Space Travel (1999)
- Life in Transition (2000)

Inspiral Carpets

- Life (1990)
- The Beast Inside (1991)
- Revenge of the Goldfish (1992)
- Devil Hopping (1994)
- Inspiral Carpets (2014)
