= This Is How It Feels =

1990 single by Inspiral Carpets

Single by Inspiral Carpets

from the album Life
- Released: 5 March 1990
- Length: 3:09
- Label: Mute; Cow
- Songwriter: Inspiral Carpets
- Producers: Inspiral Carpets; Nick Garside

Inspiral Carpets singles chronology
"Move" (1989)	"This Is How It Feels" (1990)	"She Comes in the Fall" (1990)

"This Is How It Feels" is a song by English rock band Inspiral Carpets. Written by the band, it was their first single to enter the UK top 40, peaking at number 14. It also reached number 149 on the Australian ARIA Singles Chart and number 22 on the US Billboard Modern Rock Tracks chart.

== Composition ==
The song tells the story of a working class mother, involved in an extramarital affair, which resulted in her lover's suicide (the lover's suicide is only hinted at in the single edit). Meaning, she is unable to reveal the reason for her grief, without also revealing the affair. The second verse of this song was changed for the radio edit. The original lyrics for the first and third line were: "There's a funeral in the town" and "Seems they found him under a train" respectively. However, in the radio version, they are as follows: "Black car drives through the town" and "Left a note for a local girl." The edit was most likely made because the original version's lyrics were in reference to suicide. The radio version also has eight bars of music before the first verse, compared to four bars on the album version.

Since the Carpets' reunion in 2022, the song has been sung live using the radio lyrics.

== Music video ==
The music video was directed by Anton Corbijn and was filmed on the Snake Pass between Sheffield and Manchester during a cold January.

== Track listings ==
7-inch

1. "This Is How It Feels"
2. "Tune for a Family"

12-inch and CD

1. "This Is How It Feels" (extended)
2. "Tune for a Family"
3. "This Is How It Feels" (radio edit)
4. "Seeds of Doubt"

Cassette

1. "This Is How It Feels" (extended)
2. "Tune for a Family"
3. "This Is How It Feels" (radio edit)
4. "Whiskey"

== Charts ==
Chart (1990–1991)	Peak position
Australia (ARIA)	149
Europe (Eurochart Hot 100)	35
UK Singles (Official Charts)	14
US Modern Rock Tracks (Billboard)	22

== Certifications ==
Region	Certification	Certified units/sales
United Kingdom (BPI)	Silver	200,000^{‡}
^{‡} Sales+streaming figures based on certification alone.

== Release history ==
Region	Date	Format(s)	Label(s)	Ref.
United Kingdom	5 March 1990	7-inch vinyl; 12-inch vinyl	Mute; Cow	
Australia	30 April 1990	7-inch vinyl; 12-inch vinyl; cassette	Mute; Cow	
