= Revenge of the Goldfish =

Studio album by Inspiral Carpets
- Released: 5 October 1992
- Studio: Amazon (Liverpool); Windings (Wales); Konk (London)
- Genre: Dance rock
- Length: 43:23
- Label: Mute
- Producer: Pascal Gabriel

Inspiral Carpets chronology
| The Beast Inside (1991) | Revenge of the Goldfish (1992) | Devil Hopping (1994) |

Singles from Revenge of the Goldfish
- 1. "Dragging Me Down" Released: 17 February 1992; 2. "Two Worlds Collide" Released: 18 May 1992; 3. "Generations" Released: 7 September 1992; 4. "Bitches Brew" Released: 2 November 1992

Revenge of the Goldfish is the third studio album by the English band Inspiral Carpets. It was released on 5 October 1992 through Mute Records. The band supported the album by touring with Sunscreem.

The album's cover art is a (cropped) 1981 photograph of an installation by contemporary artist Sandy Skoglund, also titled Revenge of the Goldfish.

== Critical reception ==
Professional ratings
Review scores
| Source | Rating |
|---|---|
| AllMusic | 4/5 stars |
| Calgary Herald | C+ |
| Chicago Tribune | 2/4 stars |
| Los Angeles Times | 3/4 stars |
| NME | 8/10 |
| Q | 4/5 stars |

The Toronto Star wrote that the album "returns to the punk-tinged sounds and loose feel of the Inspirals' debut, Life." The Chicago Tribune opined that "singer Tom Hingley bogs things down with his syrupy, overwrought vocals." The Los Angeles Times noted the "reverb-heavy guitars, grinding organs and brooding lyrics."

== Track listing ==
All songs written by Inspiral Carpets

1. "Generations" – 2:44
2. "Saviour" – 3:36
3. "Bitches Brew" – 3:43
4. "Smoking Her Clothes" – 3:36
5. "Fire" – 3:24
6. "Here Comes the Flood" – 3:50
7. "Dragging Me Down" – 4:30
8. "A Little Disappeared" – 2:48
9. "Two Worlds Collide" – 4:25
10. "Mystery" – 3:12
11. "Rain Song" – 4:42
12. "Irresistible Force" – 2:53

== Singles ==
1. Dung 16 – "Dragging Me Down" (1992)
2. Dung 17 – "Two Worlds Collide" (1992)
3. Dung 18 – "Generations" (1992)
4. Dung 20 – "Bitches Brew" (1992)

== Personnel ==
- Clint Boon – keyboards, backing vocals
- Craig Gill – drums
- Tom Hingley – lead vocals
- Graham Lambert – guitars
- Martyn Walsh – bass

== Charts ==
Chart performance for Revenge of the Goldfish
| Chart (1992–1993) | Peak position |
|---|---|
| Australian Albums (ARIA) | 123 |
| UK Albums (OCC) | 17 |

| Chart (2022) | Peak position |
|---|---|
| Scottish Albums (OCC) | 30 |
| UK Independent Albums (OCC) | 15 |
