= Inspiral Carpets =

English rock band

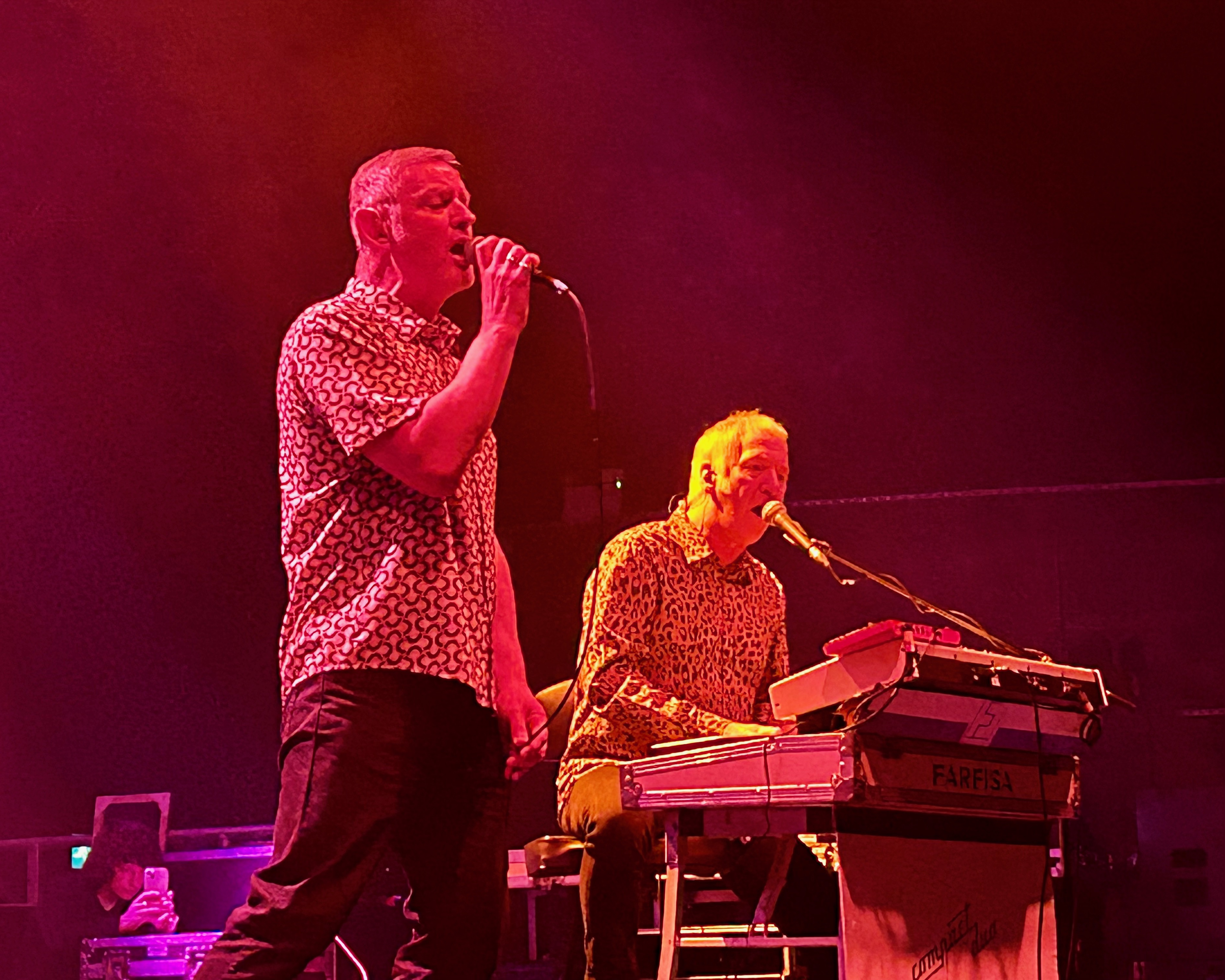
- Inspiral Carpets performing at the Victoria Warehouse in Old Trafford, 2024

Background information
- Also known as: The Furs (1980–1983)
- Origin: Oldham, England
- Genres: Alternative rock; indie rock; alternative dance; Madchester; garage rock
- Years active: 1983–1995; 2003–2016; 2022–present
- Labels: Mute; Elektra; Cherry Red
- Members: Graham Lambert; Stephen Holt; Clint Boon; Martyn Walsh
- Past members: Tony Feeley; Tony Welsh; Mark "Joe" Jordan; Mark Hindley; Chris Goodwin; Craig Gill; Rick Garage; Mark Hughes; Scott Carey; Beanland Claggett; Dave Swift; Tom Hingley
- Website: inspiralcarpets.com

Inspiral Carpets are an English rock band, part of the late-1980s/early-1990s Madchester movement and known for using organs and distorted guitars with influences from psychedelic rock. The band was formed in Oldham in 1983; its most successful line-up featured frontman Tom Hingley, drummer Craig Gill, guitarist Graham Lambert, bassist Martyn Walsh, and keyboardist Clint Boon.

Going by The Furs, Lambert formed line-ups loosely with various past band members from 1980 to 1983 until he and singer Stephen Holt met at The Moor End indie disco in Oldham in 1983. Holt sang on the first two independent singles. Holt departed the band before they signed with Mute Records. In 2011, Hingley departed the band, though members disagree about the circumstances. The band continued, reuniting with Holt. Inactive since Gill's death in 2016, the band announced on 17 October 2022 that they would be re-forming and going on a tour of the UK in March and April 2023.

== History ==
=== Early years (1983–1995) ===
Graham Lambert experimented with line-ups from 1980 to 1983, going by The Furs, until he and Stephen Holt, a friend from their school days, formed Inspiral Carpets in 1983, originally as a garage rock- and punk-inspired band. Manchester drummer Chris Goodwin and bassist Tony Welsh helped record a demo and play live in and around the Oldham area. Due to Goodwin's commitments, the band recruited 14-year-old drummer Craig Gill in 1986. Tony Welsh also had other music commitments and departed in 1986. The band then had a succession of bass players (Rick Garage, Mark Hughes, Scott Carey) before Dave Swift, on bass and organist Clint Boon (at whose Ashton-under-Lyne studio the band had been rehearsing). The band released two albums of demos in the 1980s, Waiting for Ours and Songs of Shallow Intensity, including songs that would later be re-recorded.

Inspiral Carpets came to prominence along with bands such as the Stone Roses and Happy Mondays in the Madchester scene of the late 1980s. The band first appeared on a flexi-disc with "Garage Full of Flowers" that was given free with Manchester's Debris magazine in 1987. Their first proper release, the Cow cassette, soon followed. The 1988 Planecrash EP on the Playtime label received much airplay from Radio 1 DJ John Peel, who asked the band to record a session for his show. The band reworked their single "Find Out Why" as the theme song for the show 8:15 from Manchester.

As the band's popularity grew, Playtime's distributor Red Rhino Records went bankrupt, leading Inspiral Carpets to form their own label, Cow Records, in March 1989. The label's first release was the Trainsurfing EP. With half of the first album, Life, written, Holt and Swift departed and formed the Rainkings, so the band recruited Too Much Texas singer Tom Hingley and Martyn "Bungle" Walsh of The Next Step to replace them. Martyn Walsh became the band's 13th bass player. After a handful of singles on their own label, with "Move" nearly reaching the UK top 40, the band signed a deal with Mute Records and soon experienced their first top-40 chart success in the UK with "This Is How It Feels." The single reached No. 14 on the singles chart, and the debut album Life reached No. 2 on the albums chart in 1990.

The following year's The Beast Inside was less well received by critics, but still achieved a top-5 album chart ranking. The "Caravan" and "Please be Cruel" singles only reached No. 30 and No. 50 respectively, and an attempt to crack the American market largely failed. However, the band gained a strong following in Portugal, Germany and Argentina, where the 1992 album Revenge of the Goldfish became their most successful. The album peaked at number 17 in the UK and spawned four UK hit singles. The next album, Devil Hopping (1994), reached number 10 in the album chart, with "Saturn 5" and "I Want You" (featuring Mark E. Smith) as top-20 hits. The next single, "Uniform", stalled at No. 51 and in 1995, after the release of a Singles collection, the band were dropped by Mute and split up soon after.

During this time Noel Gallagher was a roadie for the band, until he joined Oasis.

=== Post-split activities (1995–2003) ===
Hingley formed a new band, the Lovers, along with Jerry Kelly of the Lotus Eaters (which later featured Steve and Paul Hanley of the Fall), while Boon formed the Clint Boon Experience, releasing a string of singles on the Artful label. Gill also formed a new band, Hustler, who eventually changed their name to Proud Mary after a song by Creedence Clearwater Revival. Proud Mary signed to Noel Gallagher's Big Brother label some years later, while Walsh moved into production, largely working on techno and dance music. Two of the band's roadies enjoyed musical success themselves: van driver Mark Collins joined the Charlatans in 1991 and drum technician Noel Gallagher joined Oasis.

In 1999, Strange Fruit Records released a compilation of tracks recorded for BBC Radio 1 sessions.

=== Re-formation (2003–2011) ===
Inspiral Carpets reunited in 2003, playing to sellout crowds on tour and releasing the single "Come Back Tomorrow" (recorded in 1995) and a number of new compilation records, most notably the Cool As box set. The band have toured sporadically since, reuniting again in 2007 to tour in support of an iTunes-exclusive compilation of their B-sides and rarities. They played a tour in 2008 under the banner "Return of the Cow", announcing that their own Cow Records label was to be revived.

=== Hingley departs, Holt returns and Gill's death (2011–2016) ===
In February 2011, it was revealed that Tom Hingley was no longer part of the band, with the circumstances of his departure unclear. Band members indicated that Hingley had left of his own accord, with Clint Boon contradicting Hingley's suggestion that the band had split up whilst Hingley later claimed that he had been fired by the band at a meeting.

In August 2011, the band announced a reunion with original singer Stephen Holt. Their website indicated that "Inspirals will be recording their first material in 15 years coupled with concerts in South America & Greece." The band recorded "You're So Good For Me"/"Head for the Sun" for Record Store Day, a 7" single that was released, sold and deleted on 21 April 2012. The accompanying video for the main track was shot at a concert in Buenos Aires in November 2011. In support of the single, the band toured the UK in March 2012 for the first time with Holt in 24 years. In May, the band were special guests on a Happy Mondays tour.

In the summer of 2012, the band played at several festivals, culminating with a live performance at the Old Trafford cricket ground on 10 September during England's T20I match with South Africa. For Record Store Day in April 2014, Inspiral Carpets released Dung 4, a previously cassette-only collection of demos from 1987, on vinyl and CD, with the earlier tape Cow Demo added as a free 7" with the vinyl version. Uncut said of the album: "... the whole package is a fine summation of the Inspirals' enduring appeal".

In October 2014, the band released Inspiral Carpets on Cherry Red Records. Their first album in 20 years, Inspiral Carpets contained two past singles, "You're So Good for Me" and "Spitfire", plus 10 new tracks. The album also included "Let You Down", co-written by and featuring punk poet John Cooper Clarke. Interviewed in Record Collector, Boon described the album as "Diverse. A couple (of the songs) have an R.E.M. flavour, one nod to the 50s, two to Joy Division, several the Doors, one Northern soul, two the Beach Boys." After several dates in Europe over the summer, the band played 12 UK dates in December 2014 in support of the album's release.

On 20 November 2016, drummer Craig Gill died at the age of 44. Memorial services were attended by music-industry friends including Inspiral Carpets members, Oasis singer Liam Gallagher, Stone Roses bassist Mani and Happy Mondays singer Rowetta. Soon after his death, Gill's friends began a social-media campaign to make the band's 1994 hit "Saturn 5" the Christmas number-one song for 2016.

=== Reunion (2023–present) ===
In October 2022 the band announced they would be re-forming and performing a live UK tour in March and April 2023. The band also announced that longtime bassist Martyn Walsh was still part of the band but would not be joining them on their forthcoming tour. It was announced that Jake Fletcher would be touring with Inspiral Carpets in 2023 and that Kev Clark from Dub Sex will be on the drums for the tour.

On 15 February 2023, the group also announced their return to Australia for the first time in 30 years that August, as well as their first shows in New Zealand. On 17 March 2023, the band released a singles compilation, featuring all of their hit singles on CD/vinyl from 1988 to 2015 and remixes of the tracks. On 23 March 2023, just as the tour started, it was announced that Boon's son, Oscar, would join the band for some of the tour on bass.

On 28 October 2024 it was confirmed that Martyn Walsh would rejoin the band on bass for the 2025 tour dates and in the studio.

On 20 March 2026, the band's Facebook page announced that guitarist Graham Lambert had decided to take a break from playing live with the band for the near future and that Oscar Boon would step in on guitar for the time being.

== Members ==
=== Current members ===
- Graham Lambert – guitars (1983–1995, 2003–2016, 2022–present)
- Stephen Holt – lead vocals (1983–1988, 2011–2016, 2022–present)
- Clint Boon – keyboards, backing vocals (1987–1995, 2003–2016, 2022–present)
- Martyn Walsh – bass (1988–1995, 2003–2016, 2024–present)

=== Current session and touring musicians ===
- Kev Clark – drums (2022–present)
- Oscar Boon – bass (2023–2024), guitar (2026–present)

=== Past members ===
- Tony Welsh – bass (1983–1986)
- Chris Goodwin – drums (1986)
- Craig Gill – drums (1986–1995, 2003–2016; his death)
- Rick Garage – bass (1986)
- Mark Hughes – bass (1987)
- Scott Carey – bass (1987)
- Dave Swift – bass (1987–1988)
- Tom Hingley – lead vocals (1989–1995, 2003–2011)

=== Former session and touring musicians ===
- Jake Fletcher – bass (2022–2023)

== Discography ==
- Life (1990)
- The Beast Inside (1991)
- Revenge of the Goldfish (1992)
- Devil Hopping (1994)
- Inspiral Carpets (2014)
