= List of compilation albums by The Fall =

British rock group The Fall have released many compilation albums since the band's first releases in 1976.

== Early years 1977–1983 ==
77-Early Years-79 is a compilation of the band's first four singles, all originally issued on Step Forward Records, and was first released as an LP in 1981. One album track ("Dice Man" from Dragnet) is also included, and a CD reissue in 2000 adds two tracks from the various artists compilation Short Circuit: Live at the Electric Ballroom, from the same time. 2002's Early Singles drops "Dice Man" and adds three singles recorded for Kamera Records in 1981 and 1982, with their B-sides. In 2003, tracks from the Step Forward singles and two albums recorded for the label were selected for It's the New Thing! - The Step Forward Years.

In 1985, Situation Two Records (an offshoot of Beggars Banquet Records, to which the band was signed at the time) released Hip Priest and Kamerads, a compilation selected from the 1981–1982 Kamera singles and albums (Hex Enduction Hour and Room to Live), with live tracks recorded at around the same time. The Fall had two stints with Rough Trade Records before and after their time with Kamera - tracks from the Rough Trade releases were compiled on 1987's Palace of Swords Reversed, 1993's The Collection, 2002's The Rough Trade Singles Box, and the same year's two-CD set Totally Wired: The Rough Trade Anthology.

Psykick Dance Hall (2000) collects material from throughout the 1977–1983 period.

== Beggars Banquet 1984–1989 ==
Virtually all the tracks from the many singles released by Beggars Banquet are collected on 458489 A Sides and 458489 B Sides (the latter is a two-CD set or long play cassette). The only exceptions are a few mixes of the single "Hit The North" and the unedited version of "Cruiser's Creek".

== Early 1990s ==
Tracks from the Fall's brief period with a major label (Fontana, a subsidiary of Phonogram Records) are compiled on The War Against Intelligence - The Fontana Years (2003), and Listening In - Lost Single Tracks (2002) - as the name suggests, the latter album collects various singles and their B-sides, with three mixes of Shift-Work album track "So What About It" previously only available on a scarce promo-only single.

The Fall released four albums for Permanent Records between 1993 and 1995, and tracks from all of them are compiled on The Permanent Years - Paranoia Man in Cheap Shit Room (2006).

== Receiver Records ==
In 1996, The Fall signed to Jet Records, and released The Light User Syndrome in June of that year. At around the same time, as a result of what the band's leader Mark E. Smith described as "daft deals I signed when I shouldn't have done", several compilation albums consisting of previously unreleased live and demo material were released by the affiliated Receiver Records. Tracks from these compilations have been recycled in further compilation albums, sometimes including tracks from The Light User Syndrome.

Between January and April 1996, three albums were released on both LP and CD: Sinister Waltz, Fiend with a Violin and Oswald Defence Lawyer. All three had very little information about their sources, but clearly contained out-takes, live tracks, and rough demos, and consisted almost exclusively of previously released songs. In May 1997, tracks from these three albums were selected for The Archive Series, on Rialto Records, and in the same year Receiver packaged the three together as The Other Side of the Fall, and also released a double-CD selection from the original compilations called The Less You Look The More You Find, with tracks from The Light User Syndrome added.

Late 1997 saw two new Receiver compilations, Oxymoron and Cheetham Hill, which again consisted almost exclusively of alternate versions of previously released material. Tracks from these, the previous three compilations, and The Light User Syndrome, were included on a further compilation in 1998, Northern Attitude. Finally, Oxymoron and Cheetham Hill were issued as a triple-CD set in 2003 by Castle Records, with the 1996 live album 15 Ways to Leave Your Man.

== Later compilations ==
Tracks from throughout the 1990s are included on A Past Gone Mad (2000), A World Bewitched (2001), and High Tension Line (2002). A World Bewitched is particularly notable as it is a two-CD set and includes many of Mark E. Smith's guest vocals for other artists including Inspiral Carpets and Edwyn Collins. It was deleted quickly but reissued in 2006 and remains available.

2003's Rebellious Jukebox is an odd mixture of material spread over two CDs, mainly from prior to 1983 but also including some tracks from the first Fontana album Extricate, and a few from 2001's Are You Are Missing Winner, with a DVD containing an interview with Smith. However, in 2006, it was reissued without the DVD. A similarly strange juxtaposition was found in 1998's Smile - It's the Best of the Fall, which mixes Rough Trade tracks from the early eighties and (yet again) some from The Light User Syndrome.

Finally, in 2004, the Fall issued a genuinely career-spanning compilation, 50,000 Fall Fans Can't Be Wrong, which included 39 tracks from throughout the 1978–2003 period across two CDs. Following Mark E. Smith's death in 2018, this was expanded and repackaged as a 3-CD set entitled 58 Golden Greats.

The Fall Box Set 1976–2007, a 91-track collection spanning the group's career to date was released in September 2007. It features a number of rare alternate versions and a disc of live material including many previously unreleased songs.

== Peel sessions ==
In 1999, bassist Steve Hanley selected tracks from the band's many sessions for John Peel's radio show, for the album The Peel Sessions. In 2003 a two-CD set Words of Expectation collected sessions from 1978 to 1981 and a couple from 1996 (the 1996 sessions being mainly songs from The Light User Syndrome). Two years later in 2005, all the band's Peel sessions were finally released by Castle Records in the six-CD box The Complete Peel Sessions 1978–2004.

== List of compilation albums ==
1. 77–Early Years–79 (1981)
2. Hip Priest and Kamerads (1985)
3. Nord-West Gas (1986)
4. Palace of Swords Reversed (1987)
5. 458489 A Sides (1990)
6. 458489 B Sides (1990)
7. The Collection (1993)
8. Backdrop (1994)
9. Sinister Waltz (1996)
10. Fiend with a Violin (1996)
11. Oswald Defence Lawyer (1996)
12. The Archive Series (1997)
13. The Less You Look, the More You Find (1997)
14. Oxymoron (1997)
15. Cheetham Hill (1997)
16. Smile... It's the Best of (1998)
17. Northern Attitude (1998)
18. The Peel Sessions (1999)
19. A Past Gone Mad (2000)
20. Psykick Dancehall (2000)
21. A World Bewitched (2001)
22. Totally Wired – The Rough Trade Anthology (2002)
23. The Rough Trade Singles Box (2002)
24. High Tension Line (2002)
25. Listening In (2002)
26. Early Singles (2002)
27. It's the New Thing! The Step Forward Years (2003)
28. Words of Expectation – BBC Sessions (2003)
29. The War Against Intelligence – The Fontana Years (2003)
30. Rebellious Jukebox (2003)
31. Time Enough At Last (2003)
32. 50,000 Fall Fans Can't Be Wrong – 39 Golden Greats (2004)
33. The Complete Peel Sessions 1978–2004 (2005)
34. The Permanent Years – Paranoia Man in Cheap Sh*t Room (2006)
35. The Fall Box Set 1976–2007 (2007)
36. I've Never Felt Better in My Life 1979–1982 (2008)
37. Rebellious Jukebox Volume 2(2009)
38. Rebellious Jukebox Volume 3(2010)
39. 13 Killers (2013)
40. The Fall 5 Albums (2013)
41. White Lightning (2014)
42. Schtick - Yarbles Revisited (2015)
43. The Classical (2016)
44. The Fontana Years (2017)
45. A-Sides 1978-2016 (2017)
46. Singles 1978-2016 (2017)
47. 58 Golden Greats (2018)
48. Mark's Personal Holiday Tony Tapes (2019)
