= Nobody's Perfect =

Nobody's Perfect may refer to:

== Film and television ==
- Nobody's Perfect (1968 film), a naval comedy film
- Nessuno è perfetto (Nobody's Perfect), a 1981 Italian comedy film starring Renato Pozzetto and Ornella Muti
- Nobody's Perfect (1990 film), a comedy film starring Chad Lowe
- Nobody's Perfect (2004 film), a short film by Hank Azaria
- NoBody's Perfect, a 2008 documentary film about people with phocomelia
- Nobody's Perfect (2008 film), a Hong Kong film of 2008
- Nobody's Perfect (American TV series), a 1980 sitcom
- Nobody's Perfect (British TV series), a 1980–1982 adaptation of the American sitcom Maude
- "Nobody's Perfect" (Degrassi High), an episode of Degrassi High

== Literature ==
- Nobody's Perfect, a 2011 baseball book by Armando Galarraga and Jim Joyce with Daniel Paisner about Galarraga's near-perfect game
- Nobody's Perfect, a 2002 book by Anthony Lane
- Nobody's Perfect, a 2006 children's novel by Marlee Matlin
- Nobody's Perfect, a 1977 novel in the John Dortmunder series by Donald E. Westlake
- Nobody's Perfect, a 1982 novel by Jacqueline Wilson

== Music ==
=== Albums ===
- Nobody's Perfect (Deep Purple album), 1988
- Nobody's Perfect (The Distractions album), 1980

=== Songs ===
- "Nobody's Perfect" (Mike + The Mechanics song), 1988
- "Nobody's Perfect" (Hannah Montana song), 2007
- "Nobody's Perfect" (J. Cole song), 2012
- "Nobody's Perfect" (Jessie J song), 2011
- "Nobody's Perfect", a song by Chris Brown
- "Nobody's Perfect", a song by the Fall of Troy from In the Unlikely Event
- "Nobody's Perfect", a song by Kōji Kikkawa
- "Nobody's Perfect", a song by Madonna from Music

== See also ==
- "Well, nobody's perfect", the well-known last line of the 1959 film Some Like It Hot
- Nobody's Perfekt, a 1981 comedy film
