= Hey! Luciani: The Life and Codex of John Paul I =

1986 play by Mark E. Smith

Hey! Luciani: The Life and Codex of John Paul I is a play written by Mark E. Smith, the lead singer of the band the Fall. Described by its author as "a cross between Shakespeare and The Prisoner", the play centres on the mysterious death of John Paul I, born Albino Luciani, 33 days after his election as pope in 1978.

The script for the play was supposedly written by Smith on beer mats and delivered to the play's director in a shoe box. Starring Smith and the performance artist Leigh Bowery, Hey! Luciani: The Life and Codex of John Paul I ran for two weeks in December 1986 at Riverside Studios, Hammersmith, west London; it was received by critics as a disaster. The Guardian said "The thoroughness of Smith's failure must be accounted his only achievement". Melody Maker, usually supportive of The Fall, did not like the play. Graham Duff has suggested that the poor reception might have been due to the critics expecting a rock musical, which the play is not. In the same month, The Fall released one of the songs from the play, "Hey! Luciani," as a single. Versions of other songs from the play were released as tracks on Fall albums:

- "Dktr. Faustus" (on Bend Sinister, 1986)
- "Living Too Late" (single, featured on some formats of Bend Sinister, 1986)
- "Mark'll Sink Us", "Haf Found Bormann", "Sleep Debt Snatches" (B-sides to "There's a Ghost in My House", 1987, collected on 458489 B-Sides, 1990)

== 2026 restage ==
Graham Duff who had collaborated with Smith, planned to restage the play in Manchester in 2026, with professional actors, and music from local Fall tribute band The Look Back Bores, as part of a 50th anniversary Fall celebration festival, with hopes that it might then be picked up by a bigger art institution. Duff said of the play "Part of what he's doing is showing you that the Vatican is so bound up in bureaucracy, banking, business that the act of worship is actually quite low down. Big events happen, people get murdered, power changes hands. But the world goes on and the little people don’t have any say in it."
