= Hip Priest and Kamerads =

Compilation album by The Fall
- Released: March 1985
- Recorded: 1981–1983
- Genre: Post-punk
- Length: 50:09
- Label: Situation Two
- Producer: Grant Showbiz; Kay Carroll; Mark E. Smith; Richard Mazda

The Fall compilation album chronology
77–Early Years–79 (1981)	Hip Priest and Kamerads (1985)	Nord-West Gas (1986)

Hip Priest and Kamerads is a 1985 compilation album by British rock band The Fall, containing tracks taken from their releases on the Kamera label together with a previously unreleased live track from the same era. It was subsequently reissued with a further four live tracks added.

== Content ==
By 1985, the band's releases on the Kamera label were hard to find and fetching high prices among collectors. Situation Two released this compilation containing all four tracks from the singles released on the label ("Lie-Dream of a Casino Soul"/"Fantastic Life" and "Look, Know"/"I'm into C.B.!"), together with songs from Hex Enduction Hour and Room to Live, one a live version.

The versions of "The Classical", "Fortress", and "Hip Priest" are the album versions from Hex Enduction Hour, and "Room to Live" and "Hard Life in Country" are from Room to Live. "Mere Pseud Mag. Ed." is a live version recorded in St. Gallen in 1983, and at five minutes and 42 seconds is twice as long as the album version on Hex.

The album was originally released in March 1985 on vinyl only.

=== Reissues ===
Hip Priest and Kamerads was first released on CD and cassette in 1988 by Situation Two, with four added live tracks; "Jawbone and the Air-Rifle" was recorded in Newcastle upon Tyne in 1981, "Just Step Sideways" in Brighton in 1982, and "Who Makes The Nazis?" and (the over 15 minutes long version of) "And This Day" at the Hammersmith Palais in 1982. This 14-track running order was maintained on a subsequent CD release in 1995 on Beggars Banquet. The 10-track vinyl version was reissued by Beggars Banquet in Greece in 1985 and by Situation Two in 1990.

== Reception ==
Professional ratings
Review scores
Source	Rating
AllMusic	4/5 stars
Melody Maker	favourable
NME	favourable
The New Rolling Stone Album Guide	3.5/5 stars
SPIN Alternative Record Guide	8/10

Reviews from the time of the album's release in both the Melody Maker and the NME were favourable. Melody Maker's Colin Irwin called it "a pretty satisfying documentary of the period", going on to say "all angles are covered in this profile of Britain's most perverse, jarring and—dammit—entertaining band" and calling the tracks "timeless wonders". Cath Carroll, in her NME review, called the compilation "smartly selected and connected".

Retrospective reviews were also positive. Trouser Press described it as "a good introduction for the uninitiated". Ned Raggett, reviewing the album for AllMusic, gave it four stars, viewing the song selection as "nearly impeccable". It received three and half stars from The New Rolling Stone Album Guide, and an 8/10 rating from the SPIN Alternative Record Guide. The Chicago Tribune, however, described the material on the album as "not among the Fall's most accessible".

== Charts ==
Hip Priest and Kamerads peaked at number 4 in the UK Independent Albums Chart, spending a total of nine weeks on the chart in 1985.

== Track listing ==
Side A
No.	Title	Writer(s)	Length
1.	"Lie-Dream of a Casino Soul"	Craig Scanlon, Marc Riley, Mark E. Smith, Paul Hanley	3:09
2.	"The Classical"	Scanlon, Karl Burns, Riley, Smith, P. Hanley, Stephen Hanley	5:17
3.	"Fortress"	Scanlon, Smith	1:20
4.	"Look, Know"	Burns, Riley, Smith, S. Hanley	4:48
5.	"Hip Priest"	Scanlon, Riley, Smith, S. Hanley	7:35

Side B
No.	Title	Writer(s)	Length
1.	"Room to Live"	Scanlon, Smith	4:14
2.	"Mere Pseud Mag. Ed. (St. Gallen, '83)"	Smith	5:42
3.	"Hard Life in Country"	Arthur Kadmon, Smith	6:03
4.	"I'm into C.B.!"	Smith	6:32
5.	"Fantastic Life"	Scanlon, Riley, Smith, S. Hanley	5:19

The CD and cassette reissues include four extra tracks:

- "Who Makes The Nazis?" (Smith) 6:57
- "Just Step Sideways" (Smith, The Fall) 3:22
- "Jawbone And The Air-Rifle" (Scanlon, Riley, Smith) 4:03
- "And This Day" (Riley, Smith, S. Hanley) 15:20

== Personnel ==
- Mark E. Smith – vocals, electric piano
- Marc Riley – guitar, organ, vocals
- Craig Scanlon – guitar, vocals
- Steve Hanley – bass guitar
- Karl Burns – drums, zither
- Paul Hanley – drums

with:

- Arthur Kadmon (credited on the album as 'Arthur Cadman') – guitar
- Kay Carroll – keyboards
- Adrian Niman – saxophone
- Richard Mazda – saxophone
