= The Distractions =

British punk rock/new wave band

Background information
- Origin: Manchester, England
- Genres: Punk rock, new wave
- Years active: 1975–1981, 2010–present
- Labels: TJM, Factory, Island, That, Rough Trade, Occultation Recordings
- Members: Mike Finney; Alec Sidebottom; Joe Brehony; Chris Dutton; Graham Battersby
- Past members: Steve Perrin; Lawrence Tickle; Tony Trap; Pip Nicholls; Adrian Wright; Arthur Kadmon; Debbie Shure; Bernard van den Berg; Kevin Durkin; Nick Garside; Nick Halliwell; Stuart Mann; Richard Turvey; Jonny Poole
- Website: Official Distractions website

The Distractions are an English punk rock/new wave band from Manchester, England.

== History ==
The band was originally formed in 1975 by college friends Mike Finney (vocals) and Steve Perrin (guitar), alongside Lawrence Tickle (bass) and Tony Trappe (drums).

The band changed tack with the advent of punk in 1977 and Finney and Perrin recruited a new line-up of Pip Nicholls (bass), Adrian Wright (guitar), and Alec Sidebottom (drums, formerly of The Purple Gang), now mixing punk rock with sixties influences.

They shared bills with the likes of Buzzcocks, Magazine and Joy Division, and their debut EP, You're Not Going Out Dressed Like That, released in 1979, led to a deal with Factory Records, who released the follow-up, Time Goes By So Slow. In a 1979 newsletter, Tony Wilson described the band: "Reminds the management of AustinTexas 66, but take your choice".

The band had already signed a deal with Island Records in September 1979, before the Factory single was released, according to Wilson "due to irresistible desire to play the game". Two further singles were issued – It Doesn't Bother Me and Boys Cry before the release of Nobody's Perfect, the group's first album that, ultimately, received significantly more media plaudits than it achieved sales.

Shortly after the album's release Perrin quit the band to be replaced by former Ludus and Manicured Noise guitarist, Arthur Kadmon. The group continued to tour (including playing shows in New York) but eventually disbanded in 1981. Before their end, the band included another latter member, Debbie Shure.

After the band imploded, Finney went on to work with the Secret Seven and the Art of Noise; Kadmon played briefly with The Fall and later went to work in Kiss Kiss Bang Bang, who released a single in 1987; Pip Nicholls went to play drums in Glass Animals, alongside Miaow singer Cath Carroll. while Sidebottom founded and continues to lead the Republic of Swing samba band.

During early 2010, Finney and Perrin revisited material that had been recorded during a brief reunion in the late '90s (when they also played selected shows in Manchester and Liverpool) resulting in their Black Velvet EP which was released via Occultation Recordings.

Perrin and Finney were back in the studio in June 2010 to record new material – this time for a 12" vinyl EP, Come Home featuring "Lost", "Nicole" and "Oil Painting". The session was recorded at Parr Street Studios, Liverpool and engineered by Rich Turvey of The Wild Swans, who also played guitar and keyboards. Stuart Mann played drums on the recording, which was issued by Occultation in November 2010.

The following summer, and following some geographically challenged songwriting, Perrin and Finney alongside Arash Torabi (The June Brides), Mike Kellie (Spooky Tooth / The Only Ones) together with producer Nick Halliwell (The Granite Shore) entered a studio in Exeter. Four days later, they had cut the basic tracks for a new Distractions album; at that time simply entitled '2'. The Distractions' second album, The End Of The Pier was released by Occultation in August 2012. At the same point, the group played their only UK dates of the year – two sell-out shows in Salford.

Five years in preparation, a full scale Distractions retrospective – entitled Parabolically Yours – which covers the group's entire career to date was issued by HiddenMasters in 2017. The first edition – in 12" casebound book format (100+ pages + 4 x CDs) – was limited to 500 copies worldwide.

Since late 2016, the band have been playing again as a live act. The current line up are original members Mike Finney and Alex Sidebottom, plus bass player Joe Brehony and guitarists Chris Dutton and Jonny Poole. Brehony played alongside Alex in 'The Things'. Dutton has been in numerous bands including the 'Blue Orchids' and 'Kill Pretty'. Poole has also been in many Manchester bands including 'The Gift Shop' and 'Gash'. They have played many gigs since reforming including with The Flamin' Groovies at the Ruby Lounge in Manchester. Twice headlining at The Dublin Castle in London and supporting Buzzcocks in December 2019 in Preston.

In June 2020 the above line up of Mike, Alex, Jonny, Joe & Chris released a ltd edition CD/Bandcamp download of two new songs written respectively by Joe and Jonny: 1. Juliet 2. Stacey. So there was no confusion between the original band and the current band they changed the name of the band to 'New Distractions' for the release of this download. They can be found on 'twitter' and this release will be available at newdistractions.bandcamp.com The June 2020 release is purely for charity linked to the recent COVID-19 virus and the homeless.

Shortly after the release Jonny Poole left the band and was replaced by Graham Battersby.

== Discography ==
=== Singles and EPs ===
- You're Not Going Out Dressed Like That EP:
- "Doesn't Bother Me/Nothing" b/w "Maybe It's Love/Too Young" (1979) TJM
- "Time Goes By So Slow" b/w "Pillow Fight" (1979) Factory
- "It Doesn't Bother Me" b/w "One Way Love" (1980) Island
- "Boys Cry" b/w "Paracetamol Paralysis" (1980) Island
- "Something For The Weekend" b/w "What's The Use?" (1980) Island
- "And Then There's..." EP: "24 Hours" b/w "Ghost Of A Chance/Love Is Not For Me" (1981) That (UK indie No. 47)
- Black Velvet EP: "Black Velvet", "Still It Doesn't Ring", "If You Were Mine" (2010) Occultation Recordings
- Come Home EP: "Lost", "Nicole", "Oil Painting" (2010) Occultation Recordings

. "Juliet" / "Stacey" - ltd edition CD and download on bandcamp - all profits to support COVID-19 and homeless related issues in Manchester.

=== Albums ===
- Nobody's Perfect (1980) Island
- The End Of The Pier (2012) Occultation Recordings
- Kindly Leave The Stage (2017) Occultation Recordings
- The Distractions Go Dark (2017; 10" mini album) Occultation Recordings
- Parabolically Yours (2017; book set) HiddenMasters
