= Comic Book Guy =

Fictional character from The Simpsons franchise

- The Simpsons character
- First appearance: "Three Men and a Comic Book" (1991)
- Created by: Jeff Martin; Matt Groening; David X. Cohen
- Designed by: Matt Groening
- Voiced by: Hank Azaria

In-universe information
- Full name: Jeffrey Albertson
- Gender: Male
- Occupation: Proprietor of The Android's Dungeon & Baseball Card Shop
- Spouse: Kumiko Albertson (née Nakamura) (wife)
- Relatives: Postage Stamp Fellow (father); Comic Book Gay (cousin); Graphic Novel Kid (cousin)
- Nationality: American

Jeff Albertson, commonly known as the Comic Book Guy (CBG), is a recurring fictional character in the animated television series The Simpsons and Eisner-nominated spin-off comic book series Comic Book Guy. He is voiced by Hank Azaria and first appeared in the second-season episode "Three Men and a Comic Book", which originally aired on May 9, 1991. Comic Book Guy is the proprietor of a comic book store, The Android's Dungeon & Baseball Card Shop. He is based on "every comic book store guy in America" and represents a stereotypical middle-aged comic-book collector with a supercilious attitude and obsessive knowledge of pop culture minutiae. He is known for his distinctive accent, disagreeable personality, and his catchphrase, "Worst [thing] ever!" (breaking the fourth wall)

== Role in The Simpsons ==
=== Profile ===
Comic Book Guy (who states Jeff Albertson to be his real name in the episode "Homer and Ned's Hail Mary Pass") is a nerdy, snobby and quarrelsome man. He is best known for his eloquence and crabby, sarcastic quips. He is obsessed with collecting comic books and is an avid science fiction buff. He holds a master's degree in folklore and mythology (having translated The Lord of the Rings into Klingon as part of his thesis), as well as a degree in chemical engineering, has an IQ of 170, and is a member of the Springfield branch of Mensa. He is morbidly obese and has long hair, which he always keeps tied in a ponytail.

His catchphrase is the declaration "worst/best [subject] ever", sometimes to the point of breaking the fourth wall. For example, in the episode "Saddlesore Galactica", he wears a T-shirt saying "Worst Episode Ever". Another example of breaking the fourth wall occurs in an episode when Comic Book Guy's chair collapses, and he sarcastically says "Ooh, a fat man falls. Real original." Despite his solitary life, in The Simpsons Movie, minutes before his anticipated death, Comic Book Guy says that his obsessive comic book collecting has been a "life well spent". However, in "Treehouse of Horror VIII", when a nuclear missile homes in on him, he says to himself, "Oh, I've wasted my life", although the Treehouse of Horror episodes are not part of the normal Simpsons canon. In the 2008 episode "Any Given Sundance" it was revealed that he is also a writer and posts to his own site called "Ain't I Fat News", a take on the real-life movie review website Ain't It Cool News.

=== Romance ===
Comic Book Guy was once married in an online role-playing game. He and his Internet wife contemplated having children, but that would have severely drained his "power crystals". In Season 16's "There's Something About Marrying", he hopes to wed a Xena: Warrior Princess cardboard figure. While part of an intellectual junta that briefly ran Springfield in "They Saved Lisa's Brain", he proposes plans to limit breeding to once every seven years (a reference to the Vulcan blood fever of mating, called Pon farr), commenting that this would mean much less breeding for most, but for him, "much, much more". He was a virgin well into his forties, but becomes sexually and romantically involved with Principal Skinner's mother Agnes. He later dates Edna Krabappel after she leaves Skinner at the altar. They are nearly married at a science fiction convention with Skinner and Bart trying to stop the wedding, but Edna changes her mind, preferring not to be tied down to a relationship. Comic Book Guy is not particularly surprised by this, saying, "There are a million valid reasons, but which one did you pick?" When Edna gently explains "It's like I'm DC Comics, and you're Marvel", he accepts the comparison without any rancor. In "Married to the Blob", Comic Book Guy marries Kumiko Nakamura, a Japanese manga artist. As of "The Dad-Feelings Limited", he and Kumiko are trying for a baby.

=== The Android's Dungeon ===
The Android's Dungeon & Baseball Card Shop

Comic Book Guy is the owner of The Android's Dungeon & Baseball Card Shop, a local comic book store. The establishment's inventory of comic books, collectibles, and toys he sells are of wildly varying quality and frequently sold at premium prices. Within the store, which serves as his primary domain, he maintains an authoritative demeanor, often utilizing sarcasm when interacting with younger customers such as Bart Simpson and Milhouse Van Houten. He is also depicted as frequently issuing store bans for minor infractions. The store features a restricted lower level containing a collection of illegal videos (including footage of Mr. Rogers drunk, Alien autopsy, Illegal Alien Autopsy, a "good version" of The Godfather Part III, and Kent Brockman picking his nose).

In "Husbands and Knives", the store was closed due to bankruptcy when a rival comic book shop opened across the road, run by an owner with significantly better customer service and social skills. Although his old store was bought by Marge Simpson in the same episode and not returned, Comic Book Guy continues running his store in future episodes and the rival store is usually not mentioned, though it was referred to again when its owner showed up in "Married to the Blob". Also Bart and Milhouse became managers of The Android's Dungeon for a time in "Worst Episode Ever".

== Character ==
=== Creation ===
Comic Book Guy was partly inspired by a clerk at the Los Angeles comic book shop who often "[sat] on the high stool, kind of lording over the store with that supercilious attitude and eating behind the counter a big Styrofoam container full of fried clams with a lot of tartar sauce." Groening noted:

I can't tell you how many times people have come up to me and said, "I know who you based that comic book guy on. It's that comic-book guy right down the block." And I have to tell them, "No, it's every comic book store guy in America."

Azaria based Comic Book Guy's voice on a college contemporary named Mark who went by the nickname "F", short for "Flounder" from the film National Lampoon's Animal House, and lived in the room next door to him at Tufts University. Hank Azaria further explained that "F" would listen to the song "867-5309" all day long and that Mark would keep a list of top five and bottom five people whom he liked and hated in the dorm and post it hourly. Azaria stated that he himself was always on the bottom five of the list because he complained about the playing of the music. Azaria "loves that the character is an adult who argues with kids as if they're his peers."

=== Development ===
Within the series, the character Comic Book Guy is often used to represent a stereotypical inhabitant of the newsgroup alt.tv.simpsons. The first such instance occurred in the seventh-season episode "Radioactive Man", in which Comic Book Guy is logging on to his favorite newsgroup alt.nerd.obsessive. David X. Cohen often read alt.tv.simpsons to gauge audience response to episodes. He decided to lampoon the passion and the fickleness of the fans.

In the eighth-season episode "The Itchy & Scratchy & Poochie Show" after Comic Book Guy views the Itchy & Scratchy episode featuring Poochie, he immediately goes on the Internet and writes, "Worst episode ever" on a message board; a commentary on how the active audience nitpicks the episode. The writers respond by using the voice of Bart Simpson:

Comic Book Guy: Last night's Itchy & Scratchy was, without a doubt, the worst episode ever. Rest assured I was on the Internet within minutes registering my disgust throughout the world.

Bart: Hey, I know it wasn't great, but what right do you have to complain?

Comic Book Guy: As a loyal viewer, I feel they owe me.

Bart: What? They've given you thousands of hours of entertainment for free. What could they possibly owe you? If anything, you owe them!

Comic Book Guy: ...Worst. Episode. Ever.

The catchphrase further appears on his T-shirt in the eleventh season episode "Saddlesore Galactica", and as the title of the twelfth season episode "Worst Episode Ever". The catchphrase can also be used for describing other things by saying, "Worst. (Noun). Ever."

=== Name ===
A long-running gag on the show was never to reveal the character's name, with other characters referring to him as "Comic Book Guy". The writers had intended to name the character as early as his first episode, but they could not think of a name for him, and they called him "Comic Book Guy", with the intention of naming the character the next time they used him. However, they continually procrastinated. Finally, in the February 6, 2005 episode, "Homer and Ned's Hail Mary Pass", Comic Book Guy nonchalantly tells Ned Flanders: "My name is Jeff Albertson, but everyone calls me 'Comic Book Guy'". Showrunner Al Jean remarked: "That was specifically done to make people really mad. We just tried to pick a generic name. It was also the Super Bowl show. We did it so the most people possible would see it." Groening stated that he had originally intended him to be called Louis Lane and be "obsessed and tormented by" Lois Lane, but Groening was not present when the writers chose the name. His name is also mentioned in The Simpsons Game.

== Reception ==
Hank Azaria has won several Primetime Emmy Awards for Outstanding Voice-Over Performance for his work on The Simpsons, winning one in 2001 for voicing Comic Book Guy and various other characters in the episode "Worst Episode Ever".

== Merchandising and other media ==
Comic Book Guy is featured as a prominent focal character of the Bart Simpsons spin-off comic-book-series Comic Book Guy: The Comic Book: The Death of Comic Book Guy!, nominated for an Eisner Award. Comic Book Guy is featured on the cover of the twelfth season DVD. He appears on other media as well, including T-shirts and drinking glasses.

In The Simpsons Game, he explains all the clichés that the player comes across during the game. Comic Book Guy has appeared in his own five-part comic book, in which his death influenced a nerd and geek gang war. The Simpsons Library of Wisdom includes a volume entitled "Comic Book Guy's Book of Pop Culture". Comic Book Guy appears in Hit and Run as a drivable character, the host for bonus mission level four and host for a level seven mission. He is also a passenger in Road Rage.

Comic Book Guy makes a cameo appearance in the season two finale of The Cleveland Show saying the line, "Worst. Cameo. Ever." Comic Book Guy makes a brief appearance in the Simpsons/Family Guy crossover episode "The Simpsons Guy" to say "Worst. Chicken Fight. Ever." Comic Book Guy makes a brief appearance as the clerk of "Karl's Komics" selling comics to Chip Flagston of Hi and Lois, March 25, 2018.
