= Hank Azaria =

American actor and producer (born 1964)

- Azaria in 2026
- Born: Henry Albert Azaria; April 25, 1964 (age 62); Queens, New York City, U.S.
- Education: Tufts University (BA); American Academy of Dramatic Arts
- Occupations: Actor; producer
- Years active: 1986–present
- Spouses: Helen Hunt (m. 1999; div. 2000); Katie Wright (m. 2007)
- Children: 1

Henry Albert Azaria (/əˈzɛəriə/ ə-ZAIR-ee-ə; born April 25, 1964) is an American actor and producer. He is known for voicing many characters in the animated sitcom The Simpsons since 1989, including Moe Szyslak, Chief Wiggum, Superintendent Chalmers, Comic Book Guy, Snake, Professor Frink, Kirk Van Houten, Duffman, Apu Nahasapeemapetilon, Lou, and Carl Carlson, among others. Azaria joined the show with little voice acting experience, but became a regular in its second season. For his work on the show, he has won four Primetime Emmy Awards.

Alongside his continued voice acting on The Simpsons, Azaria became more widely known through his live-action supporting appearances in films such as Quiz Show (1994), Heat (1995), The Birdcage (1996) (for which he won a Screen Actors Guild Award) and Godzilla (1998). He has also appeared in numerous films including Mystery Men (1999), America's Sweethearts (2001), Shattered Glass (2003), Along Came Polly (2004), Run Fatboy Run (2007), Night at the Museum: Battle of the Smithsonian (2009) and The Smurfs (2011) and The Smurfs 2 (2013). Further voice roles include Anastasia (1997), for which he won an Annie Award.

Azaria's live-action television work includes recurring roles on the sitcoms Mad About You and Friends, as well as dramatic roles in the TV films Tuesdays with Morrie (1999) as writer Mitch Albom and Uprising (2001) as Jewish resistance leader Mordechai Anielewicz. For the former, Azaria received the Primetime Emmy Award for Outstanding Supporting Actor in a Limited Series or Movie. He starred in the title roles in the Showtime drama series Huff (2004–2006) and the IFC sitcom Brockmire (2017–2020). His recurring role on the drama Ray Donovan earned him a sixth Primetime Emmy Award in 2016.

Azaria made his Broadway debut as Lancelot in Spamalot, for which he was nominated for the Tony Award for Best Actor in a Musical. He returned to Broadway in 2007, playing David Sarnoff in The Farnsworth Invention.

== Early life and education ==
Henry Albert Azaria was born in the Queens borough of New York City on April 25, 1964, to Ruth and Albert Azaria. He began going by the name "Hank" as a child, after a pediatrician he visited said he felt it was a more suitable name for a child than "Henry". His paternal grandparents were Sephardic Jews from Salonika and Smyrna. His paternal grandfather, Herman Azaria, came from Salonika which was then in the Ottoman Empire, today the Greek city of Thessaloniki in Greek Macedonia. His paternal grandmother, Sarah (née Corkidi) was born in Bergama, modern-day Turkey (Izmir Province).

His family spoke Ladino, also known as Judaeo-Spanish, which he described as "a strange, antiquated Spanish dialect written in Hebrew characters." Azaria's father ran several dress-manufacturing businesses while his mother raised him and his two older sisters, Stephanie and Elise. Before marrying his father, Azaria's mother had been a publicist for Columbia Pictures, promoting films in Latin American countries as she was fluent in both English and Spanish. During his childhood, Azaria would often "memorize and mimic" the scripts of films, shows, and stand-up comedy routines he enjoyed.

Azaria attended The Kew-Forest School in Queens' Forest Hills neighborhood. He decided to become an actor after performing in a school play at the age of 16, becoming "obsessed with acting" at the expense of his academic studies. Both of his parents loved all forms of show business, which further spurred him to become an actor. He studied drama at Tufts University from 1981 to 1985, where he met and befriended actor Oliver Platt and noted that Platt was a "better actor" than he was and inspired him. Together they starred in various college stage productions, including The Merchant of Venice, before Azaria went to train at the American Academy of Dramatic Arts.

Although he did not expect the endeavor to be successful, he decided to become a professional actor so that he would not regret not having tried later in life. His first acting job was an advertisement for Italian television when he was 17 years old. He also worked as a busboy. He originally intended to work predominantly as a theatrical actor, and he and Platt set up a company called Big Theatre, although Harold Pinter's The Dumb Waiter was the only show they ever performed. Azaria decided that television was a better arena and offered more opportunity, and moved to Los Angeles after being offered work with talent agent Harry Gold.

== Career ==
=== Early career (1986–1988) ===
Azaria got along with talent agent Harry Gold, who was lukewarm about working with him but still sent him out for auditions after a woman Azaria had worked with in New York "got really furious with [Gold]" for breaking his promise to work with Azaria. He made his television debut with a role in the pilot episode of the 1986 ABC comedy-drama series Joe Bash. His part—a one-line role as the police officer Maldonado—was edited out before the show was broadcast, although the role secured him admission to the Screen Actors Guild.

Azaria appeared in the TV film Nitti: The Enforcer, about the gangster Frank Nitti, and appeared in the failed pilot Morning Maggie alongside Matthew Perry, with whom he became good friends. He played Joe in an episode of the sitcom Family Ties in 1988 in which he had one line, and the following year he played Steve Stevenson in an episode of Growing Pains. Azaria has described his career progression as being gradual; he did not achieve overnight recognition or fame. In Los Angeles, Azaria was trained by acting coach Roy London. Between acting jobs he performed as a stand-up comedian, and worked as a bartender for a catering firm.

=== The Simpsons (since 1989) ===
Azaria is known for his voice work in the ongoing animated television series The Simpsons. He joined the show having previously performed only one voice acting job—as the titular animated dog in the failed Fox pilot Hollywood Dog, a show he described as "sort of Roger Rabbit-esque, where the dog was animated, but everybody else was real." The first voice he performed on The Simpsons was that of town bartender Moe Szyslak, replacing Christopher Collins who had initially recorded the character's voice. Having known him from Hollywood Dog, casting director Bonita Pietila called Azaria and asked him to audition for the voice of Moe.

At the time he was performing the role of a drug dealer in a play, utilizing a voice based on Al Pacino's performance in the film Dog Day Afternoon. He used the voice in his audition for The Simpsons and, at the request of the show's executive producers Matt Groening and Sam Simon, made the voice more "gravelly". Groening and Simon thought the resultant voice was ideal for Moe and took Azaria over to the Fox recording studio. Before he had even seen a script, he recorded several lines of dialogue as Moe for the episode "Some Enchanted Evening", dubbing Collins' voice.

Azaria did not expect to hear from the show again, but they continued to call him back, first to perform the voice of Chief Wiggum and then Apu Nahasapeemapetilon. He felt that, initially, "[the producers] didn't seem too pleased with what I had done...[Simon] was very exacting...[and] was kind of impatiently directing me on the ABCs of comedy. But then, much to my surprise, he would still keep having me back every week. But each week, I thought it was going to be my last week because I really didn't think I had done that well." By the show's second season he was performing multiple recurring voices and so was given a contract and made a permanent member of the main cast. Since he joined later than the rest of the cast, Groening still considered Azaria the "new guy".

In addition to Moe, Wiggum and Apu, Azaria provides the voices of Comic Book Guy, Carl Carlson (until season 32, now voiced by Alex Désert), Cletus Spuckler, Professor Frink, Dr. Nick Riviera, Lou, Snake Jailbird, Kirk Van Houten, Bumblebee Man, the Sea Captain, Superintendent Chalmers, Disco Stu, Duffman, the Wiseguy, and numerous guest characters. His co-star in The Simpsons, Nancy Cartwright, wrote that: "The thing about Hank that I most remember is that he started out so unassuming and then, little by little, his abilities were revealed and his contributions to the show escalated. I realized Hank was going to be our breakaway star."

As Moe's voice is based on Al Pacino's, likewise many of Azaria's other recurring characters are based on existing sources. He took Apu's voice from the many Indian and Pakistani convenience store workers in Los Angeles that he had interacted with when he first moved to the area, and also loosely based it on Peter Sellers' character Hrundi V. Bakshi from the film The Party. Originally, it was thought that Apu being Indian was too offensive and stereotyped, but after Azaria's reading of the line "Hello, Mr. Homer", which the show's producers thought was hilarious, the character stayed. Azaria disputed this on LateNet with Ray Ellin, claiming that Apu was always intended to be stereotypical.

Chief Wiggum's voice was originally a parody of David Brinkley, but when Azaria was told it was too slow, he switched it to that of Edward G. Robinson. Officer Lou is based on Sylvester Stallone. Dr. Nick is "a bad Ricky Ricardo impression." The "Wise Guy" voice is "basically Charles Bronson," while Carl is "a silly voice [Azaria] always did." Two of the voices come from his time at college: Snake's is based on Azaria's old college roommate. Comic Book Guy's voice is based on a student who lived in the room next door to Azaria and went by the name "F".

Professor Frink is based on Jerry Lewis' performance in the original The Nutty Professor. The Sea Captain is based on English actor Robert Newton's portrayal of many pirates. Azaria based his performance for the one-time character Frank Grimes, from the episode "Homer's Enemy", on actor William H. Macy. He counts Grimes as the hardest, most emotional performance he has ever had to give in the history of The Simpsons.

Azaria's work on the show has won him four Emmy Awards for Outstanding Voice-Over Performance, in 1998, 2001, 2003 and 2015. He was also nominated for the award in 2009 and 2010, but lost to co-star Dan Castellaneta and guest star Anne Hathaway respectively. He was nominated again in 2012. Azaria, with the rest of the principal cast, reprised all of his voice roles from The Simpsons for the 2007 film The Simpsons Movie. Azaria notes that he spends "an embarrassingly small amount of time working on The Simpsons." He works for "an hour on Thursdays when we read through the script, then four hours on Monday when we record it, and I'll pop in again once or twice." He concludes it is "the best job in the world, as far as I'm concerned."

Up until 1998, Azaria was paid $30,000 per episode. Azaria and the five other main The Simpsons voice actors were then involved in a pay dispute in which Fox threatened to replace them with new actors and went as far as preparing for the casting of new voices. The issue was soon resolved and from 1998 to 2004, they received $125,000 per episode. In 2004, the voice actors intentionally skipped several script read-throughs, demanding they be paid $360,000 per episode. The strike was resolved a month later, with Azaria's pay increasing to something between $250,000 and $360,000 per episode.

In 2008, production for the twentieth season was put on hold due to new contract negotiations with the voice actors, who wanted a "healthy bump" in salary. The dispute was later resolved, and Azaria and the rest of the cast received their requested pay raise, approximately $400,000 per episode. Three years later, with Fox threatening to cancel the series unless production costs were cut, Azaria and the other cast members accepted a 30 percent pay cut, down to just over $300,000 per episode.

In an April 24, 2018, appearance on The Late Show with Stephen Colbert, Azaria discussed his reaction to The Problem with Apu, a 2017 documentary by Hari Kondabolu that examined Azaria and other white actors who had played South Asian roles as stereotypes. During the interview, Azaria described how watching the documentary had changed his perspective on the issue: "The idea that anyone, young or old, past or present, was bullied or teased based on the character of Apu, it just really makes me sad." Azaria also offered to stop voicing the character: "I'm perfectly willing and happy to step aside, or help transition it into something new." In response, Kondabolu tweeted his appreciation for Azaria's statement: "Thank you, @HankAzaria. I appreciate what you said & how you said it." In early 2020, Azaria announced that he was stepping away from the Apu character, primarily because of the stereotypes and bias it perpetuated. Later in the year he retired from voicing Carl for similar reasons. In April 2021, Azaria apologized for voicing the Apu character, on Dax Shepherd's podcast.

=== Further career (since 1991) ===
==== Television work ====
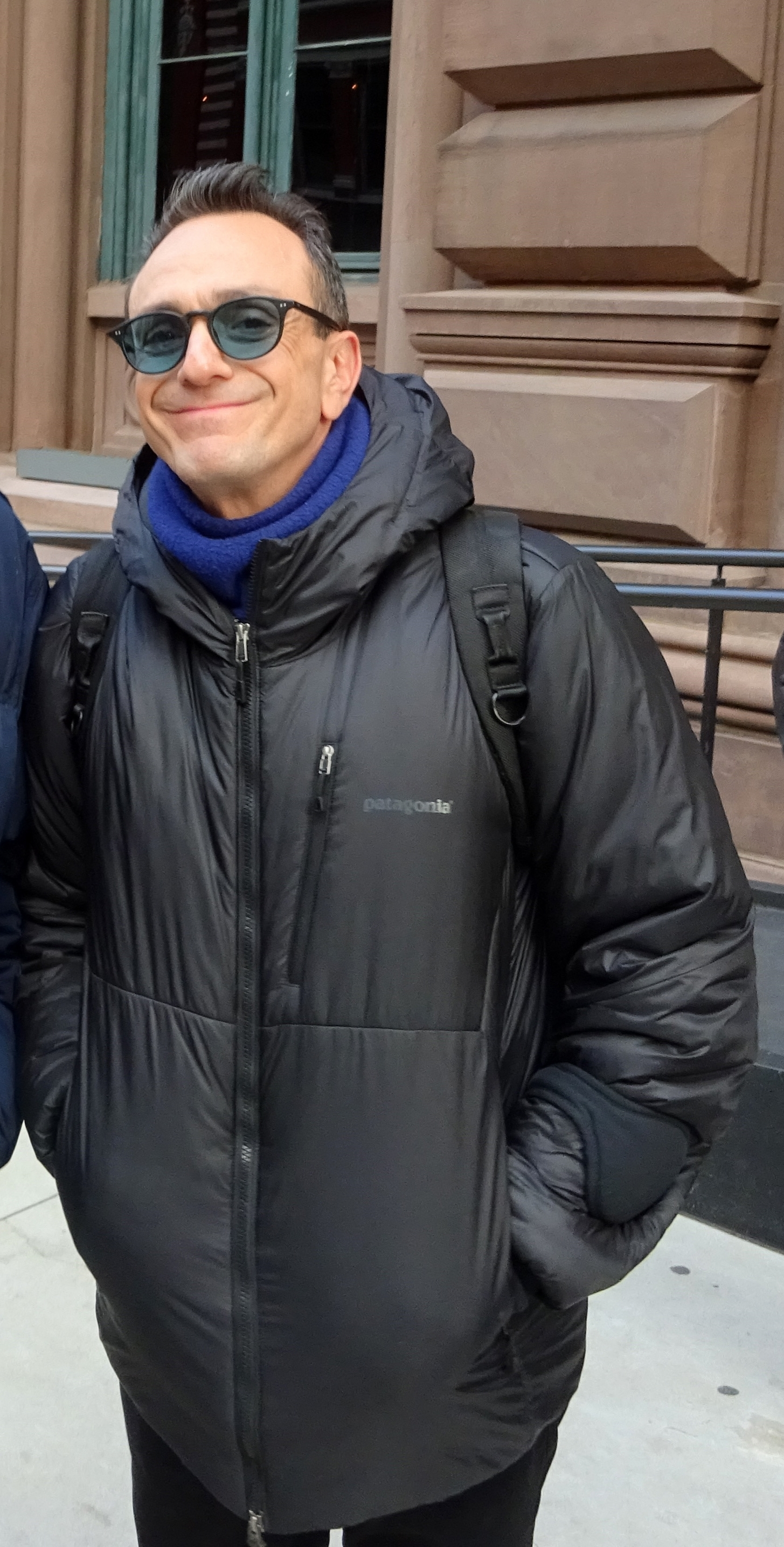
Hank Azaria in 2016

With the continuing success of The Simpsons, Azaria began taking on other, principally live-action roles. He was a main cast member on the show Herman's Head (1991–1994) playing Jay Nichols, alongside The Simpsons co-star Yeardley Smith. He regularly recorded for The Simpsons and filmed Herman's Head during the same day. Following the series' cancellation Azaria unsuccessfully auditioned for the role of Joey Tribbiani, one of the lead characters in the sitcom Friends. He was instead cast in the role of the scientist David, one of Phoebe Buffay (Lisa Kudrow)'s boyfriends in the series. He appeared in the show's tenth episode "The One with the Monkey", before the character left for a research trip in Minsk. He reprised the role in the show's seventh season (2001), before making several appearances in the ninth (2003). This return culminates in David proposing to Phoebe; she rejects him, and David leaves the show for good. From 1995 to 1999, Azaria had a recurring role in the sitcom Mad About You as Nat Ostertag, the dog walker. Azaria was nominated for the Primetime Emmy Award for Outstanding Guest Actor in a Comedy Series for his roles in both Mad About You (in 1998) and Friends (in 2003). Azaria had the lead role in the short-lived sitcom If Not for You in 1995, playing record producer Craig Schaeffer.

Azaria produced and starred in the sitcom Imagine That in 2002, replacing Emeril mid-season in the NBC lineup. He played Josh Miller, a comedy writer, who "transformed" each episode into a character Miller has imagined, "provid[ing] a humorous outlet for his frustrations at home and work". Production closed after five episodes and it was canceled after just two aired, due to poor critical reaction and ratings. Azaria later commented on the show: "I wanted to do something really truthful and interesting and impactful. We had a bunch of executives sitting in the room, all agreeing that The Larry Sanders Show was our favorite thing on television, but we couldn't do it on NBC, and nor would we want to from a business standpoint; it simply wouldn't make enough money. By the time it aired, the writing was sort of on the wall, and I don't blame them at all. It was apparent it wasn't working."

He starred as psychiatrist Craig "Huff" Huffstodt in the Showtime drama series Huff, which ran for two seasons between 2004 and 2006, airing 24 episodes. Azaria served as an executive producer on the show and directed an episode of its second season. After reading the pilot script, he sent it to Platt, who took the role of Huff's friend Russell Tupper. Azaria enjoyed working on the show, but struggled with the bleak subject matter and was often in dispute with its creator Bob Lowry, noting that it "was tough to marry our visions all the time, [because] we both cared so much about it that neither of us were willing to let go." Gillian Flynn of Entertainment Weekly called Azaria "impressively subtle" in the role, while John Leonard of New York magazine said he was a "shrewd bit of casting." The show garnered seven Emmy nominations in 2005, including a nomination for Azaria for Outstanding Lead Actor in a Drama Series. Despite the awards, the show continually received low ratings, and Showtime chose not to commission it for a third season.

Returning to live-action television in 2011, Azaria starred in the NBC sitcom Free Agents, a remake of the British series of the same name. He played Alex Taylor, a recently divorced public relations executive "who is missing his kids and trying to keep himself together", and ends up sleeping with a co-worker Helen Ryan (Kathryn Hahn). Azaria also served as a producer on the show. He was apprehensive about the project, disliking the lengthy schedule required of a lead actor in a single-camera series, and favoring the "sensibility" of cable shows. However, he liked the script and executive producer John Enbom's previous series Party Down and decided to accept the part. Despite Azaria mounting a campaign on Twitter to save it, the series was canceled after four episodes due to low ratings. Between 2014 and 2016, Azaria had a recurring role in the second, third and fourth season of Showtime's Ray Donovan, playing FBI agent Ed Cochran. He won the Emmy for Outstanding Guest Actor in a Drama Series for his work on the show in 2016, as well as earning a further nomination the same category the following year.

Azaria starred in the IFC series Brockmire, which ran for four seasons from 2017–2020. He played the lead role of Jim Brockmire, a legendary baseball announcer, fired for a profanity-filled breakdown live on air after discovering his wife Lucy Brockmire (Katie Finneran) was having an affair. Azaria based the voice and style of Brockmire on several veteran sportscasters, including Bob Murphy and Phil Rizzuto. The character originated as part of the third episode of the Funny or Die web-series Gamechangers, entitled "A Legend in the Booth", which Azaria also co-wrote. He subsequently appeared as Brockmire on the NFL Network's The Rich Eisen Podcast to discuss the National Football League. In November 2012, Azaria sued actor Craig Bierko over the ownership of the Brockmire voice. The case was ruled in Azaria's favor in 2014. Both actors had been using a baseball announcer voice before and since meeting at a party in 1990, but United States district judge Gary Allen Feess ruled that only Azaria's voice was, as Brockmire, a defined, "tangible" character and thus subject to copyright. In 2016, IFC confirmed development on the series, on which Azaria also served as an executive producer. Azaria received three nominations for the Critics' Choice Television Award for Best Actor in a Comedy Series for his performance on the series.

==== Film work ====
"[Azaria's] appeal can best be summed up by, of all things, his hilarious cameo in the goofy comedy Dodgeball. As Patches O'Houlihan, the dodgeball champion who will age into the magnificently gruff Rip Torn, he delivers a pitch-perfect performance in an instructional video in which he chain-smokes, encourages a child to pick on those weaker than him, and steals the film from a cast of comedic greats. It's a wonderful, odd moment that could have failed miserably in the hands of a lesser actor, and he manages to pull it off with only seconds of dialogue. In my humble opinion, and using my limited knowledge of boxing terms: Pound for pound, Hank Azaria is the best actor working today."

— Playwright Jenelle Riley on Azaria.

Azaria made his film debut in the direct-to-video release Cool Blue (1990), as Buzz. His first theatrically released feature film appearance came the same year in Pretty Woman, as a police detective named Albertson. His next major film role was as television producer Albert Freedman in the 1994 film Quiz Show, which was nominated for the Academy Award for Best Picture. In 1996, Azaria played gay Guatemalan housekeeper Agador Spartacus in the film The Birdcage. For the role, which Azaria considers to be his "big break", he was nominated for the Screen Actors Guild Award for Outstanding Performance by a Male Actor in a Supporting Role, and critically branded "the most hilarious performance in the film," by Alison Macor of The Austin Chronicle, while Empire wrote that he "[stole] the show." For the role he used a Guatemalan accent, and made himself sound as effeminate as possible. He had chosen two possible voices, an effeminate one and a tougher one. After advice from a drag queen, he chose the effeminate voice. Three weeks into production, he realized he sounded exactly like his grandmother, which aided his performance. Agador was originally going to be a single scene part, with the larger role of the housekeeper being played by David Alan Grier. With the producers fearing the racial connotations of a black actor in such a part, Azaria inherited the full role.

He appeared in numerous other films in the late 1990s, including Heat (1995), Grosse Pointe Blank (1997), Celebrity (1998) and worked opposite Gwyneth Paltrow, as Walter Plane, in the 1998 adaptation of Great Expectations. He played photographer Victor "Animal" Palotti in Godzilla (1998). Godzilla was one of Azaria's first starring roles in a blockbuster film. Its five-month shoot was the longest of his career to date, but he considered it a good chance to boost his profile. He noted, "I'm so used to melding into every character I play. Even people in the business think the guy who did Birdcage, Quiz Show and Great Expectations are three different actors—which in a way makes me proud, but in another way is very frustrating. It's the curse and blessing of the character actor". The shoot's physical challenges, and the film's critical failure, led Azaria to later describe it as "tough to make, and very disappointing when it came out. It was one you definitely chalk up and say, 'That was part of paying your dues, better luck next time'." In 1999, he starred in the drama Mystery, Alaska as Charles Danner, and the comedy superhero film Mystery Men, as the faux-British silverware throwing expert The Blue Raja. Other film roles included Hector Gorgonzolas in America's Sweethearts (2001), Claude in Along Came Polly (2004), and the young Patches O'Houlihan in DodgeBall: A True Underdog Story (2004), the latter two with Ben Stiller. For his role of Claude, a French scuba instructor, in Along Came Polly, Azaria donned a wig and worked out extensively to get into the physical shape the part required.

Azaria played composer Marc Blitzstein in Tim Robbins' film Cradle Will Rock in 1999. Paul Clinton wrote that Azaria was "brilliant as the tortured (is there any other kind) artist Blitzstein." The same year he appeared as author and journalist Mitch Albom alongside Jack Lemmon in the television film Tuesdays with Morrie, winning the Primetime Emmy Award for Outstanding Supporting Actor in a Miniseries or a Movie for the role. Azaria described the latter as the "best work [he has] done." These were two of the first dramatic roles Azaria had taken; throughout his career, Azaria has primarily worked in comedy, but tries to balance the two. Azaria commented: "all the roles I got were in comedy at first, and I was certainly happy to get those, so I never felt the lack of being considered a dramatic actor because I was so happy to get what I got. And then I became surprised later on when I got dramatic roles. But I never went, 'OK, now it's time to get a dramatic role.'" His next dramatic part was in the television film Uprising in 2001. The film was based on the 1943 Warsaw Ghetto Uprising and Azaria played Mordechaj Anielewicz, one of the revolt's leaders. Azaria was confused by his casting in Uprising and frequently asked the film's producer and director Jon Avnet why he was selected. "I know [Avnet] liked the fact I was Jewish, and he knew I could do accents well. He cast me and David Schwimmer in [Uprising], and we were both sort of mystified. He had some instinct that he wanted people who were more known for being funny. He never explained it satisfactorily to me; I don't understand why." His parts in Tuesdays With Morrie and Uprising affected him, causing a depressive state which he countered with DVDs of the comedy series Monty Python. Azaria found Uprising to be "very difficult very depressing very emotionally challenging" material. In 2003, Azaria played journalist Michael Kelly, the former editor of The New Republic, in the drama film Shattered Glass. Kelly died a few months before the film was released and Azaria said the film "has become a weird kind of eulogy to him."

Since Huff's conclusion in 2006, Azaria has continued to make multiple film appearances. He played the smooth-talking Whit Bloom in David Schwimmer's directorial debut Run Fatboy Run (2007). During production he became good friends with co-star Simon Pegg, performing The Simpsons voices on request, frequently distracting Pegg when he was supposed to be filming. He worked with Stiller again on 2009's Night at the Museum: Battle of the Smithsonian in which Azaria played the villainous pharaoh Kah Mun Rah, utilizing a Boris Karloff accent. Although the film received mixed reviews, critics praised Azaria's performance. Perry Seibert of TV Guide wrote that "thanks to Azaria, a master of comic timing. His grandiose, yet slightly fey bad guy is equally funny when he's chewing out minions as he is when deliberating if Oscar the Grouch and Darth Vader are evil enough to join his team." He appeared as Abraham in Year One (2009), Dr. Stan Knight in 2010's Love & Other Drugs, and played Deep Throat director Gerard Damiano in Lovelace (2013).

Azaria played Gargamel in the animated/live-action adaptation of The Smurfs (2011). Azaria wore a prosthetic nose, ears, buck teeth, eyebrows and a wig, as well as shaving his head. He spent approximately 130 hours in the make-up chair over the course of the production. Azaria considered Gargamel's voice to be the most important part of his performance. The producers wanted an "old, failed, Shakespearean actor" voice, but Azaria felt this would lack energy and wanted something more Eastern European. He eventually selected a voice similar to that of Paul Winchell's from the cartoon. Azaria disliked the cartoon when it first aired, and considered Gargamel too one-dimensional a character and "just this straight villain"; he opted to make Gargamel "more sarcastic" than in the cartoon, but "discovered that there's no way to play Gargamel without screaming your head off at certain points – ramping him up and getting him very upset over Smurfs". He interpreted him as "very lonely", adding that "he hates the Smurfs because they're such a happy family. He wants in really badly. I think he wants to be embraced as a Smurf". Azaria worked with the writers to "infuse" the script with some of his ideas about the character, "particularly with the 'married' relationship between Gargamel and [his cat] Azreal [sic]" which Azaria conceived.

Reviewers from The San Francisco Chronicle and The Boston Globe commented on Azaria's "overacting" in the role of Gargamel. More positive reaction came from Scott Bowles of USA Today called Azaria the "human standout"; Betsy Sharkey of the Los Angeles Times felt he suffered the "greatest disservice" of the film's cast due to a poor script. Azaria noted in an interview with The A.V. Club that The Smurfs and Night at the Museum were films he agreed to do primarily for the money, but that "I won't even do that unless I think it will at least be fun to do...I really try to throw myself into it, figure out the funniest, cleverest way to get the material over, and make it fun to do and fun to watch." Azaria reprised his role in the 2013 sequel The Smurfs 2. In 2016, Azaria starred in Norman with Richard Gere.

==== Further voice work ====
Azaria performed a number of voice roles in addition to The Simpsons, although he noted in 2005: "I started doing other voiceovers for cartoons for a couple of years, but I didn't really love it. I was spoiled by The Simpsons." He voiced Eddie Brock / Venom in Spider-Man: The Animated Series between 1994 and 1996. In the animated feature Anastasia (1997), he voiced Bartok the bat and reprised the role in the direct-to-video prequel Bartok the Magnificent (1999). For his performance in Anastasia, Azaria won the Annie Award for Outstanding Individual Achievement for Voice Acting by a Male Performer in an Animated Feature Production.

He also voiced Eric in the American dub of the series Stressed Eric, Harold Zoid in the 2001 Futurama episode "That's Lobstertainment!", and Abbie Hoffman and Allen Ginsberg in Chicago 10 (2007). For the 2011 film Hop, Azaria voiced Carlos and Phil. The response to the film was mostly negative, but many reviewers praised Azaria's performance. For example, Sandie Chen of The Washington Post said "Azaria has been honing his over-the-top Spanish accent since The Birdcage, so anything he says grabs some laughs", while Emma Simmonds of Time Out called him an "unflappable presence, voicing two characters with style". Later in the year he voiced The Mighty Sven in Happy Feet Two. He also voiced the lead character, Texan border agent Bud Buckwald, in Bordertown, which aired in 2016, as well as Shelfish Sheldon in Mack & Moxy the same year.

Once The Simpsons was "going steadily" and Azaria had enough money to live on, he stopped working on commercials as he found them "demoralizing", feeling that he sounded sarcastic whenever he read for them. When recording the part of "Jell-O Man" for a Jell-O commercial, he was told to make the voice he offered "more likable and friendly so that children like him." After pointing out that "Jell-O Man" was a fictional character, he left and pledged to never record for an advertisement again. However, in 2012 he voiced several insects in a commercial for the Chevrolet Sonic.

==== Other work ====
Azaria wrote and directed the 2004 short film Nobody's Perfect, which won the Film Discovery Jury Award for Best Short at the US Comedy Arts Festival. In January 2007, he was confirmed to be directing Outsourced, a film about two American workers who journey to get their jobs back, after their factory is moved to Mexico. In 2009, Azaria told Empire he was instead focusing on making a documentary about fatherhood. In 2011, he told the Los Angeles Times that this project was "half-complete" and was "forever looking for financing to finish it." It eventually began in 2014, airing on AOL as an online series titled Fatherhood. According to AOL, the series of short episodes documents Azaria's "touching, humorous, and often enlightening journey from a man who is not even sure he wants to have kids, to a father going through the joys, trials and tribulations of being a dad."

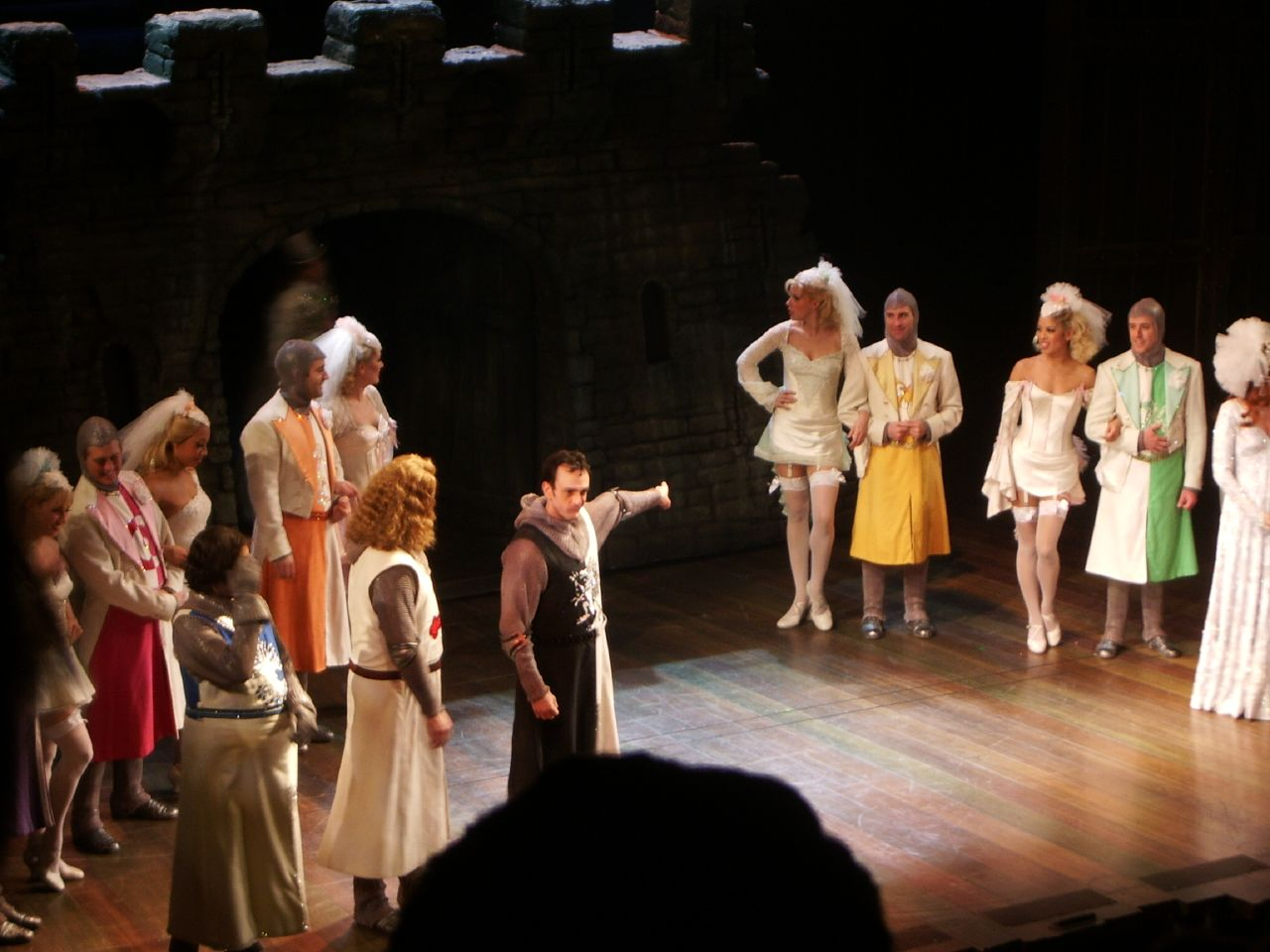
Azaria (center) performing in Spamalot, December 2005

He has periodically returned to theatrical work, appearing in several productions. In 2003, he appeared as Bernard in a run of David Mamet's play Sexual Perversity in Chicago, along with Matthew Perry and Minnie Driver, in London's West End. Azaria made his first appearance as Sir Lancelot, the French Taunter, and four other characters in Spamalot, the musical version of Monty Python and the Holy Grail, which opened in Chicago in December 2004, before moving to the Shubert Theatre on Broadway.

The show met with critical acclaim and received fourteen Tony Award nominations in 2005; Azaria and Tim Curry both received nominations for the Tony Award for Best Performance by a Leading Actor in a Musical. Reuniting with The Birdcage director Mike Nichols, and being a huge Monty Python fan, he saw it as an opportunity he could not pass up, describing it as "so much fun that I haven't realized how tiring it is," and "the most fun that I've ever had in my entire life."

Hank Azaria performs a sellout concert with the EZ Street Band at the Stone Pony in Asbury Park, NJ on October 14, 2026.

He took a break from the show in June 2005 to work on Huff, but returned in December 2005. Alan Tudyk played the role during Azaria's absence. In late 2007 he starred in Aaron Sorkin's The Farnsworth Invention, playing RCA head David Sarnoff. In 2016, he starred in the world premiere of Dry Powder opposite Claire Danes, John Krasinski, and Sanjit De Silva, directed by Thomas Kail, at the off-Broadway Public Theater in New York City.

In August 2024, after his 60th birthday, Azaria began touring with Bruce Springsteen tribute act Hank Azaria and the EZ Band. Azaria and his band have played The Stone Pony in Asbury Park, NJ, sometimes known as "The House That Bruce Built," in 2024 and 2026. His show at The Stone Pony on October 14, 2026 was a sellout and featured a guest appearance by famed music photographer Danny Clinch.

== Acting style and vocal range ==
Azaria's friends refer to him as "the freakish mimic" due to his ability to copy almost anyone's voice, instantly after he has heard it. As a child, he believed that everyone could do this, but later realized that it was not a common talent. Azaria has said, "I can remember every voice I hear, famous or otherwise ... they kind of remain in the memory banks, so I'm ready to trot them out." Azaria was glad to have found the "ultimate outlet" for this skill, in The Simpsons. He "didn't realize it [when he joined the show], but it became like a lab for a character actor. [He] had to do so many voices."

In the early 2000s, Azaria felt he had reached the maximum number of voices he was capable of: "For the first 10 years of The Simpsons, I would develop a bunch of voices. And then ... I hit a point when I was tapped out. Every noise I can make, I have made. Even characters like Gargamel, I've done. Even if it was only two or three lines, at some point I've done something similar on The Simpsons, at least somewhere along the line."

For many of Azaria's characters, much of their humor is derived from a "funny voice", such as The Birdcage and Night at the Museum: Battle of the Smithsonian. He stated that "being funny with a funny voice is more my comfort zone, a broader character that I try to humanize, a kind of silly or wacky persona that I try to fill in," although he finds it "much easier to be someone much closer to myself," as it requires "less energy ... than playing characters that are so out there and high strung."

The Simpsons creator Matt Groening has stated that Azaria possesses the ability to turn unfunny lines into some of the best in an episode, while former writer Jay Kogen stated: "Just when I think I know [Azaria's] bag of tricks, he's always got a new thing he does to surprise me." Throughout the run of The Simpsons, Azaria has had to sing in character several times, a task which he describes as easier than singing normally. The Smurfs writer David N. Weiss says Azaria "has a beautiful treasure trove of talent," and "became what you wished you were writing." Playwright Jenelle Riley wrote in 2005 that Azaria was "by far" her favorite actor, praising his "versatility" and "tendency to take small roles that would normally fade into the background and to consistently create characters people care about," noting his roles in Shattered Glass, Mystery, Alaska and especially DodgeBall: A True Underdog Story.

== Personal life ==
In the early 1990s, Azaria was in a relationship with actress Julie Warner. His relationship with actress Helen Hunt began in 1994; they married in a traditional Jewish ceremony at the couple's home in Southern California on July 17, 1999. The two had appeared together in Mad About You and the Simpsons episode "Dumbbell Indemnity". After a year of marriage, Azaria moved out of the couple's home, and Hunt filed for divorce after a six-month separation, citing irreconcilable differences. The divorce was finalized on December 18, 2000.

Azaria began dating former actress Katie Wright in 2007, and the two married later that year. They have a son named Hal (b. 2009). The family has one dog, Truman, and two rescue cats, Mookie and Wilson. In 2013, the family began renting a home on 80th Street in Manhattan, with plans to make a final decision on where to live in two years. They previously lived in a four-bedroom house in Pacific Palisades, which Azaria bought from his Simpsons co-star Dan Castellaneta in 2011. Several weeks earlier, Azaria had sold his home in Bel Air. Azaria previously owned a fifth-floor co-op loft on Mercer Street in Manhattan's Soho neighborhood, which he bought from photographer Cindy Sherman in 2005, before selling it in 2013.

Azaria is a fan of the New York Mets and the New York Jets.

Azaria suffered from alcoholism for several years. He credited his longtime friend Matthew Perry for encouraging him to attend Alcoholics Anonymous meetings and has been sober since about 2006. His contribution to the substance-free dorm at Tufts University inspired it to be renamed "Simpson House".

Azaria is the godfather of Oliver Platt's son, George. He is also a regular poker player, appearing twice on Celebrity Poker Showdown and competing at other events, finishing a few places short of the bubble in the main event of the 2010 World Series of Poker. Azaria donated to several Democratic Party candidates in the 1990s and 2000s. He enjoys the music of Elvis Costello and Bruce Springsteen, and he has stated that he would have been a therapist if he were not an actor. Azaria co-founded the educational support charity, "Determined to Succeed".

On May 22, 2016, he was awarded the Honorary degree of Doctor of Humane Letters (DHL) from Tufts University.

== Acting credits ==
=== Film ===
| Year | Title | Role | Notes |
|---|---|---|---|
| 1990 | Pretty Woman | Detective Albertson | |
| 1990 | Cool Blue | Buzz | Direct-to-video |
| 1994 | Quiz Show | Albert Freedman | |
| 1995 | Now and Then | Bud Kent | |
| 1995 | Heat | Alan Marciano | |
| 1996 | The Birdcage | Agador Spartacus | |
| 1997 | Grosse Pointe Blank | CIA Agent Steven Lardner | |
| 1997 | Anastasia | Bartok | Voice |
| 1998 | Great Expectations | Walter Plane | |
| 1998 | Homegrown | Carter | |
| 1998 | Godzilla | Victor "Animal" Palotti | |
| 1998 | Celebrity | David | |
| 1999 | Cradle Will Rock | Marc Blitzstein | |
| 1999 | Mystery Men | Jeff / The Blue Raja | |
| 1999 | Bartok the Magnificent | Bartok | Voice, direct-to-video; also producer |
| 1999 | Mystery, Alaska | Charles Danner | |
| 2001 | America's Sweethearts | Hector Gorgonzolas | |
| 2002 | Bark! | Sam | |
| 2003 | Shattered Glass | Michael Kelly | |
| 2004 | Nobody's Perfect | Ray | Short film; Also director; producer and writer |
| 2004 | Along Came Polly | Claude | |
| 2004 | Dodgeball: A True Underdog Story | Young Patches O'Houlihan | |
| 2004 | Eulogy | Daniel Collins | |
| 2005 | The Aristocrats | Himself | Documentary |
| 2007 | The Grand | Mike "The Bike" Heslov | |
| 2007 | The Simpsons Movie | Various Characters | Voice |
| 2007 | Run Fatboy Run | Whit Bloom | |
| 2007 | Chicago 10 | Abbie Hoffman / Allen Ginsberg | Voice |
| 2008 | Immigrants | Jóska | Voice |
| 2009 | Night at the Museum: Battle of the Smithsonian | Kahmunrah, The Thinker, Abraham Lincoln | Voice |
| 2009 | Year One | Abraham | |
| 2010 | Love & Other Drugs | Dr. Stan Knight | |
| 2010 | Under the Boardwalk: The Monopoly Story | Himself | Documentary |
| 2011 | Hop | Carlos, Phil | Voice |
| 2011 | The Smurfs | Gargamel | |
| 2011 | Happy Feet Two | The Mighty Sven | Voice |
| 2011 | The Smurfs: A Christmas Carol | Gargamel | Voice; short film |
| 2013 | Lovelace | Gerard Damiano | |
| 2013 | The Smurfs 2 | Gargamel | |
| 2013 | I Know That Voice | Himself | Documentary |
| 2016 | Norman: The Moderate Rise and Tragic Fall of a New York Fixer | Srul Katz | |
| 2018 | Ask Me If I Care | Lou Kline | Short film |
| 2021 | Plusaversary | Various roles (Note: Azaria voiced several roles including Moe Szyslak, Sea Captain, Goofy, and Buzz Lightyear.) | Voice; Short film |
| 2022 | Out of the Blue | Jock | |
| 2023 | Rogue Not Quite One | Chief Wiggum | Voice; short film |
| 2025 | The Electric State | Perplexo | Voice |
| 2026 | Behemoth! | Peter Serian | Post-production |

=== Television ===
| Year | Title | Role | Notes |
|---|---|---|---|
| 1986 | Joe Bash | Maldonado | Episode: "Pilot"; deleted scene |
| 1987 | Morning Maggie | Philly McAllister | Television film |
| 1988 | Family Ties | Joe | Episode: "Designing Woman" |
| 1988 | Frank Nitti: The Enforcer | Luc | Television film |
| 1989 | Growing Pains | Steve Stevenson | Episode: "The New Deal: Part 2" |
| 1989–present | The Simpsons | Various roles (Note: Azaria is known for voicing various roles including Moe Szyslak, Chief Clancy Wiggum, Apu Nahasapeemapetilon (1990–2017), Lou (1990–2020), and others.) | Voice, main role (769 episodes) |
| 1990 | Hollywood Dog | Hollywood Dog | Voice, pilot |
| 1990 | The Fresh Prince of Bel-Air | Jerry | Episode: "Mistaken Identity" |
| 1990 | Babes | Tony | Episode: "Rent Strike" |
| 1991–1994 | Herman's Head | Jay Nichols | Main role (72 episodes) |
| 1994 | Beethoven | Killer, Ned, Traffic Cop, Harv, Ex-Con, Firemen | Voice, 4 episodes |
| 1994–1996 | Spider-Man: The Animated Series | Eddie Brock / Venom, additional voices | Voice, 8 episodes |
| 1994; 2001–2003 | Friends | David | 5 episodes |
| 1995 | Tales from the Crypt | Richard | Episode: "Doctor of Horror" |
| 1995 | What a Cartoon! | Elmo | Voice, episode: "The Fat Cats in 'Drip Dry Drips'" |
| 1995 | If Not for You | Craig Schaeffer | 8 episodes |
| 1995–1999 | Mad About You | Nat Ostertag | 16 episodes |
| 1998 | Stressed Eric | Eric Feeble | Voice, American English dub |
| 1999 | Tuesdays with Morrie | Mitch Albom | Television film |
| 2000 | Fail Safe | Prof. Groeteschele | Television film |
| 2001 | Futurama | Harold Zoid | Voice, episode: "That's Lobstertainment!" |
| 2001 | Uprising | Mordechai Anielewicz | Television film |
| 2002 | Imagine That | John Miller | Main role (5 episodes); also executive producer |
| 2004–2006 | Huff | Dr. Craig "Huff" Huffstodt | Main role (26 episodes); also executive producer |
| 2011 | The Cleveland Show | Comic Book Guy | Voice, episode: "Hot Cocoa Bang Bang" |
| 2011 | Free Agents | Alex Taylor | 8 episodes |
| 2012 | Stand Up to Cancer | Moe Szyslak, Apu Nahasapeemapetilon, Rafael | Voice, television special |
| 2013 | Sesame Street | Himself | Episode: "Count Tribute" |
| 2013 | The Smurfs: The Legend of Smurfy Hollow | Gargamel | Voice, television short |
| 2013 | Timms Valle | Chaz Babcock | Voice, pilot |
| 2013–2019 | Family Guy | Additional Voices | 4 episodes |
| 2014–2016 | Ray Donovan | Ed Cochran | 14 episodes |
| 2016 | Bordertown | Bud Buckwald | Voice, main role (13 episodes) |
| 2016 | Mack & Moxy | Shelfish Sheldon | Voice, main role (12 episodes) |
| 2017–2020 | Brockmire | Jim Brockmire | Main role (32 episodes); also executive producer |
| 2017 | The Wizard of Lies | Frank DiPascali | Television film |
| 2018 | Maniac | Hank Landsberg | 3 episodes |
| 2022 | Life & Beth | Funeral Director | Episode: "We're Grieving" |
| 2022 | Super Pumped | Tim Cook | Episode: "The Charm Offensive" |
| 2023 | Hello Tomorrow! | Eddie Nichols | Main role (10 episodes) |
| 2023 | The Marvelous Mrs. Maisel | Danny Stevens | Episode: "A House Full of Extremely Lame Horses" |
| 2023 | The Idol | Chaim | Main role (5 episodes) |
| 2025 | The Artist | Thomas Edison | Main role (6 episodes) |

=== Theatre ===
| Year | Title | Role | Venue | Ref. |
|---|---|---|---|---|
| 2003 | Sexual Perversity in Chicago | Bernard | Comedy Theatre, West End | |
| 2004–2005 | Spamalot | Sir Lancelot / French Taunter; Tim the Enchanter / Knight Who Says "Ni!" | Shubert Theatre, Chicago | |
| 2005–2006 | Spamalot | Sir Lancelot / French Taunter; Tim the Enchanter / Knight Who Says "Ni!" | Shubert Theatre, Broadway | |
| 2007 | The Farnsworth Invention | David Sarnoff | Music Box Theatre, Broadway | |
| 2016 | Dry Powder | Rick | The Public Theater, Off-Broadway | |
| 2023 | Gutenberg! The Musical! | The Producer | James Earl Jones Theatre, Broadway | |
| 2025 | All In: Comedy About Love | Performer | Hudson Theatre, Broadway | |

=== Video games ===
| Year | Title | Role |
|---|---|---|
| 1996 | The Simpsons: Cartoon Studio | Apu Nahasapeemapetilon, Chief Clancy Wiggum, Bumblebee Man, Dr. Nick Riveria |
| 1997 | Anastasia: Adventures with Pooka and Bartok | Bartok |
| 1997 | The Simpsons: Virtual Springfield | Apu Nahasapeemapetilon, Moe Szyslak, Bumblebee Man, Dr. Nick Riveria, Cletus Spuckler, Professor John Frink, Chief Clancy Wiggum, Various characters |
| 2001 | The Simpsons Wrestling | Apu Nahasapeemapetilon, Moe Szyslak, Bumblebee Man, Dr. Nick Riveria, Cletus Spuckler, Professor John Frink, Chief Clancy Wiggum, Various characters |
| 2001 | The Simpsons: Road Rage | Apu Nahasapeemapetilon, Moe Szyslak, Bumblebee Man, Dr. Nick Riveria, Cletus Spuckler, Professor John Frink, Chief Clancy Wiggum, Various characters |
| 2002 | The Simpsons Skateboarding | Apu Nahasapeemapetilon, Moe Szyslak, Bumblebee Man, Dr. Nick Riveria, Cletus Spuckler, Professor John Frink, Chief Clancy Wiggum, Various characters |
| 2003 | The Simpsons: Hit & Run | Apu Nahasapeemapetilon, Moe Szyslak, Bumblebee Man, Dr. Nick Riveria, Cletus Spuckler, Professor John Frink, Chief Clancy Wiggum, Various characters |
| 2005 | Friends: The One with All the Trivia | David |
| 2007 | The Simpsons Game | Apu Nahasapeemapetilon, Moe Szyslak, Dr. Nick Riveria, Cletus Spuckler; Professor John Frink, Chief Clancy Wiggum, Various characters |
| 2008 | Grand Theft Auto IV | Various |
| 2009 | Night at the Museum: Battle of the Smithsonian | Kahmunrah, The Thinker |
| 2012 | The Simpsons: Tapped Out | Apu Nahasapeemapetilon, Moe Szyslak, Dr. Nick Riveria, Cletus Spuckler; Professor John Frink, Chief Clancy Wiggum, Various characters |
| 2025 | Fortnite Battle Royale | Moe Szyslak, Chief Wiggum, Professor Frink |

=== Theme parks ===
| Year | Title | Role | Note |
|---|---|---|---|
| 2008 | The Simpsons Ride | Moe Szyslak, Chief Wiggum, Professor Frink, Snake Jailbird, Apu Nahasapeemapetilon | |

== Awards and nominations ==
| Organizations | Year | Category | Nominated work | Result | Ref. |
|---|---|---|---|---|---|
| Actor Awards | 1996 | Outstanding Actor in a Supporting Role | The Birdcage | Nominated | |
| Actor Awards | 1996 | Outstanding Cast in a Motion Picture | The Birdcage | Won | |
| Actor Awards | 1999 | Outstanding Actor in a Miniseries or Television Movie | Tuesdays with Morrie | Nominated | |
| Actor Awards | 2004 | Outstanding Actor in a Drama Series | Huff | Nominated | |
| American Comedy Awards | 1999 | Funniest Male Guest Appearance in a TV Series | Mad About You | Nominated | |
| American Comedy Awards | 2000 | Funniest Male Guest Appearance in a TV Series | Mad About You | Nominated | |
| Annie Awards | 1998 | Outstanding Voice Acting in a Feature Production | Anastasia | Won | |
| Critics' Choice Television Awards | 2001 | Best Actor in a Picture Made for Television | Uprising | Nominated | |
| Critics' Choice Television Awards | 2018 | Best Actor in a Comedy Series | Brockmire | Nominated | |
| Critics' Choice Television Awards | 2019 | Best Actor in a Comedy Series | Brockmire | Nominated | |
| Critics' Choice Television Awards | 2021 | Best Actor in a Comedy Series | Brockmire | Nominated | |
| Primetime Emmy Awards | 1998 | Outstanding Voice-Over Performance | The Simpsons | Won | |
| Primetime Emmy Awards | 1998 | Outstanding Guest Actor in a Comedy Series | Mad About You | Nominated | |
| Primetime Emmy Awards | 2000 | Outstanding Supporting Actor in a Miniseries or a Movie | Tuesdays with Morrie | Won | |
| Primetime Emmy Awards | 2001 | Outstanding Voice-Over Performance | The Simpsons (episode: "Worst Episode Ever") | Won | |
| Primetime Emmy Awards | 2003 | Outstanding Voice-Over Performance | The Simpsons (episode: "Moe Baby Blues") | Won | |
| Primetime Emmy Awards | 2003 | Outstanding Guest Actor in a Comedy Series | Friends | Nominated | |
| Primetime Emmy Awards | 2005 | Outstanding Lead Actor in a Drama Series | Huff | Nominated | |
| Primetime Emmy Awards | 2009 | Outstanding Voice-Over Performance | The Simpsons (episode: "Eeny Teeny Maya Moe") | Nominated | |
| Primetime Emmy Awards | 2010 | Outstanding Voice-Over Performance | The Simpsons (episode: "Moe Letter Blues") | Nominated | |
| Primetime Emmy Awards | 2012 | Outstanding Voice-Over Performance | The Simpsons (episode: "Moe Goes from Rags to Riches") | Nominated | |
| Primetime Emmy Awards | 2015 | Outstanding Character Voice-Over Performance | The Simpsons (episode: "The Princess Guide") | Won | |
| Primetime Emmy Awards | 2016 | Outstanding Guest Actor in a Drama Series | Ray Donovan (episode: "One Night in Yerevan") | Won | |
| Primetime Emmy Awards | 2017 | Outstanding Guest Actor in a Drama Series | Ray Donovan (episode: "Norman Saves the World") | Nominated | |
| Primetime Emmy Awards | 2019 | Outstanding Character Voice-Over Performance | The Simpsons (episode: "From Russia Without Love") | Nominated | |
| Primetime Emmy Awards | 2020 | Outstanding Character Voice-Over Performance | The Simpsons (episode: "Frinkcoin") | Nominated | |
| Primetime Emmy Awards | 2024 | Outstanding Character Voice-Over Performance | The Simpsons (episode: "Cremains of the Day") | Nominated | |
| Primetime Emmy Awards | 2025 | Outstanding Character Voice-Over Performance | The Simpsons (episode: "Abe League of Their Moe") | Nominated | |
| Primetime Emmy Awards | 2026 | Outstanding Character Voice-Over Performance | The Simpsons (episode: "Keep Chalm and Gary On") | Nominated | |
| Tony Awards | 2005 | Best Leading Actor in a Musical | Monty Python's Spamalot | Nominated | |
| Teen Choice Awards | 2009 | Choice Movie Villain | Night at the Museum: Battle of the Smithsonian | Nominated | |
