= Fall in a Hole =

Live album by The Fall
- Released: December 1983
- Recorded: Mainstreet Cabaret, Auckland, 21 August 1982
- Genre: Post-punk
- Length: 88:15
- Label: Flying Nun Records
- Producer: Chris Knox

The Fall chronology
Room to Live (1982)	Fall in a Hole (1983)	Perverted by Language (1983)

Fall in a Hole is a live album by the Fall, recorded in Auckland in August 1982 and released in December 1983 on the Flying Nun label of New Zealand.

== Recording and release ==
The album was recorded at the last show of the group's 1982 tour of Australia and New Zealand, at Mainstreet Cabaret in Auckland on 21 August 1982, after Chris Knox got the band's agreement to record it, and the first disc of the album is taken from Knox's four-track tape recording through the mixing desk. Knox ran out of tape, so the later songs were taken from cassette recordings by others. There is a detectable difference in the sound quality between the two discs due to the differing sources.

Consisting of one 33 rpm record and one 45 rpm record, Fall in a Hole captures the group fresh from the relative commercial success of Hex Enduction Hour and debuting songs from its followup, Room to Live.

The sleeve (designed by Knox) features a clipping from the front page of Christchurch Press showing a photo of Marc Riley with a caption of "Happy Fall guitarist", although Riley had left the band by the time of the album's release.

The album was originally only released in New Zealand in December 1983. However, a small number were exported to the UK early in 1984 and, in the sleeve notes for the 2002 UK CD edition, Chris Knox, who had recorded the show, stated that Mark E. Smith had been very unhappy at copies appearing in the UK and that exports ceased at his request. The album immediately became a highly valued collector's item. Smith demanded all of the profits from the album, putting Flying Nun in a precarious financial position and delaying several of the label's other releases.

=== Reissues ===
Often referred to as simply In a Hole, the album has been reissued on CD three times, the first attempt (Cog Sinister 1997) being mastered from a scratched bootleg copy, complete with uncorrected vinyl skips. A 2002 reissue (titled Fall in a Hole + and issued through Voiceprint) was remastered from a superior vinyl copy and also added additional tracks from other dates on the tour. The most recent incarnation (Castle Music, 2006) duplicated the musical content of the 2002 edition exactly but restored the original title, omitting the "+".

== Critical reception ==
Professional ratings
Review scores
Source	Rating
AllMusic	3.5/5 stars

AllMusic's Ted Mills gave it three and a half stars, saying "the band is mostly tight, though the drumming gets a bit ropey in places, but perfection was never the Fall's reason for being". The New Rolling Stone Album Guide describes it as an "excellent live album". In the view of writers for Trouser Press, "recording quality, execution and song selection are superb".

== Track listing ==
=== Disc One ===
1. "Impression of J. Temperance" (Smith, Riley, Scanlon) – 4:34
2. "The Man Whose Head Expanded" (Smith, Hanley, Scanlon) – 4:50
3. "Room To Live" (Smith, Scanlon) – 4:11
4. "Hip Priest" (Riley, Hanley, Scanlon, Hanley, Smith) – 7:15
5. "Lie Dream of a Casino Soul" (Smith, Riley) – 4:13
6. "Prole Art Threat" (Riley, Smith) – 3:39
7. "Hard Life in Country" (Smith, Cadman – as listed, actually Arthur Kadmon) – 7:29
8. "The Classical (minus intro.)" (Smith, The Fall) – 5:02
9. "Mere Pseud Mag Ed" (Smith, Riley) – 3:25
10. "Marquis Cha-Cha" (Smith, Burns) – 5:50
11. "Backdrop" (Smith, Scanlon, Riley, Hanley) – 10:19

=== Disc Two ===
1. "Fantastic Life" (Smith, Riley, Scanlon, Hanley, Hanley) – 7:56
2. "English Scheme" (Riley, Scanlon, Smith) – 2:20
3. "Joker Hysterical Face" (Smith, Riley, Hanley) – 4:18
4. "No Xmas for John Quays" (Smith) – 6:43
5. "Solicitor in Studio" (Smith, Burns, Scanlon) – 6:02

=== Additional tracks on 2002/2006 CD editions ===
1. "The Container Drivers" (Smith, Riley, Scanlon, Hanley) – 3:32
2. "C'n'C"/"Black Night" (Smith, Riley, Scanlon, Hanley/Blackmore, Gillan, Glover, Lord, Paice) – this is a version of "Cash 'n' Carry" that segues into a cover of the Deep Purple song. – 5:28
3. "Look, Know" (Smith, Riley, Burns, Hanley, Carroll) – 5:12
4. "Who Makes The Nazis?" (Smith) – 8:36
5. "Gramme Friday" (Smith, Riley, Scanlon) – 3:46
6. "Slates, Slags, etc" (Riley, Hanley, Smith, Scanlon, Hanley) – 8:06

All writing credits are as per the 2006 edition.

== Personnel ==
- Mark E. Smith – vocals, kazoo, keyboards, guitar
- Marc Riley – guitar, keyboards, backing vocals
- Craig Scanlon – guitar, backing vocals
- Steve Hanley – bass guitar
- Karl Burns – drums, bass guitar, guitar
- Paul Hanley – drums
