= Comic Book Guy: The Comic Book =

Comic book limited series

Publication information
- Publisher: Bongo Comics
- Format: Limited series
- Publication date: July – November 2010
- No. of issues: 5
- Main character(s): Comic Book Guy (Jeff Albertson); Lisa Simpson; Graphic Novel Kid

Creative team
- Written by: Ian Boothby
- Artist(s): Nathan Hamill; Jason Ho; John Delaney; Bill Morrison; Karen Bates
- Editor(s): Bill Morrison

The Death of Comic Book Guy!, published as Comic Book Guy: The Comic Book, is an American comic book limited series written by Ian Boothby and drawn by various artists. Published by Bongo Comics as a spin-off of Bart Simpson, released across sixteen chapters (and five issues), the series chronicles the apparent death of Comic Book Guy, and how the residents of the city of Springfield react to it. The series received a generally positive critical reception, and was nominated for the 2011 Eisner Award for Best Humor Publication.

== Premise ==
In the storyline, after Comic Book Guy is publicly killed (apparently accidentally), Lisa Simpson investigates the circumstances behind it as the residents of the city of Springfield mourn him.

== Reception ==
Receiving a generally positive critical reception, the series was nominated for the 2011 Eisner Award for Best Humor Publication.
