= Fall Heads Roll =

Studio album by The Fall
- Released: 3 October 2005
- Recorded: January 2005, mid 2005
- Studios: Gigantic Studios, New York, US; Gracieland Studios, Rochdale, UK
- Genre: Alternative rock
- Length: 55:54
- Labels: Slogan (UK); Narnack Records (US)
- Producers: Mark E. Smith; Simon Archer; Tim Baxter

The Fall chronology
The Complete Peel Sessions 1978–2004 (2005)	Fall Heads Roll (2005)	Reformation Post TLC (2007)

Singles from Fall Heads Roll
- 1. "I Can Hear the Grass Grow" Released: 26 September 2005

Fall Heads Roll is the 24th studio album by English post-punk group the Fall, released in 2005. Although well-received by critics, it didn't reach the top 100 of the UK Albums Chart, and was the last album released by the band prior to major personnel changes.

== Background, recording, and release ==
The album was recorded at Lisa Stansfield's Gracieland Studios in Rochdale, UK and at Gigantic Studios in New York City.

In a March 2005 interview with Kitchen Sink magazine prior to the album's release, singer Mark E. Smith mentioned Heads Are Rolling and If You Assume as two possible titles.

The album includes a cover version of the Move's "I Can Hear the Grass Grow", and "What About Us?", a song written from the point of view of an East German immigrant who berates Harold Shipman for giving morphine to old ladies instead of him. "Breaking the Rules" evolved from the band's attempts to record "Walk Like a Man", with lyrics from a song by Bec Walker, an aspiring singer who had been on work experience at Gracieland Studios at the time the album was recorded. The album's closing track, "Trust in Me", features guest lead vocals from Kenny Cummings of the band Shelby, who had first met Smith and Elena Poulou at the Gigantic offices earlier on the day it was recorded, with additional vocal contributions from Phil Schuster of Shelby, and recording engineers Billy Pavone and Simon "Ding" Archer.

Although the Sanctuary group had reissued several earlier Fall albums and their Peel Sessions box set (on their Castle Communications imprint), this was the first album of new Fall material to be released by them, on this occasion appearing on their Slogan label. The UK version was released on CD and a limited vinyl pressing of 1,000, and was preceded by a single release of "I Can Hear the Grass Grow". In the US, the album was their second release with Narnack Records. The US double LP edition of the album contains a different version of the track "Blindness".

"Blindness" was used in a 2007 US television ad campaign for the Mitsubishi Outlander.

It was the last album with this lineup of the band to be released; A later album was largely completed but left unreleased when Smith parted company with most of the band members.

== Critical reception ==
Professional ratings
Aggregate scores
Source	Rating
Metacritic	80/100
Review scores
Source	Rating
AllMusic	3.5/5 stars
Blender	4/5 stars
The Guardian	5/5 stars
New Zealand Herald	3/5 stars
NME	8/10
Pitchfork	7.8/10
PopMatters	8/10
Spin	B
Tiny Mix Tapes	4/5 stars
Uncut	7/10

The album received generally positive reviews, with a score of 80 at Metacritic. Alexis Petridis, reviewing the album for The Guardian, gave it a 5-star review, describing it as "of head-turning quality" and stating the "Youwanner" riff "could strip paint". Joe Tangari, for Pitchfork, gave it 7.8 out of 10, calling it "a grab-bag of a Fall album with brilliant highs and scattered lows". PopMatters' Josh Berquist gave it an 8/10 rating, stating "Fall Heads Roll resounds with the same kind of incongruous charm that ingratiated newcomers with The Wonderful and Frightening World of The Fall or The Unutterable". Scott Kara, for the New Zealand Herald, gave it three stars, viewing it as the Fall "back to their raw, punchy and rocky best". Tiny Mix Tapes gave it 4 out of 5, describing "Blindness" as "an absolute classic". Pascal Bertin, reviewing the album for Les Inrockuptibles, stated that band had "recycled its own musical formula but manages once again to regenerate it". AllMusic's David Jeffries gave it 3.5 stars, describing it as "a rocking album that relies heavily on its highlights", which he considered to be "Pacifying Joint", "What About Us", "Blindness", and their cover of "I Can Hear the Grass Grow". BBC reviewer Nick Reynolds viewed Smith's performances on the album as erratic, stating "Sometimes he's as sharp as a needle, sometimes he's incomprehensible.", but viewed "Youwanner" and "Clasp Hands" as classic Fall tracks. Chris Brown, for the Daily Post viewed it as not one of the band's best albums.

== Track listing ==
No.	Title	Writer(s)	Length
1.	"Ride Away"	Mark E. Smith, Elena Poulou	5:01
2.	"Pacifying Joint"	Smith	3:46
3.	"What About Us?"	Smith, Poulou	5:51
4.	"Midnight in Aspen"	Smith, Steve Trafford	3:13
5.	"Assume"	Smith	4:07
6.	"Aspen Reprise"	Smith, Trafford	1:52
7.	"Blindness"	Smith, Spencer Birtwistle	(Note: 7:11 on US double-LP.) 7:23
8.	"I Can Hear the Grass Grow"	Roy Wood	2:49
9.	"Bo Demmick"	Smith	4:15
10.	"Youwanner"	Smith, Simon Archer, Pritchard	5:02
11.	"Clasp Hands"	Smith, Trafford	2:45
12.	"Early Days of Channel Führer"	Smith, Pritchard	3:48
13.	"Breaking the Rules"	Bec Walker (Note: "Walk Like a Man", from which "Breaking the Rules" evolved, is credited to Bob Crewe and Bob Gaudio.)	2:26
14.	"Trust in Me"	Smith, Trafford	3:34
Total length:			55:54

On the back cover of the CD, tracks were printed in the wrong order, and it included an additional insert labelled "The Real New Fall Tracklist" (as a reference to the group's previous album, The Real New Fall LP), featuring the correct track order.

On the version of the vinyl released in the UK and Europe, "Bo Demmick" is moved from track 9 to track 7, meaning it closes side A, with "Blindness" opening side B.

== Personnel ==
The Fall

- Mark E. Smith – vocals, production
- Ben Pritchard – guitar
- Steve Trafford – bass guitar, guitar, backing vocals
- Spencer Birtwistle – drums
- Elena Poulou – keyboards, vocals

Additional personnel

- Simon "Ding" Archer – production; bass guitar on "Youwanner" and "Trust In Me", banjo on "Clasp Hands", vocals on "Trust in Me"
- Billy Pavone – engineer, vocals on "Trust in Me", guitar on "Blindness" (US vinyl version)
- Kenny Cummings – vocals on "Trust in Me"
- Phil Schuster – vocals on "Trust in Me"
- Tim "Gracielands" Baxter – production
- Alex Aldi – engineer
