= Worst Episode Ever =

- The Simpsons episode
- Episode no.: Season 12; Episode 11
- Directed by: Matthew Nastuk
- Written by: Larry Doyle
- Production code: CABF08
- Original air date: February 4, 2001

Guest appearance
- Tom Savini as himself

Episode features
- Chalkboard gag: "I will not hide the teacher's medication"
- Couch gag: The Squeaky-Voiced Teen pushes a couch in place for the Simpsons to sit down. He leaves angrily when he does not receive a tip.
- Commentary: Mike Scully; Al Jean; Ian Maxtone-Graham; Larry Doyle; Matt Selman; Tom Gammill; Max Pross; Hank Azaria; Chris Kirkpatrick

Episode chronology
← Previous "Pokey Mom"	Next → "Tennis the Menace"
- The Simpsons season 12

"Worst Episode Ever" is the eleventh episode of the twelfth season of the American animated television series The Simpsons. It first aired on the Fox network in the United States on February 4, 2001. In the episode, Bart and Milhouse are banned from The Android's Dungeon after stopping Comic Book Guy from buying a box of priceless Star Wars memorabilia for $5. However, when Comic Book Guy suffers a massive heart attack, he hires Bart and Milhouse as his replacements while he leaves his job to pursue a relationship with Agnes Skinner.

"Worst Episode Ever" was written by Larry Doyle and directed by Matthew Nastuk. The series' staff found it hard to make Comic Book Guy seem likable, since he is usually portrayed as sarcastic and unfriendly. The episode features special make-up effects artist and actor Tom Savini as himself.

In its original broadcast, the episode was seen by about 10 million viewers, finishing in 27th place in the ratings the week it aired. Despite the episode's title, it received positive reviews from critics since its broadcast, and Hank Azaria won a Primetime Emmy Award for Outstanding Voice-Over Performance for his performance as Comic Book Guy in the episode.

== Plot ==
Bart wins a $50 bet against Homer after the latter fails to eat an entire box of spoiled baking soda that Lisa finds in the back of the refrigerator. As Bart and Milhouse spend the money, they enter The Android's Dungeon and find Martin Prince's mother trying to make a deal with Comic Book Guy to sell her son's collection of Star Wars memorabilia while Martin is at fat camp. Realizing that the items are worth far more than the $5 he is offering, the boys persuade Mrs. Prince to refuse the deal; angered, he retaliates by banning them from the store for life.

Bart and Milhouse later try to sneak into the store to see an appearance by special effects artist Tom Savini, but are discovered and turned away. Savini plays a series of tricks to embarrass Comic Book Guy, causing him to become so angry from the audience's mockery that he attempts to ban them all for life. Before he can throw them out of the store, Comic Book Guy suffers a heart attack.

At the hospital, Dr. Hibbert urges Comic Book Guy to leave the store in someone else's care while he recovers; with no one else to turn to, he reluctantly puts Bart and Milhouse in charge. The store prospers at first under the boys' management, but business falters when Milhouse places an order for 2,000 copies of an extremely unpopular comic book of a nerdy superhero he relates to without telling Bart. As the boys argue, they stumble across Comic Book Guy's secret collection of illegal videos, such as a drunk Fred Rogers, police interview footage of Ned Flanders reporting Homer for letting a radioactive ape loose in his house, and a top-secret film detailing a plan by the U.S. military to let Springfield be destroyed in the event of nuclear war. They decide to hold a midnight screening in the store's back room for the children of Springfield.

Meanwhile, Homer helps a recovering Comic Book Guy look for a friend, but his attempts fail until he meets Agnes Skinner. Comic Book Guy and Agnes become romantically involved, discovering their shared contempt for everyone and everything around them, and begin a sexual relationship. When the police raid the store, Milhouse explains that he and Bart do not own the videos. The police then raid Comic Book Guy's home and arrest him while he and Agnes are making love, and Agnes breaks off the relationship, saying that she is too old to wait for him to be released from jail. With the store now closed by the police, Bart and Milhouse reconcile and return to their normal lives as Ned tries to cope with the ape Homer let loose.

== Production ==
"Worst Episode Ever" was written by Larry Doyle and directed by Matthew Nastuk. It was first broadcast on the Fox network in the United States on February 4, 2001. The episode was originally called "The Fiver", a reference to a scene that was eventually removed. The episode title was then changed to "Worst Episode Ever", a title that amused the staff. According to Doyle, "Worst Episode Ever" is the first episode in which Comic Book Guy has a major role. Because Comic Book Guy is usually sarcastic and unfriendly, the series' staff—particularly, Hank Azaria, who voices the character—found it hard to make the character seem likable. "Comic Book Guy only ever pronounces things sarcastically", Azaria said in the DVD commentary for the episode. "It was hard to find a way to sound believable and have him say sincere things. It took a lot of different takes." Executive producer and former showrunner Mike Scully said, "It's tough when you take a character like Comic Book Guy or Krusty or Moe, to make them suddenly sympathetic and vulnerable. You have to cheat the character a little bit to open them up emotionally a little more."

In a scene in the episode, Ralph is seen entering the adult section of The Android's Dungeon. When he is off-screen, Ralph can be heard saying "Everybody's hugging". In the DVD commentary for the episode, Azaria stated that the line is one of his favorite jokes in the series. Originally, Ralph's line would be "She's hungry", but it was eventually removed from the episode.

The episode features American special effects-makeup artist and actor Tom Savini as himself. Savini accepted the role because he is friends with Dana Gould, a former staff writer on The Simpsons. In the DVD commentary for the episode, Doyle said that Savini was "really fun" when he visited to record his lines. In a scene in the episode, a crow is seen tearing apart an issue of "Biclops". The voice of the crow was recorded from a real crow, even though the staff usually use main cast members Dan Castellaneta and Nancy Cartwright to imitate animal noises. The general officer in the government film called "Secret Nuclear Defense Plan" was voiced by Azaria.

== Cultural references ==
To demonstrate the durability of Radioactive Man #1000, Comic Book Guy pours soda on it, which bounces off and instead damages a batch of "lesser" comics. On top of the batch is an issue of Bongo Comics, a comic book written by Matt Groening, creator of The Simpsons. The comedian Gallagher is shown doing his routine with a watermelon during a flashback. While in The Android's Dungeon, Nelson examines a comic book called The Death of Sad Sack, a reference to the American comic strip Sad Sack and to "The Death of Superman" story arc. When Homer and Comic Book Guy enter Moe's Tavern, Moe says, "Get out and take your Sacagawea dollars with you" to one of his customers. A Sacagawea dollar is a United States dollar coin that has been minted since 2000. After he is thrown out of Moe's Tavern, Comic Book Guy says the word "loneliness" in Klingon, a language used by the fictional Klingons in the Star Trek universe. While arguing with Agnes, Comic Book Guy says "Now I know what ever happened to Baby Jane." The line is a reference to the 1960 suspense novel What Ever Happened to Baby Jane?. Martin's mother tries to sell Comic Book Guy several items relating to the Star Wars film series, including Carrie Fisher's "anti-jiggle breast tape", George Lucas' handwritten original script of Star Wars Episode IV: A New Hope and a film of a supposed alternate ending for the series where it is revealed that "Luke's father is Chewbacca." While fighting Milhouse, Bart picks up a robotic toy, which unfolds into an axe. Milhouse picks up a similar toy, but it instead unfolds into a watering can. The toys are based on the franchise Transformers. One of the tapes that Bart and Milhouse watch shows Fred Rogers intoxicated. Executive producer and current showrunner Al Jean later met Rogers' wife at a hall of fame, and said that he was "really embarrassed" when he found out that she had seen the episode.

== Reception ==
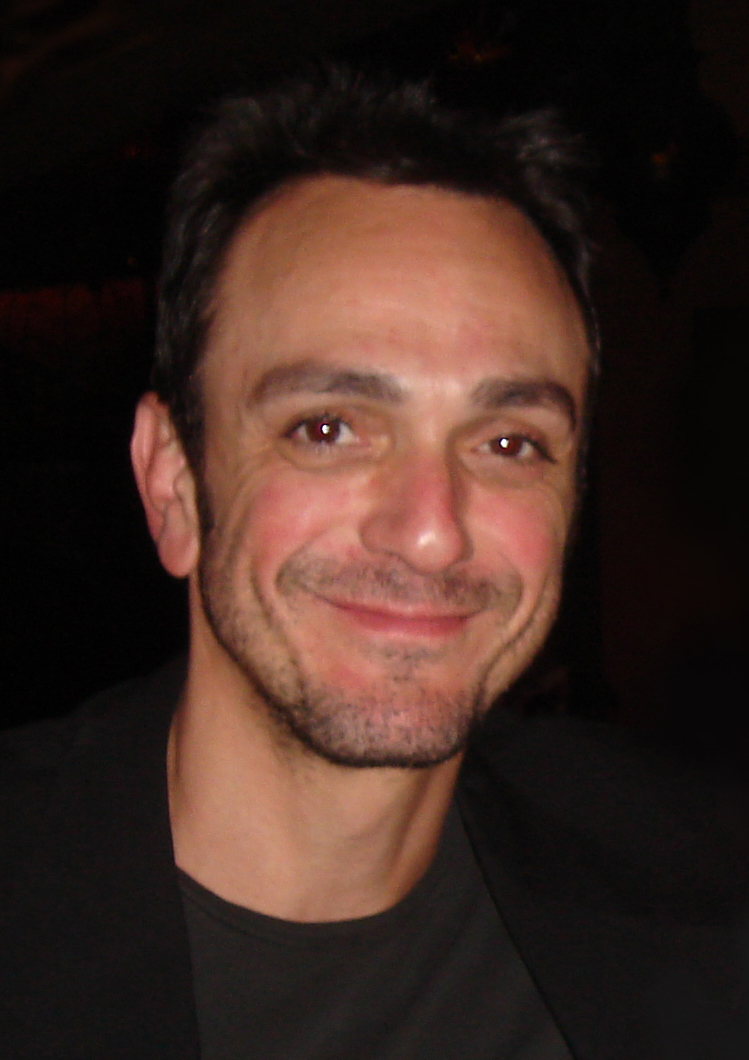
Hank Azaria won an Emmy for his portrayal of Comic Book Guy in the episode.

In its original American broadcast on February 4, 2001, "Worst Episode Ever" received a 9.8 rating, according to Nielsen Media Research, translating to about 10 million viewers. The episode finished in 27th place in the ratings for the week of January 29 – February 4, 2001. Later that year, Azaria won the 53rd Primetime Emmy Award for Outstanding Voice-Over Performance for his role as Comic Book Guy in the episode. When participating in the ceremony, the actors are only allowed to submit one episode each, and that year, Azaria said that "Worst Episode Ever" was an "obvious" choice for him. It was not the first time Azaria won the award for Outstanding Voice-Over Performance; in 1998, he won it for his portrayal of Apu Nahasapeemapetilon in the series.

On August 18, 2009, the episode was released as part of a DVD set called The Simpsons: The Complete Twelfth Season. Mike Scully, Al Jean, Tom Gammill, Max Pross, Matt Selman, Hank Azaria, Larry Doyle and Chris Kirkpatrick participated in the audio commentary for the episode.

Following its broadcast, "Worst Episode Ever" received mostly positive reviews from critics.

Casey Burchby of DVD Talk enjoyed the episode and wrote that it has some "great stuff" in it, including the comic book "Biclops" that Milhouse over-orders.

Jason Bailey, another reviewer for DVD talk, applauded the writers for making an episode around a supporting character, and wrote that it is "far from [the series' worst episode]".

Cindy White of IGN described the episode as a "classic", and in 2006, Kimberley Potts of AOL put the episode in twelfth place in a list of the series' 20 best episodes.

The episode was also well received by the series' staff; in the introduction of The Simpsons Beyond Forever!: A Complete Guide to Our Favorite Family ...Still Continued, Matt Groening wrote that he particularly enjoyed the episode and that it had a "very special story". In the DVD commentary for the episode, Doyle said that Milhouse's line "I'm a human boy, just like you" is the best line he has ever written.

However, Mac MacEntire of DVD Verdict gave the episode a mixed review. Although he praised the episode's premise, he argued that the episode was "ill-balanced" and that the subplot took up too much time in the episode.

DVD Movie Guide's Colin Jacobson criticized the writers for making an episode based around a supporting character, and argued that Comic Book Guy was not featured enough in the episode. "'Ever' spends at least as much time with Bart and Milhouse as it does with CBG and Agnes", he wrote. He concluded that, aside from having a few "good moments", the episode is overall "pretty meh".
