= The Complete Peel Sessions 1978–2004 =

Box set by The Fall
- Released: 25 April 2005
- Recorded: 30 May 1978 – 4 August 2004
- Studios: Maida Vale Studios, London
- Genre: Post-punk
- Length: 7:04:24
- Label: Castle Music
- Producers: Various; see "personnel"

The Fall compilation album chronology
50,000 Fall Fans Can't Be Wrong (2004)	The Complete Peel Sessions 1978–2004 (2005)

The Fall chronology
50,000 Fall Fans Can't Be Wrong (2004)	The Complete Peel Sessions 1978–2004 (2004)	Fall Heads Roll (2005)

The Complete Peel Sessions 1978–2004 is a compilation box set by English post-punk band the Fall. It was released in 2005 by record label Castle Music.

== Content ==
The Complete Peel Sessions comprises each of the twenty-four sessions the group recorded for John Peel's radio show. Peel was an avid supporter of the group from early in their career, and the Fall recorded more sessions for Peel's programmes than any other artist. The set was in the process of being compiled when Peel died in October 2004. The set charts almost all of the group's musical phases up until 2004.

== Release ==
The box set's release was conceived by Sanctuary Records as part of a comprehensive reissue campaign to capitalise upon the recent success of The Real New Fall LP (Formerly Country on the Click), which had been roundly praised as a "return to form" for the band. In 2004, Sanctuary issued expanded, remastered editions of the band's first four albums—Live at the Witch Trials (1979), Dragnet (1979), the (mostly) live Totale's Turns (1980), and Grotesque (After the Gramme) (1980)—as well as the first career-spanning "greatest hits" compilation, 50,000 Fall Fans Can't Be Wrong. The release of The Complete Peel Sessions was slated for summer 2005 to arrive alongside another "deluxe" reissue of the band's acclaimed fourth studio album, Hex Enduction Hour (1982).

== Reception ==
Professional ratings
Review scores
Source	Rating
AllMusic	4/5 stars
Daily Mirror	5/5 stars
Entertainment Weekly	B−
The Herald	4/5 stars
Mojo	4/5 stars
Pitchfork	9.3/10
The Times	4/5 stars
Uncut	2.5/5 stars

The Complete Peel Sessions was met with a laudatory response from critics, who generally praised it as a worthy summation of the Fall's career to date. Critics named a broad selection of highlights, though some noted an impression of inconsistency or decline in the latter portions of its seven-hour runtime. "There are now more Fall compilations and collections out there than Mark E. Smith himself can keep track of," Nigel Kendall wrote for The Times, "but if you buy only one, make it this one." Named the "Reissue of the Week" in NME, the compilation was reviewed by Rob Fitzpatrick, who said:

In a more authoritarian country than our own—say France—the very idea that one obsessive individual could, over 26 years, freely spend thousands of pounds of public money recording the absurdist ramblings of a man stumbling through a career that's clearly little more than an attempt to avoid getting up for work in the morning would, understandably, be met with angry, perhaps vicious, condemnation. In France, John Peel would have surely have been hung [sic?] in the town square long before he, or his favourite-ever band, the Fall, would have had the chance to thrill, inspire and amaze Radio 1's adventurous night-time audience with [so many] brilliantly pointed pop moments ...

In the Daily Mirror, Gavin Martin called it a "lavish, head-spinning portrait of the most undervalued band in Britain" and "confirmation of Mark E. Smith as Britrock's great anti-hero". Keith Bruce of The Herald recommended the box set for diehard fans of the Fall, who he surmised would likely focus on recordings dating to either the early 1980s period with Marc Riley or Brix Smith's time with the band the mid-1980s—although "[o]nly real anoraks," Bruce continued, "will be able to be more specific about a band that has had 30 different line ups over more than 25 years." Simon Goddard for Uncut said that the "bulk" of the BBC recordings "easily rival" the studio versions of the tracks, while a few "actually surpass" them. Although Goddard felt the set's overall range in quality was "desperately eclectic, even by the Fall's abstruse standards", it was nonetheless "hard to imagine a more satisfying or comprehensive career overview than this." At Mojo, Ian Harrison wrote it "may well be the definitive history of the Fall, from wired, punk-era beginnings on to year after year of constant mutation", noting the superiority of many of the Peel recordings to the studio versions of the same songs, and though he detected the band decline throughout the 1990s, he still found the release to be "indispensable for the fan, and a superb introduction for those wanting to be infected."

At Pitchfork, Joe Tangari wrote that the box set arguably represented "the definitive look at the Fall's career to date—even more than last year's very well-considered 50,000 Fall Fans Can't Be Wrong compilation"; however, noting its considerable length, he said "it's not the place to start, but anyone with more than four or five Fall albums would be doing themselves a huge service picking this up." Per David Jeffries at AllMusic, the immediacy of the Peel sessions format curtailed Smith's typically "flippant attitude toward practically everything" and his band's tendency to meander in a studio setting—but when recorded live and under conditions of imposed brevity, they demonstrated "an urgency and drive that's woefully absent from all but the band's best albums". The sheer quantity of highlights found on the box set, Jeffries continued, placed it "next to 50,000 Fall Fans and This Nation's Saving Grace in the Fall 'Hall of Fame.'" In a more reserved review, Entertainment Weekly's Tom Sinclair cautioned that the Fall were "a notoriously acquired taste" and "[t]he alternative to alternative", the recordings "lurch, rattle, crawl, clatter, stagger—and sometimes even rock."

=== Praise for individual tracks ===
Among the 97 total tracks on The Complete Peel Sessions, the following were cited as highlights of the set by at least one critic from the aforementioned reviews:

Tracks cited by one or more critics as highlights of The Complete Peel Sessions 1978–2004:
D#–T#	Track title	Peel Session		Critic tally	Ref.
D#–T#	Track title	No.	Recording date	Critic tally	Ref.
1–03	"Rebellious Jukebox"	1st	30 May 1978	1	
1–04	"Industrial Estate"	1st	30 May 1978	1	
1–09	"Container Drivers"	3rd	24 September 1980	1	
1–10	"Jawbone and the Air-Rifle"	3rd	24 September 1980	1	
1–12	"New Face in Hell"	3rd	24 September 1980	3	
1–15	"Hip Priest"	4th	24 March 1981	1	
1–16	"C'n'C – Hassle Schmuck"	4th	24 March 1981	1	
2–03	"Winter"	5th	15 September 1981	1	
2–05	"Smile"	6th	21 March 1983	1	
2–11	"Words of Expectation"	7th	12 December 1983	1	
2–12	"C.R.E.E.P."	7th	12 December 1983	1	
3–01	"Cruiser's Creek"	8th	14 May 1985	3	
3–03	"Spoilt Victorian Child"	8th	14 May 1985	2	
3–05	"L.A."	9th	29 September 1985	3	
3–06	"The Man Whose Head Expanded"	9th	29 September 1985	2	
3–12	"US 80's–90's"	10th	29 June 1986	1	
4–02	"Cab It Up"	12th	25 October 1988	1	
4–04	"Kurious Oranj"	12th	25 October 1988	1	
4–06	"Black Monk Theme" (The Monks cover)	13th	17 December 1989	1	
4–07	"Hilary"	13th	17 December 1989	1	
4–14	"Kimble" (Lee "Scratch" Perry cover)	15th	19 January 1992	1	
4–15	"Immortality"	15th	19 January 1992	1	
5–01	"Ladybird (Green Grass)"	16th	28 February 1993	1	
5–06	"Behind the Counter"	17th	2 December 1993	1	
5–09	"Glam Racket – Star"	18th	20 November 1994	1	
5–10	"Jingle Bell Rock" (Bobby Helms cover)	18th	20 November 1994	1	
5–11	"Hark the Herald Angels Sing" (Christmas carol cover)	18th	20 November 1994	1	
5–13	"He Pep!"	19th	7 December 1995	1	
5–13	"The City Never Sleeps" (Nancy Sinatra cover)	19th	7 December 1995	1	
5–20	"Beatle Bones 'n' Smokin' Stones" (Captain Beefheart cover)	20th	30 June 1996	2	
6–02	"Touch Sensitive"	21st	3 February 1998	1	
6–06	"Antidotes"	22nd	18 October 1998	1	
6–09	"Theme from Sparta F.C."	23rd	19 February 2003	1	
6–14	"Blindness"	24th	4 August 2004	1	
6–16	"Wrong Place, Right Time" / "I Can Hear the Grass Grow" (The Move cover)	24th	4 August 2004	1	

=== Accolades ===
The Complete Peel Sessions won Catalogue Release of the Year at the 2005 Mojo Awards, in a ceremony held at London's Porchester Hall on 16 June 2005. The award, sponsored by music retailer HMV, was intended to recognize the "reissue that is both definitive and beautifully packaged" from the preceding year. The Complete Peel Sessions bested other nominated releases from the Clash, Jeff Buckley, the Mamas & the Papas, the Kinks and Jack Nitzsche.

The Complete Peel Sessions appeared on several critics' year-end lists for 2005. In a feature by Stewart Lee, The Sunday Times named it the third-best record of 2005. David Fricke of Rolling Stone ranked the compilation eighth on the magazine's list of the year's top 10 reissues. The Sun critic Simon Cosyns named it among the year's 11 best box sets on a list that was unranked aside from the top spot, designated for Blue Guitars by Chris Rea.

Meanwhile, in early 2006 the record industry periodical Music Week commended Will Nicol and Steve Hammonds of Sanctuary Records for conducting one of the year's most effective marketing campaigns based on promotion of an established musical act's back catalogue. Music Week named the campaign for The Complete Peel Sessions among four finalists for the year's best "catalogue campaign", with Sony BMG's promotion of the Elvis Presley compilation #1 Singles claiming the top spot.

== Track listing ==
Some tracks appear under titles different from those attached to their studio incarnations. Although most differences are slight, the tracks are listed by the titles they were given at the relevant session.

=== Disc one ===
Session 1, recorded 30 May 1978; first broadcast 15 June 1978
No.	Title	Writer(s)	Length
1.	"Futures and Pasts"	Mark E. Smith, Martin Bramah	2:35
2.	"Mother-Sister!"	M. Smith, Una Baines	3:07
3.	"Rebellious Jukebox"	M. Smith, Bramah	2:59
4.	"Industrial Estate"	M. Smith, Bramah, Tony Friel	1:44

Session 2, recorded 27 November 1978; first broadcast 6 December 1978
No.	Title	Writer(s)	Length
5.	"Put Away"	M. Smith	3:33
6.	"Mess of My"	M. Smith, Bramah, Rick Goldstraw	3:13
7.	"No Xmas for John Quays"	M. Smith	4:12
8.	"Like to Blow"	M. Smith, Bramah	1:46

Session 3, recorded 16 September 1980; first broadcast 24 September 1980
No.	Title	Writer(s)	Length
9.	"Container Drivers"	M. Smith, Craig Scanlon, Marc Riley, Steve Hanley, Paul Hanley	3:38
10.	"Jawbone and the Air-Rifle"	The Fall	3:22
11.	"New Puritan"	M. Smith, Scanlon, Riley, S. Hanley	7:13
12.	"New Face in Hell"	M. Smith, Scanlon, Riley	5:02

Session 4, recorded 24 March 1981; first broadcast 31 March 1981
No.	Title	Writer(s)	Length
13.	"Middlemass"	M. Smith, Scanlon, Riley, S. Hanley	3:53
14.	"Lie Dream of a Casino Soul"	M. Smith, Scanlon, Riley, P. Hanley	2:41
15.	"Hip Priest"	M. Smith, Scanlon, Riley, S. Hanley	9:23
16.	"C'n'C – Hassle Schmuck"	M. Smith, Scanlon, Riley, S. Hanley (Note: "Hassle Schmuck", the latter half of the track, is a parody of Coast to Coast's 1981 Top 5 hit (Do) The Hucklebuck, written by Andy Gibson and Roy Alfred. "C' n' C-S.Mithering". Reformation!.)	4:13

=== Disc two ===
Session 5, recorded 26 August 1981; first broadcast 15 September 1981
No.	Title	Writer(s)	Length
1.	"Deer Park"	M. Smith, Scanlon, Riley, Karl Burns	4:26
2.	"Look, Know"	M. Smith, Riley, S. Hanley, Burns	5:05
3.	"Winter"	M. Smith, Scanlon	8:03
4.	"Who Makes the Nazis?"	M. Smith	2:54

Session 6, recorded 21 March 1983; first broadcast 23 March 1983
No.	Title	Writer(s)	Length
5.	"Smile"	M. Smith, Scanlon	5:10
6.	"Garden"	M. Smith, Scanlon	10:00
7.	"Hexen Definitive – Strife Knot"	M. Smith, Scanlon, Burns, Adrian Niman	9:07
8.	"Eat Y'Self Fitter"	M. Smith, S. Hanley	7:01

Session 7, recorded 12 December 1983; first broadcast 3 January 1984
No.	Title	Writer(s)	Length
9.	"Pat Trip Dispenser"	M. Smith, Brix Smith	4:08
10.	"2 × 4"	M. Smith, B. Smith	4:15
11.	"Words of Expectation" (not broadcast)	M. Smith, B. Smith, Burns, S. Hanley, P. Hanley (Note: Not released officially until 1993's Kimble EP, where it was credited to Mark E. Smith, Craig Scanlon and Steve Hanley.)	9:14
12.	"C.R.E.E.P."	M. Smith, B. Smith, Scanlon, S. Hanley, P. Hanley	2:36

=== Disc three ===
Session 8, recorded 14 May 1985; first broadcast 3 June 1985
No.	Title	Writer(s)	Length
1.	"Cruiser's Creek"	M. Smith, B. Smith	5:49
2.	"Couldn't Get Ahead"	M. Smith, B. Smith	2:33
3.	"Spoilt Victorian Child"	M. Smith, Simon Rogers	4:55
4.	"Gut of the Quantifier"	M. Smith, B. Smith, Burns, Rogers	4:42

Session 9, recorded 29 September 1985; first broadcast 7 October 1985
No.	Title	Writer(s)	Length
5.	"L.A."	M. Smith, B. Smith	4:34
6.	"The Man Whose Head Expanded"	M. Smith, Scanlon, S. Hanley (Note: Alternatively credited on original single release to Mark E. Smith, Craig Scanlon, Steve Hanley and Sol Seaburg.)	5:13
7.	"What You Need"	M. Smith, Scanlon	5:52
8.	"Faust Banana" (aka "Dktr. Faustus")	M. Smith, Scanlon	5:06

Session 10, recorded 29 June 1986; first broadcast 9 July 1986
No.	Title	Writer(s)	Length
9.	"Hot Aftershave Bop"	M. Smith, S. Hanley	3:10
10.	"R.O.D."	M. Smith, B. Smith, Scanlon, Rogers, Simon Wolstencroft	4:26
11.	"Gross Chapel – GB Grenadiers"	M. Smith, Scanlon, S. Hanley	6:21
12.	"US 80's–90's"	M. Smith, B. Smith	4:53

Session 11, recorded 28 April 1987; first broadcast 19 May 1987
No.	Title	Writer(s)	Length
13.	"Athlete Cured"	M. Smith	4:45
14.	"Australians in Europe"	M. Smith	5:42
15.	"Twister"	M. Smith, B. Smith	4:16
16.	"Guest Informant"	M. Smith, Scanlon, S. Hanley	4:09

=== Disc four ===
Session 12, recorded 25 October 1988; first broadcast 31 October 1988
No.	Title	Writer(s)	Length
1.	"Deadbeat Descendant"	M. Smith, B. Smith	2:17
2.	"Cab It Up"	M. Smith	4:40
3.	"Squid Lord" (aka "Squid Law")	M. Smith, Scanlon, S. Hanley	3:48
4.	"Kurious Oranj"	M. Smith, S. Hanley, Wolstencroft	5:57

Session 13, recorded 17 December 1989; first broadcast 1 January 1990
No.	Title	Writer(s)	Length
5.	"Chicago Now"	M. Smith	5:33
6.	"Black Monk Theme" (The Monks cover; originally titled "I Hate You")	The Monks	4:05
7.	"Hilary"	M. Smith	2:22
8.	"Whizz Bang" (not broadcast; later reworked as "Butterflies 4 Brains")	M. Smith, Scanlon, S. Hanley, Wolstencroft	2:59

Session 14, recorded 5 March 1991; first broadcast 23 March 1991
No.	Title	Writer(s)	Length
9.	"The War Against Intelligence"	M. Smith, Scanlon	3:02
10.	"Idiot Joy Showland"	M. Smith, S. Hanley	3:46
11.	"A Lot of Wind"	M. Smith	5:25
12.	"The Mixer"	M. Smith, Scanlon, Wolstencroft (Note: Credited on the 1991 and 2002 editions of the Shift-Work album to Mark E. Smith and Craig Scanlon, and on the 2007 edition to Mark E. Smith, Craig Scanlon and Robert Gordon)	4:32

Session 15, recorded 19 January 1992; first broadcast 15 February 1992
No.	Title	Writer(s)	Length
13.	"Free Range"	M. Smith, Wolstencroft	4:05
14.	"Kimble" (Lee "Scratch" Perry cover)	Lee Perry	3:53
15.	"Immortality"	Smith, Scanlon	4:27
16.	"Return"	M. Smith, S. Hanley	4:11

=== Disc five ===
Session 16, recorded 28 February 1993; first broadcast 13 March 1993
No.	Title	Writer(s)	Length
1.	"Ladybird (Green Grass)"	M. Smith, Scanlon, S. Hanley, Wolstencroft, Dave Bush	4:04
2.	"Strychnine" (The Sonics cover)	Gerry Roslie	2:54
3.	"Service"	M. Smith, Scanlon, S. Hanley	3:35
4.	"Paranoia Man in Cheap Sh*t Room"	M. Smith, Scanlon	4:17

Session 17, recorded 8 December 1993; broadcast 5 February 1994
No.	Title	Writer(s)	Length
5.	"M5"	M. Smith, Bush, Wolstencroft (Note: Credited on Middle Class Revolt to Mark E. Smith, Craig Scanlon and Steve Hanley.)	3:08
6.	"Behind the Counter"	M. Smith, Burns (Note: Credited on Middle Class Revolt to Mark E. Smith, Craig Scanlon and Steve Hanley.)	4:03
7.	"Reckoning"	M. Smith, Scanlon, S. Hanley	3:40
8.	"Hey! Student"	M. Smith (Note: Credited on Middle Class Revolt to Mark E. Smith, Craig Scanlon and Steve Hanley.)	4:09

Session 18, recorded 20 November 1994; first broadcast 17 December 1994
No.	Title	Writer(s)	Length
9.	"Glam Racket – Star"	M. Smith, Scanlon, S. Hanley	3:20
10.	"Jingle Bell Rock" (Bobby Helms cover; with substantially different lyrics to the original 1957 song)	Joe Beal, Jim Boothe	1:08
11.	"Hark the Herald Angels Sing" (Christmas carol cover)	Felix Mendelssohn, Charles Wesley; arranged by M. Smith	3:09
12.	"Numb at the Lodge" (aka "Feeling Numb")	M. Smith, B. Smith	3:00

Session 19, recorded 17 December 1995; first broadcast 22 December 1995
No.	Title	Writer(s)	Length
13.	"He Pep!"	M. Smith, Wolstencroft	4:15
14.	"Oleano"	M. Smith	3:08
15.	"Chilinist"	M. Smith, S. Hanley, Burns, Wolstencroft, Julia Nagle, Mike Bennett	5:20
16.	"The City Never Sleeps" (Nancy Sinatra cover; originally titled "The City Never Sleeps at Night")	Lee Hazlewood	2:55

Session 20, recorded 30 June 1996; first broadcast 18 August 1996
No.	Title	Writer(s)	Length
17.	"D.I.Y. Meat"	M. Smith, B. Smith	2:32
18.	"Spinetrak"	M. Smith, B. Smith	2:39
19.	"Spencer" (aka "Spencer Must Die")	M. Smith, Simon Spencer	3:34
20.	"Beatle Bones 'n' Smokin' Stones" (Captain Beefheart cover)	Don Van Vliet	3:40

=== Disc six ===
Session 21, recorded 3 February 1998; first broadcast 3 March 1998
No.	Title	Writer(s)	Length
1.	"Calendar"	M. Smith, Damon Gough	3:00
2.	"Touch Sensitive"	M. Smith, Nagle, Steve Hitchcock (Note: Credited on the 2011 reissue of The Marshall Suite to Mark E. Smith and Julia Nagle.)	3:35
3.	"Masquerade"	M. Smith, Nagle (Note: Credited on the "Masquerade" single to Mark E. Smith, Julia Nagle, Steve Hanley and Karl Burns.)	6:33
4.	"Jungle Rock" (Hank Mizell cover)	Hank Mizell, Jim Bobo, Bill Collins, Ralph Simonton	6:21

Session 22, recorded 18 October 1998; first broadcast 4 November 1998
No.	Title	Writer(s)	Length
5.	"Bound Soul One" (aka "Bound"; The Audio Arts Strings cover; originally titled "Love Bound")	Smith, Frank Wilson, Henry Wilson, Vance Wilson, David Lee Cason (Note: Instrumental to which Smith added lyrics.)	3:50
6.	"Antidotes"	M. Smith, Nagle	4:57
7.	"Shake-Off"	M. Smith, Nagle, Hitchcock, Tom Head, Karen Leatham, Neville Wilding (Note: Credited on the original 1999 edition of The Marshall Suite to Mark E. Smith, Steve Hitchcock, Karen Leatham and Tom Head.)	1:43
8.	"This Perfect Day" (The Saints cover)	Chris Bailey, Ed Kuepper	2:15

Session 23, recorded 19 February 2003; first broadcast 13 March 2003
No.	Title	Writer(s)	Length
9.	"Theme from Sparta F.C."	M. Smith, Jim Watts, Ben Pritchard	3:53
10.	"Contraflow"	M. Smith, Watts (Note: Credited on The Complete Peel Sessions 1978–2004 to Mark E. Smith and Dave Milner.)	4:05
11.	"Groovin' With Mr. Bloe" / "Green-Eyed Loco Man" ( (Note: "Groovin' With Mr. Bloe" was originally recorded by the US studio group Wind in 1969, and later by Mr. Bloe. The Fall's session version only lasts for one minute before segueing into "Green-Eyed Loco Man". "Groovin' With Mr. Bloe". Reformation!.))	Bo Gentry, Paul Naumann, Kenny Laguna / M. Smith, Watts (Note: "Groovin' With Mr. Bloe" is credited on The Complete Peel Sessions 1978–2004 to Bo Gentry, Paul Naumann, Kenny Laguna and Bernard Cochrane.)	6:06
12.	"Mere Pseud Mag. Ed."	M. Smith (Note: Credited on The Complete Peel Sessions 1978–2004 to Mark E. Smith and Marc Riley.)	3:17

Session 24, recorded 4 August 2004; first broadcast 12 August 2004
No.	Title	Writer(s)	Length
13.	"Clasp Hands"	M. Smith, Steve Trafford	4:41
14.	"Blindness"	M. Smith, Spencer Birtwistle	6:28
15.	"What About Us?"	M. Smith, Elena Poulou	5:52
16.	"Wrong Place, Right Time" / "I Can Hear the Grass Grow" (The Move cover)	M. Smith / Roy Wood	7:00
17.	"Job Search" (bonus track) ( (Note: Recorded during Session 24 but not broadcast. It was pressed onto an acetate (coupled with a similarly exclusive track by Half Man Half Biscuit) and given to John Peel for his 65th Birthday on 31 August 2004. Peel played the track on air that night, making it the final track by the group to debut on his show. "Job Search". Reformation!.))	M. Smith	4:20

== Personnel ==
Session 1, 30 May 1978

- Mark E. Smith – vocals
- Martin Bramah – guitar, bass guitar, backing vocals
- Yvonne Pawlett – keyboards
- Karl Burns – drums
- Steve Davies – congas
- Tony Wilson – production
- Mike Robinson – engineering

Session 2, 27 November 1978

- Mark E. Smith – vocals
- Martin Bramah – guitar, bass guitar, backing vocals
- Marc Riley – bass guitar
- Yvonne Pawlett – keyboards
- Karl Burns – drums
- Bob Sargeant – production
- Brian Tuck – engineering
- Dave Dade – engineering

Session 3, 24 September 1980

- Mark E. Smith – vocals, keyboards, kazoo, guitar
- Marc Riley – guitar, keyboards, backing vocals
- Craig Scanlon – guitar, backing vocals
- Steve Hanley – bass guitar
- Paul Hanley – drums
- John Sparrow – production

Session 4, 24 March 1981

- Mark E. Smith – vocals
- Marc Riley – keyboards, guitar, backing vocals
- Craig Scanlon – guitar, backing vocals
- Steve Hanley – bass
- Paul Hanley – drums
- Dave Tucker – clarinet
- Dale Griffin – production
- Martyn Parker – engineering

Session 5, 15 September 1981

- Mark E. Smith – vocals, tapes
- Marc Riley – guitar, keyboards
- Craig Scanlon – guitar
- Steve Hanley – bass, toy guitar, voice
- Paul Hanley – drums
- Dale Griffin – production
- Nick Gomm – engineering

Session 6, 21 March 1983

- Mark E. Smith – vocals, keyboards
- Craig Scanlon – guitar, backing vocals
- Steve Hanley – bass, backing vocals
- Paul Hanley – drums, backing vocals
- Karl Burns – drums, bass, backing vocals
- John Porter – production
- Dave Dade – engineering

Session 7, 12 December 1983

- Mark E. Smith – vocals, tapes
- Craig Scanlon – guitar
- Brix Smith – guitar, vocals
- Steve Hanley – bass
- Paul Hanley – drums, keyboards
- Karl Burns – drums, bass
- Tony Wilson – production
- Martin Colley – engineering

Session 8, 14 May 1985

- Mark E. Smith – vocals
- Craig Scanlon – guitar
- Brix Smith – guitar, vocals
- Steve Hanley – bass
- Simon Rogers – guitar, keyboards
- Karl Burns – drums
- Mark Radcliffe – production
- Mike Walter – engineering

Session 9, 29 September 1985

- Mark E. Smith – vocals
- Craig Scanlon – guitar
- Brix Smith – guitar, keyboards, vocals
- Steve Hanley – bass, xylophone
- Simon Rogers – guitar, keyboards
- Karl Burns – drums
- Dale Griffin – production
- Mike Engles – engineering

Session 10, 29 June 1986

- Mark E. Smith – vocals
- Craig Scanlon – guitar, backing vocals
- Brix Smith – guitar, backing vocals
- Steve Hanley – bass, backing vocals
- Simon Rogers – guitar, keyboards
- Simon Wolstencroft – drums
- Dale Griffin – production
- Mike Engles – engineering

Session 11, 28 April 1987

- Mark E. Smith – vocals
- Craig Scanlon – guitar
- Brix Smith – guitar, vocals
- Steve Hanley – bass, backing vocals
- Simon Rogers – keyboards, guitar
- Simon Wolstencroft – drums
- Production details unknown

Session 12, 25 October 1988

- Mark E. Smith – vocals, tapes
- Craig Scanlon – guitar
- Brix Smith – guitar, backing vocals
- Steve Hanley – bass
- Marcia Schofield – keyboards, backing vocals
- Simon Wolstencroft – drums
- Mike Robinson – production, engineering

Session 13, 17 December 1989

- Mark E. Smith – vocals
- Craig Scanlon – guitar
- Martin Bramah – guitar
- Steve Hanley – bass
- Marcia Schofield – keyboards, backing vocals
- Simon Wolstencroft – drums
- Kenny Brady – fiddle
- Dale Griffin – production
- Mike Engles – engineering

Session 14, 5 March 1991

- Mark E. Smith – vocals
- Craig Scanlon – guitar
- Steve Hanley – bass
- Simon Wolstencroft – drums
- Kenny Brady – fiddle
- Mike Robinson – production, engineering

Session 15, 19 January 1992

- Mark E. Smith – vocals, tapes
- Craig Scanlon – guitar
- Steve Hanley – bass
- Dave Bush – keyboards
- Simon Wolstencroft – drums
- Dale Griffin – production
- James Birtwistle – engineering
- Mike Engles – engineering

Session 16, 28 February 1993

- Mark E. Smith – vocals
- Craig Scanlon – guitar
- Steve Hanley – bass
- Dave Bush – keyboards
- Simon Wolstencroft – drums
- Mike Robinson – production
- James Birtwistle – engineering

Session 17, 2 December 1993

- Mark E. Smith – vocals
- Craig Scanlon – guitar
- Steve Hanley – bass
- Dave Bush – keyboards
- Simon Wolstencroft – drums
- Karl Burns – drums, guitar
- Nick Gomm – production
- Paul Long – engineering

Session 18, 20 November 1994

- Mark E. Smith – vocals
- Craig Scanlon – guitar
- Brix Smith – guitar, bass, vocals
- Steve Hanley – bass
- Dave Bush – keyboards
- Simon Wolstencroft – drums
- Karl Burns – guitar
- James Birtwistle – production
- Paul Allen – engineering

Session 19, 7 December 1995

- Mark E. Smith – vocals, guitar
- Brix Smith – guitar, vocals
- Julia Nagle – keyboards, guitar
- Steve Hanley – bass
- Simon Wolstencroft – drums
- Karl Burns – guitar, keyboards
- Lucy Rimmer – vocals
- Nick Gomm – production
- Adam Askew – engineering

Session 20, 30 June 1996

- Mark E. Smith – vocals
- Brix Smith – guitar, vocals
- Julia Nagle – keyboards, guitar
- Steve Hanley – bass
- Simon Wolstencroft – drums
- Ted de Bono – production
- Lisa Softley – engineering

Session 21, 3 February 1998

- Mark E. Smith – vocals, guitar
- Julia Nagle – guitar, keyboards, backing vocals
- Steve Hanley – bass
- Karl Burns – drums, backing vocals
- John Rolleson – backing vocals
- Mike Robinson – production
- Nick Scripps – engineering

Session 22, 18 October 1998

- Mark E. Smith – vocals
- Neville Wilding – guitar
- Tom Head – drums
- Elspeth Hughes – special effects
- Mike Engels – production
- Kevin Rumble – engineering

Session 23, 19 February 2003

- Mark E. Smith – vocals
- Ben Pritchard – guitar, backing vocals
- Jim Watts – bass guitar, backing vocals
- Elena Poulou – keyboards, backing vocals
- Dave Milner – drums, backing vocals
- Mick Middles – backing vocals
- Louise Kattenhorn – production
- Mike Walter – engineering

Session 24, 4 August 2004

- Mark E. Smith – vocals, percussion
- Ben Pritchard – guitar, backing vocals
- Jim Watts – guitar, bass guitar
- Elena Poulou – keyboards, backing vocals
- Steve Trafford – bass guitar, guitar
- Spencer Birtwistle – drums
- Ed Blaney – guitar
- Jerry Smith – production
- Nick Fountain – engineering
