= Nobody's Perfect (The Distractions album) =

Studio album by The Distractions
- Released: 1980
- Genre: New wave, power pop, punk rock
- Label: Island

Nobody's Perfect is the debut album by UK new wave band The Distractions. Following the records's poor sales, the band split in 1981, the album remaining The Distractions' only LP.

Quantick later used the song "Valerie" from the album on a BBC Radio 4 documentary called "The Disappearing Art Of The Mix Tape".

== Reception ==
Professional ratings
Review scores
Source	Rating
Allmusic	4.5/5 stars
Smash Hits	8/10

Writing for Smash Hits in 1980, David Hepworth described Nodbody's Perfect as an "enchanting and vaguely disturbing collection of vulnerable pop". Hepworth went on to say that the album could be "the most attractive and hardest wearing debut album since The Pretenders".

In a 1987 "Rewind" article on the band written for the NME, David Quantick described the album as follows:

Nobody's Perfect was The Distractions' chance to expand on their nascent genius and by golly, they did...[they] pulled every pop stop out and made a quietly glorious record. It was modern, yet it harked back through pop history; it was melancholy and it was daft; all the good pop stuff.

== Track listing ==
1. "Waiting For Lorraine"
2. "Something For The Weekend"
3. "Boyscry"
4. "Sick and Tired"
5. "Leave You To Dream"
6. "Louise"
7. "Paracetamol Paralysis"
8. "(Stuck In A) Fantasy"
9. "Nothing"
10. "Wonder Girl"
11. "Still It Doesn't Ring"
12. "Untitled"
13. "Looking For A Ghost"
14. "Valerie"
