= Arthur Kadmon =

English guitarist

- Also known as: Arthur Cadmon, Arthur Cadman
- Born: Peter John Sadler; 19 February 1958 (age 68); Stockport, Cheshire, England
- Genres: Punk rock; new wave; post-punk
- Occupations: Songwriter; guitarist
- Instrument: Guitar

Arthur Kadmon (born Peter John Sadler, 19 February 1958) is an English guitarist who worked with different new wave bands from Manchester, England, including Manicured Noise, Ludus, the Distractions and the Fall.

In 1978, after being in post-punk band Manicured Noise, he formed another post-punk band, Ludus, alongside art designer Linder Sterling. He was a formative figure in the band, playing with them from 1978 to early 1979. He departed after a tour supporting the Buzzcocks. During his time with the band only two unreleased studio demos were made, while the rest of the group's repertoire were recorded and released with Kadmon's replacement, Ian Devine.

By the time he left Ludus, he recorded with Mike Ellis of hard rock band Aragorn.

By 1980, Kadmon resurfaced joining the Distractions, although the group disbanded the following year.

After the Distractions split, Kadmon played with the Fall, although only on the "Hard Life in Country" song for the Room to Live album. The group's frontman Mark E. Smith admired Kadmon, calling him to collaborate, but he disappointed shortly after, although Smith continued to consider Kadmon as a genius and "one of the great people in Manchester who never got anywhere". On the album he was erroneously credited as Arthur Cadman.

He reappeared in 1987 alongside Deborah Shure in a new band, Kiss Kiss Bang Bang, which released one single, "High Heels".

He suffered a stroke in June 2013, and continues to perform as a speaker, guitar player and songwriter. He wrote a diary of his stroke and recovery, noting he is improving his mobility in his right leg, arm and hand.

In 2014 as Pieter Egriega, he was awarded the UK Stroke Association's Award for Creative Arts. Following this award he then began writing Fringe Arts Shows, first with Cupid Stunts and Plenty of Fish at Manchester Comedy Fringe Festival in 2015, and then winning the Best Small Group/Ensemble Award at the 2016 Buxton Fringe Festival for Extraordinary People Ordinary Lives.

In 2017, he created a new way to showcase his songs with a show again at Buxton Fringe Festival called Mr Different, which prompted several positive reviews.
