= Nobody's Perfect (2004 film) =

- Directed by: Hank Azaria
- Written by: Hank Azaria; Jay Kogen; Andrew Hill Newman
- Produced by: Hank Azaria; Rod Hamilton; Scott Allen Logan
- Starring: Hank Azaria; Ellen Pompeo; Maria Bello; Jeffrey Tambor
- Cinematography: Tom Richmond
- Edited by: Michelle Harrison
- Music by: Richard Ziegler
- Release dates: January 2004 (Sundance Film Festival); March 3, 2004 (The Comedy Festival May 8, 2004 (Maryland Film Festival); October 14, 2004 (Austin Film Festival)
- Running time: 25 minutes
- Country: United States
- Language: English

Nobody's Perfect is a 2004 American short film directed, produced, written and starred by Hank Azaria.
