= Room to Live =

Studio album by The Fall
- Released: 27 September 1982
- Recorded: June–July 1982
- Studio: Cargo Studios, Rochdale, England
- Genre: Post-punk; art punk
- Length: 36:46
- Label: Kamera
- Producer: Kay O'Sullivan; John Brierley; Mark E. Smith

The Fall chronology
A Part of America Therein, 1981 (1982)	Room to Live (1982)	Fall in a Hole (1983)

Singles from Room to Live
- 1. "Marquis Cha-Cha" Released: November 1983

Room to Live, subtitled Undilutable Slang Truth!, is the fifth studio album by the English post-punk band the Fall. It was released on 27 September 1982 through record label Kamera.

== Background ==
Room to Live was recorded as a quick followup to Hex Enduction Hour, which had been released in March of the same year. It was to be Marc Riley's last album with the group.

The group had originally entered the studio to record a single, but Mark E. Smith prevailed upon them to record more songs, all of which were new to the band and had not previously been rehearsed or performed live. In accordance with this experimental approach, members were deliberately excluded from certain tracks. Smith also stated of the songs that "some of them are just me and Karl double-tracked" Whilst these remarks resulted in considerable conjecture among fans, the exact lineups for each track have never been properly confirmed. In a letter to City Life magazine in April 1984, Smith noted that Riley only played on two tracks on Room to Live, and in 2008 Riley confirmed via his BBC6 radio show that he did not appear on all tracks. In his book "The Big Midweek", Steve Hanley states that "Marquis Cha-Cha" was recorded by a trio of himself, Burns and Smith and also confirms the role of Arthur Kadmon (from Ludus and credited as "Cadman") in the recording of "Hard Life in Country" at a session to which neither Craig Scanlon nor Marc Riley were invited. Hanley's version, however, appears to refute the much-rumoured story, as relayed by Mick Middles in his book "The Fall" (co-authored with Mark E Smith), that suggested that Kadmon recorded approximately sixteen seconds of guitar and was then dismissed. Drummer Paul Hanley described the recording of the album as "a fucking nightmare. You'd turn up and find Smith had only invited half the band, or brought in other musicians without telling anyone!".

The album was recorded at Cargo Studios in Rochdale over a two-week period prior to the group's tour of Australia and New Zealand in July and August 1982, and thus songs from the record feature heavily on the live album Fall in a Hole.

Room to Live has been described as the band's most overtly topical album. Smith described it as "me going off on a tangent...most of the songs are about Britain as I see it on a wider scale, having been abroad a lot." "Papal Visit" was about the first visit of a Pope to Britain in 450 years, a song Smith described as 'anti-Pope'. "Marquis Cha-Cha" concerned the Falklands War, the titular character described as "a Falklands-flavoured equivalent to the English-born Nazi propagandist Lord Haw Haw".

"Marquis Cha-Cha" was originally scheduled for a single release in September 1982, but was shelved and not released until November 1983.

== Critical reception ==
Professional ratings
Review scores
Source	Rating
AllMusic	4/5 stars
The Encyclopedia of Popular Music	3/5 stars
NME	unfavourable
Sounds	2/5 stars

The album was described as "slapped together and half-baked" and "rough around the edges" compared to Hex Enduction Hour, although this was considered by writer Dave Thompson (who described it as "the sound of the band at its most spontaneous, the sound of Smith at his most inchoate") to be intentional, and Smith himself stated "I wanted to do something spontaneous...to get back to the old Fall way of recording songs straight off the top of our heads".

Sounds reviewer Dave McCullough gave it two stars, stating that it "lacks bounce and zap" and "musically, the Fall really are a mess". The NME's Amrik Rai called it "frustratingly sketchy" and stating that it "sounds as if they've written, recorded and pressed it and still got back in time for last orders", going on to sum it up as "right crap".

(The New) Rolling Stone Album Guide stated that the album "sports fabulously irritated lyrics aimed squarely at bourgeois Britain, undercut by thinner, less compelling music, and an uninterested-sounding Smith." It was also described as "a more self-indulgent delivery" than its predecessor. Trouser Press commented on "a sparser, less rhythmic sound than Hex Enduction Hour", going on to say "Smith is in top lyrical form, with pungent, satirical views of British life: 'Marquis Cha Cha' offers biting commentary on the Falklands War." AllMusic's Dean McFarlane described it as "possibly the most archly political and scathing collection of diatribes the Manchester legend spewed forth onto record during what is arguably the group's creative peak" and "one of the greatest pieces of post-punk genius the group ever recorded". Robert Ham, writing for Stereogum was less enthusiastic, stating "Were it not for the seamy bass-and-scratching guitar minimalism of 'Detective Instinct' and the jaunty 'Solicitor in Studio', this would be a complete throwaway."

Room to Live peaked at number 4 in the UK Independent Albums Chart, spending ten weeks on the chart in total.

== Track listing ==
Side A
No.	Title	Writer(s)	Length
1.	"Joker Hysterical Face"	Mark E. Smith, Steve Hanley, Marc Riley	4:51
2.	"Marquis Cha-Cha"	Smith, Karl Burns	4:34
3.	"Hard Life in Country"	Smith, Arthur Cadman	6:16
4.	"Room to Live"	Smith, Craig Scanlon	4:16

Side B
No.	Title	Writer(s)	Length
1.	"Detective Instinct"	Smith, S. Hanley, Burns	5:45
2.	"Solicitor in Studio"	Smith, Burns, Scanlon	5:24
3.	"Papal Visit"	Smith	5:40

2005 CD reissue bonus tracks
No.	Title	Writer(s)	Length
8.	"Joker Hysterical Face" (live at Derby Hall, Bury, 27 April 1982)	Smith, Riley, S. Hanley	4:47
9.	"Medley: Town Called Crappy/Solicitor in Studio" (live at Hammersmith Palais, London, 25 March 1982)	Smith, Scanlon, Burns	6:30
10.	"Hard Life in Country" (live at Union Hall at Victoria University of Wellington, New Zealand, 19 August 1982)	Smith, Cadman	8:32
11.	"Detective Instinct" (live at Lesser Free Trading Hall, Manchester, 22 December 1982)	Smith, S. Hanley, Burns	7:12
12.	"Room to Live" (live at Arena, Rotterdam, the Netherlands, 12 February 1983)	Smith, Scanlon	4:32
13.	"Words of Expectation" (live at Larry's Hideaway, Toronto, Canada, 21 April 1983)	Smith, Scanlon, S. Hanley	9:13

Notes

The 1983 German pressing of the album added the 1981 single "Lie Dream of a Casino Soul" and its B-side, "Fantastic Life", to the end of side B. This inclusion was repeated on the first UK CD edition of the album issued via Cog Sinister in 1998 (mastered from a particularly noisy German vinyl copy) but was removed on the 2005 remaster (from the superior original Kamera vinyl), since the two tracks had since been included in the Slates reissue. Other contemporaneous bonus material was added in its place. The album was reissued on vinyl in 2016 with its original track listing on the Superior Viaduct label.

== Personnel ==
The Fall

- Mark E. Smith – vocals, violin, guitar, tapes, production on "Papal Visit"
- Steve Hanley – bass guitar
- Craig Scanlon – guitar
- Karl Burns – drums, guitar, bass guitar, percussion, zither, feedback
- Paul Hanley – drums
- Marc Riley – guitar, keyboards

Additional personnel

- Arthur Kadmon (misspelt as "Cadman") – guitar on "Hard Life in Country" and "Room to Live"
- Adrian Niman – saxophone on "Room to Live"

Technical

- Kay O'Sullivan (Kay Carroll) – production (bar tracks 4 and 7)
- John Brierley – production on "Room to Live"
