= I'm Goin' to Praiseland =

- The Simpsons episode
- Episode no.: Season 12; Episode 19
- Directed by: Chuck Sheetz
- Written by: Julie Thacker
- Production code: CABF15
- Original air date: May 6, 2001

Guest appearance
- Shawn Colvin as Rachel Jordan

Episode features
- Chalkboard gag: "Genetics is not an excuse"
- Couch gag: A cement truck pours out concrete statues of the Simpson family. The head of Homer's statue breaks off and falls at his feet.
- Commentary: Mike Scully; Al Jean; Ian Maxtone-Graham; Carolyn Omine; Don Payne; Matt Selman; Tom Gammill; Chuck Sheetz

Episode chronology
← Previous "Trilogy of Error"	Next → "Children of a Lesser Clod"
- The Simpsons season 12

"I'm Goin' to Praiseland" is the nineteenth episode of the twelfth season of the American animated television series The Simpsons. It originally aired on the Fox network in the United States on May 6, 2001. In the episode, Ned Flanders builds a Christian-themed amusement park to commemorate his dead wife, Maude Flanders. The episode marked the return of the character Rachel Jordan (voiced by Shawn Colvin), who had previously appeared in the season eleven episode "Alone Again, Natura-Diddily". Since airing, "I'm Goin' to Praiseland" has received mixed reviews from critics.

== Plot ==
During an ice cream social at church, Ned Flanders reunites with Rachel Jordan, a woman he met after hearing her and her Christian rock band sing at church after suffering the loss of his wife Maude. Rachel decides to stay with Ned for the night, but leaves after waking up to find Ned, whom she notices has not gotten over Maude's death, cutting her hair to resemble Maude's. Ned asks the Simpson family to help him forget about Maude by throwing away everything in the house that reminds him of her except for a sketchbook. Ned looks through her many sketches until he finds designs for a Christian theme park, called Praiseland. With the encouragement of his sons and the Simpsons, he decides to fulfill Maude's dream by building a Christian theme park in her honor.

When Praiseland first opens, the locals are turned off by its overt wholesomeness (with rollercoaster rides being interrupted by lengthy Bible readings and attendees only able to use their faith to play arcade games) and depart until a souvenir mask of Maude's face floats in front of a statue honoring her. Believing they are witnessing a miracle, the townspeople gather to watch until Principal Skinner collapses near the statue, writhes and experiences a vision of Heaven. The park-goers then immediately decide to experience their own visions of Heaven from the statue with the Simpsons encouraging Ned to donate the extra money from these proceedings to the local orphanage.

Ned explains to his children this is God's will until he notices Homer trying to work the gas grill at a concession stand. He then discovers a gas line near Maude's statue is leaking, causing everyone to inhale the fumes, which explains the visions. He finds out from the utility company that the gas is dangerous and tries to shut the place down, but Homer points out that Praiseland has brought everyone together. The joy is short-lived when Homer spots two orphans lighting candles near the leaking gas, forcing him and Ned to tackle them before an explosion can happen. The townspeople believe Ned and Homer assaulted the children and the former is forced to shut down Praiseland. Rachel, now in a wig to cover the Maude hair, returns to accept a date from Ned. That night, they get rid of Maude's imprint on Ned's bed and make plans for another date.

== Production ==
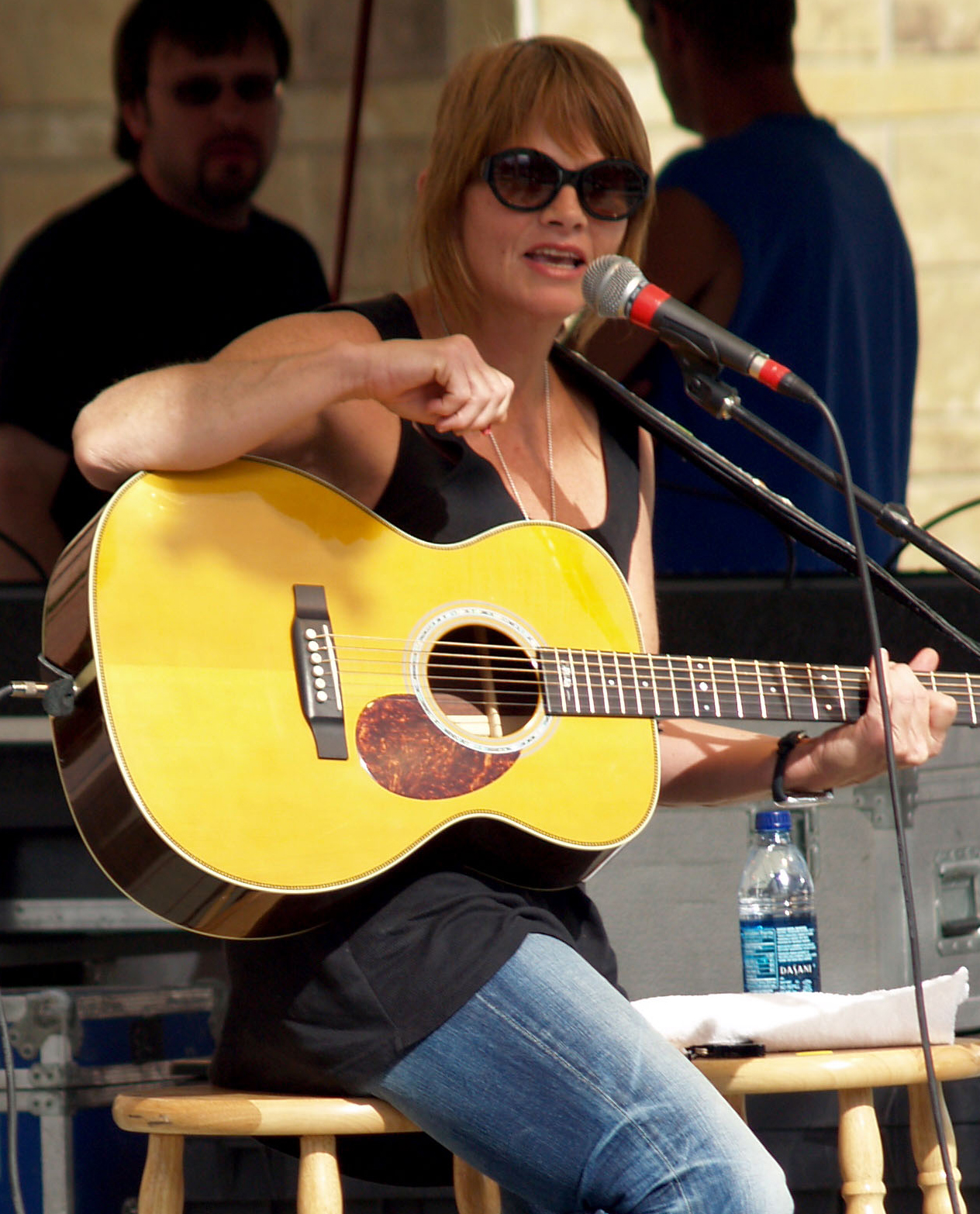
Musician Shawn Colvin reappeared as Rachel Jordan in the episode.

"I'm Goin' to Praiseland" was written by Julie Thacker and directed by Chuck Sheetz as part of the twelfth season of The Simpsons (2000–2001). The idea for Praiseland came from the Christian theme park Heritage USA that was built in Fort Mill, South Carolina in the 1980s. The gas leak that occurs in Praiseland in the episode is based on a real life event that has happened at Disney World. The Bible gum product that is sold at Praiseland was real unbeknown to the writers, and, according to executive producer Mike Scully, they were sued by the owners of the company that produced the real product.

The episode marked the return of the character Rachel Jordan, who had previously appeared in the season eleven episode "Alone Again, Natura-Diddily" (2000). Rachel was guest voiced by American musician Shawn Colvin in both episodes. Colvin has told the Seattle Post-Intelligencer that being raised in Carbondale, Illinois meant she did not have to do much research for the guest appearances: "It's just very isolated [in Carbondale]. There was church music and that was about it. [...] I didn't have to dig too deep for the role. I suppose the whole 'Simpsons' thing is kind of like a hick town."

== Release ==
The episode originally aired on the Fox network in the United States on May 6, 2001. On August 18, 2009, it was released on DVD as part of the box set The Simpsons – The Complete Twelfth Season. Staff members Mike Scully, Al Jean, Ian Maxtone-Graham, Carolyn Omine, Don Payne, Matt Selman, Tom Gammill, and Chuck Sheetz participated in the DVD audio commentary for the episode. Deleted scenes from the episode, including an alternate ending, were featured in the box set as well.

Critics have given "I'm Goin' to Praiseland" generally mixed reviews. DVD Movie Guide's Colin Jacobson commented that "Given its theme, 'Praiseland' comes with a large risk of turning sappy. And it does! From its thin plot to its uninspired gags, the show never manages to get any legs under it. This is forgettable Simpsons." Nancy Basile of About.com wrote in her review that episode "was part touching, part creepy and part hysterical. Homer was his old self: His heart was in the right place, but he screwed up everything. I felt for Ned, but at the same time grimaced when he touched Maude's imprint on the bed. My only real complaint is the very end. The last few episodes [of the twelfth season] have had typical sitcom wrap-up lines."
