= The Simpsons season 12 =

Season of television series

The Simpsons
- Season 12
- DVD cover featuring Comic Book Guy
- Showrunners: Mike Scully; George Meyer (1 episode); Al Jean (1 episode)
- No. of episodes: 21

Release
- Original network: Fox
- Original release: November 1, 2000 – May 20, 2001

Season chronology
- ← Previous; Season 11 Next → Season 13

The twelfth season of the American animated sitcom The Simpsons aired on Fox between November 1, 2000, and May 20, 2001. It began with "Treehouse of Horror XI". The season contains four hold-over episodes from the season 11 (BABF) production line. The showrunner for the twelfth production season was Mike Scully. The season won and was nominated for numerous awards including two Primetime Emmy Awards wins and an Annie Award nomination. Season 12 was released on DVD in Region 1 on August 18, 2009, Region 2 on September 28, 2009, and Region 4 on September 2, 2009.

== Production ==
The season was the last with Mike Scully serving in the role of executive producer, while it was produced by Gracie Films and 20th Century Fox Television. He later returned to the series in season fourteen as a writer and executive producer for the episode "How I Spent My Strummer Vacation". Mike Scully has stated his goal during his tenure was to "not wreck the show".

Don Payne, John Frink and Bob Bendetson began writing for the series, while Larry Doyle, Julie Thacker and Tom Martin left following the completion of this season. Rob LaZebnik received his first sole writing credit for the episode "Homer vs. Dignity". LaZebnik would not get a writing credit for another episode until the 20th season, where he was credited for writing "Father Knows Worst". Shaun Cashman received his sole directing credit on the series this season (for the 250th episode "A Tale of Two Springfields"), while Neil Affleck received his final directorial credit (also for "Homer vs. Dignity"). Tom Gammill and Max Pross have been promoted to produce this season. As of 2009, Gammill & Pross are still credited as such, along with David Mirkin. Mike Reiss (Al Jean's former writing partner) returned to the writing staff as a producer.

The season began with the annual Treehouse of Horror episode, beginning a practice of starting the season with the episodes, as well as airing the episodes shortly after Halloween in November, due to Fox's coverage of the World Series. This season brought back Sideshow Bob, who had not been seen since the eighth-season episode "Brother from Another Series".

Ian Maxtone-Graham's episode "Tennis the Menace" became the third episode of the series to be animated using digital ink and paint, which had not been used since the season seven episode "The Simpsons 138th Episode Spectacular" and would not be tested again until the season 14 opener "Treehouse of Horror XIII", before permanently switching to digital animation a few episodes later with "The Great Louse Detective."

The season would also have five episodes that would air the following season.

== Voice cast & characters ==
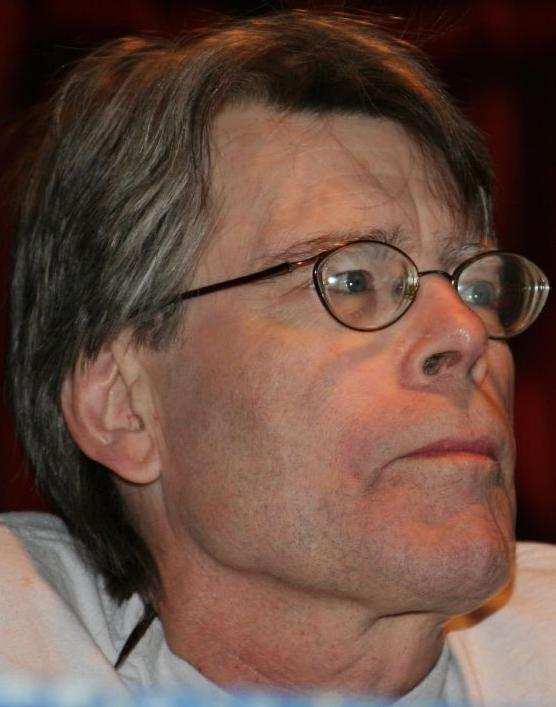
Author Stephen King made a guest appearance as himself in the episode "Insane Clown Poppy"

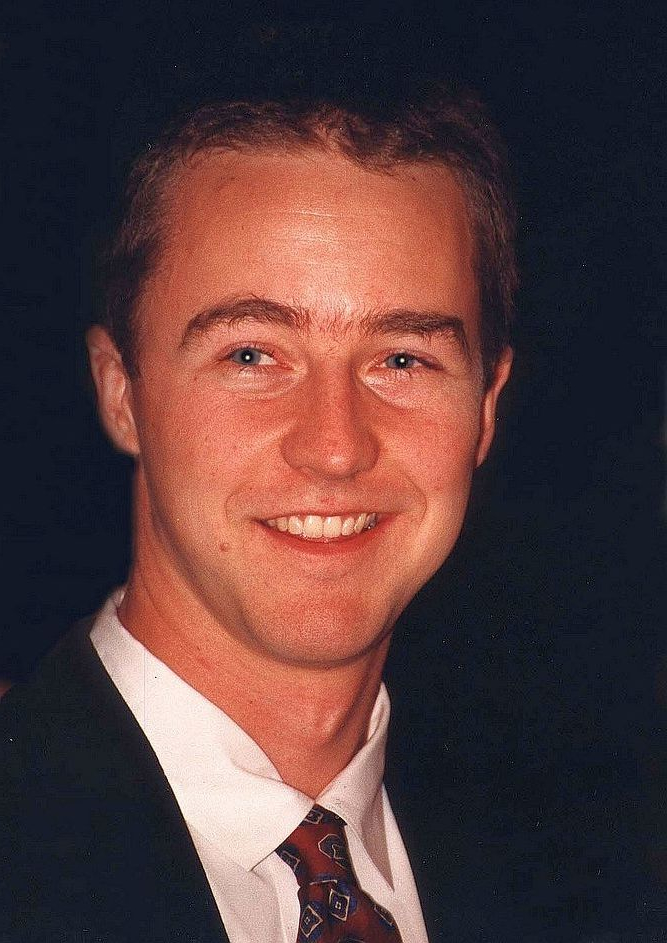
Edward Norton appeared as Devon Bradley in the episode "The Great Money Caper"

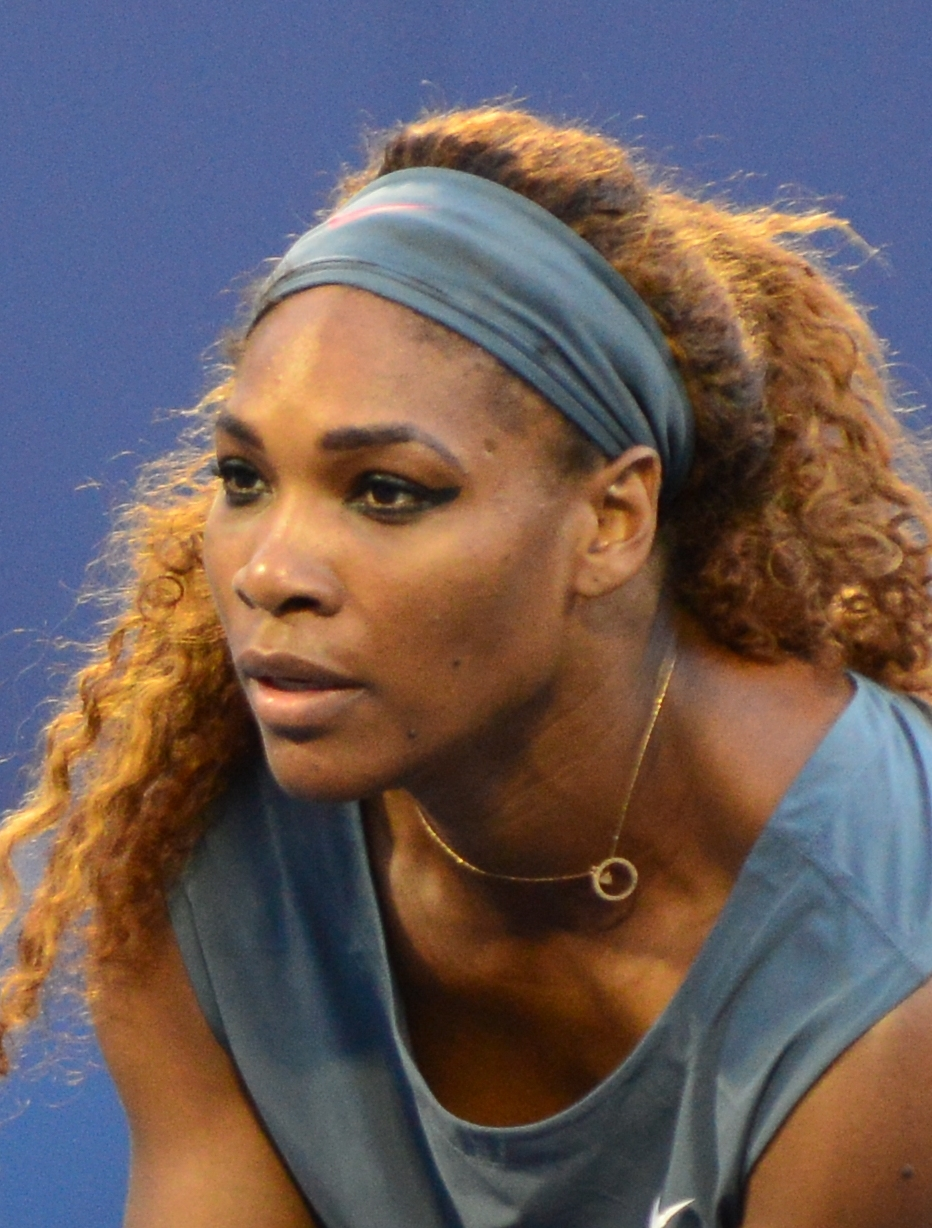
Tennis player Serena Williams made a guest appearance as herself in "Tennis the Menace" along with other tennis players, including her sister Venus

=== Main cast ===
- Dan Castellaneta as Homer Simpson, Mayor Quimby, Groundskeeper Willie, Sideshow Mel, Krusty the Clown, Kodos, Bill, Louie, Frankie the Squealer, Jake the Barber, Rich Texan, Yes Guy, Hans Moleman, Grampa Simpson, Blue-Haired Lawyer, Itchy, Barney Gumble, Gil Gunderson, Coach Lugash, Santa's Little Helper, Arnie Pye and various others
- Julie Kavner as Marge Simpson, Patty Bouvier, Selma Bouvier and various others
- Nancy Cartwright as Bart Simpson, Nelson Muntz, Todd Flanders, Kearney, Ralph Wiggum, Database and various others
- Yeardley Smith as Lisa Simpson
- Hank Azaria as Carl Carlson, Chief Wiggum, Professor Frink, Moe Szyslak, Apu, Comic Book Guy, Captain McCallister, Bumblebee Man, Dr. Nick, Johnny Tightlips, Lou, Mr. Costington, Superintendent Chalmers, Snake, Raphael, Cletus Spuckler, Kirk Van Houten, Duffman, Drederick Tatum, Disco Stu and various others
- Harry Shearer as Lenny Leonard, Dr. Hibbert, Kent Brockman, Kang, Marty, Mr. Burns, Jasper Beardsley, Principal Skinner, Waylon Smithers, Legs, Ned Flanders, Reverend Lovejoy, Judge Snyder, Otto Mann, Scratchy, Eddie, Rainier Wolfcastle and various others

=== Recurring ===
- Pamela Hayden as Jimbo Jones, Milhouse Van Houten, Rod Flanders, Martin Prince, Janey Powell, Patches and various others
- Tress MacNeille as Agnes Skinner, Lindsey Naegle, Dolph, Malibu Stacy, Bernice Hibbert, Violet and various others
- Marcia Mitzman Gaven as Helen Lovejoy, Miss Hoover and various others
- Russi Taylor as Sherri and Terri, Martha Prince, Martin Prince and Wendell Borton
- Karl Wiedergott as additional characters

=== Guest stars ===
- Joe Mantegna as Fat Tony (2 episodes)
- Gary Coleman as himself (2 episodes)
- Marcia Wallace as Edna Krabappel (10 episodes)
- Frank Welker as assorted animal voices (2 episodes)
- Roger Daltrey as himself ("A Tale of Two Springfields")
- John Entwistle as himself ("A Tale of Two Springfields")
- Paul Townshend as his brother Pete Townshend ("A Tale of Two Springfields")
- Drew Barrymore as Sophie ("Insane Clown Poppy")
- Jay Mohr as Christopher Walken ("Insane Clown Poppy")
- Stephen King as himself ("Insane Clown Poppy")
- Amy Tan as herself ("Insane Clown Poppy")
- John Updike as himself ("Insane Clown Poppy")
- Joshua Jackson as Jesse Grass ("Lisa the Tree Hugger")
- Leeza Gibbons as herself ("Homer vs. Dignity")
- Patrick McGoohan as Number Six ("The Computer Wore Menace Shoes")
- Edward Norton as Devon Bradley ("The Great Money Caper")
- Robby Krieger as himself (deleted scene; "The Great Money Caper")
- Michael Keaton as Jack Crowley ("Pokey Mom")
- Charles Napier as the warden ("Pokey Mom")
- Bruce Vilanch as himself ("Pokey Mom")
- Robert Schimmel as a prisoner ("Pokey Mom")
- Tom Savini as himself ("Worst Episode Ever")
- Andre Agassi as himself ("Tennis the Menace")
- Pete Sampras as himself ("Tennis the Menace")
- Venus and Serena Williams as themselves ("Tennis the Menace")
- Kelsey Grammer as Sideshow Bob ("Day of the Jackanapes")
- NSYNC as themselves ("New Kids on the Blecch")
- Natural as the Party Posses ("New Kids on the Blecch")
  - Ben Bledsoe as Ralph
  - Marc Terenzi as Nelson
  - Michael 'J' Horn as Milhouse
  - Michael Johnson as Bart
- Stacy Keach as Howard K. Duff VIII ("Hungry, Hungry Homer")
- Kathy Griffin as Francine ("Bye Bye Nerdie")
- Jan Hooks as Manjula Nahasapeemapetilon ("Bye Bye Needie")
- Frankie Muniz as Thelonious ("Trilogy of Error")
- Shawn Colvin as Rachel Jordan ("I'm Goin' to Praiseland")

== Reception ==
=== Critical reception ===
The twelfth season has received mostly positive reviews from critics. On Rotten Tomatoes, the twelfth season of The Simpsons has an 80% approval rating based on 5 critical reviews. Matt Haigh of Den of Geek said that "The bad episodes are never really terrible, it's more that they're a bit boring and will most likely have you yawning 10 minutes in. With this in mind, season 12 ends up being very much a 50/50 affair". Nancy Basile gave a list of "Must See TV" episodes and "Not So Must See TV" episodes — with more of the former.

=== Awards ===
"HOMR" won the Primetime Emmy Award for Outstanding Animated Program (for Programming Less Than One Hour), the seventh win for the series. Hank Azaria won the Primetime Emmy Award for Outstanding Voice-Over Performance for "Worst Episode Ever". Composer Alf Clausen was nominated for the Primetime Emmy Award for Outstanding Music Composition for a Series for "Simpson Safari". "HOMR" was nominated an Annie Award for Outstanding Writing in an Animated Television Production. Lisa Simpson also won a Board of Directors Ongoing Commitment Award. The show also won at the 2002 Kids' Choice Awards.

=== Nielsen Rating ===
The season ranked 21st in the seasonal ratings with an average of 14.7 million viewers an episode, rising 6% from last season. As of 2023, season 12's Nielsen ranking of #21 remains the highest in the show's history.

== Episodes ==
No. overall	No. in season	Title	Directed by	Written by	Original release date	Prod. code	U.S. viewers (millions)
249	1	"Treehouse of Horror XI"	Matthew Nastuk	Rob LaZebnik	November 1, 2000	BABF21	13.23
249	1	"Treehouse of Horror XI"	Matthew Nastuk	John Frink & Don Payne	November 1, 2000	BABF21	13.23
249	1	"Treehouse of Horror XI"	Matthew Nastuk	Carolyn Omine	November 1, 2000	BABF21	13.23
This year's Halloween story sees The Simpsons as "The Munsters" (with everyone except Lisa getting killed), Homer as a wandering spirit on the hunt for a good deed in "G-G-Ghost D-D-Dad," Bart and Lisa as peasants in a fairy tale forest in "Scary Tales Can Come True," and Lisa inadvertently dooming mankind by rescuing a dolphin in "Night of the Dolphin."
250	2	"A Tale of Two Springfields"	Shaun Cashman	John Swartzwelder	November 5, 2000	BABF20	16.18
While calling Animal Control over a badger taking residence in Santa's Little Helper's doghouse, Homer discovers that Springfield has two different area codes. Homer notices only the poorer half of town was forced to change area codes and has the town split in two with him as the mayor of New Springfield. The towns feud with each other until Homer builds a wall between the town. Isolated, the New Springfield residents move to Old Springfield. Homer forces The Who, scheduled to play in Old Springfield, to play in New Springfield instead. When the residents attack Homer, the Who resolves the issue by suggesting using speed dial, and they play a guitar riff to destroy the wall.
251	3	"Insane Clown Poppy"	Bob Anderson	John Frink & Don Payne	November 12, 2000	BABF17	16.44
Krusty takes parenting lessons from Homer when, during an outdoor book fair, a girl tells Krusty that she is his long-lost daughter from a one-night stand with a female soldier who fought during the Gulf War. Later, Krusty bets Sophie's violin when playing poker with Fat Tony and loses, which betrays Sophie's trust. Homer and Krusty break into Fat Tony's house to retrieve the violin and return it to Sophie.
252	4	"Lisa the Tree Hugger"	Steven Dean Moore	Matt Selman	November 19, 2000	CABF01	14.87
At Krusty Burger to celebrate Bart's new job to pay for video game console, Lisa falls for Jesse, the teenaged leader of a militant environmentalist group that is protesting the restaurant. When the group learns an ancient tree in town is scheduled to be cut down, Lisa volunteers to live in it to impress him. Missing her family, she leaves to visit them, but the tree is struck by lightning and destroyed, and Lisa is presumed dead. When the area is set to become an amusement park in her honor, she reveals herself to everyone. At the same time, Jesse, trying to honor Lisa, causes the fallen tree to slide downhill and destroy part of town.
253	5	"Homer vs. Dignity"	Neil Affleck	Rob LaZebnik	November 26, 2000	CABF04	14.99
When the Simpsons once again have financial problems, Mr. Burns pays Homer to play pranks on others and humiliate himself in public while Smithers is away performing in a Malibu Stacy-themed musical. When Lisa sees what Homer is doing, she convinces him to spend the money to buy toys for kids at Costington's Department Store. Impressed, Costington invites Homer to be Santa Claus at a parade. When Burns tempts Homer with a million dollars to prank the parade watchers, he declines, and Burns performs the prank himself as Santa Claus.
254	6	"The Computer Wore Menace Shoes"	Mark Kirkland	John Swartzwelder	December 3, 2000	CABF02	15.60
Homer decides to buy a computer after turning up at the plant to find that it is closed, and that, not having a computer, he did not receive the e-mail telling the workers. He then creates his own website and it eventually gains attention when he posts gossip. Homer dubs himself as "Mr. X" to conceal his identity. When he reveals that he is Mr. X, he becomes drugged into a mysterious island where people who know too much are imprisoned after Homer starts writing conspiracy theories such as flu shots causing increased holiday spending.
255	7	"The Great Money Caper"	Mike Frank Polcino	Carolyn Omine	December 10, 2000	CABF03	16.84
Homer and Bart become father–son con artists after Bart is given money out of pity when Homer decided to not take him home. However, they are arrested for their scheme by an FBI agent, who is also a con man who steals their money and car. They tell Marge the car was stolen, and their description causes Groundskeeper Willie to be arrested. When the situation escalates, and Willie apparently kills Principal Skinner at his trial, Homer confesses the truth. Marge then reveals that she and the town conned Homer and Bart to teach them a lesson although Willie was not aware of it.
256	8	"Skinner's Sense of Snow"	Lance Kramer	Tim Long	December 17, 2000	CABF06	15.87
A snowstorm traps the students of Springfield Elementary inside. While Principal Skinner tries to maintain control, he becomes partially buried while retrieving Bart from trying to escape, causing the children to run amok. Meanwhile, Ned and Homer drive to rescue the children. They lose control of the car but crash into a cracker factory. The salt inside spills out, causing the snow to melt and freeing Skinner and the children.
257	9	"HOMR"	Mike B. Anderson	Al Jean	January 7, 2001	BABF22	18.52
While working as a human guinea pig (to pay off the family's lost savings after making a bad investment), Homer discovers the root cause of his subnormal intelligence: a crayon that was lodged in his brain ever since he was a boy. He decides to have it removed to increase his IQ, but discovers that being smart does not necessarily equal being happy.
258	10	"Pokey Mom"	Bob Anderson	Tom Martin	January 14, 2001	CABF05	15.01
Marge meets a convict, Jack Crowley at a prison rodeo with remarkable artistic talent. Seeing his potential, he is granted parole into her custody and is hired to paint a mural at Springfield Elementary. Crowley does not like the art Principal Skinner forces him to paint. When the mural in burned, Crowley is suspected. Marge defends him when he declares his innocence but is furious when he is found to be the true culprit and returns to prison. Meanwhile, Homer uses a trash can to fix people's spines after he uses it fix his own. However, chiropractors destroy it when it causes their business to decline.
259	11	"Worst Episode Ever"	Matthew Nastuk	Larry Doyle	February 4, 2001	CABF08	18.50
Bart and Milhouse are banned from The Android Dungeon after stopping Comic Book Guy from buying a box of priceless Star Wars memorabilia for $5, but are hired as his replacements when Comic Book Guy has a heart attack and is advised to leave his job in order to make friends. The boys find secret illegal videos and hold a screening for the children. Meanwhile, Comic Book Guy begins a romance with Agnes Skinner. The police raid the comic book store, and the boys say the videos belong to Comic Book Guy. He is arrested, and Agnes breaks up with him.
260	12	"Tennis the Menace"	Jen Kamerman	Ian Maxtone-Graham	February 11, 2001	CABF07	13.98
While making funeral arrangements for Grampa's future, the funeral planner pitches the idea of a mausoleum that uses the same amount of cement as a full-sized tennis court. This prompts Homer to instead build a tennis court in his backyard, initially mistaking the sport for "Foxy Boxing". The tennis court makes Marge and Homer popular in town, but it turns out that this is only because Homer's inferior tennis ability makes them an easy target. Bart on the other hand, shines as a natural.
261	13	"Day of the Jackanapes"	Michael Marcantel	Al Jean	February 18, 2001	CABF10	15.39
Krusty announces his retirement due to interference from network executives and the growing popularity of the big-money game show "Me Wantee", but when Krusty reveals to Sideshow Bob that all of the episodes featuring him have been erased, Sideshow Bob vows to kill Krusty when he is released from prison. He hypnotizes Krusty's biggest fan, Bart, to murder him during Krusty's farewell show. During the show, Krusty sings about his remorse for mistreating Sideshow Bob, causing him to prevent Bart from kill Krusty. However, the attempted murder scheme causes the police to attempt to execute Bob.
262	14	"New Kids on the Blecch"	Steven Dean Moore	Tim Long	February 25, 2001	CABF12	18.12
A music producer, L.T. Smash, selects Bart, Nelson, Milhouse and Ralph to be members of the next hit boy band. When their song becomes a hit, Lisa discovers a subliminal message in it prompting people to join the Navy. Lisa learns that the producer is a Navy officer, but Homer and Marge dismiss her as being jealous of her brother. When the band becomes less influential after being satirized in Mad Magazine, the program is shut down, prompting Smash to attack Mad headquarters. Smash is arrested for his actions.
263	15	"Hungry, Hungry Homer"	Nancy Kruse	John Swartzwelder	March 4, 2001	CABF09	17.55
Homer becomes a Good Samaritan after discovering the simple joys of helping people in need. When Homer stumbles on the plot to discreetly move the Springfield Isotopes to Albuquerque, New Mexico, he warns the town but is discredited. As a result, he goes on a hunger strike outside the ballpark but is moved inside to become an attraction for fans as his health declines. When fans lose interest, the team owner offers him food, which allows Homer to provide proof of the plot and prevent the team from leaving.
264	16	"Bye Bye Nerdie"	Lauren MacMullan	John Frink & Don Payne	March 11, 2001	CABF11	16.11
When Lisa becomes the target of a female bully, she attempts to learn why she is being targeted. She learns that a pheromone causes bullies to pick on nerds and creates an agent from salad dressing to block it. She demonstrates it, and it works until she runs out of salad dressing. Meanwhile, Homer goes into the baby-proofing business, which unfortunately threatens those of pediatricians and greeting card salesmen. Feeling guilty, Homer encourages baby to hurt themselves to save their businesses.
265	17	"Simpson Safari"	Mark Kirkland	John Swartzwelder	April 1, 2001	CABF13	13.28
When the Simpsons run out of food thanks to a bag boy strike caused by Homer, the family finds an old box of animal crackers with a sweepstakes that sends the Simpsons to Africa. They go on a safari tour, but when Homer enrages a hippo, the family runs until they encounter a chimpanzee sanctuary run by a woman who is fending off poachers. However, they discover that the poachers are Greenpeace activists trying to save the chimps from the woman, who is using them to mine for diamonds.
266	18	"Trilogy of Error"	Mike B. Anderson	Matt Selman	April 29, 2001	CABF14	14.41
In a parody of Go and Run Lola Run, Marge severs Homer's thumb, and they try to get it reattached, but Marge abandons him and an explosion causes Lisa's robot's head to land next to Homer. Lisa tries to get to school with her grammar robot for the school science fair, and when Marge drives her after encountering her, they drive toward Bart emerging from a manhole. Bart and Milhouse help the police find who is smuggling fireworks. When Fat Tony and his henchmen discover them, they chase them through the sewers until the boys emerge near Marge and Lisa. Marge throws the robot at the mobsters, and their vernacular causes the robot to explode. To make a deal, the mobsters offer to reattach Homer's thumb as a presentation for Lisa's science fair project.
267	19	"I'm Goin' to Praiseland"	Chuck Sheetz	Julie Thacker	May 6, 2001	CABF15	13.06
After finding a sketchbook belonging to his late wife Maude, Ned Flanders opens a Bible-themed amusement park to honor her memory. The townsfolk are not interested until a souvenir mask floats to the face of the statue of Maude, and park-goers begin having visions of Heaven. Ned discovers that the phenomenon is caused by a gas leak. He tries to confess it, but Homer said he has brought the town together. However, when two orphans attempt to light a candle near the statue, Ned saves them by tackling them, which the park-goers see as assault. This causes the park to shut down.
268	20	"Children of a Lesser Clod"	Mike Frank Polcino	Al Jean	May 13, 2001	CABF16	13.81
After injuring his knee during a basketball game, Homer begins taking care of the neighborhood kids to cure his boredom during his recovery from surgery. This prompts jealousy from Bart and Lisa, who feel that Homer is giving the kids the attention they never had. When Homer is given an award for this behavior, Bart and Lisa show a video of Homer's worst behavior, causing the parents to take the kids away from him. He apologizes to Bart and Lisa and promises to only care for his own children.
269	21	"Simpsons Tall Tales"	Bob Anderson	John Frink & Don Payne	May 20, 2001	CABF17	13.43
269	21	"Simpsons Tall Tales"	Bob Anderson	Bob Bendetson	May 20, 2001	CABF17	13.43
269	21	"Simpsons Tall Tales"	Bob Anderson	Matt Selman	May 20, 2001	CABF17	13.43
When Homer refuses to pay a five dollar airport tax to fly to Delaware, the family is forced to ride in a livestock car of a train instead. There they meet a singing hobo who tells three tall tales: Homer, as Paul Bunyan, creates a blue ox named Babe and falls in love with a woman named Marge.; Lisa, as Connie Appleseed, a parody of Johnny Appleseed, travels the land planting apple seeds.; Bart, as Tom Sawyer with Nelson as Huckleberry Finn, gets into trouble, and they are executed when they are caught.

== Home media ==
The DVD boxset for season twelve was released by 20th Century Fox Home Entertainment in the United States and Canada on Tuesday, August 18, 2009, eight years after it had completed broadcast on television. As well as every episode from the season, the DVD release feature bonus material including deleted scenes, animatics, and commentaries for every episode. The boxart features Comic Book Guy, and a special limited edition "embossed head case" package was also released.

...The Complete Twelfth Season...
Set Details			Special Features
21 episodes; 4-disc set; 1.33:1 aspect ratio; AUDIO; English 5.1 Dolby Digital; Spanish 2.0 Dolby Surround; French 2.0 Dolby Surround; SUBTITLES; English SDH; Spanish			Optional commentaries for all 21 episodes; Introduction from Matt Groening; Deleted Scenes; Treehouse of Horror XI; A Tale of Two Springfields; Insane Clown Poppy; Lisa the Tree Hugger; The Computer Wore Menace Shoes; The Great Money Caper; Skinner's Sense of Snow; HOMR; Pokey Mom; Worst Episode Ever; Day of the Jackanapes; New Kids on the Blecch; Hungry, Hungry Homer; Bye Bye Nerdie; Trilogy of Error; I'm Goin' to Praiseland; Children of a Lesser Clod; Simpsons Tall Tales; Special Language Feature; Homer vs. Dignity; Portuguese 2.0 Dolby Surround; Hungarian 2.0 Dolby Surround; Ukrainian 2.0 Dolby Surround; Italian 2.0 Dolby Surround; Featurette: "Comic Book Guy: Best. Moments. Ever."; Featurette: "The Global Fanfest"; Sketch gallery; Animation Showcases; Treehouse of Horror XI; Day of the Jackanapes; Illustrated commentaries; Lisa the Tree Hugger; HOMR; I'm Goin' to Praiseland; Commercials; Butterfinger - Butterfingeritis; Butterfinger - Bart's Nightmare; Burger King International - Spaced Homer; Red Rooster - Loungearama
Release Dates
Region 1	Region 2	Region 4	
Tuesday, August 18, 2009	Monday, September 28, 2009	Wednesday, September 2, 2009	
