= Tennis the Menace =

- The Simpsons episode
- Episode no.: Season 12; Episode 12
- Directed by: Jen Kamerman
- Written by: Ian Maxtone-Graham
- Production code: CABF07
- Original air date: February 11, 2001

Guest appearances
- Andre Agassi as himself; Pete Sampras as himself; Venus and Serena Williams as themselves

Episode features
- Chalkboard gag: "I will not publish the principal's credit report"
- Couch gag: The living-room floor is frozen over. The Simpsons ice skate to the couch. When Homer sits down, his side of the couch falls through the ice.
- Commentary: Mike Scully; Al Jean; Ian Maxtone-Graham; Matt Selman; John Frink; Don Payne; Max Pross; Phil Rosenthal

Episode chronology
← Previous "Worst Episode Ever"	Next → "Day of the Jackanapes"
- The Simpsons season 12

"Tennis the Menace" is the twelfth episode of the twelfth season of the American animated television series The Simpsons. It originally aired on the Fox network in the United States on February 11, 2001. In the episode, the Simpsons build a tennis court in their backyard and are ridiculed by the entire town because of Homer's inferior tennis ability. Homer therefore tries to please Marge by entering the two into a tournament, but they quickly turn into rivals when Marge replaces Homer with Bart as her partner.

The episode features guest appearances from tennis professionals Andre Agassi, Pete Sampras, and the Williams sisters as themselves. "Tennis the Menace" was directed by Jen Kamerman and written by Ian Maxtone-Graham, who also directed the Williams sisters' performance. The episodes title is a parody of Dennis the Menace. The animators of The Simpsons experimented with digital ink and paint on "Tennis the Menace", making it the first episode of the series to be animated using the process since season 7's "The Simpsons 138th Episode Spectacular."

"Tennis the Menace" has received generally positive reviews from critics with particular praise for its guest stars.

Around eight million American homes tuned in to watch "Tennis the Menace" during its original airing, and in 2009 it was released on DVD along with the rest of the episodes of the twelfth season.

== Plot ==
The Springfield Retirement Castle holds a talent show, which the Simpson family attends. Grampa wins the show after performing his version of the song "What's New, Pussycat?". He wins a free autopsy, so the Simpsons visit a funeral salesman to claim the prize. While there, Homer decides to buy a casket and a tombstone for Grampa, who is then offered an expensive funeral plan that Homer cannot afford. The salesman tells Homer that the tombstone is produced from the same amount of cement as a tennis court, and this gives him the idea to build a tennis court in the family's backyard (although he initially regrets this, having confused tennis with foxy boxing).

The court is very popular with Springfield's residents, but they mock Homer and Marge for losing all the time, especially thanks to Homer's poor play. Marge pleads with Homer to take the game seriously, but he is too oblivious to how poorly he plays tennis. Instead, he tries to please Marge by entering the pair in Krusty's celebrity tennis tournament, the "Krusty Kharity Klassic". Marge, tired of being laughed at, ditches Homer and enters with Bart as her new partner. Homer is outraged that he was abandoned for a ten-year-old boy, and tries to get revenge by entering the tournament with Lisa as his partner, despite Lisa's disapproval.

The change in partners leads the Simpson family to begin arguing and aggressively competing against one another. The tournament takes place, and in the stands are leading tennis professionals Andre Agassi, Pete Sampras, Venus Williams, and Serena Williams. At the tournament, Homer ditches Lisa for Venus. In response, Marge replaces Bart with Serena as her partner. Ultimately, Serena and Venus replace Marge and Homer with Sampras and Agassi, respectively. This forces the family to go back to the bench and resume their normal places in the family. As they enjoy the exhibition of top-class tennis, they agree that it is better to watch things than to do things, and Homer offers to buy the family dinner with money that he took from Sampras' wallet.

== Production ==
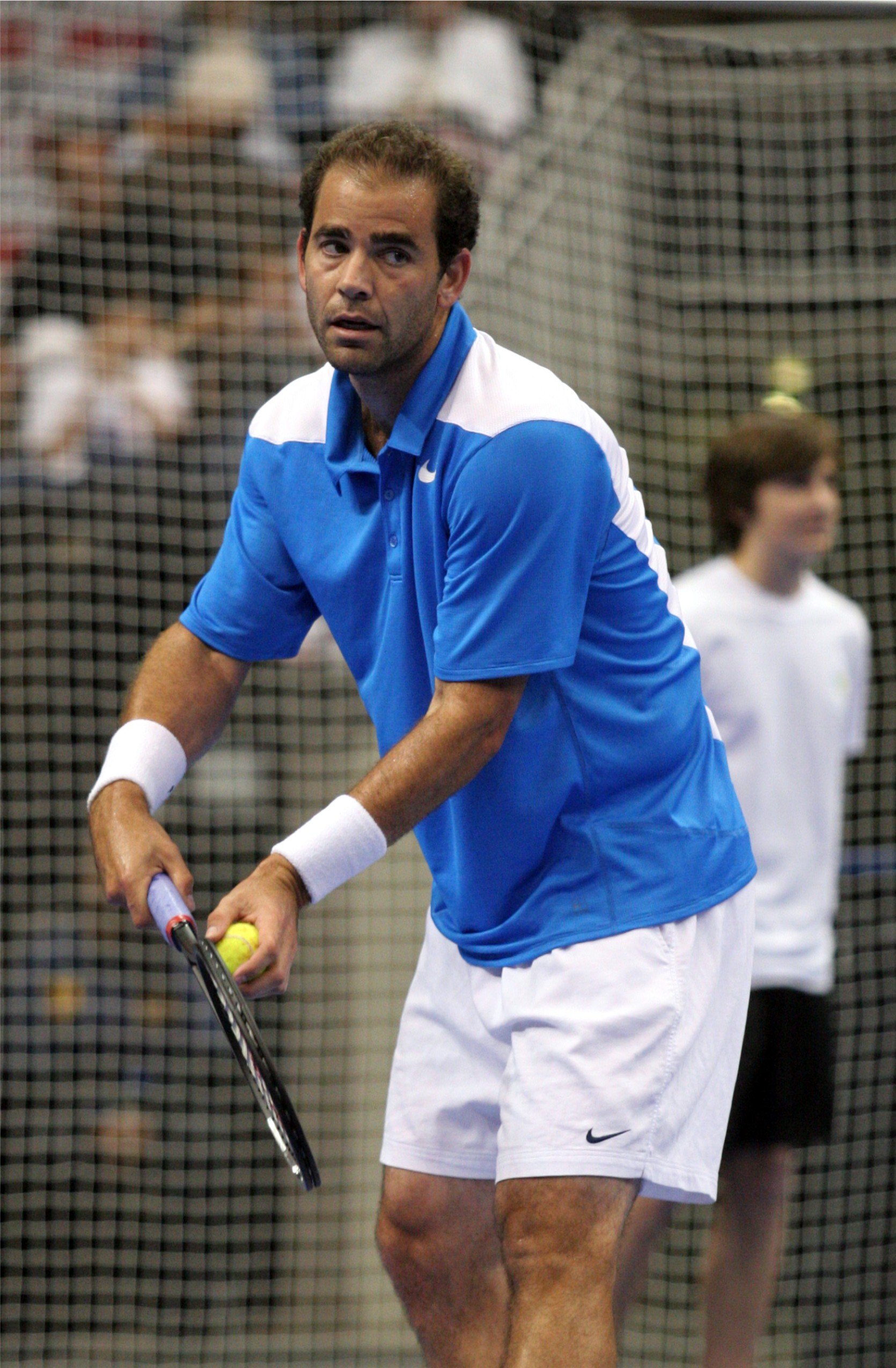
Pete Sampras, who guest starred in the episode, delivered his lines "very naturally" according to Al Jean.

"Tennis the Menace" was written by Ian Maxtone-Graham and directed by Jen Kamerman as part of the twelfth season of The Simpsons (2000–2001). Maxtone-Graham considers himself to be a bad tennis player and he has always wanted to win against his mother in a tennis match. This served as the inspiration for the episode, as he thought "family dynamics around tennis would be a fun show." Maxtone-Graham did a lot a research for the scenes at the beginning of the episode where the Simpsons visit a funeral salesman at a cemetery.

He read Jessica Mitford's book The American Way of Death Revisited, which discusses the funeral industry, and was able to take a tour with funeral salesmen at Westwood Village Memorial Park Cemetery in Los Angeles. At the time, he did not reveal that this was for research, and instead pretended to have a dying relative. According to Maxtone-Graham, the tour helped him find out "all about urns versus coffins, and cremation. I asked sort of questions about, 'Well, do the bodies smell?' They were very nice and gave me all the answers. It was quite fascinating."

The opening of "Tennis the Menace" is what Maxtone-Graham describes as a "screw you" beginning, as the viewer has "no idea that the twist is going to be tennis". The part of the story revolving around tennis does not begin until around eight minutes into the episode. The Simpsons show runner Mike Scully has said that he thought this was "probably too long to wait before getting the story started."

Maxtone-Graham has similarly said that while he thinks these types of openings "are kind of funny", they may be best avoided. However, Scully liked the fact that the staff included a comment in the episode on its "screw you" beginning by having Homer say "I'll bet you didn't see that coming!" to the viewers when he decides to get the tennis court. The writers had a number of alternate endings to "Tennis the Menace" before deciding on the one eventually used. For instance, at one point, the family was to return home to watch the match in which Serena and Sampras faced off against Venus and Agassi on television. The staff changed it to the final one because they did not want it to feel like the episode petered out.

"Tennis the Menace" features guest appearances from Andre Agassi, Pete Sampras, and sisters Venus and Serena Williams. All of them appeared as themselves. Executive producer Al Jean directed Sampras, who Jean thought delivered his lines "very naturally", while Maxtone-Graham directed the Williams sisters. Agassi recorded his lines in the summer of 2000. The Williams sisters, however, recorded their lines in Los Angeles sometime in the winter of 2000–2001. According to Maxtone-Graham, the sisters were "incredibly nice and incredibly generous with their time."

This is the third episode—after season seven's "Radioactive Man" and "The Simpsons 138th Episode Spectacular" (both 1995)—to be animated with digital ink and paint. This kind of digital coloring would not be used permanently on the show until the season fourteen episode "The Great Louse Detective" (2002), although "Treehouse of Horror XIII" was animated digitally as a test run. It was used on "Tennis the Menace" primarily to test the technique. The reason for the gap between this episode and "The Great Louse Detective" was that the staff of The Simpsons wanted to refine the look some more before doing it full-time.

== Release ==
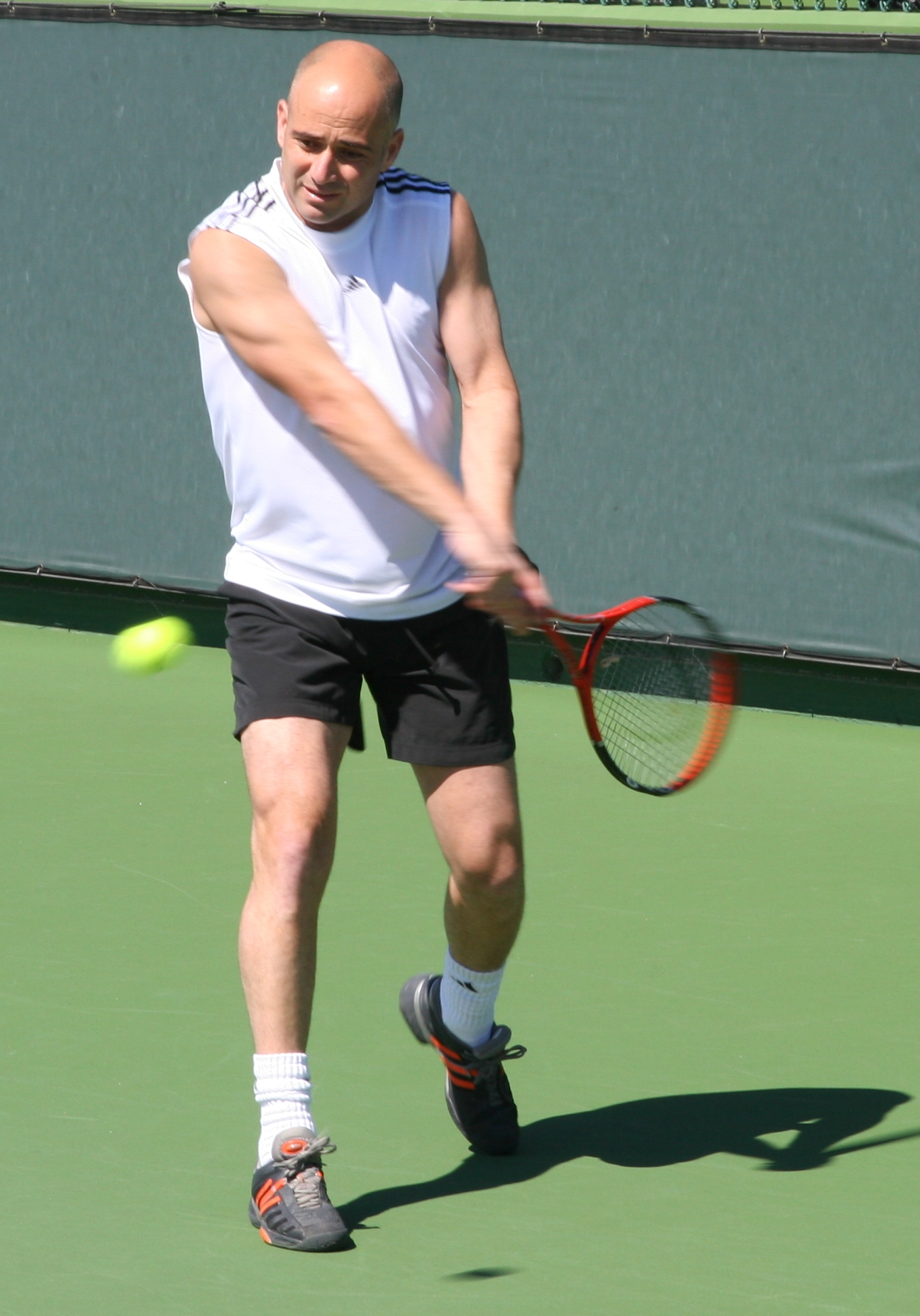
Tennis player Andre Agassi guest starred in the episode and was praised by The Times critic Simon Crerar.

The episode originally aired on the Fox network in the United States on February 11, 2001. It was viewed in approximately eight million households that night. With a Nielsen rating of 8.2, the episode tied the X-Files for the 41st place in the ratings for the week of February 5–11, 2001. The episode was the fourth-highest-rated broadcast on Fox that week, following episodes of Temptation Island, Ally McBeal, and Boston Public.

On August 18, 2009, "Tennis the Menace" was released on DVD as part of the box set The Simpsons – The Complete Twelfth Season. Staff members Mike Scully, Al Jean, Ian Maxtone-Graham, John Frink, Don Payne, Matt Selman, Max Pross, as well as television writer and producer Philip Rosenthal, participated in the DVD audio commentary for the episode.

Critics generally received "Tennis the Menace" quite well.

Jerry Greene of the Orlando Sentinel listed it at number nine on his 2004 list of the show's "Top 10 Sporting Episodes".

Nancy Basile of About.com wrote in her 2003 review that the plot of the episode "allowed us to see more secondary characters than usual. It also gave Springfield a sense of community that we sometimes don't get in recent seasons. Though the blatant use of guest stars has sweeps written all over it, the tennis stars were funny and able to make fun of themselves. Homer had some wonderful lines, too, such as, 'Take your hands off me. They feel like salad tongs.' Overall, a very funny episode."

In July 2007, Simon Crerar of The Times listed Agassi's performance as one of the thirty-three funniest cameos in the history of the show.

In his review of the twelfth season of The Simpsons, Jason Bailey of DVD Talk wrote that the staff members' "habit of using the first act as a red herring, only semi-connected to the rest of the show, is ingenious and hilarious [...] They'd been doing this kind of thing for years, but it still plays; what's more, they've begun to acknowledge it, and wink about it."

He noted the scene from this episode in which Homer tells the viewers that "I'll bet you didn't see that coming!", adding that a "moment like that is The Simpsons at its best: smart, knowing, and ridiculously funny."
