= Trilogy of Error =

- The Simpsons episode
- Promotional Image for the episode
- Episode no.: Season 12; Episode 18
- Directed by: Mike B. Anderson
- Written by: Matt Selman
- Production code: CABF14
- Original air date: April 29, 2001

Guest appearances
- Frankie Muniz as Thelonious; Joe Mantegna as Fat Tony

Episode features
- Chalkboard gag: "Fire is not the cleanser"
- Couch gag: The family skateboards to the couch, jumping off a ramp and doing some aerial stunts before landing, except Homer, who falls off the edge of the ramp and is hit on the head with his own skateboard.
- Commentary: Matt Groening; Mike Scully; Al Jean; Ian Maxtone-Graham; Rob LaZebnik; Matt Selman; Tim Long; Max Pross; David Mirkin; Mike B. Anderson

Episode chronology
← Previous "Simpson Safari"	Next → "I'm Goin' to Praiseland"
- The Simpsons season 12

"Trilogy of Error" (known by the individual titles "Homer's Day", "Lisa's Day", and "Bart's Day") is the eighteenth episode of the twelfth season of the American animated television series The Simpsons, and the 266th episode overall. It originally aired on Fox in the United States on April 29, 2001. In the episode, Homer's rush to the hospital to re-attach his severed thumb, Lisa's rush to school to win the science fair, and Bart's run-in with an illegal fireworks scheme are interconnected as each act tells the events of the same day, but from a different point of view.

"Trilogy of Error" was directed by Mike B. Anderson and written by Matt Selman. The episode, initially titled "Go, Simpson Go", was initially pitched by Selman who figured the whole plot out before pitching it. The episode features a guest appearance from Malcolm in the Middle star Frankie Muniz as Thelonious, while Joe Mantegna reprises his role as recurring character Fat Tony.

The episode has received positive reviews since its original airing. Matt Selman named it the best episode he has ever written.

== Plot ==
The episode takes place over a single day, which starts when Homer, Bart and Lisa are called down to breakfast by Marge only to find a sticky, gooey cereal called mueslix, which they do not want to eat. While Bart excuses himself to answer the door for Milhouse, Lisa helps Homer come up with an excuse to avoid eating breakfast.

=== Homer's day ===
Lisa shows Homer her project for the school science fair, a grammar robot named Linguo, which Homer breaks by pouring beer down his throat after mistakenly thinking the robot expressed a love of beer. Shortly after, Marge accidentally severs Homer's thumb as she is cooking, and Santa's Little Helper runs around with the severed thumb, forcing Homer to chase him for it. Marge calls the police, but when they mistake her for an attempted murderer, she gives them a phony address.

After Homer retrieves the thumb, he and Marge drive to the hospital; along the way they crash into Rainier Wolfcastle's car and then steal it. At the hospital, Dr. Hibbert claims that their finger insurance will not cover the cost as thumbs are not included, so they drive off for Dr. Nick's clinic. Since Homer's thumb is starting to shrivel, he stops at Moe's, where he gets a brine solution. He gets distracted when Moe offers him a beer, and then passes out. When Barney wakes him up with coffee, Homer rushes out and sees Marge is gone. He hitchhikes with Cletus who drives him to Dr. Nick's, but they discover the clinic is on fire. Homer asks Cletus to drive him to Shelbyville Hospital, but his truck gets stolen, leaving Homer to walk to the hospital. His thumb is almost completely shriveled up now, and he is about to throw it in a garbage can when an explosion blasts Linguo's head in the air and it lands next to Homer.

=== Lisa's day ===
Lisa has to fix Linguo after Homer breaks him, missing the school bus as a result. Her bike is stolen and Marge and Homer drive off without her, so she runs around town before getting a ride from Krusty and his driver Mr. Teeny. However, Mr. Teeny mistakenly takes her to West Springfield Elementary School, where after walking into a French class, she has a whirlwind romance with Thelonious, a student who shares her interests. Still needing a ride, Lisa stops at Moe's Tavern looking for her dad, but he is not there.

She spots Chief Wiggum and asks for a ride, but he is too busy tracking down Fat Tony with the help of an undercover informant with a wire. Wiggum botches the mission by announcing himself via the wire, with gunfire heard. Homer comes in just as Lisa leaves by the back door. Outside, Lisa finds Marge, who takes her to school after learning that Homer is drinking at Moe's instead of leaving for help, but the car runs out of gas. Marge and Lisa see Cletus' truck and hitch a ride, but when he exits his truck they steal it and drive off to the school. However, they are forced to stop when Bart emerges from a manhole in front of them.

=== Bart's day ===
With Bart letting him borrow Lisa's bike, Milhouse takes Bart to a cave he has found, which is full of fireworks. The duo test some, but accidentally set fire to Dr. Nick's clinic. Bart and Milhouse hide in a building, but are caught by the police because it actually has the phony address Marge reported. The police ask the boys to help them find the fireworks smuggler in exchange for avoiding juvenile detention.

Bart and Milhouse find Fat Tony and his henchmen and surreptitiously offer to buy his fireworks. However, when Wiggum announces himself via the wire taped to Bart's stomach, Fat Tony realizes that they are undercover. Bart distracts him by lighting firecrackers before running off, so he chases the boys through the sewers until they emerge near Marge and Lisa. Having been chased down the street, Bart and Milhouse get cornered. To save them, Marge throws Linguo at the mobsters who proceed to taunt Linguo. Due to the gangsters' bad grammar, Linguo begins to short circuit and sparks from his body ignite nearby fireworks, causing Linguo to explode and his head to launch like a missile.

=== Epilogue ===
Fat Tony is arrested just as Homer arrives, but when Marge points out his severed thumb and Lisa's destroyed science project, Fat Tony proposes a solution: Lisa brings the mobsters to the science fair, and Legs successfully reattaches Homer's thumb while Lisa narrates the presentation for her class, earning her first place at the science fair. Marge remarks that it has been "one crazy day", causing everyone to laugh, but a fretful Mr. Teeny implores the audience to "tell the people" that the episode's plot made no sense.

== Production ==
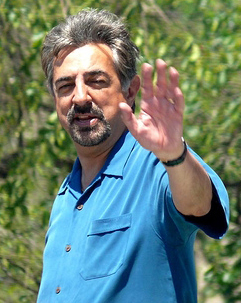
Joe Mantegna guest-stars in the episode as Fat Tony.

"Trilogy of Error" was written by Matt Selman and was directed by Mike B. Anderson as part of the twelfth season of The Simpsons (2000–2001). Selman was inspired by the 1999 comedy thriller film Go. Before pitching it, he devised the whole plot in order to prove that it could be done. The episode was originally called "Go, Simpson Go" in an allusion to the 1998 German crime thriller film Run Lola Run. Due to the non-linear structure of the episode, the writing staff found it difficult to write jokes for the episode, because "every thing would affect the story".

In the original draft, the second act would have portrayed Lisa traveling on the short school bus and meeting children with amusing disabilities, but it was deemed "too radical" at the time. The production team also wanted to create a segment focusing on Marge, but they decided she was already prominent in the first two segments.

During production, the staff found it difficult to choose which jokes to start each act, since all three started the same way. There was also a debate on the appearance of Homer's truncated thumb. The staff decided to add a thumbnail, although characters in The Simpsons do not have nails on their fingers and toes. The cost of "Trilogy of Error" was above average, despite the several replays of the same animation and the expectations of the production staff. During production of the third act of the episode, Selman went on vacation and the staff had to finish the act without him.

The title of the episode is a reference to the 1975 made-for-television horror film Trilogy of Terror. The episode makes a number of allusions to the 1999 film Go, an example of which is Homer and Marge's theft of Rainier Wolfcastle's car after Wolfcastle smashes up their car. The episode also parodies the 1992 film Reservoir Dogs by showing the same events occurring from different points of view, while also featuring music similar to that featured in Run Lola Run during the "Lisa's Day" segment.

The episode originally aired on the Fox network in the United States on April 29, 2001. On August 18, 2009, it was released on DVD as part of the box set The Simpsons – The Complete Twelfth Season. Staff members Matt Groening, Mike Scully, Al Jean, Ian Maxtone-Graham, Rob Lazebnik, Matt Selman, Tim Long, Max Pross, David Mirkin, and Mike B. Anderson participated in the DVD audio commentary for the episode. Deleted scenes from the episode were featured on the box set as well.

== Reception ==
In its original broadcast, "Trilogy of Error" finished with a Nielsen rating of 8.4, equivalent to approximately 14.4 million viewing households. It was the highest-rated show on Fox that week.

Since airing, "Trilogy of Error" has received positive reviews from critics.

In a 2008 Flashback Review, Robert Canning of IGN called the episode "outstanding" for its several sight gags and pop culture references. He concluded it was an amazing episode and that it proved the series could still deliver "[its] share of quality episodes" despite its overall drop in quality. He ultimately gave the episode a 9.0/10. Several members of the IGN staff later named it the best episode of the twelfth season.

AOL named "Trilogy of Error" the 20th best episode of the series. Colin Jacobson of DVD Movie Guide positively compared the episode to the Treehouse of Horror episodes and called the episode a "clever program that consistently entertains".

Screen Rant called it the best episode of the 12th season.
