= Skinner's Sense of Snow =

- The Simpsons episode
- Episode no.: Season 12; Episode 8
- Directed by: Lance Kramer
- Written by: Tim Long
- Production code: CABF06
- Original air date: December 17, 2000

Episode features
- Chalkboard gag: (first) Bart writes "Science class should not end in tragedy"/(second) Principal Skinner writes "I ain't not a dorkus"
- Couch gag: A football is tossed in the center of the living room and the Simpsons dressed as football players dive after it.
- Commentary: Matt Groening; Mike Scully; Ian Maxtone-Graham; Tim Long; Matt Selman; David Mirkin; Max Pross; Lance Kramer

Episode chronology
← Previous "The Great Money Caper"	Next → "HOMR"
- The Simpsons season 12

"Skinner's Sense of Snow" is the eighth episode of the twelfth season of the American animated television series The Simpsons. It first aired on Fox in the United States on December 17, 2000.

"Skinner's Sense of Snow" was written by Tim Long and directed by Lance Kramer. While the episode's premise is based on an occurrence in Long's childhood, the setpiece came from staff writer Matt Selman. Because the episode takes place in winter, Kramer found it difficult to animate. It features references to Smilla's Sense of Snow, The Deer Hunter and Kristi Yamaguchi, among other things.

In its original broadcast, the episode was seen by approximately 8.8 million viewers, finishing in 33rd place in the ratings the week it aired. Following the home video release, the episode received mostly positive reviews from critics.

== Plot ==
While the Simpson family attends a French Canadian circus called "Cirque de Purée", a violent thunderstorm strikes Springfield and forces an early end to the performance. The storm turns into a snow squall overnight, leading to the closure of nearly every local school and business. Springfield Elementary School remains open, but only a few students and faculty members show up since it is the day before Christmas break. To pass the time, Principal Skinner plays a long, low-budget, poor-quality Christmas film for the children. When class is dismissed, the students discover that they are now trapped in the building by the snow blocking the doors and windows.

With the school's telephone service knocked out by the storm, Skinner tries to keep control over the children and begins to ration the available food. After Nelson tries and fails to escape, Skinner looks through his footlocker of memorabilia from his United States Army service and remembers when he was able to command respect from his subordinates. Hanging Nelson by his vest on a coat hook, Skinner threatens to do the same to the other children and briefly frightens them into submission. However, Bart defies Skinner and tries to tunnel his way out; Skinner stops him, but ends up half-buried in snow when the tunnel caves in. The children take Skinner captive and begin to run amok throughout the school.

Meanwhile, Homer and Ned decide to rescue the children, clearing the roads with an improvised snowplow built by attaching a section of Ned's roof to the front end of his car. The car skids out of control and crashes into a fire hydrant, which sprays water that freezes it in place. Homer attempts to break them loose by gunning the engine, with no success, and the car fills with carbon monoxide that causes both men to hallucinate wildly. After enduring so much humiliation and torture from the children, Skinner sends out a call for help by slipping a note inside the exercise ball of the school hamster, Nibbles, and pushing the animal out a window. Nibbles finds his way to Homer and Ned, jolting them back to reality and alerting them to the situation. They break the car free of the frozen hydrant and speed toward the school, but again lose control and crash into a silo filled with salt on the grounds of a cracker factory. The salt spills out and melts the snow around the school, freeing Skinner and the children. Superintendent Chalmers arrives unexpectedly, ready to fire Skinner over the crisis, but is mollified by a remorseful Bart's claim that there is a good explanation for it and does not ask for any details; Skinner thanks Bart for saving his job after the mess they were in. The episode closes with Lisa turning into a camel — the product of a fresh round of Homer's hallucinations — and wishing the viewer a merry Christmas.

== Production ==
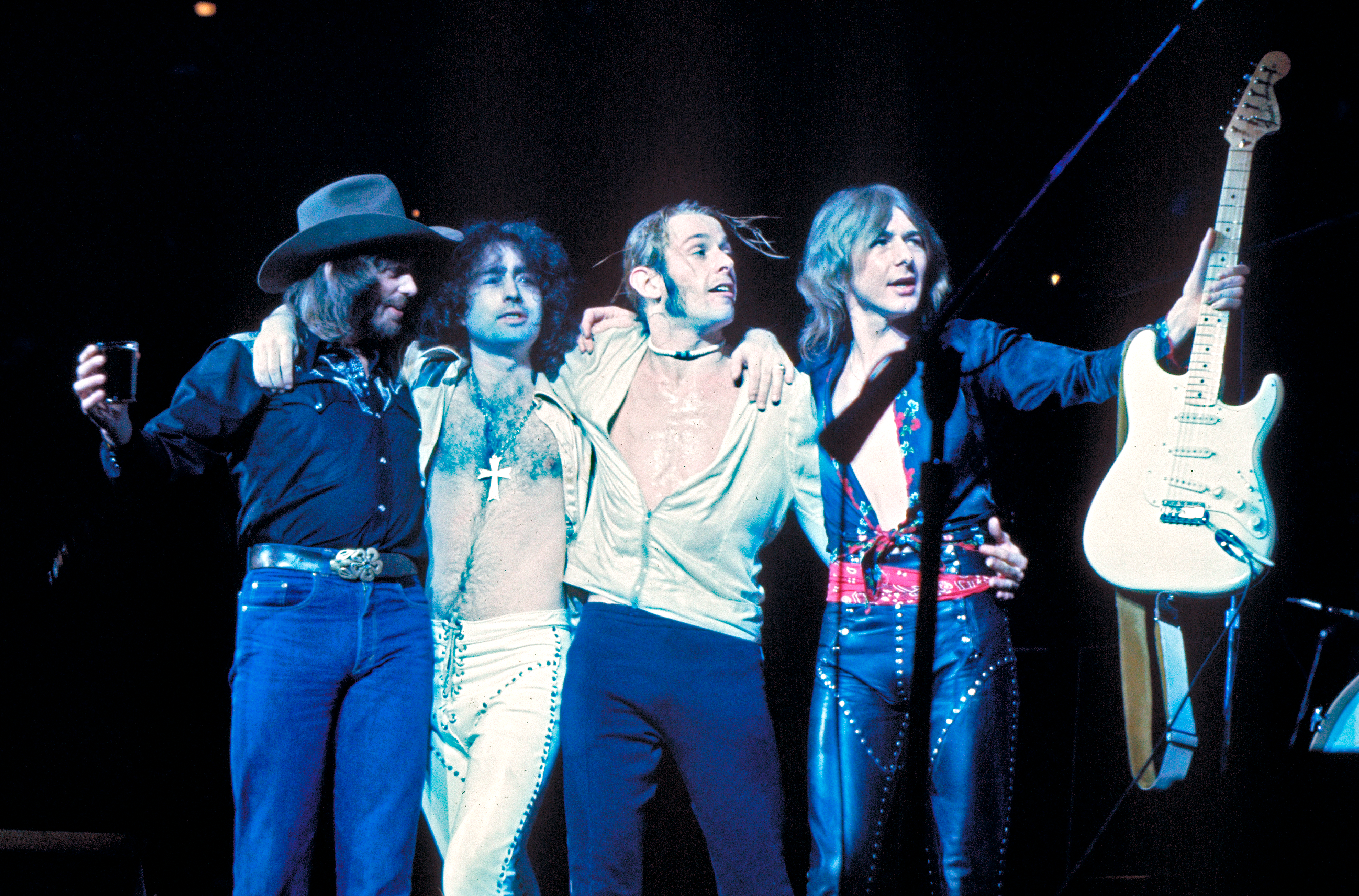
Homer and Ned listen to Bad Company while driving to school

"Skinner's Sense of Snow" was written by Tim Long and directed by Lance Kramer. It was first broadcast on the Fox network in the United States on December 17, 2000. The idea for the episode came from Long. One winter during his childhood, Exeter, Ontario, where Long lived, was hit by a blizzard. Much to his dismay, Long found out that all schools except Exeter Public School, which he went to, got closed (in the U.S., schools are closed entirely at the county or district level, so the real-life situation did not apply here, as it was shown Principal Skinner had the authority to open the school and even to have Otto work his usual bus route). Eventually, Long and his classmates were snowed in with the school's staff. "It was hellish, but then became a sweet thing", he said. "A couple of the dads braved the cold and brought us food on snowmobiles. So it was sweet." Two years after Long pitched the premise, staff writer Matt Selman pitched the episode's setpiece, which revolves around the Simpsons' visit to Cirque du Purée. "I pitched [the setpiece] to Tim [Long] when we were pitching around ideas", Selman said in the episode's DVD commentary. "And I said, 'What about a Cirque du Soleil parody?'" The staff then decided to combine the two stories, and production on "Skinner's Sense of Snow" ensued.

In order to make a faithful rendition of the circus, director Kramer asked the animators to watch a showing of Cirque du Soleil in Santa Monica, but they declined the offer. Regardless, executive producer and former showrunner Mike Scully found that the animators did an "amazing" job animating the setpiece. Because the episode takes place in winter, the animators faced some challenges that they would not have with any other episode. "It just adds another element", Kramer said about episodes taking place in winter, "People's clothes have to get tugged in the wind if it's windy. And you have to make sure the snow is consistent because [...] It's like a character. If it's a big snowflake in one scene and then tiny ones where it's snowing too hard in the next scene... It's not gonna work." The scratches and bad quality of "The Christmas That Almost Wasn't, But Then Was" were added in by the Post-Production Department, led by Alex Duke. "Our Post-Production Department never gets enough credit," Scully said, "But they'll take a film like ['The Christmas That Almost Wasn't, But Then Was'] and make it all scratchy and make it look really old. They always do a great job." The woman in "The Christmas That Almost Wasn't, But Then Was" was portrayed by Tress MacNeille, while the clown in the Cirque du Purée was voiced by Hank Azaria. The song that plays when Homer and Ned are driving to the school is "Feel Like Makin' Love" by English rock band Bad Company, which Homer claims to have written "as a tribute to Princess Di and Dodi". Originally, the series' staff wanted to use "Rock and Roll All Nite" by American rock band Kiss, but they failed to obtain the rights to use it.

== Cultural references ==
Although the episode's title is a reference to the Danish mystery novel Smilla's Sense of Snow, there are no other allusions to the book in the episode. In the episode's set piece, the Simpsons visit a circus called Cirque du Purée, which is a reference to the Canadian entertainment company Cirque du Soleil. The title of film shown in the classroom, The Christmas That Almost Wasn't, But Then Was, is a reference to the 1966 film The Christmas That Almost Wasn't, while the film itself is a parody of B-grade Christmas films from the 1950s and 1960s, such as Santa Claus Conquers the Martians. Within the film, one of the "hobgoblins" has a similar singing voice as American singer Nelson Eddy. Having just found out that they are trapped in the school, Skinner says, "I don't care if you're Kristi Yamaguchi - no one leaves the building". According to Long, the line was written by either Dana Gould or George Meyer, both of whom are former staff writers. While wreaking havoc in the school, Milhouse can be seen doodling mustaches on pictures of Woodrow Wilson and Warren G. Harding, the 28th and 29th Presidents of the United States, respectively. Milhouse was also about to draw a moustache on 27th President William Howard Taft until noticing that he already had a moustache. While ordering Skinner to humiliate himself, Bart says "di di mau"; this is a reference to the 1978 drama film The Deer Hunter, in which the Vietcong say the line to their captives. One of the books that the children burn in the school's library is the 1943 children's novel Johnny Tremain by Esther Forbes.

== Reception ==
In its original American broadcast on December 17, 2000, "Skinner's Sense of Snow" received an 8.7 rating, according to Nielsen Media Research, translating to approximately 8.8 million viewers. The episode finished in 33rd place in the ratings for the week of December 11-17, 2000, tying with an episode of the ABC sitcom The Drew Carey Show.

Since its broadcast, the episode has been released twice on home video. On November 2, 2004, it was released along with "Homer vs. Dignity", "Dude, Where's My Ranch?" and "'Tis the Fifteenth Season" as part of a DVD set entitled The Simpsons - Christmas 2. On August 18, 2009, the episode was again released as part of a DVD set called The Simpsons: The Complete Twelfth Season. Matt Groening, Mike Scully, Ian Maxtone-Graham, Tim Long, Matt Selman, David Mirkin, Max Pross and Lance Kramer participated in the audio commentary for the episode.

Following its home video release, "Skinner's Sense of Snow" received mostly positive reviews from critics.

In his review of The Simpsons: The Complete Twelfth Season, DVD Verdict's Mac McEntire wrote that, while he prefers "down-to-Earth" episodes, the more "outrageous" episodes like "Skinner's Sense of Snow" are the ones that are "standouts". He added that the episode "provides a lot of solid 'cool kids versus dorky adults' comedy", and that the setpiece was the best part of the episode.

Matt Haigh of Den of Geek described the episode as "gold", and considers it to be one of the season's best episodes.

The staff of The Journal, while reviewing The Simpsons - Christmas 2 DVD set, described the episode as "memorable", and John McMurtrie of the San Francisco Chronicle cited it as "great".

Elizabeth Skipper, another reviewer for DVD Verdict, wrote that most episodes that center around Skinner are "a sure thing", and that "Skinner's Sense of Snow" is no exception.

Both Aaron Beierle and Jason Bailey of DVD Talk argued that "Skinner's Sense of Snow" is one of the best episodes of the season.

However, giving the episode a mixed review, Colin Jacobsson of DVD Movie Guide described the episode as "mediocre". Although he found the children's revolt against Skinner amusing, he argued that the premise was not used to its full potential. He concluded his review by calling it "a fairly average program".
