= HOMR =

- The Simpsons episode
- Ozmodiar, a parody of The Great Gazoo from The Flintstones, appears by Homer's side after he inadvertently gets all his friends fired from work. The alien had previously appeared in Season 8's "The Simpsons Spin-Off Showcase".
- Episode no.: Season 12; Episode 9
- Directed by: Mike B. Anderson
- Written by: Al Jean
- Production code: BABF22
- Original air date: January 7, 2001

Episode features
- Chalkboard gag: "Network TV is not dead"
- Couch gag: The Simpsons, except for Bart, are placed on the couch by the pneumatic transport tubes seen on Futurama. Fry (from Futurama with the Simpsons' yellow skin tone) is on the couch for a split second, before the family looks at him in confusion. He is then sucked up into a tube and replaced by Bart.
- Commentary: Mike Scully; Al Jean; Mike B. Anderson; Ian Maxtone-Graham; Matt Selman; Tom Gammill & Max Pross

Episode chronology
← Previous "Skinner's Sense of Snow"	Next → "Pokey Mom"
- The Simpsons season 12

"HOMR" (styled as "HOMЯ") is the ninth episode of the twelfth season of the American animated television series The Simpsons. The 257th episode overall, it originally aired on the Fox network in the United States on January 7, 2001. In the episode, while working as a human guinea pig (to pay off the family's lost savings after making a bad investment), Homer discovers the root cause of his subnormal intelligence: a crayon that was lodged in his brain ever since he was six years old. He decides to have it removed to increase his IQ, but soon learns that being intelligent is not always the same as being happy.

The episode was written by Al Jean and directed by Mike B. Anderson. Its plot takes inspiration from Flowers for Algernon and its film adaptation Charly. "HOMR" was viewed in 10.2 million households, and it received positive reviews from television critics.

In 2001, the episode won an Emmy Award for Outstanding Animated Program, while Al Jean received a nomination in the category "Outstanding Individual Achievement for Writing in an Animated Television Production".

== Plot ==
When the Simpson family visits an animation festival, Homer discovers Animotion, a motion capture technology that enables a real person to control a cartoon character with their own movements. Homer volunteers to demonstrate this technology and likes it so much that he invests his life savings in the Animotion stock. Two days later, he discovers that the stock has plunged and the company behind the technology has gone out of business. At Moe's Tavern, he tells Barney and Moe about his economic troubles, and Barney suggests that Homer become a human guinea pig to earn money.

Homer gets a job at a medical testing center. During one experiment, while commenting on Homer's stupidity, the doctors find a crayon lodged in Homer's brain from a childhood incident when he stuck sixteen crayons up his nose and sneezed all but one of them out. The doctors offer to surgically remove the crayon, and Homer accepts their offer. Homer survives the operation, and his IQ goes up fifty points to 105, allowing him to form a bond with his intelligent daughter Lisa. Homer's newfound brain capacity soon brings him enemies, however, after he performs a thorough report on the Springfield Nuclear Power Plant's many hazards, leading to massive layoffs when the plant is shut down until its many problems can be repaired or resolved.

When Homer visits Moe's Tavern, he sees an effigy of himself being burnt by his friends who worked at the plant. Homer realizes that due to his improved intelligence, he is no longer welcome and that his life was a lot more enjoyable when he was an idiot. He therefore begs the test center doctors to put the crayon back into his brain. The scientists refuse to do it, but recommend Homer to someone who can: Moe, who is also an unlicensed physician.

At his bar, Moe inserts a crayon into Homer's brain, returning him to the idiot he was before. Lisa is initially saddened that she and her father have lost the new connection they shared. However, she finds a note written by Homer before the operation that reads: "Lisa, I’m taking the coward’s way out. But before I do, I just want you to know being smart made me appreciate how amazing you really are." After reading the note, she gets emotional and hugs her father.

== Production ==
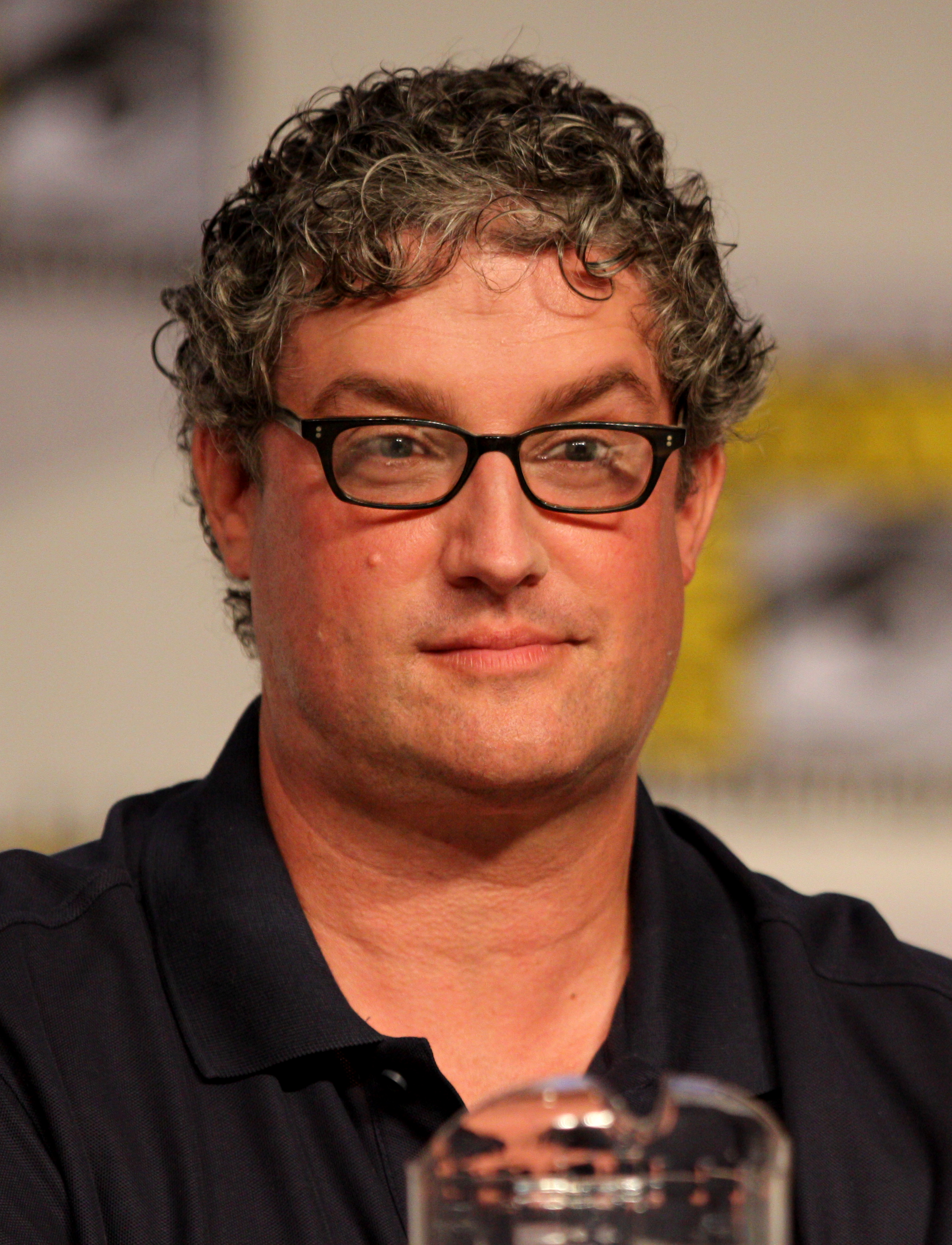
Al Jean wrote the episode.

The episode was written by Al Jean and directed by Mike B. Anderson as part of the twelfth season of The Simpsons (2000–2001). The episode is inspired by Flowers for Algernon, the award-winning science fiction work by Daniel Keyes, where an intellectually disabled man also has his intelligence enhanced with an experiment. In particular, the title "HOMR" is a take on the novel's 1968 film adaptation Charly.

== Reception ==
The episode originally aired on the Fox network in the United States on January 7, 2001. It was viewed in approximately 10.2 million households that night. With a Nielsen rating of 10.0, the episode finished 19th in the ratings for the week of January 1–7, 2001 (tying a 2001 Sugar Bowl pre-game show on ABC). It was the highest-rated broadcast on Fox that week.

On August 18, 2009, "HOMR" was released on DVD as part of the box set The Simpsons – The Complete Twelfth Season. Staff members Mike B. Anderson, Al Jean, Mike Scully, Ian Maxtone-Graham, Matt Selman, Tom Gammill, and Max Pross participated in the DVD audio commentary for the episode. Deleted scenes from the episode were also featured on the box set.

"HOMR" received generally positive reviews from critics.

In 2009, IGN's Cindy White called it a classic and in 2003, The Florida Times-Union writer Soyia Ellison named it one of the ten best The Simpsons episodes.

In 2007, the staff of AOL Television listed it at number eighteen on a list of the top twenty best episodes of the series.

Nancy Basile of About.com enjoyed the episode, commenting in 2005 that the storyline was "solid and didn't go off track" and that the jokes "were clever, just like the old days." She added that she "was surprised to find Homer even funnier as a genius", and praised the many references to popular culture included in the episode, "such as Japanimation, smoking, pipe bombs and planned parenthood, ebay and more that I can't remember." Basile was, however, disappointed that the writers put Moe in the role of the unlicensed physician when they had an opportunity to use the character Dr. Nick.

Jason Bailey of DVD Talk wrote in 2009, that he thought Homer got "hilariously smart" in "HOMR".

DVD Movie Guide's Colin Jacobson was less positive, writing in a 2009 review that one should not "expect a lot of thrills" from the episode as he thought it had "a moderately rehashed feel". He noted that "brainy Homer sure does remind me a lot of loquacious Homer from Season Three’s 'Bart's Friend Falls in Love'."

At the 53rd Annual Primetime Emmy Awards, "HOMR" won the award for "Outstanding Animated Program (for Programming Less Than One Hour)".

At the 29th Annie Awards, Jean received a nomination in the category "Outstanding Individual Achievement for Writing in an Animated Television Production" for his work on "HOMR". However, he lost to Ron Weiner—the writer of the Futurama episode "The Luck of the Fryrish".
