= Homer vs. Dignity =

- The Simpsons episode
- Episode no.: Season 12; Episode 5
- Directed by: Neil Affleck
- Written by: Rob LaZebnik
- Production code: CABF04
- Original air date: November 26, 2000

Guest appearance
- Leeza Gibbons as herself

Episode features
- Chalkboard gag: "I was not the Sixth Beatle"
- Couch gag: Marge, Bart, Lisa and Maggie successfully do skateboard tricks off a ramp and onto the couch but Homer falls off the ramp and is hit on the head by his skateboard.
- Commentary: Matt Groening; Mike Scully; Ian Maxtone-Graham; Rob LaZebnik; Carolyn Omine; Matt Selman; Don Payne; Max Pross

Episode chronology
← Previous "Lisa the Tree Hugger"	Next → "The Computer Wore Menace Shoes"
- The Simpsons season 12

"Homer vs. Dignity" is the fifth episode of the twelfth season of the American animated television series The Simpsons. It first aired on the Fox network in the United States on November 26, 2000. In the episode, Mr. Burns hires a cash-strapped Homer as his "prank monkey", paying him to play pranks on others and humiliate himself in public.

The episode was written by Rob LaZebnik in his last writing credit for over eight years, until season 20's "Father Knows Worst". The episode features cultural references to The Magic Christian and The Birds.

The episode was panned by critics and fans who took issue with its humor and writing. An infamous scene where Homer gets implicitly raped by a panda was widely criticized as an instance where the series jumped the shark. It is considered to be one of the worst episodes of the entire series.

== Plot ==
The Simpsons go out to dinner to celebrate Bart getting his first test "A" grade; however, Homer's credit card is rejected due to insufficient funds, and the family are made to sing for customers to work off their bill. After Homer reveals that he sold the back seats of his car for gasoline money, he and Marge seek advice from financial planner Lindsay Naegle. Naegle explains to them that, due to poor money management on Homer's part, the family have multiple mortgages and will need to declare bankruptcy several times.

Meanwhile, Mr. Burns is looking to amuse himself while his assistant, Smithers, is in New Mexico performing in a Malibu Stacy musical that he wrote. When Homer asks if he can have a raise, Burns offers him cash in exchange for throwing pudding at Lenny. He agrees to it, and a highly amused Burns decides to makes Homer his personal "prank monkey". Burns pays Homer to perform embarrassing and cruel tasks, such as pretending to be a baby who "made a boom boom" at the sports stadium restroom, eating a mint condition The Amazing Spider-Man #1 in front of Comic Book Guy, and later masquerading as the Springfield Zoo's new female panda, Sim-Sim. However, the panda prank goes awry when Homer is electrocuted by animal handlers and sexually assaulted by the zoo's male panda, Ping-Ping.

Lisa discovers what Homer has been doing and convinces him his dignity is more important than money. After he quits the "prank monkey" job, she suggests using the leftover money to help needy children, so he buys and then donates the entire selection of kid's toys at Mr. Costington's department store. Costington, impressed by Homer's generosity, invites him to play Santa Claus in the store's Thanksgiving Day parade, which Burns sees as an opportunity for one more prank. During the parade, Burns offers Homer one million dollars to throw buckets of fish guts into the crowd, but Homer refuses and instead leaves the float to reunite with his family; Burns assumes the role of Santa and carries out the prank himself, causing the audience to be attacked by seagulls. As the Simpsons watch the chaos from the sidelines, Homer thanks Lisa for helping him regain his dignity.

== Production ==
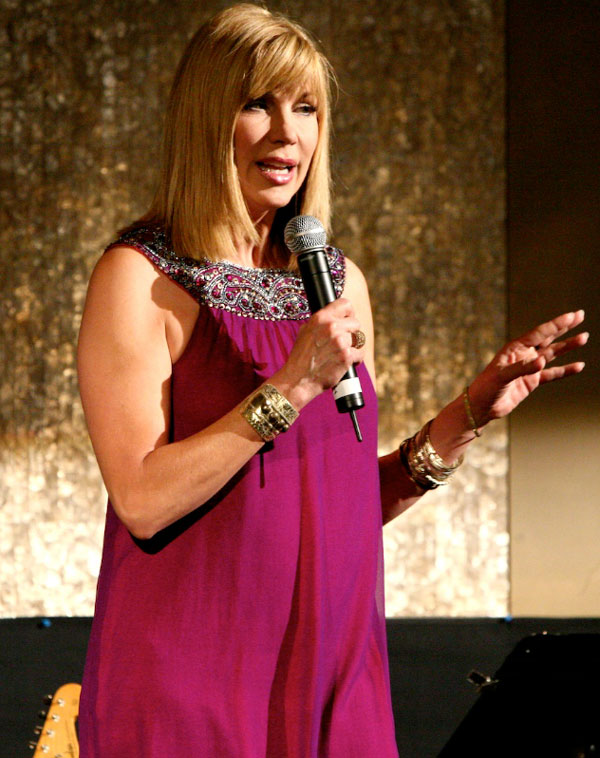
Leeza Gibbons guest starred as herself.

The episode was written by Rob LaZebnik and directed by Neil Affleck, the last episode that he directed. It is LaZebnik's first full written script with the first script being "G-G-Ghost D-D-Dad" from "Treehouse of Horror XI" and draws its plot from the British film The Magic Christian, itself an adaptation of Terry Southern's novel of the same name. There was originally a sub-plot with Smithers' musical. LaZebnik brought some friends and his wife to the table read and during the third act was repeatedly ended and went badly making Larry Doyle laugh hysterically. There was another prank where Mr. Burns put a lottery ticket into a grave and everybody went digging for the lottery ticket. The episode includes a character named Rusty the Clown, a reference to Rusty Nails, the inspiration for Krusty the Clown.

There was originally going to be a running gag where Lenny keeps getting hit with random objects. There were many endings to the original script. One ending was Homer throwing pig's blood into the crowd and 50 years later showing Homer telling a group of children that this was the reason why Thanksgiving was renamed Bloodsfest. They were also going to be hit by blood and laugh. There was also another ending with gravy, but then changed to fish guts. The full version of the song "Sold Separately" was later released on The Simpsons' soundtrack album, The Simpsons: Testify. "Homer vs. Dignity" was included on The Simpsons Christmas 2 DVD along with "Dude, Where's My Ranch?", "Skinner's Sense of Snow", and "'Tis the Fifteenth Season".

== Reception ==
The episode was panned by critics. Cindy White of IGN said that while the episode is universally panned, mostly due to the scene where Homer is implicitly raped by a panda at the zoo, and the intentional recycling of other Simpsons episode premises (such as the Simpsons having financial trouble, Mr. Burns hiring Homer to be his assistant while Smithers is on vacation, someone dressing up as a baby, Homer dressing up as Santa Claus, and Lisa worrying over someone selling their soul), it has funny throwaway jokes and sight gags to make up for it.

In September 2009, Colin Jacobson of DVD Movie Guide gave the episode a negative review, saying "Bad sign number one: when a series plagiarizes itself. That occurs here when Mr. Burns states 'There’s a new Mexico?', a line that was a lot funnier...back in season five. Bad sign number two: a scene in which Homer gets raped by a panda. A couple of the pranks provide minor amusement, but overall, this is a weak episode." Judge Mac McEntire of DVD Verdict said the episode's best moment was with Homer and the panda. Mike Scully believes that the episode's negative reception was due to critics and audiences being unfamiliar with The Magic Christian.

In January 2012, Johnny Dee of The Guardian wrote that many fans regard the panda rape scene as "a low in the show's history" and suggested the phrase "raped by a panda" should replace "jumped the shark" to imply that a popular series has declined in quality and is beyond recovery.

The episode is listed on Collider as one of the "10 Worst Simpsons Episodes, Ranked". Kotaku also named the episode on its list of "The 10 Worst Simpsons Episodes".
