= The Computer Wore Menace Shoes =

- The Simpsons episode
- Episode no.: Season 12; Episode 6
- Directed by: Mark Kirkland
- Written by: John Swartzwelder
- Production code: CABF02
- Original air date: December 3, 2000

Guest appearance
- Patrick McGoohan as Number Six

Episode features
- Chalkboard gag: "I will only provide a urine sample when asked"
- Couch gag: Santa's Little Helper dances on his hind legs like Snoopy.
- Commentary: Mike Scully; Ian Maxtone-Graham; Don Payne; John Frink; Matt Selman; Tom Gammill; Max Pross; Mark Kirkland; Joel H. Cohen

Episode chronology
← Previous "Homer vs. Dignity"	Next → "The Great Money Caper"
- The Simpsons season 12

"The Computer Wore Menace Shoes" is the sixth episode of the twelfth season of the American animated television series The Simpsons. It first aired on the Fox network in the United States on December 3, 2000. In the episode, Homer buys a computer and creates his own website to spread gossip and fake news. However, when Homer starts writing conspiracy theories about flu shots, he is sent to an island where people who know too much are imprisoned.

"The Computer Wore Menace Shoes" was written by John Swartzwelder and directed by Mark Kirkland. The title of the episode is a reference to the 1969 Disney comedy film The Computer Wore Tennis Shoes, but the episode isn't related to the film in any other way. The episode's third act features many references to the 1967 science fiction series The Prisoner.

The episode features Patrick McGoohan as Number Six, the main character from The Prisoner. In its original broadcast, the episode was seen by approximately 9.1 million viewers, finishing in 28th place in the ratings the week it aired. Following its broadcast, the episode received mixed reviews from critics; commentators were divided over the episode's third act.

== Plot ==
After finding out that all of the nuclear power plant's staff members had been informed of the plant's closure for maintenance via e-mail, Homer decides to buy a computer. After Lisa sets up the computer for him, Homer starts his own webpage, which contains copyrighted material from other pages. To avoid getting sued, Homer calls himself "Mr. X". Late at night, unable to sleep until someone visits his page, Homer hears a rumor from Bart started by either Nelson Muntz or Jimbo Jones that Mayor Quimby spent the street repair fund on a secret swimming pool. He posts this rumor on his page, which is seen by several of Springfield's citizens, and reporters find a luxurious pool along with many scantily dressed women in Quimby's office building.

Homer keeps anonymously investigating and posting more scandals, including Mr. Burns selling uranium to terrorists (resulting in Burns getting arrested by the FBI), Apu selling expired doughnuts as bagels, and various unprofessional acts by the Springfield Police Department (although he overlooks Krusty's admission to vehicular manslaughter). Eventually, Mr. X wins the Pulitzer Prize for his journalistic achievements, despite no-one knowing who he is. When he hears that the prize money will be given to starving children, Homer reveals himself as Mr. X. However, this ends up alienating Homer from the rest of the town, as no-one feels comfortable confessing their secrets now that they know he is Mr. X, and his fame soon plummets. To boost his popularity, Homer begins posting outrageous fake stories on his webpage. Regaining his fame, Homer celebrates by going to a Kwik-E-Mart which turns out to be fake, and he ends up being kidnapped.

Homer wakes up on the "Island", a place where the inhabitants are people who have been exiled from society for harboring dangerous secrets. Homer learns from the organization's leader, Number Two, that a story he wrote about flu vaccinations containing a mind-control serum is true; the mind control drug is calibrated to drive people into a frenzy of shopping, which is why flu shots are administered shortly before Christmas. While Homer is trapped on the Island, he is replaced by a doppelgänger who looks identical to him but speaks with a thick German accent and wears a dark tie.

Number Six, who is trapped on the Island for inventing the bottomless peanut bag, tells Homer about a makeshift boat he spent thirty-three years making, which Homer steals and escapes the Island with. When he gets home, Homer tries to contact the police through his computer, only for the computer to be hacked remotely by Number Two. Homer is attacked by his doppelgänger but then defeats him by kicking him in the crotch. Marge and the kids are happy that the real Homer has returned, but then a fake Santa's Little Helper spouts a gas that drugs the entire family. The episode ends with everyone in the family enjoying their strange, new life on the Island. A fake koala shoots gas towards the viewer while Homer and Lisa invite them to the Island.

== Production ==
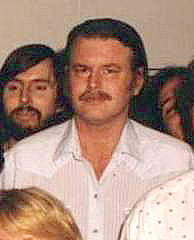
Being a Matt Drudge fan, John Swartzwelder (pictured) originally wanted "The Computer Wore Menace Shoes" to be called "Homer the Drudge".

"The Computer Wore Menace Shoes" was written by John Swartzwelder and directed by Mark Kirkland. It was first broadcast on the Fox network in the United States on December 3, 2000. Originally, the episode was about Homer becoming Matt Drudge, the creator and an editor of the news aggregation website the Drudge Report, of which Swartzwelder is a fan. At that point, the episode was called "Homer the Drudge". The chalkboard gag was written by staff writer Don Payne, and the couch gag was conceived by producer Laurie Biernackie.

The third act of "The Computer Wore Menace Shoes" is a pastiche of the 1967 science fiction television series The Prisoner. In order to "get the feel" of The Prisoner, the writers watched its opening sequence, which summarizes the story of the series. Kirkland, who had seen a couple of episodes as a child, watched several episodes of the series with The Simpsons' animators in order to make "The Computer Wore Menace Shoes" resemble it. They were also influenced by 1960s modernism and furniture designs from the 1971 science fiction film A Clockwork Orange.

The episode features American-born actor Patrick McGoohan as Number Six, the central character in The Prisoner, which McGoohan played. "The Computer Wore Menace Shoes" was the only time McGoohan reprised his role as Number Six. In the DVD commentary for the episode, Payne said that McGoohan was "very funny", and that all the writers wanted to meet him when he came to record his dialogue for the episode.

McGoohan was reportedly very pleased with his role in the episode; when his wife Joan McGoohan, who is a real estate broker, helped staff writer Max Pross buy a house, she told him that Patrick McGoohan was as proud of the episode as anything in his career.

== Cultural references ==
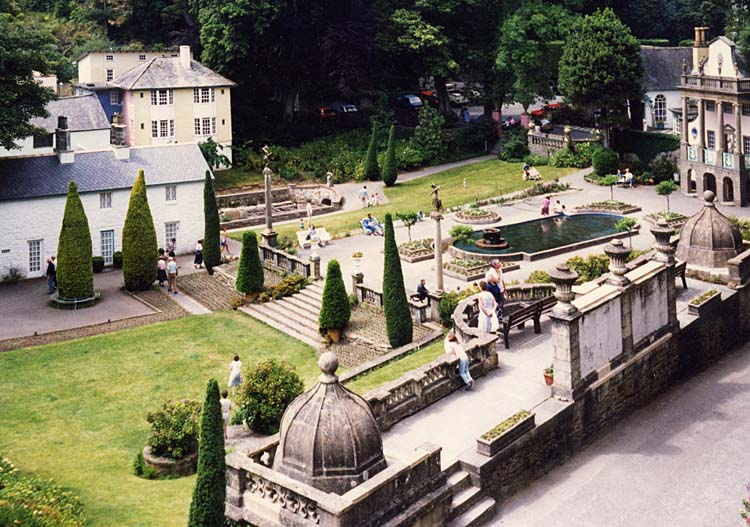
Homer is taken to "The Island", a parody of "The Village" in The Prisoner.

"The Computer Wore Menace Shoes" makes fun of use of the Internet, which was rapidly growing in popularity at the time. "[...] The Internet was just starting to turn into a serious waste of time around this point in history", staff writer Matt Selman said in the episode's DVD commentary. The news website that Homer creates is based on the Drudge Report, a news aggregator created by journalist Matt Drudge. The episode was also written at a time when several The Simpsons producers invested in an animated web series' company called icebox.com, which was co-created by two former The Simpsons writers.

Although the title of the episode is a reference to the 1969 Disney film The Computer Wore Tennis Shoes, the episode itself has "essentially nothing" to do with the film, according to M. Keith Booker in his book Drawn to Television: Prime-Time Animation from The Flintstones to Family Guy. In the episode, the slogan of Homer's webpage is "All the muck that's fit to rake". This is a reference to the American newspaper The New York Times, whose slogan is "All the News That's Fit to Print". The word "muck" refers to muckrakers, a term closely associated with reform-oriented journalists who wrote largely for popular magazines after 1900.

The episode's third act, which serves as a parody of The Prisoner, features several references to the series. When the secret organization finds out about Homer's discovery, he is taken to a secret location called the "Island". The "Island" is modeled after the "Village", where Number Six is taken in The Prisoner.

While he is in the "Island", Homer is repeatedly gassed by unexpected objects, a reference to the way Number Six would often be gassed in The Prisoner. "George [Meyer] and I used to laugh a lot about how often [Number Six] would be gassed by unexpected devices in the show", Scully said in the episode's DVD commentary. "And we wanted to cram as many in as we could." While escaping the "Island", Homer is chased by a "big balloon". The balloon is a reference to Rover, a floating white ball in The Prisoner that was created to keep inhabitants in the "Village", which was also featured in the season 9 episode "The Joy of Sect". The music heard in the scene is based on The Prisoner's theme music.

== Release and reception ==
In its original American broadcast on December 3, 2000, "The Computer Wore Menace Shoes" received a 9.0 rating, according to Nielsen Media Research, translating to approximately 9.1 million viewers. The episode finished in 28th place in the ratings for the week of November 27-December 3, 2000, tying with an episode of the news magazine Dateline NBC and the CBS sitcom The King of Queens. After the episode was released, The Simpsons' writers created a website called mrxswebpage.com, which was made to resemble Homer's website in the episode.

This was at a time when many television shows created websites to promote episodes; earlier that year, Fox created a website called whatbadgerseat.com in conjunction with the season premiere, in which badgers played an important role. On August 18, 2009, the episode was released as part of a DVD set called The Simpsons: The Complete Twelfth Season. Mike Scully, Ian Maxtone-Graham, Don Payne, John Frink, Matt Selman, Tom Gammill, Max Pross, Mark Kirkland and Joel H. Cohen participated in the audio commentary for the episode.

Following its broadcast, "The Computer Wore Menace Shoes" received mixed reviews from critics. Giving it a positive review, DVD Talk's Jason Bailey described the episode as a "smart piece of social satire". He especially enjoyed Homer's part in the episode, and found that his incompetence at handling computers is "comedic gold". Casey Burchby, another reviewer for DVD Talk, also enjoyed the social satire in the episode, and although he found the parody of The Prisoner "bizarre", he maintained that it was "bold".

Writing for DVD Verdict, Mac MacEntire argued that the episode is "hilarious", provided one has seen The Prisoner. DNA Smith described the episode as "memorable". The episode is also often considered to be a fan favorite, according to Matt Haigh of Den of Geek. On the other hand, DVD Movie Guide's Colin Jacobson was less impressed with the episode.

In his review of The Simpsons: The Complete Twelfth Season, Jacobson wrote that he enjoyed the episode's take on "Internet idiocy". He wrote, "Some parts of it feel dated, but the web features even more ill-informed opinions today than it did nine years ago, so much of it remains timeless and on target." However, he was critical of the episode's third act. "The side of the show feels like it was intended to amuse a few fans and it doesn’t show a lot of real cleverness or wit", he wrote. He summarized the episode as being decent, but inconsistent.
