= Bye Bye Nerdie =

- The Simpsons episode
- Episode no.: Season 12; Episode 16
- Directed by: Lauren MacMullan
- Written by: John Frink; Don Payne
- Production code: CABF11
- Original air date: March 11, 2001

Guest appearances
- Kathy Griffin as Francine; Jan Hooks as Manjula Nahasapeemapetilon

Episode features
- Chalkboard gag: "I will not scare the vice president"
- Couch gag: The family enters the living room in bumper cars. Marge and Maggie bump Homer, then Bart and Lisa slam Homer repeatedly against the wall.
- Commentary: Mike Scully; Ian Maxtone-Graham; Don Payne; Matt Selman; Tim Long; Tom Gammill; Yeardley Smith; Lauren MacMullan; Steven Dean Moore

Episode chronology
← Previous "Hungry, Hungry Homer"	Next → "Simpson Safari"
- The Simpsons season 12

"Bye Bye Nerdie" is the sixteenth episode of the twelfth season of the American animated television series The Simpsons. It originally aired on the Fox network in the United States on March 11, 2001. In the episode, after Lisa becomes the target of a female bully named Francine, she discovers a scientific reason as to why bullies pick on nerds and demonstrates her findings at a science conference. Meanwhile, Homer goes into the childproofing business, causing baby-injury-related businesses to go in decline.

John Frink and Don Payne wrote "Bye Bye Nerdie" and their original idea for the episode saw Lisa being sent to juvenile hall after accidentally punching Principal Skinner when she was attempting to punch Francine. "Bye Bye Nerdie" was the first The Simpsons episode directed by Lauren MacMullan, who also made the design for Francine. Actress and comedian Kathy Griffin guest starred in the episode as this new bully character.

"Bye Bye Nerdie" has received generally positive reviews from critics and it was listed among "The Top Ten science moments in The Simpsons" by the editorial staff of Nature. Around 8.8 million American homes tuned in to watch the episode during its original airing, and in 2009 it was released on DVD along with the rest of the episodes of the twelfth season.

== Plot ==
On an ordinary day at Springfield Elementary, Lisa attempts to make friends with a new girl, Francine, but Francine, who is much larger and tougher than Lisa, punches Lisa in the face, giving her a severe black eye. Even attempting to share an interest in Malibu Stacy does not work since the doll that Francine has turns out to be Lisa's, which she then ruins. Lisa attempts to hire the school bullies (Nelson and his friends Jimbo, Dolph, and Kearney) to protect her, but they decline since girls fight dirtier than boys and boys tend to be more vulnerable to falling in love. It is up to Lisa to investigate by herself the reason why Francine is targeting her and the nerds.

Meanwhile, Homer starts to fear that Maggie could die from touching things unsafe to her when he hears this from a childproofing saleswoman; and is alarmed when he learns of the cost of childproofing his house. As a result, he starts his own childproofing crusade, selling cheap but safe and effective products and making Springfield safe for children. However, this causes the baby-injury-related business in Springfield to go in decline. Homer feels bad for making people such as pediatricians lose their jobs and urges the children to get themselves hurt in order to save the pediatricians' careers.

After realizing that Francine did not beat her up at the swimming pool because she was wearing a nose blocker, Lisa does scientific research on nerds and discovers that the odor of the chemical nerd pheromone "poindextrose" (a portmanteau of poindexter and dextrose) attracts bullies like Francine, proving that both nerds and bullies are predisposed to be what they are. Lisa then tests the poindextrose extracted from the nerds on famous boxer Drederick Tatum by putting it on his clothes when he visits the school. This causes Nelson to start punching Tatum uncontrollably and give him a wedgie. Lisa demonstrates her experiment at Professor Frink's science conference, the "12th Annual Big Science Thing", using an antidote on herself and making Francine peaceful and friendly towards her, the antidote being just salad dressing which covers up the smell of the poindextrose. The audience is impressed and Lisa is awarded a gift certificate from J. C. Penney for her research. However, the salad dressing soon runs out and Francine goes on an unprovoked rampage beating up all the scientists in the room. Francine’s parents suggest just letting Francine tire herself out from the beatings, just before Francine ends the episode by lunging forward, towards the viewer.

== Production ==
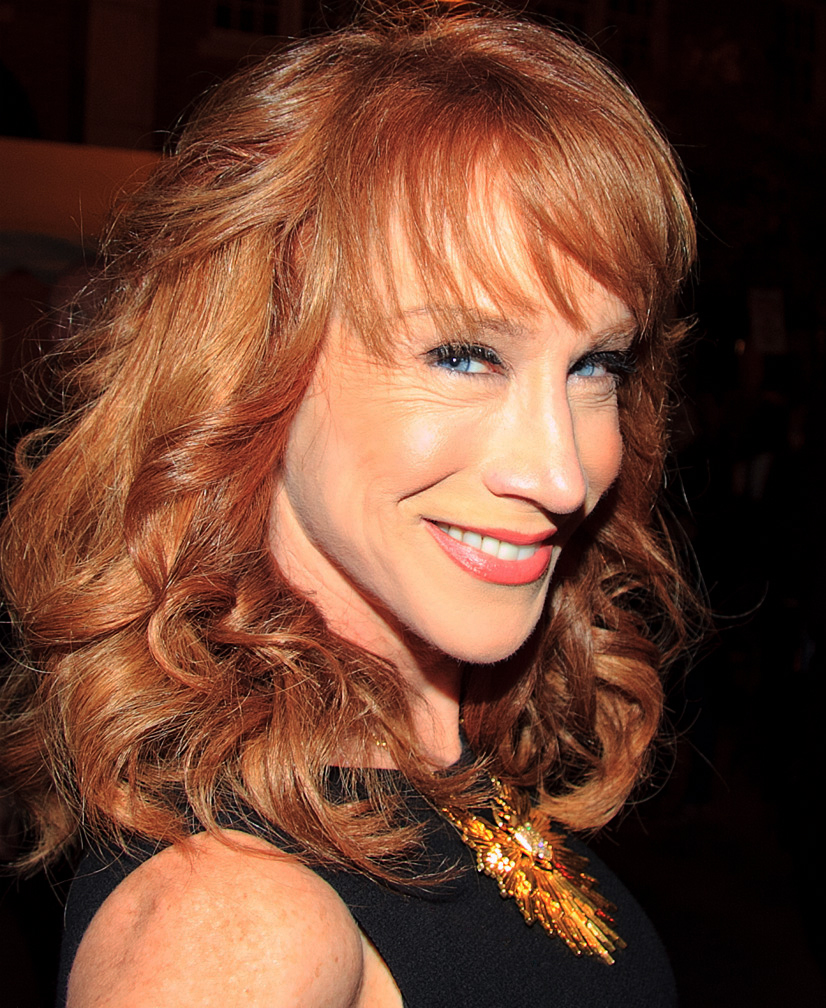
Actress Kathy Griffin appeared in the episode as the bully Francine.

The episode was produced as part of the twelfth season of The Simpsons (2000–01) and was written by writing partners John Frink and Don Payne. "Bye Bye Nerdie" was the first episode of the show directed by Lauren MacMullan, who joined the staff of The Simpsons following the cancellation of the short-lived television series Mission Hill, which was created by former Simpsons writers and executive producers Bill Oakley and Josh Weinstein on which she worked as a supervising director and designer. American actress and stand-up comedian Kathy Griffin guest starred in the episode as the bully Francine. Griffin was a fan of the show and got the role. MacMullan designed this new character herself and tried to make her seem like a professional bully by having her carry her lunch box with her all the time like a briefcase.

"Bye Bye Nerdie" was initially titled "Lisa the Bully" because the original idea for the episode, which the writers first pitched, saw Lisa becoming so fed up with Francine's behavior that she attempted to punch Francine. However, she would miss and accidentally punch Principal Skinner instead, resulting in her being sent to juvenile hall where she would make illegal jeans. The concept of a Simpson going to juvenile hall would later be reworked into Season 15's The Wandering Juvie. According to The Simpsons show runner Mike Scully, when the staff members worked on the episode they decided to include a lot of observations they had made about how it is like to be the new student in school. Scully has said that the episode shows how in real life the "poor new kid always has kind of two strikes against them just for being the new kid, and the other students are usually looking for anything that they perceive as different or weird about that kid."

The subplot of Homer entering the childproofing business was inspired by an instance when a salesman visited Payne and his pregnant wife to see if their home was safe for children. In an interview with Star-News, Payne commented: "You hire this person to come into your home to look for changes you can make. They make you feel like the most horrible person in the world and that your house is the temple of doom." "Bye Bye Nerdie" features a scene based specifically on this instance in which a saleswoman (voiced by cast member Tress MacNeille) selling childproofing items visits Homer and Marge and exaggerates the dangers in their home. NRBQ's song "Always Safety First" is played during a montage in the episode in which Homer is seen improving the safety of the infants of Springfield.

== Release ==
The episode originally aired on the Fox network in the United States on March 11, 2001. During this broadcast, it was watched in approximately 8.8 million households. It received an 8.7 Nielsen rating, ranking twenty-sixth in the ratings for the week of March 5–11, 2001. The episode was seen by a fourteen percent share of the television audience during the broadcast. On August 18, 2009, "Bye Bye Nerdie" was released on DVD as part of the box set The Simpsons – The Complete Twelfth Season. Staff members Mike Scully, Don Payne, Lauren MacMullan, Tim Long, Ian Maxtone-Graham, Matt Selman, Tom Gammill, Yeardley Smith, and Steven Dean Moore participated in the DVD audio commentary for the episode. Deleted scenes from the episode were also featured on the box set.

Critics have given "Bye Bye Nerdie" generally positive reviews. DVD Movie Guide's Colin Jacobson commented that "While this isn’t saying much, 'Nerdie' provides one of Season 12’s better shows. Both plots work well, though I prefer the childproofing side of things; it peters out at the end, but it has some good bits. The episode keeps us interested and entertained." Mac McEntire of DVD Verdict cited the scene in which the children imagine what kind of person the new student is as the greatest moment in the episode.

In the July 26, 2007 issue of Nature, the scientific journal's editorial staff listed "Bye Bye Nerdie" among "The Top Ten science moments in The Simpsons", writing: "Lisa isolates the element in nerd sweat that makes them irresistible targets for bullies. She presents her data at a conference with luminaries including former surgeon general C. Everett Koop, a scene in which we find the true purpose of a science pole." At the conference, Professor Frink gets the attention of the audience by shouting "Pi is exactly three!", making everyone gasp. This scene and the episode as a whole has been used by mathematicians Sarah J. Greenwald of Appalachian State University and Andrew Nestler of Santa Monica College in mathematics classes to teach students about the number pi (π).
