= The Great Money Caper =

- The Simpsons episode
- Episode no.: Season 12; Episode 7
- Directed by: Mike Frank Polcino
- Written by: Carolyn Omine
- Production code: CABF03
- Original air date: December 10, 2000

Guest appearances
- Edward Norton as Devon Bradley; Robby Krieger as himself (deleted scene)

Episode features
- Chalkboard gag: "The nurse is not dealing"
- Couch gag: The Simpsons swim to the couch in deep-sea diving gear. The camera zooms out to reveal that the living room is in a fish bowl.
- Commentary: Mike Scully; Al Jean; Ian Maxtone-Graham; Carolyn Omine; Don Payne; Matt Selman; Tom Gammill; Chuck Sheetz

Episode chronology
← Previous "The Computer Wore Menace Shoes"	Next → "Skinner's Sense of Snow"
- The Simpsons season 12

"The Great Money Caper" is the seventh episode of the twelfth season of the American animated television series The Simpsons. It first aired on the Fox network in the United States on December 10, 2000. In the episode, Homer, along with his son Bart, con people out of their money in order to pay for Homer's broken car. However, after having paid for the repairs, the two decide to continue grifting, which leads to some troublesome situations.

The episode was written by Carolyn Omine and directed by Mike Frank Polcino. The episode's title is a parody on The Great Muppet Caper. The episode features American actor Edward Norton as con artist Devon Bradley. In its original American broadcast, the episode received a 9.7 rating, according to Nielsen Media Research.

== Plot ==
The family goes to a magic-themed restaurant. While there, Marge gets drunk on Long Island Iced Teas and Bart becomes so fascinated with magic that he buys a magician's kit from the gift shop. On the way home, a sturgeon falls from the sky (implicitly from the Russian space station Mir) onto the family car's hood, which is severely damaged and cost $6,500 to repair. At the Squidport, Homer and Bart start their magic show as a way to make money, but the act becomes a failure as nobody gives money, and Homer leaves Bart to do the rest of the act on his own. Bart is left out on the street, and people begin giving him money so he can get home on public transportation.

As Homer drives home, he sees Bart in a taxi, and when he gets home he sees him eating a steak dinner. They decide they can make money grifting; however, Marge and Lisa begin suspecting them after they "worked" without Bart's kit, which they both left behind at home. Homer and Bart continue to grift after they have fixed the car. After a close call during an attempt to grift Ned Flanders (during which he notices its similarity to the plot of Paper Moon), Grampa volunteers to help them, since he was a con-artist during the Great Depression. Grampa, Homer, and Bart grift the residents at the Springfield Retirement Castle. While performing the grift, they are arrested by an FBI agent; however, Grampa evades arrest by stealing a motorised wheelchair and escaping. After Homer and Bart manage to put themselves in a police station cell (on the pretence of scaring Bart straight), they realize that the FBI agent himself is a con man, and has conned them out of their money and the car.

Homer and Bart say the car was stolen in the church parking lot. The next morning they are surprised however to learn that Groundskeeper Willie was arrested for stealing the car, as he matched the description they gave of the carjacker as a "foreign loner with wild, bushy hair". Not wanting to admit they were conned, Homer and Bart go along with Marge's theory. At the trial, the Blue Haired Lawyer leads Homer to say that it was Willie who stole the car. After Willie is proven guilty, he snatches Wiggum's gun and shoots Principal Skinner. At this point, Homer finally confesses that he got conned, but Marge and the townspeople themselves tell Homer and Bart that they set up the trial and the carjacking to teach them a lesson on conning people, revealing that Skinner was not really shot (it was a fake blood pack and the gun was loaded with blanks), the judge was Grampa wearing a latex mask, and the con man who stole their car was an actor called Devon Bradley. (Willie, however, was not privy to this scheme, as he angrily states.) As Lisa is ready to explain why the town, media and police officials had "nothing better to do" than show them the consequences of their actions, Otto runs through the courtroom doors, shouting, 'Surf's Up!'. The scene then cuts to Springfield at the beach, with characters from the episode surfing, including the waiter from the restaurant, the two astronauts from the Mir space station and the sturgeon swimming in the sea.

== Production ==
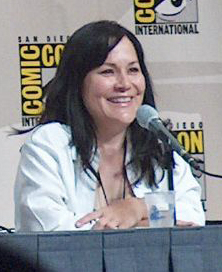
Carolyn Omine wrote the episode.

"The Great Money Caper" was written by Carolyn Omine and directed by Mike Frank Polcino. It was first broadcast on the Fox network in the United States on December 10, 2000.

Originally, the episode would be about pool hustling, however as writing ensued, the script went through several incarnations until the Simpsons writers settled on the grifting story seen in the episode. Omine read several books about grifters for preparation for writing the episode. The other writers also prepared themselves by watching several heist films, including House of Games, Paper Moon and The Sting, the latter two of which are referenced in the episode. For example, the revelation that Devon Bradley, the FBI agent in the episode who is revealed to be a con artist, was inspired by such films.

In a scene in the episode, Homer and Bart exit the Magic Palace's gift shop, only to end up in another gift shop. The scene was based on an experience of the episode's show runner Mike Scully, who, in order to exit the Lance Burton Theatre after a magic show, had to pass through a gift shop. The ending scene of the episode went through several changes and was as a result completed late in the episode's production. The writers had conceived the courtroom scene, but they were stuck trying to come up with an ending after Skinner had been shot. They eventually decided that the trial was a scam staged by the townspeople, and Simpsons writer George Meyer pitched the surfing scene that closed the episode.

=== Casting ===
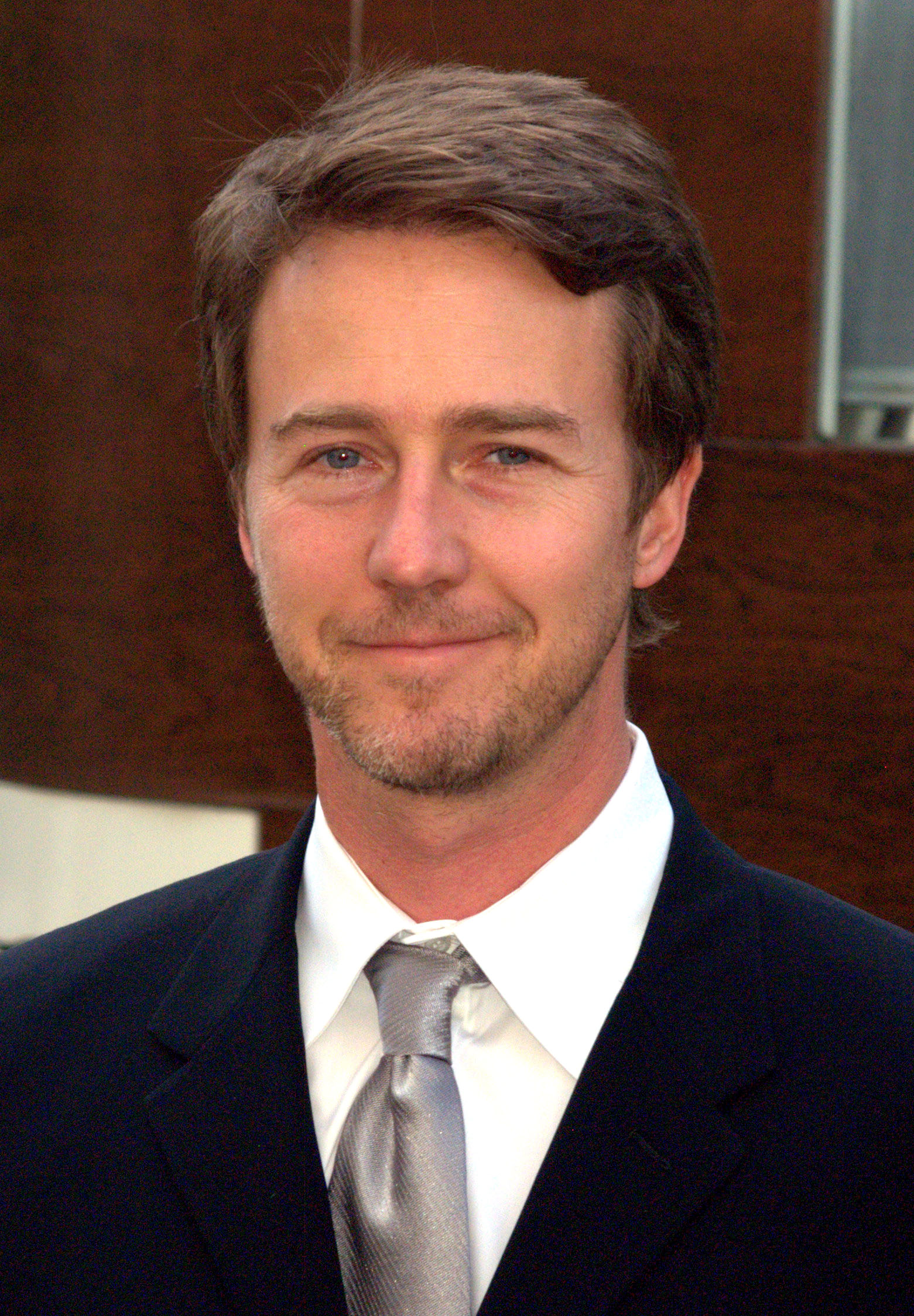
Edward Norton guest-starred as Devon Bradley in the episode.

A scene that was eventually dropped from the episode featured Robby Krieger, guitarist of the American rock band The Doors, as himself. Krieger had been promised a guest role on The Simpsons after the staff were allowed to use the Doors song "The End" for the season 11 episode "Hello Gutter, Hello Fadder". However, during production, Scully thought that the scene stood out too much and that Krieger's cameo felt "too obviously shoe-horned in," so the scene ended up being cut from the episode. The scene was later included in The Simpsons: The Complete Twelfth Season DVD set. To this day, Krieger has not officially been featured in an episode of The Simpsons. The con artist Devon Bradley was portrayed by American actor and director Edward Norton. Scully hired Norton for the role after James L. Brooks, one of The Simpsons' producers, told Scully that Norton was "a big fan of the show" and was willing to guest star in an episode. In the DVD audio commentary for the episode, Scully noted that Norton was very versatile and could imitate many Simpsons characters perfectly. The announcer at the "Magic Palace" who says the line "Folks, this is not part of the act" was voiced by Scully. According to him, the line was "a last-minute addition" to the episode.

== Cultural references ==
The episode's plot is loosely based on the American comedy film Paper Moon, which was also the inspiration for Bart and Homer's swindle of Ned Flanders in the episode; Flanders himself compares Homer and Bart giving him a customised Bible to the film. The title of the episode is a parody of the 1981 film The Great Muppet Caper, and was pitched by Simpsons writer Matt Selman. The episode's ending lampoons the cliche of having twist endings at the end of heist films. ”Magic Palace”, the magic-themed restaurant that the Simpsons visit in the beginning of the episode, is a parody on The Magic Castle, a nightclub in the Hollywood district of Los Angeles, California. Marge's line "I didn't say that for clapping" is a reference to a speech given by John Wayne while he was intoxicated. Homer wants to buy a singing rubber fish after their first con. At the end of the episode, Bart exclaims “Cowabunga!”, a catch-phrase of the main characters in the animated television series Teenage Mutant Ninja Turtles. In the scene where Grampa joins Bart and Homer, Grampa mentions the film The Sting II.

== Reception ==
In its original American broadcast on December 10, 2000, "The Great Money Caper" received a 9.7 rating, according to Nielsen Media Research, meaning it was seen by 9.7% of the population at the time of its broadcast. Among children, the episode was watched by 2.8 million viewers.

In his review of The Simpsons: The Complete Twelfth Season DVD box set, Colin Jacobson of DVD Movie Guide praised the episode. He wrote that, unlike other episodes in the season, "The Great Money Caper" did not "rely on too many gimmicks" and therefore felt more realistic, even though he does not consider grifting an "everyday activity." He concluded his review by writing that the episode "does well for itself."

Jason Bailey of DVD Talk described the episode as being one of the season's highlights.

However, Matt Haigh of Den of Geek cited "The Great Money Caper" as one of the worst episodes of the season, as well as the whole series. In his review, Haigh criticized the Simpsons writers for not making sense of the story, and denounced the episode's ending for being "abrupt".
