= Pokey Mom =

- The Simpsons episode
- Episode no.: Season 12; Episode 10
- Directed by: Bob Anderson
- Written by: Tom Martin
- Production code: CABF05
- Original air date: January 14, 2001

Guest appearances
- Michael Keaton as Jack Crowley; Charles Napier as the warden; Bruce Vilanch as himself; Robert Schimmel as a prisoner

Episode features
- Chalkboard gag: "I will not "let the dogs out""
- Couch gag: The Simpsons sit on the couch and the wall spins around, revealing on the other side a cackling Vincent Price and a scared Ned Flanders who is shackled upside-down.
- Commentary: Mike Scully; Ian Maxtone-Graham; Tom Martin; John Frink; Don Payne; Matt Selman; Dan Castellaneta; Joe Mantegna; Bob Anderson; Joel H. Cohen

Episode chronology
← Previous "HOMR"	Next → "Worst Episode Ever"
- The Simpsons season 12

"Pokey Mom" is the tenth episode of the twelfth season of the American animated television series The Simpsons. It originally aired on the Fox network in the United States on January 14, 2001. In the episode, Marge befriends Jack Crowley, a convict who she believes has some artistic potential. With Marge's help, Jack is granted parole and finds a mural-painting job at Springfield Elementary School. Meanwhile, Homer sustains a back injury after being kicked by a bull at the prison rodeo and goes to see a chiropractor. Despite this, his pain remains and it is not until he accidentally falls backwards onto a garbage can that his back injury disappears. Homer makes a successful business out of this injury-healing garbage can, much to the dismay of chiropractors in town.

The episode was written by Tom Martin and directed by Bob Anderson, and it features guest appearances from Michael Keaton as Jack, Charles Napier as a prison warden, Robert Schimmel as a prisoner, and Bruce Vilanch as himself. The title "Pokey Mom" is a pun on the video game franchise "Pokémon" and the term "pokey", a nickname given to prisons. "Pokey Mom" has been met with generally negative reviews from critics, being described as bland and drawn out. The staff members of the series received complaints from chiropractors after it aired, and some chiropractors have characterized the portrayal of the profession in the episode as stereotypical.

Around 8.79 million American homes tuned in to watch the episode during its original airing, and in 2009 it was released on DVD along with the rest of the episodes of the twelfth season.

== Plot ==
The Simpson family attends a prison rodeo where Marge meets Jack Crowley, a convict whom she believes to have great artistic potential after becoming impressed with his work. She later teaches a class on being an artist to the prisoners and befriends Jack. With Marge's help, Jack is granted parole under her custody. Marge soon finds a mural-painting job at Springfield Elementary School for him. Jack paints a powerful mural symbolizing school spirit with a warrior woman riding a puma, which the whole school likes, but Principal Skinner demands he tone it down using his idea of a cartoonish puma walking with two children under a rainbow in a fantasy land. Jack reluctantly gives in to his wishes; however, upon its unveiling, the new mural is panned by everyone in town. Refusing to admit that he forced Jack to create it in the first place, Skinner instead blames Jack and fires him.

Sometime later, the mural is set on fire by a mystery arsonist, and everyone manages to get a look at the real one before it burns up as well. Everyone in the school assumes Jack did it to get back at Skinner. While the police are out searching for Jack, Marge finds him hiding in the school playground. He swears to her that he did not start the fire. Marge believes him and distracts Skinner and Chief Wiggum so he can escape, but he instead sets fire to Skinner's car and dances around it laughing maniacally, revealing his true nature. Jack is arrested, and Marge, furious that he lied to her face, demands Wiggum to take him back to prison.

Meanwhile, Homer suffers a back injury by a bull from the rodeo and sees a chiropractor, but does not follow his instructions. Later, Homer falls backward onto a malformed garbage can at home and discovers that it solved his back problems. He makes a business out of his discovery, which proves to be a successful method of solving problems with pain, causing the chiropractic business to decline. Eventually, two chiropractors disguised as investors trick Homer and destroy the garbage can at the Simpsons' home.

== Production and cultural references ==
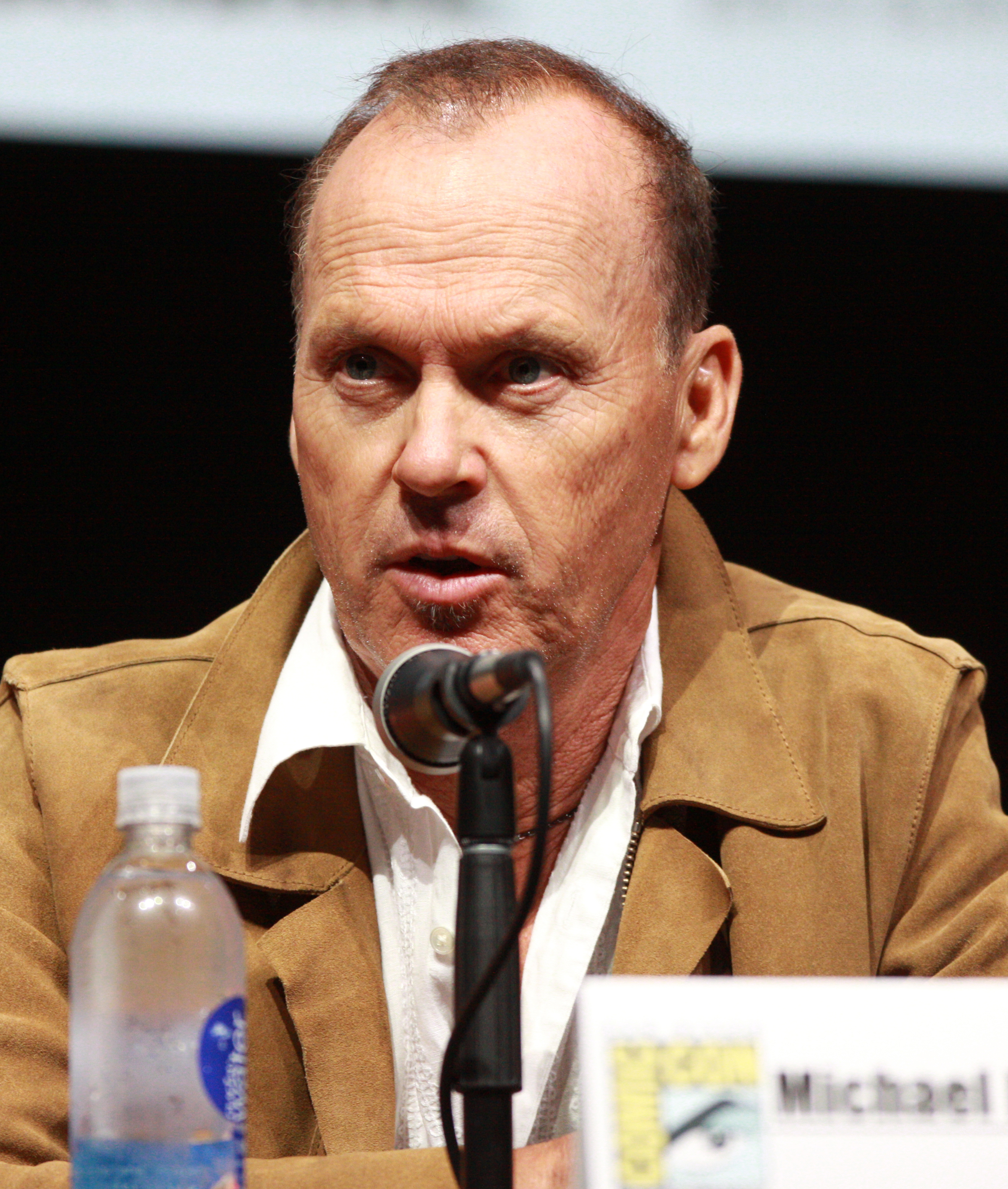
Michael Keaton guest-starred in the episode as Jack Crowley.

"Pokey Mom" was written by Tom Martin and directed by Bob Anderson as part of the twelfth season of The Simpsons (2000–2001). In its first draft on February 4, 2000, it was originally called "Marge Knows Why the Jailbird Paints." According to then-showrunner Mike Scully, the story of this episode originated from the fact that the staff members of The Simpsons wanted to do an episode about Marge but felt they did not want it to revolve around her getting a new job, as that had been seen on the show "too often". They decided to explore one of Marge's attributes that had been seen in earlier episodes, eventually choosing her interest in art. Martin conceived of the sub-plot surrounding Homer following a visit to a chiropractor. He has said that the "heart" of that story is that the chiropractors in Springfield become opposed to Homer's method of healing people and try to stop it after losing business, in reference to how chiropractors in real-life "are a bit hated by the AMA (American Medical Association)" and how the AMA has tried to restrict their businesses in the past. Martin has also noted that the episode shows how "a lot of chiropractors are these great healers and they do great work, and then there's some that are crooked."

Several famous Americans made guest appearances in the episode. Actor Michael Keaton guest-starred as Jack Crowley, while stand-up comedian Robert Schimmel appeared as a prisoner in Marge's art class that wants to smell her clothes. Actor Charles Napier voiced the prison warden that commentates the rodeo at the prison and later grants Jack his parole. Comedy writer and actor Bruce Vilanch guest-starred in the episode as himself at the unveiling of Jack's mural painting. There, Principal Skinner jokes to the audience that "when Superintendent Chalmers suggested a school mural, I almost thought he said a 'school Muriel'," referencing Chalmers' sister Muriel. When no one laughs at his joke and the audience is dead silent, Skinner sarcastically says "Well, thank you, Bruce Vilanch," to which Vilanch replies "Whoopi would've made it work." This is a reference to the fact that Vilanch has written comedy material for actress Whoopi Goldberg. Moe's line "forget it Homer, it's chirotown" after Homer's business is destroyed is a reference to the film Chinatown.

== Release ==
The episode originally aired on the Fox network in the United States on January 14, 2001. It was viewed in approximately 8.79 million households that night. With a Nielsen rating of 8.6, "Pokey Mom" tied with an episode of 60 Minutes for the 38th place in the ratings for the week of January 8–14, 2001. It was the third-highest-rated broadcast on Fox that week, following episodes of Temptation Island and Boston Public. On August 18, 2009, "Pokey Mom" was released on DVD as part of the box set The Simpsons – The Complete Twelfth Season. Staff members Tom Martin, Bob Anderson, Mike Scully, Ian Maxtone-Graham, John Frink, Don Payne, Matt Selman, and Joel H. Cohen, as well as cast members Dan Castellaneta and Joe Mantegna, participated in the DVD audio commentary for the episode. Deleted scenes from the episode were also included on the box set.

=== Reception ===
Critics have given "Pokey Mom" generally negative reviews. Nancy Basile of About.com said she "loathed" it. DVD Movie Guide's Colin Jacobson commented that "Other than a nice guest turn from Michael Keaton, 'Mom' doesn’t do much to stand out from the crowd. Oh, like much of Season 12, it keeps us interested, but that’s not exactly a strong endorsement. 'Mom' provides a watchable show but nothing more." Den of Geek critic Matt Haigh wrote that the episode "starts well, but begins to feel tired and drawn out, and there just doesn't seem to be much of a story there."

Following the original broadcast of the episode, the staff members of the series received several complaints from chiropractors. The February 26, 2001 issue of the magazine Dynamic Chiropractic featured an article about the episode that noted: "[The Simpsons] has poked fun at numerous people, and about every institution and profession imaginable. On January 17, it was chiropractic's turn." In an article of the magazine Canadian Chiropractor, Steven R. Passmore (D.C., M.S.) and Lorraine Kochanowski-Sutter (D.C.) analyzed the portrayal of chiropractors in the media. They gave "Pokey Mom" as an example of how "chiropractors on sitcoms pok[e] fun at themselves as they prescribe the duration of a course of care. [...] Dr. Steve on The Simpsons corroborates this stereotype when telling Homer that he will need to see him 'three times a week for many years.'" Passmore and Kochanowski-Sutter also noted that in the episode "we see a dreamcatcher on the wall behind Dr. Steve as he treats Homer. This strategically placed decoration could suggest that the chiropractor is in touch with native and/or natural healing, or it could be a jab at the field’s more esoteric practitioners."
