= Day of the Jackanapes =

- The Simpsons episode
- Episode no.: Season 12; Episode 13
- Directed by: Michael Marcantel
- Written by: Al Jean
- Production code: CABF10
- Original air date: February 18, 2001

Guest appearances
- Kelsey Grammer as Sideshow Bob; Gary Coleman as himself

Episode features
- Chalkboard gag: "The hamster did not have a 'full life'"
- Couch gag: A Sigmund Freud-esque psychologist sits on a chair and Homer leaps onto the couch and sobs "Oh doctor, I'm crazy!" while the rest of the family looks confused.
- Commentary: Mike Scully; Al Jean; Ian Maxtone-Graham; Yeardley Smith; Tim Long; Matt Selman; Michael Marcantel

Episode chronology
← Previous "Tennis the Menace"	Next → "New Kids on the Blecch"
- The Simpsons season 12

"Day of the Jackanapes" is the thirteenth episode of the twelfth season of the American animated television series The Simpsons. It first aired on the Fox network in the United States on February 18, 2001. In this episode, Krusty announces his retirement due to interference from network executives and the growing popularity of the game show Me Wantee. When Krusty reveals that all of the episodes featuring Sideshow Bob have been erased, Bob decides to murder Bart again by hypnotizing him into murdering Krusty during his farewell show.

"Day of the Jackanapes" was written by Al Jean and directed by Michael Marcantel and features recurring guest star Kelsey Grammer returning to voice Sideshow Bob, as well as Gary Coleman voicing himself. It features references to Johnny Carson, Bookends and Terminator 2: Judgment Day, among other things. It would also feature a parody of the song "Zip-a-Dee-Doo-Dah", but because the series' staff were not able to clear the rights for the song in time for the episode's broadcast, the song remained unreleased until 2007. In its original broadcast, the episode was seen by approximately 9 million viewers, finishing in 34th place in the ratings the week it aired.

Following its broadcast, the episode received positive reviews from critics.

== Plot ==
When the popular game show Me Wantee! (a parody of Who Wants to Be a Millionaire) steals ratings from The Krusty the Clown Show, Krusty, annoyed with the network executives, announces his fifth—and final—retirement. During an interview with Kent Brockman, he says he is tired of doing his show, and admits to taping Judge Judy over all his old shows featuring Sideshow Bob. Upon hearing this on TV, Bob vows revenge and plots to kill Krusty. Bob is released from prison and applies for a job at Springfield Elementary as an assistant janitor. However, Principal Skinner decides to make him the morning announcer. Over the announcements, he asks Bart to meet him in the abandoned tool shed. Sideshow Bob then hypnotizes Bart, and starts to program him to kill Krusty on sight. Bob tests his hypnoses by having Bart smash a statue of Krusty at a local Krusty Burger location.

The next night is Krusty's farewell special, and as Krusty describes the history of his career, Bob straps Bart with explosives in order to kill Krusty. Bart attempts to hug Krusty, thereby setting off the explosives, but before he can, Krusty talks to the audience about how he regrets mistreating Sideshow Bob, holding himself responsible for turning Bob into a ruthless criminal. Krusty even goes far by singing a song on behalf of Bob, stating how very remorseful he is of mistreating him. Upon witnessing this, Bob is touched and develops a change of heart, but does not have enough time to stop his original plan from being carried out. Luckily, Krusty's trained chimp Mr. Teeny sees the life-threatening explosives, which he throws into the network executives' office, breaking Bart's hypnotic state and killing all the executives, though they then reanimate themselves like the T-1000. After the show, the Simpsons have dinner with Krusty, Bob and Sideshow Mel in a restaurant. Although Krusty and Bob reconcile, the police decide to execute Bob by guillotine for his attempted murder plot, although he argues with Chief Wiggum that he should have a trial first.

== Production ==
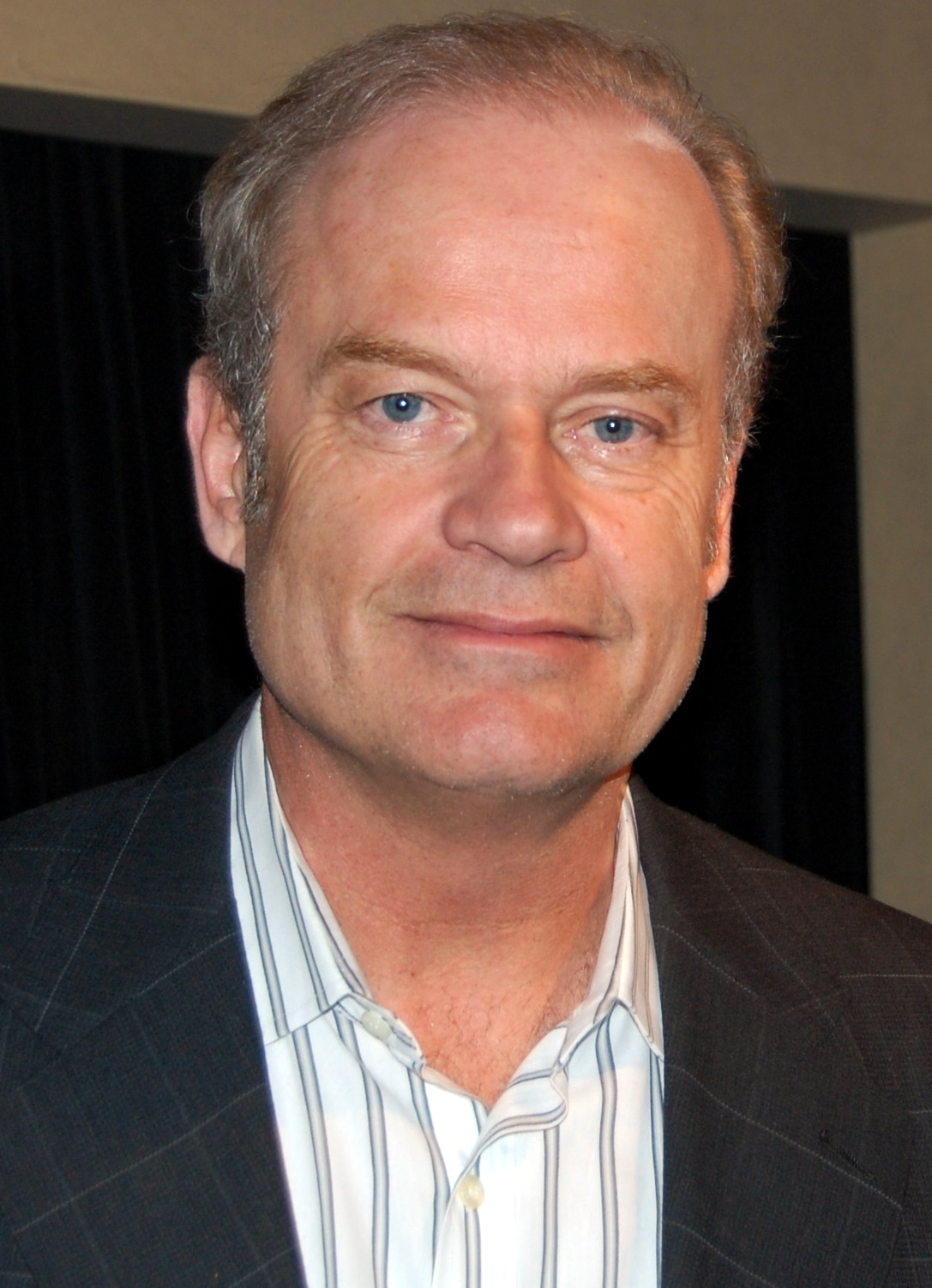
The writers wanted another Sideshow Bob episode so they could work with Kelsey Grammer again.

The first draft of "Day of the Jackanapes" was written by showrunner Al Jean. In the DVD commentary for the episode, Jean said that he had always wanted to write an episode about Sideshow Bob, and that "Day of the Jackanapes" would be a good way to have the character return. He also said that the writers wanted to work with Kelsey Grammer, who portrays Sideshow Bob, again. "Of all the guest stars we've had who've been great, he's right up there as the very best", he said.

Still, the writers had trouble with coming up with a story for Sideshow Bob since they had already explored several aspects of the character before. "It's just that we've done so many angles of whether he's, he's good, he's reformed and then his brother came to town..." executive producer and former showrunner Mike Scully said about the difficulty of writing episodes about Sideshow Bob.

At the beginning of the episode, Krusty is shown being pestered by network executives who comment on every choice he makes. He announces his departure from The Krusty the Clown Show after the executives give him notes during filming of a sketch. At the end of the episode, Mr Teeny is uncertain of where he should throw the plastic explosives that Bart wore. When he sees the two executives discussing in a room, he throws it onto them. Instead of dying of the explosion however, the pieces of the executives reconstitute into what Jean describes as a "super-executive".

These sequences were inspired by Jean's dissatisfaction with some network executives, who he felt took control over a television series he was working on before he returned to The Simpsons in 1999. "I had just worked on a show on another network [...] we had a show where there were a lot of notes from executives", Jean said of the inspiration for the scenes. The episode would originally have a different ending, but it was changed to its current iteration after the writers did not find the original ending humorous enough. When recording the DVD commentary however, Jean said that he was a bit dissatisfied with the new ending. "I think we did leave it a little hanging", he said.

During one of the recording sessions for the episode, The Simpsons' staff recorded "Hullaba Lula", a version of the 1946 song "Zip-a-Dee-Doo-Dah" with Grammer as Sideshow Bob on vocals. The song would originally be used in the episode, but the staff were not able to clear the rights for the song in time. It was therefore removed from the episode altogether, and remained unreleased until September 17, 2007, when it was included as a bonus track on the soundtrack album The Simpsons: Testify. Aside from Grammer, the episode also features American actor Gary Coleman as himself.

== Cultural references ==
The episode's title is a play on the 1971 political thriller novel The Day of the Jackal, while its plot is based on the 1959 political thriller novel The Manchurian Candidate. Before filming an episode of his show, Krusty is stopped by the two network executives, who attempt to explain to him why the sitcom Seinfeld worked as a series. After Krusty has announced the cancellation of his show, a group of crying children are seen at the Krustylu Studios, where the show is filmed. The name of the studio is based on Desilu Studios, a television company based in Los Angeles. In an interview with Kent Brockman, Krusty says that he taped over all episodes of his show that Sideshow Bob was in with episodes of the reality court show Judge Judy. This is a reference to how NBC reused tapes of early episodes of The Tonight Show to film new programs. While in the Springfield Elementary School's tool-shed, Sideshow Bob accidentally steps on a rake and says "Rakes, my old arch-enemy." This is a reference to the scene, in the season 5 episode "Cape Feare", where Sideshow Bob steps on rakes a ridiculous number of times.

At one point in his last show, Krusty performs while sitting on a stool, a reference to television host Johnny Carson's last appearance on The Tonight Show. While watching Krusty's final show, Sideshow Bob holds a bag of Kettle Chips and says "Kettle Chips, the perfect sidedish for revenge." Because of this scene, the writing staff received several bags of Kettle Chips from Kettle Foods, according to Jean. When asking for Sideshow Bob's forgiveness, Krusty sings a song to the tune of "Mandy" by Barry Manilow. The picture behind him is based on the cover of Bookends by Simon & Garfunkel. After having exploded, the two network executives reform into a "super-executive". The scene is a reference to the 1991 science fiction action film Terminator 2: Judgment Day. Another reference to Terminator 2 is found earlier in the episode when Krusty drives a golf cart away from the network executives and one of them tries to cling on with golf clubs, similar to the T-1000. At the end of the episode, Krusty and Sideshow Bob reconcile in a restaurant. On the wall behind them are several pictures of guest stars that had previously appeared on The Simpsons, including Mark McGwire, Ringo Starr, Sting, Tom Jones, Brooke Shields and Elizabeth Taylor.

== Reception ==
In its original American broadcast on February 18, 2001, "Day of the Jackanapes" received an 8.8 rating, according to Nielsen Media Research, translating to approximately 9 million viewers. The episode finished in 34th place in the ratings for the week of February 12–18, 2001, tying with an episode of Malcolm in the Middle. On August 18, 2009, the episode was released as part of a DVD set called The Simpsons: The Complete Twelfth Season. Mike Scully, Al Jean, Ian Maxtone-Graham, Yeardley Smith, Tim Long, Matt Selman and Michael Marcantel participated in the audio commentary for the episode.

Following its home video release, "Day of the Jackanapes" received positive reviews from critics. In his review of The Simpsons: The Complete Twelfth Season, Mac McEntire of DVD Verdict described the episode as a "winner". He especially enjoyed the scene in which Bart hits a statue of Krusty in the groin with a baseball bat. DVD Talk's Jason Bailey wrote that this episode and "Insane Clown Poppy" both "really shine", and Will Harris of Bull-Eye.com wrote that the episode was "a crowd-pleaser across the board."

Colin Jacobson, of DVD Movie Guide wrote that, although it does not compare with the best Sideshow Bob episodes, it still "looks good" compared to the rest of the season. He enjoyed the lampooning of network executives, and though he did not consider the episode to be a "classic", he maintained that it "fares pretty well."

IGN's Robert Canning also wrote that, although the episode is overall "solid", it is "lacking that extra something" that the best Sideshow Bob episodes have. Nevertheless, it reached number eight on the website's list of ten best Sideshow Bob episodes of the series.
