= Homer the Moe =

- The Simpsons episode
- Moe (right) and the Swigmore University professor (left), just before the professor drowns himself in the campus lake. The professor, voiced by Dan Castellaneta, was based both visually and characteristically on Professor Charles W. Kingsfield Jr. from the television show The Paper Chase.
- Episode no.: Season 13; Episode 3
- Directed by: Jen Kamerman
- Written by: Dana Gould
- Production code: CABF20
- Original air date: November 18, 2001

Guest appearance
- R.E.M. as themselves.

Episode features
- Chalkboard gag: "A burp in a jar is not a science project"
- Couch gag: A football is thrown in the center of the living room. The Simpsons, dressed as football players, tackle each other for the ball.
- Commentary: Matt Groening; Mike Scully; George Meyer; Ian Maxtone-Graham; Dana Gould; Matt Selman; Joel H. Cohen; Kevin Gould

Episode chronology
← Previous "The Parent Rap"	Next → "A Hunka Hunka Burns in Love"
- The Simpsons season 13

"Homer the Moe" is the third episode of the thirteenth season of the American animated television series The Simpsons. It first aired on the Fox Network in the United States on November 18, 2001. In the episode, Moe, following the advice of his former bartending professor, decides to modernize his bar. The bar's new image attracts several customers, but leaves Moe's four regular customers, Homer, Lenny, Carl, and Barney, feeling alienated, which in turn prompts Homer to open his private bar, disguising it as a hunting club to avoid liquor license restrictions.

The episode was directed by Jen Kamerman and was the first episode Dana Gould wrote for The Simpsons. Gould based the part about Homer's bar on his father, who opened a hunting club to sell alcohol without having to acquire a liquor license. The episode featured the musical group R.E.M., who appeared as themselves.

The episode received mixed reviews from critics following the thirteenth season's release on DVD and Blu-ray.

== Plot ==
After Homer tells a story about Bart digging a hole in the backyard for no apparent reason other than to make it deeper and bigger while the Chinese are spying on him, Moe complains about the monotony at his tavern. Recalling his days at Swigmore University, he decides to return there for some inspiration and leaves Homer in temporary charge of the bar. At the university, Moe finds his old professor, who is dying of cancer. After advising Moe to modernize his bar, the professor drowns himself in the campus lake. Soon, the tavern is renovated by Formico, the self-proclaimed "Dean of Design", into a swanky nightclub renamed "M" and with a post-modern decor.

Homer and his bar-buddies Lenny, Carl and Barney find that they do not fit in with the new, affluent crowd, and miss their old tavern experience. Homer decides to convert his garage into a new tavern for himself and his friends. Meanwhile, Moe is confronted by the ghost of his professor and realizes that he does not fit in with his new clientele and leaves to find Homer. Arriving at the Simpsons' home, he finds that the new garage bar has quickly become quite popular, and even has the alternative rock band R.E.M. playing.

When confronted by Moe with the fact that it is illegal to operate a bar in a private residence, Homer claims that it is a hunting club, citing a law book that states that a hunting club may provide refreshing beverages. Moe consults the book and determines that the club must engage in the sport of hunting, to which Homer states that he will hunt for a turkey for Thanksgiving dinner, much to Lisa's horror.

Homer sets out the next day to find a turkey, but Lisa and Moe scare off his quarry, using a whistle that sounds like a cougar. However, Homer mistakes the whistle for an actual cougar and accidentally shoots Moe in the leg. After Homer apologizes, he, along with Moe, R.E.M. and the rest of the Simpson family return to Moe's tavern, reverted to its original decor, for a Thanksgiving meal of a turkey, made "entirely of tofu and gluten" and provided by Michael Stipe, an environmentalist. Homer even affirms his friendship with Moe by putting some money in his tip jar.

== Production ==
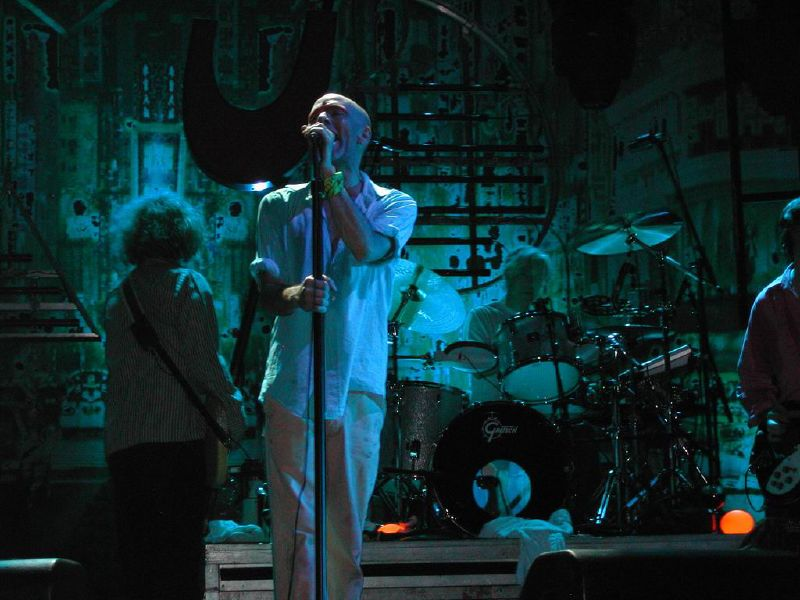
Alternative rock band R.E.M. guest starred as themselves in the episode.

"Homer the Moe" was directed by Jen Kamerman and was the first episode Dana Gould wrote for the show. It was the first broadcast on Fox in the United States on November 18, 2001, four days before Thanksgiving.

In the DVD commentary for the episode, Gould says that, when the team was thinking of a way to start the show, George Meyer said, "I like how kids will just dig a hole". Homer's story ends with a Chinese satellite spying on Bart. This was an attempt by Gould to write a bizarre joke in the style of fellow Simpsons writer John Swartzwelder. Moe's plot in the second act was also created by Meyer, who suggested that the bartending school that Moe attended would resemble the law school on the 1970s television series The Paper Chase, and that the school's professor would be based on the professor from the earlier series.

Gould remembered how his father opened a hunting club and could sell alcohol without having to obtain a liquor license. This inspired the idea of Homer's club. Also, the "crossed-fishing-pole-and-rifle" insignia that can be seen in Homer's garage is the same insignia that Gould's father uses for his hunting club. Homer's bar was originally the center of the episode but became the third act when the writers came up with the renovation of Moe's bar and made it the main storyline.

Alternative rock band R.E.M. guest-starred as themselves in the episode. "We had been told that R.E.M. were big fans of the show", says executive producer and showrunner for the episode, Mike Scully, adding that their appearance in the episode was a "fairly last-minute addition". Unlike The Who, who made an appearance in the episode "A Tale of Two Springfields", R.E.M. did not want their former drummer Bill Berry to be animated in the episode. The drummer seen in the episode was instead drawn to resemble one of their session drummers at the time. Moe's professor at Swigmore University was voiced by the series' regular voice actor Dan Castellaneta, the voice of Homer among many others. Formico, who renovated Moe's tavern, was portrayed by Hank Azaria, who also voices Moe as well as several other characters in the show.

== Cultural references ==
Swigmore University, which Moe attends in the episode, is a parody of Skidmore College. The professor working at Swigmore University is based on Professor Charles W. Kingsfield, Jr. from the television series The Paper Chase. The dying professor entering the lake is a reference to the movie Being There, in whose ending it is revealed Mr. Chance can walk on water. Moe's new bar M is a parody of the luxury boutique hotel W New York Union Square that Gould had visited once. The monitors showing eyeballs are based on similar decorations found in the elevators in the St Martin's Lane hotel, where the Simpsons' staff hosted a Simpsons festival. The doorman in front of M was modeled after special effects creator and actor Greg Nicotero. The dance that Homer, Carl, and Lenny perform in Moe's bar is a takeoff on the dancing in the comedy/drama film Coyote Ugly, in which the dancers performed on the bar counter, much like Homer, Carl and Lenny do in the episode.

== Release ==
In its original American broadcast on November 18, 2001, "Homer the Moe" was watched by 14.5 million viewers, according to Nielsen Media Research, making it the most watched television show of its timeslot that night. The episode received a 7.1 rating/17 share among adult viewers between ages 18 and 49, meaning it was seen by 7.1% of the population between ages 18 and 49, and 17% of people in this demographic watching television at the time of its broadcast. On September 14, 2004, "Homer the Moe" was released, along with the episodes "Homer's Night Out", "The Mansion Family" and "Sunday, Cruddy Sunday" on a DVD set entitled The Simpsons – Gone Wild. The episode was later included in The Simpsons: The Thirteenth Season DVD and Blu-ray set, released August 24, 2010.

"Moe" reminds me too much of season three's "Flaming Moe's", as both featured a change of fortune for our favorite surly bartender. Still, despite the derivative elements, it works reasonably well.

— Colin Jacobsson, DVD Movie Guide

Giving the episode a rating of C−, Jennifer Malkowski of DVD Verdict described the episode as a "tepid remix of previous Simpsons plots".

Ron Martin of 411Mania called the plot "unimaginative" and wrote "I suppose there's only enough episodes you can go through before Moe's has to modernize in the most hideous way".

IGN reviewer R.L. Shaffer wrote that "Homer the Moe", "The Frying Game", "The Old Man and the Key", and "Sweets and Sour Marge" were some of the worst episodes of the whole series.

However, Colin Jacobsson of DVD Movie Guide wrote that even though the episode was too similar to the third-season episode "Flaming Moe's", the episode "works reasonably well". He gave the episode a favorable review overall, calling it "one of the year's best episodes".

Adam Rayner of Obsessed With Film wrote that the story was "told very well and continued to show the strength of the character of ‘Moe’, who would go on to be one of the only genuinely funny characters in the following barren years for the show".

Casey Broadwater of Blu-ray.com described the episode as one of the best of the season, and Aaron Peck of High-Def Digest stated that the episode was one of his personal favorites.

In 2007, Simon Crerar of The Times listed R.E.M's performance as one of the thirty-three funniest cameos in the history of the show.

Andrew Martin of Prefix Mag named R.E.M. his tenth-favorite musical guests on The Simpsons out of a list of ten in 2011.
