= Little Girl in the Big Ten =

- The Simpsons episode
- Episode no.: Season 13; Episode 20
- Directed by: Lauren MacMullan
- Written by: Jon Vitti
- Production code: DABF15
- Original air date: May 12, 2002

Guest appearance
- Robert Pinsky as himself

Episode features
- Couch gag: The Simpsons run in and find The Squeaky-Voiced Teen and a teenage girl making out on the couch.
- Commentary: Al Jean; Ian Maxtone-Graham; Matt Selman; Tom Gammill; Max Pross; Robert Pinsky

Episode chronology
| ← Previous "The Sweetest Apu" | Next → "The Frying Game" |
- The Simpsons season 13

"Little Girl in the Big Ten" is the twentieth episode of the thirteenth season of the American animated television series The Simpsons. It originally aired on the Fox network in the United States on May 12, 2002. In the episode, Lisa befriends two college students at a gym and attends college with them. Meanwhile, after being bitten by a mosquito from a Chinese-made toy, Bart is infected with the "panda virus" and is placed in a plastic bubble to prevent others from infection.

"Little Girl in the Big Ten" was directed by Lauren MacMullan and written by Jon Vitti. The episode's main plot was pitched by Vitti, who suggested an episode in which Lisa meets girls who thought she was a college student. The subplot was pitched by the Simpsons writing staff, who wanted it to be completely different from the main story. The episode features former three-time U.S. Poet Laureate Robert Pinsky as himself.

In its original broadcast, the episode was seen by approximately 6.8 million viewers and finished in 40th place in the ratings the week it aired.

Following its home media release on August 24, 2010, the episode received mixed reviews from critics.

== Plot ==
Lisa finds herself unable to do any sports in PE class, taught by Brunella Pommelhorst, and finds herself failing physical education. She then signs up to do gymnastics with Coach Lugash. There, she receives encouragement from the ghost of John F. Kennedy in a vision. With boosted self-confidence, and her large head which gives her perfect balance, Lisa passes with flying colors. Lisa also meets two girls and becomes friends with them, but with their fractals and parking permits, she realizes they are college students "with small gymnast bodies!" They give Lisa a ride home, and she acts like a college student to fit in with them. The girls invite her to a poetry reading by former Poet Laureate Robert Pinsky soon after. Lisa tries to keep up her double life, attending poetry readings at night with the girls while wearing a beret and falling asleep in her second grade class during the day.

Meanwhile, Bart gets bitten by a Chinese mosquito that was in his Krusty-saurus toy, and becomes infected with "Panda virus". To prevent others from getting sick, Dr. Hibbert puts Bart in a Bart-sized plastic bubble for the next few days. Bart initially has trouble adapting to life in the bubble; he has trouble eating and Homer gives him a bath by filling up the bubble with the hose and rolling Bart around the house. However, Bart soon finds that his bubble brings him a lot of popularity after he is able to bounce off the attacks from the bullies.

While going to Springfield University, Lisa is tracked by Milhouse, Martin, and Database who see her ride away. At a lecture on Itchy & Scratchy cartoons, Milhouse blows Lisa's cover and she flees at being unaccepted by her friends. Lisa tries to convince Homer and Marge that college suits her, but they tell her that college is no place for her at her age. Lisa is also ridiculed by Groundskeeper Willie and all of her friends at school, saying that she is too "college for them". Bart tells Lisa that she must pull a prank on Principal Skinner to get her friends back. The next day, Superintendent Chalmers is dedicating the Seymour Skinner Parking Annex. While Martin takes pictures of Skinner posing next to a giant chocolate cake in his white polyester suit, Bart rolls Lisa, who is inside his bubble, to the edge of the school's roof. He then pushes her over the edge, splattering the cake all over Skinner. Lisa gets her friends back, while Bart grows paranoid after being outside of his bubble for the first time in days. He stays in an air vent, but gets sucked in.

== Production ==
"Little Girl in the Big Ten" was written by producer Jon Vitti and directed by Lauren MacMullan. The idea for the episode was pitched by Vitti, who suggested an episode in which Lisa meets girls who thought she was a college student. It was first broadcast on the Fox network in the United States on May 12, 2002. Jean thought the idea was "brilliant", and the subplot involving Bart in a "germ-free" plastic bubble was conceived by the writers wanting to make "the most different subplot from[...] an intellectual college plot" they could think of. A scene in the episode shows Lisa talking to Bart on the branch of a tree in their garden. Bart says the line "You can't believe what that sunset looks like to me", to which Lisa replies "That's not a sunset, that's a bird on fire." Originally, Lisa's line read "[...] that's a plane on fire," however, after the September 11 attacks, the line was considered offensive and was changed. "[...] since we work so far ahead we usually do these things that are sort of timeless stories," Jean said, "but every once in a while there's something that turns out to be ironic in a bad way, then we have to change it."

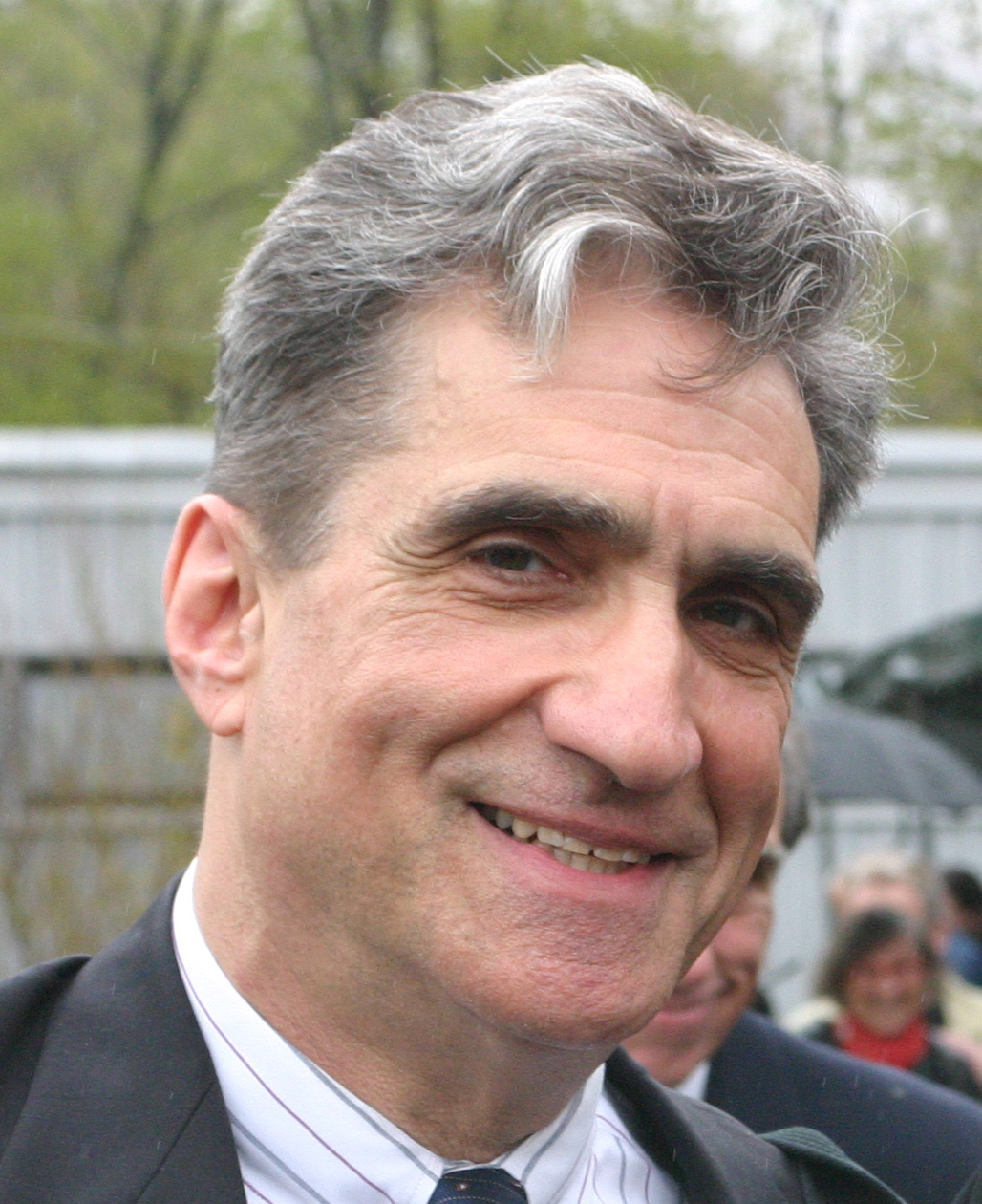
Former poet laureate Robert Pinsky guest starred as himself in the episode.

The Itchy & Scratchy cartoon "Butter Off Dead" was, according to Jean, "completely improv[ise]d" by director MacMullan. Usually, the episodes are too "narrow" for there to be any room for improvisation, but MacMullan was an exception, since her improvisations "always turned out great". The writers came up with the cartoon's title and its "template", however "the way the death proceeded and the different digestion[s]" were "All Lauren [MacMullan]". The sequence in which Pinsky is reading the poem was "very hard to do", since the animators did not have access to computers at the time. One of the audience members in the scene was designed after staff writer Matt Warburton.

The episode features former poet laureate Robert Pinsky as himself. Pinsky was chosen to guest star because the writers wanted an intellectual reference for Lisa, and because they knew that Pinsky was a fan of the show, having read an article of The Time in which Pinsky stated that he "admired the writing" of The Simpsons. In the DVD audio commentary for the episode, Pinsky stated that he flew to the Simpsons recording studios in Los Angeles on September 10, 2001, and, following the September 11 attacks, was "stranded" there for four days, since no planes were flying following the attacks. Pinsky enjoyed his stay however; "Ian [Maxtone-Graham] and The Simpsons people were very nice to me," he said. "... One of the things they did for me is they invited me to a table-read of another episode[...] Thursday the 13th[...] I remember everybody laughed like hell[...] It felt really good. People just went to work and everybody laughed a lot."

Pinsky stated that he felt "really inept" when recording his dialogue. He said: "Amongst my friends I'm funny. In that context of Dan Castellaneta... I would say it was like a disaster movie, and I was that character played by Susan Hayward." The poem Pinsky reads in the episode was picked by the Simpsons writing staff, "The poem has two jokes in it," Pinsky said, "and when I say jokes I don't mean witty remarks. It's more like an optician, the pope and a zebra go into the bar and then there's a punch line at the end." He stated that the poem was "an elegy for a friend of mine who liked jokes". He added that his appearance on the show gave him "a lot more prestige" when visiting high schools and colleges. The episode also features Karl Wiedergott as the professor at the Springfield University.

== Cultural references ==
The episode's subplot was based on the 1976 television film The Boy in the Plastic Bubble, in which a boy born with an improperly functioning immune system lives out his life in incubator-like conditions. In one of Lisa's college courses, the students are watching an Itchy & Scratchy cartoon titled "Butter Off Dead". The lecture was a reference to college courses which include The Simpsons episodes in their teachings. The gate to Springfield University was based "loosely" on the ivy gate at Harvard University. The episode also parodies the British anarcho-punk band Chumbawamba, with Homer singing his own version of their song "Tubthumping". When Lisa changes her bike's appearance to pass as a college student the main theme from The Pink Panther movie plays, composed by Henry Mancini. When Bart rolls Lisa off the school roof and she dives into the cake the introduction from Also sprach Zarathustra by Richard Strauss plays.

== Release ==
In its original American broadcast on May 12, 2002, "Little Girl in the Big Ten" received a 6.4 rating, according to Nielsen Media Research, translating to approximately 6.8 million viewers. The episode finished in 40th place in the ratings for the week of May 6–12, 2002, making it the most watched program of the network tied with Malcolm in the Middle and Boston Public. On August 24, 2010, "Little Girl in the Big Ten" was released as part of The Simpsons: The Complete Thirteenth Season DVD and Blu-ray set. Al Jean, Ian Maxtone-Graham, Matt Selman, Tom Gammill, Max Pross and Robert Pinsky participated in the audio commentary of the episode.

Following its home media release, "Little Girl in the Big Ten" received mixed reviews from critics.

Nate Boss of Project-Blu called it "An average episode, for the series as a whole, making it a great one for this season," praising "a superb Chumbawumba parody" which he thought was "way better than the R.E.M. lyrics gag earlier in the season."

Colin Jacobson of DVD Movie Guide wrote "Lisa–based shows definitely fall into the hit or miss category, and "Ten" stays within those confines." While he praised some of Homer's scenes, including "his drunken versions of pop songs," he maintained that "not much else connects." He concluded his review by writing "Though we find the occasional laugh, the overall impact remains lackluster."

DVD Verdict's Jennifer Malkowski gave the episode a B−, and wrote that "Homer's answer to the rhetorical question about gymnastics 'Who wants to put on a leotard and get screamed at?'" was the episode's "highlight".

In March 2014, The Simpsons writers picked "Butter Off Dead" from this episode as one of their nine favorite Itchy & Scratchy episodes of all time.
