= The Sweetest Apu =

- The Simpsons episode
- Episode no.: Season 13; Episode 19
- Directed by: Matthew Nastuk
- Written by: John Swartzwelder
- Production code: DABF14
- Original air date: May 5, 2002

Guest appearance
- James Lipton as himself

Episode features
- Chalkboard gag: "I will never lie about being cancelled again"
- Couch gag: The Simpsons come in just as two repo men take the couch away, Homer then starts crying.
- Commentary: Al Jean; Ian Maxtone-Graham; Matt Selman; Tim Long; Dan Castellaneta; James Lipton; Matt Warburton

Episode chronology
← Previous "I Am Furious (Yellow)"	Next → "Little Girl in the Big Ten"
- The Simpsons season 13

"The Sweetest Apu" is the nineteenth episode of the thirteenth season of the American animated television series The Simpsons. It originally aired on the Fox network in the United States on May 5, 2002. In the episode, Homer and Marge discover that convenience store owner Apu is having an affair with the Squishee delivery lady working in his store.

"The Sweetest Apu" was written by John Swartzwelder and directed by Matthew Nastuk. It features Inside the Actors Studio host James Lipton as himself. It also features references to The New Yorker, photographer Richard Avedon and the film Wild Wild West. In its original broadcast, the episode was seen by approximately 7.1 million viewers and finished in 37th place in the ratings the week it aired.

Following its home video release on August 24, 2010, the episode received mixed reviews from critics.

== Plot ==
Apu sells Homer a beer keg for the American Civil War reenactment of the Battle of Springfield. At the reenactment, Principal Skinner watches as Springfielders disobey him and hold a rather inaccurate battle (featuring an orange plaid clad "East" faction, a roller skating Stonewall Jackson portrayed by Disco Stu, and a giant steam-powered super spider made by Professor Frink). After the battle, Homer brings the empty, dented keg back to Apu at the Kwik-E-Mart in an attempt to get the deposit. There, he hears a giggle coming from a closet and finds Apu making love with the woman who delivers Squishees to Kwik-E-Mart, Annette. He then walks backwards in shock all the way home to his bed and then relives the encounter in his dreams when he falls asleep.

Marge figures out what Homer saw from the movements of his pupil. They decide not to tell Manjula but while they are playing badminton, Homer and Marge act awkwardly with Manjula and Apu looking at them, trying not to give out hints Apu cheated on Manjula. They then confront Apu and he says he will break up with Annette. However, he breaks his promise. Later, Manjula watches the surveillance footage of Apu cheating and kicks him out. To help get them together, Homer and Marge invite them both to dinner, but do not tell them that the other one is coming. After a failed attempt with Bart and Lisa, Apu tries to promise to Manjula that he will change, but Manjula refuses to listen and demands a divorce.

Homeless, Apu moves into the apartment complex where Kirk Van Houten lives. The octuplets then speak their first words, which put together, say "Mommy, will you let daddy come back...cookie!" Marge and Manjula go to Apu's and arrive in time to prevent him from committing suicide by hanging. Apu is then subjected to several tasks to redeem himself, including breaking up with Annette, though Manjula says it will take time for everything to get back to normal. In bed, Manjula, finally satisfied with what he has done, kisses Apu while Homer watches from the window, on a ladder. The couple continues and Homer, traumatized, hops backwards on the ladder all the way home, without falling, mimicking what he did earlier.

== Production and cultural references ==
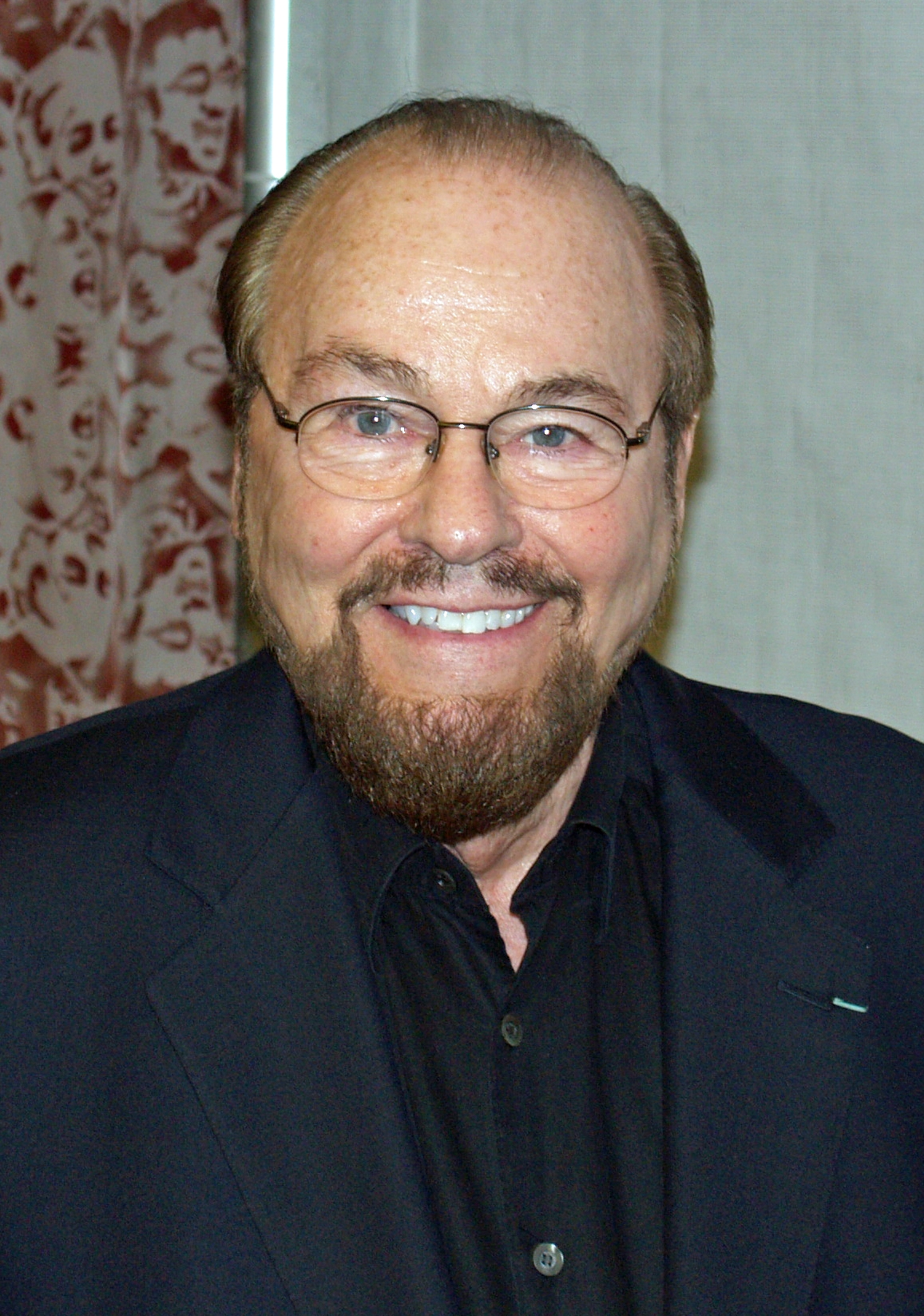
Talk show host James Lipton guest starred as himself in the episode.

"The Sweetest Apu" was written by former Simpsons writer John Swartzwelder and directed by director Matthew Nastuk. It was first broadcast on the Fox network in the United States on May 5, 2002. After seeing Apu cheating on Manjula with the squishee girl, an extensive scene in which Homer dramatically backs out of the room, into the Simpson house and into his bed is shown. The scene was conceived by episode writer Swartzwelder. Another scene in the episode shows Apu breaking up with the Squishee lady in front of her house. Originally, police chief Clancy Wiggum would be seen in a robe inside the house, implying that other men in Springfield cheat on their wives as well, however it was dismissed because the writers thought it would look "too sad". Originally, Swartzwelder wanted the kama sutra sex position in the episode to show several arms and legs "sticking out in crazy positions", however it received a censor note and the Simpsons staff were allowed to show "less and less" of it as time progressed.

The episode features American writer and actor James Lipton, host of the television program Inside the Actors Studio, as himself. The divorce lawyer was portrayed by series regular voice actor Hank Azaria, and was based on "many lawyers that the writing staff had faced," according to current show runner Al Jean.

Professor Frink's steam-powered "Super-spider" seen during the reenactment is a reference to the 1999 steampunk film Wild Wild West. One of Apu's promises to Manjula is to get a comic strip printed in The New Yorker. American photographer Richard Avedon is also mentioned in the episode.

== Release ==
In its original American broadcast on May 5, 2002, "The Sweetest Apu" received a 6.7 rating, according to Nielsen Media Research, translating to approximately 7.1 million viewers. The episode finished in 37th place in the ratings for the week of April 29-May 5, 2002. On August 24, 2010, "The Sweetest Apu" was released as part of The Simpsons: The Complete Thirteenth Season DVD and Blu-ray set. Al Jean, Ian Maxtone-Graham, Matt Selman, Tim Long, Dan Castellaneta, James Lipton and Matt Warburton participated in the audio commentary of the episode.

Following its home video release, "The Sweetest Apu" received mixed reviews from critics.

DVD Movie Guide's Colin Jacobson wrote "I don’t recall ever being particularly excited by other Manjula episodes, and 'Sweetest' does nothing to alter that perception." He praised Homer's reaction to seeing Apu cheating on Manjula, but maintained that "much of the remaining gags tend to be lackluster." He concluded by writing "This ends up as a pretty flat, forgettable show."

Project-Blu's Nate Boss called it "An average episode, by this season's standards," describing it as "a bit too cut and dried for my taste."

Writing for Blu-ray.com, Casey Broadwater wrote that "The Sweetest Apu" is "near-laughless", and Ryan Keefer of DVD Talk wrote "The less said about this episode, the better."

Ryan Keefer of DVD Talk wrote, "Does Jean manage to get The Simpsons to reclaim some of the tarnish off the crown? Sure, but it's not without its duds; 'The Sweetest Apu' and 'The Old Man and The Key' were borderline painful'.

On the other hand, giving the episode a positive review, Jennifer Malkowski of DVD Verdict gave the episode a B, praising the "Badminton [scene] and its many double entendres" as the episode's "highlight".
