= The Frying Game =

- The Simpsons episode
- Episode no.: Season 13; Episode 21
- Directed by: Mike Frank Polcino
- Written by: John Swartzwelder
- Production code: DABF16
- Original air date: May 19, 2002

Guest appearances
- Carmen Electra as herself; Frances Sternhagen as Mrs. Bellamy

Episode features
- Couch gag: The Simpsons are dressed as silent movie characters.
- Commentary: Matt Groening; Al Jean; Matt Selman; John Frink; Don Payne; Tom Gammill; Max Pross; Mike Frank Polcino; Deb Lacusta

Episode chronology
| ← Previous "Little Girl in the Big Ten" | Next → "Poppa's Got a Brand New Badge" |
- The Simpsons season 13

"The Frying Game" is the twenty-first and penultimate episode of the thirteenth season of the American animated television series The Simpsons. It first aired on the Fox network in the United States on May 19, 2002. In the episode, after accidentally injuring an endangered caterpillar, Homer is sentenced to two weeks of community service. As part of his sentence, Homer delivers Meals on Wheels to an old woman called Mrs. Bellamy, who subtly guilt trips him, and later Marge, into becoming her personal servants. One day, the two find Mrs. Bellamy dead in her house, having been stabbed by a man with braces who quickly escapes the murder scene. Being the only ones present when the police arrive, Homer and Marge are soon suspected for the murder. The episode also features a "Snuh cascade", an homage to a group of Simpsons fans on Usenet.

"The Frying Game" was written by John Swartzwelder and directed by Mike Frank Polcino. The screamapillar was conceived by the episode's writer, who pitched it to the other staff writers. It has since been described as a satire on the Endangered Species Act, a United States environmental law passed during the 1970s. The idea that Homer's execution was in fact part of a reality game show was conceived by former staff writer George Meyer. The episode features Frances Sternhagen as Mrs. Bellamy and Carmen Electra as herself. In its original broadcast, the episode was seen by approximately 6.5 million viewers, finishing in 46th place in the ratings the week it aired.

Following its home video release, the episode received mixed reviews from critics.

== Plot ==
Homer gives Marge a koi pond for their anniversary, but an endangered "Screamapillar" takes refuge in the pond. Bound by law to care for it, Homer accidentally injures the loud, annoying larva while reading a bedtime story. For trying to bury the larva to cover up the injury, Homer is sentenced to two weeks of community service for "attempted insecticide and aggravated buggery".

Homer begins delivering Meals on Wheels to an elderly woman, Mrs. Bellamy, who takes a liking to him. She subtly guilt trips Homer, and later Marge, into becoming her personal servants. When Bellamy turns up dead, having been stabbed with a pair of scissors, Homer and Marge are the prime suspects in the murder, even though they witnessed a man with braces leaving the murder scene with Bellamy's necklace. The people of Springfield are very suspicious of Homer and Marge, and Chief Wiggum does not believe their story. Finally, during an inspection of the house, Maggie is found with Bellamy's necklace, and Wiggum arrests Homer and Marge. Bart, Lisa and Maggie are adopted by Cletus Spuckler, who decides to change their names to "Dingus Squatford Jr." and "Pamela E. Lee".

Despite not undergoing lie detector or DNA tests, both are sentenced to death by electric chair. In a bid to spare Marge, Homer confesses to the warden that he acted alone, and Marge is released. As Homer is sitting in the electric chair, it is suddenly revealed that he is on a new Fox reality TV show, Frame Up. Bellamy's murder was merely part of an elaborate hidden camera scheme, the man with the braces is the show's host, and Bellamy is guest host Carmen Electra in disguise. Chief Wiggum is annoyed that the police department's time and taxpayers' money was wasted on what turned out to not even be a real case, but is excited to learn he will be in the show and has them give Lou and Eddie producer credits. Homer and Marge are reunited with the kids, but Homer is infuriated that he had to suffer just so the show could get higher ratings; as Electra tries to explain, he ends up staring at her breasts.

== Production ==
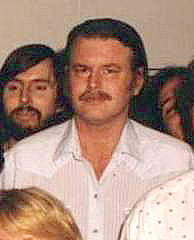
John Swartzwelder, (above) who wrote the episode, also conceived the screamapillar

"The Frying Game" was written by John Swartzwelder and directed by Mike Frank Polcino. It was first broadcast on the Fox network in the United States on May 19, 2002. The screamapillar, the larva that the Simpsons find in their garden, was, according to current showrunner Al Jean, Swartzwelder's "total conception." He pitched the idea to The Simpsons writing staff, and because they found it "hilarious," they decided to include it in the episode. Jean said that when people ask what sense of humor Swartzwelder has, the screamapillar is "one of the best examples". It was voiced by main cast member Dan Castellaneta, who portrays Homer among other characters in the series. Because the screamapillar only communicates by screaming, its lines were recorded last during recording sessions, as the screaming would "burn out" Castellaneta's voice.

In a scene in the episode, Homer is on death row and eats his last meal. The meal consists solely of junk food like hamburgers and fried chicken. The scene came from an article that the writers had read, in which it said that death sentenced prisoners often requested junk food as their last meal. On the way to the electric chair, Homer meets a man resembling Michael Clarke Duncan's character John Coffey in The Green Mile. While recording lines for the episode, the staff were told that Duncan was visiting the Fox studios. Having not recorded the lines for the character yet, the staff asked Duncan if he wanted to voice the character, but he declined. The music that plays during the scene is also from The Green Mile. The idea that Homer's execution was in fact a reality show on Fox was conceived by former staff writer George Meyer. According to fellow writer Matt Selman, the writing staff liked the idea since reality shows were "really big" at the time. The episode features American actress Frances Sternhagen as Mrs Bellamy, and glamour model Carmen Electra as herself. According to Jean, Electra's character is "one of the most voluptuous figures" they have ever had on The Simpsons.

== Themes ==
In the DVD commentaries, creator Matt Groening and the majority of people who work on the show state several times that they are very liberal, but some, such as John Swartzwelder (the writer of this and many other The Simpsons episodes), are conservative. In his book The Really Inconvenient Truths: Seven Environmental Catastrophes Liberals Don't Want You to Know About- Because They Helped Cause Them, Iain Murray described "The Frying Game" as "subversively conservative", and wrote that it shows "The best popular explanation of the liberal environmentalist model for endangered species." In the episode, Homer buys a koi pond for Marge, only to find a screamapillar has taken residence in their garden. When Homer tries to squash it, an EPA official tells him that allowing an endangered species to die is a federal offense, under the "Reversal of Freedoms Act of 1994." Homer is forced to coddle the screamapillar, and when he accidentally squashes it, Homer is found guilty of "attempted insecticide and aggravated buggery." The "Reversal of Freedoms Act" is a reference to the Endangered Species Act, an environmental law that Murray opined had "indeed become the Reversal of Freedoms Act." He continued, "Landowners who happened to have threatened or endangered species on their lands or who simply have habitat that might be used by endangered species are routinely prevented from using their lands or property. They are stopped from undertaking such activities as harvesting their trees, grazing their cattle, irrigating their fields, clearing brush along fence lines, disking firebreaks around their homes and barns, or building new homes.

== Release ==
In its original American broadcast on May 19, 2002, "The Frying Game" received a 6.2 rating, according to Nielsen Media Research, translating to approximately 6.5 million viewers. The episode finished in 46th place in the ratings for the week of May 13–19, 2002. On August 24, 2010, "The Frying Game" was released as part of The Simpsons: The Complete Thirteenth Season DVD and Blu-ray set. Matt Groening, Al Jean, Matt Selman, John Frink, Don Payne, Tom Gammill, Max Pross, Mike Frank Polcino and Deb Lacusta participated in the audio commentary of the episode.

Following its home video release, "The Frying Game" received mixed reviews from critics.

Giving the episode a positive review, Colin Jacobson of DVD Movie Guide described the episode as "pretty good", writing "I like the obnoxious Screamapillar, and the way the Simpsons become seen as murderers also amuses. This allows S13 to move toward a satisfying conclusion."

Nate Boss of Project-Blu praised the episode's ending in particular, writing "the ending to this episode is fucking briliant [sic], as it is a wonderful statement about society today, that has almost become prophetic. Can't and won't spoil it, but damn, great idea! (Yes, since there have been about eight more seasons, it's obvious they don't die. That's hardly a spoiler!)"

DVD Verdict's Jennifer Malkowski gave the episode a B+, declaring the episode's "highlight" "one of the reasons the Screamapillar is endangered, that it's 'sexually attracted to fire.'"

On the other hand, giving the episode a negative review, Andre Dellamorte of Collider described it as "terrible."

DVD Talk's Ryan Keefer wrote a negative review as well, calling it "definitely forgettable" and criticizing it for "fall[ing] apart quickly." Ron Martin of 411Mania criticized the Screamapillar character, describing it as "just as annoying as Homer's constant screaming earlier in the season."
