= The Parent Rap =

- The Simpsons episode
- Episode no.: Season 13; Episode 2
- Directed by: Mark Kirkland
- Written by: George Meyer; Mike Scully
- Production code: CABF22
- Original air date: November 11, 2001

Guest appearances
- Jane Kaczmarek as Judge Constance Harm; Marcia Wallace as Mrs. Krabappel; Jess Harnell as Poncho the Seal

Episode features
- Chalkboard gag: "Nobody reads these anymore"
- Couch gag: The Simpsons jump out of the painting of the simply drawn sailboat behind the couch.
- Commentary: Matt Groening; Mike Scully; George Meyer; Ian Maxtone-Graham; Matt Selman; Tim Long; Dana Gould; Joel H. Cohen; Kevin Gould

Episode chronology
← Previous "Treehouse of Horror XII"	Next → "Homer the Moe"
- The Simpsons season 13

"The Parent Rap" is the second episode and official premiere of the thirteenth season of the American animated television series The Simpsons. It originally aired on the Fox network in the United States on November 11, 2001. In the episode, after Bart takes a joyride in a police car, a judge orders him to be tethered to Homer at all times.

The episode was written by George Meyer and Mike Scully, who also served as the show runner for the episode, and Mark Kirkland worked as the director. The writers based the story on “a couple of incidents” in real life in which troublesome children, through alternative sentencing, were tethered to their parents. The episode marks the first appearance of the infamous and notoriously cruel Judge Constance Harm, who is voiced by actress Jane Kaczmarek.

When it was first broadcast, “The Parent Rap” was watched by 14.4 million viewers, making it the second most watched show of its timeslot that night. After its release on DVD and Blu-ray, however, the episode garnered mixed reviews from critics.

== Plot ==
After missing the bus, Bart and Milhouse are given a ride to school by Homer, but are evicted from the car after Homer spots the opportunity to win a competition by local radio station KBBL (the prizes being $40 and a Blue Öyster Cult medallion). Being forced to walk to school, they get into trouble and are arrested for stealing Chief Wiggum's squad car. Milhouse gets off but when Bart comes to the bench, Judge Constance Harm (voiced by Jane Kaczmarek) takes over and lays down the law while Judge Snyder is on his fishing trip. Upon learning that Homer deliberately ditched Bart for the radio station prize, Judge Harm angrily sentences both of them to be tethered together. Initially, this brings Bart and Homer closer together, despite Homer disrupting Bart's education and later getting cut up by glass during a baseball game. However, things soon go wrong, such as Bart being left outside in the cold while Homer drinks at Moe's, and again when Marge and Homer try to have sex when Bart does his homework, leading father and son to fight one another. Fed up with the punishment, Marge then finally cuts the tether, only for her and Homer to be brought back before Harm and have their heads and hands locked up in old-fashioned wooden pillories, as well as being slapped on the buttocks from passing cars.

Unable to bear the punishment any longer, they break free using Ned Flanders's power tools and decide to get back at the judge by hanging an insulting banner from her houseboat. The plan goes awry when they are cornered by Harm's guard seal Poncho and accidentally sink the boat, being once again brought into court. When Bart pleads to take full responsibility for his parents' actions, Harm agrees and almost sentences Bart to five years in juvenile hall when Snyder returns from his fishing trip and declares a verdict of "Boys will be boys," dismissing the case. While driving home afterwards, Marge makes the entire family promise not to break the law again for a whole year — a promise that Homer instantly breaks when he accidentally runs over Hans Moleman.

== Production and cultural references ==
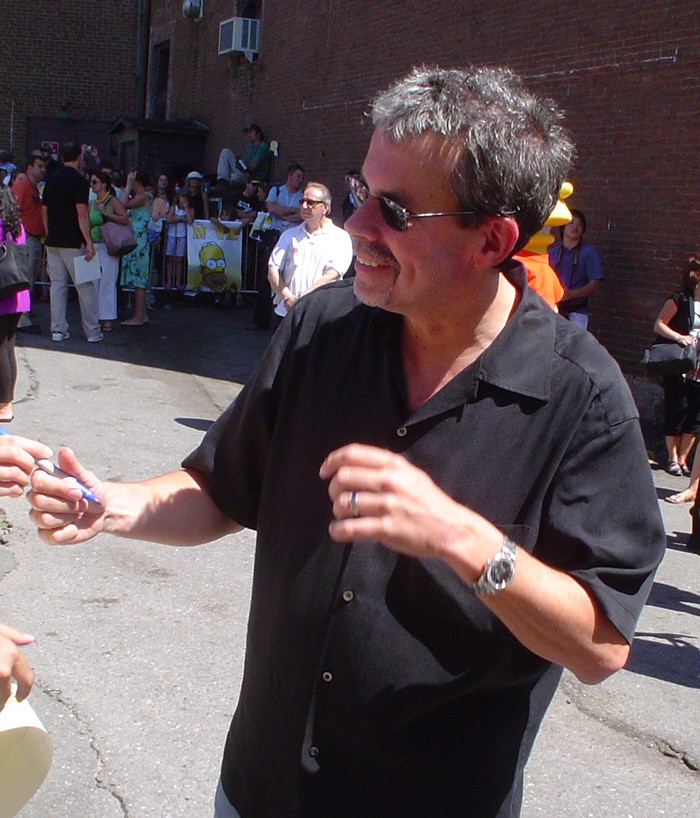
The Simpsons show runner Mike Scully (left) and writer George Meyer (right) co-wrote the episode.

"The Parent Rap" was co-written by George Meyer and Mike Scully, and Mark Kirkland served as the director for the episode. It was first broadcast on the Fox network in the United States on November 11, 2001. The title of the episode is a reference to The Parent Trap. Even though "Treehouse of Horror XII" - the first episode of the thirteenth season - had aired the previous week, "The Parent Rap" was considered the official premiere of the season. "The Parent Rap" was the last episode written in its production line. "As I recall, we got toward the end of the season and we had to write another episode in a hurry", said Meyer in a DVD audio commentary for the episode. Judge Constance Harm is a parody of Judge Judy.

The writing staff contributed a rough outline for the episode, and Meyer and Scully went into one of the writer's room and "basically, kind of locked [themselves] in for five days" writing the episode. Meyer and Scully both thoroughly enjoyed the writing process of the episode; "It really came together easily", stated Meyer, "...because we had known each other so long and were comfortable with each other's style". Ian Maxtone-Graham, one of the writers for The Simpsons, commented that the draft Meyer and Scully had written was "awfully good".

The episode was based on "a couple of incidents" that the writers had heard about in which troublesome children, through alternative sentencing, were tethered to their parents. The scene in which Homer and Marge get spanked by Springfield's citizens as part of their punishment was also based on an alternative sentencing, in which the sentenced had to wear certain shirts or signs that indicated whether they, for example, had not paid taxes. The scene in which Bart accidentally drives away with Chief Wiggum's police car was based on one of Scully's friends in high school, who stole a still running police car parked at a Dunkin' Donuts while the police were in the store.

The episode featured the first appearance of Judge Constance Harm, portrayed by American actress Jane Kaczmarek. At the time of the episode's airing, Kaczmarek starred on Fox's Malcolm in the Middle. The character's name was conceived by Meyer, who had always thought that Constance was a scary name.

The episode makes several references to Blue Öyster Cult's hit song "(Don't Fear) The Reaper", which also plays during the episode's end credits, and inspired the title of a later episode. Meyer later got to meet the band, who said that they were "stoked" to be referenced in a Simpsons episode.

== Release ==
In its original American broadcast on November 11, 2001, "The Parent Rap" was seen by approximately 14.4 million viewers, according to Nielsen Media Research. The episode received a 6.9 rating/16 share among adults between ages 18 and 49, making it the second most-watched television show of the night in its demographic. The episode was listed among the 15 most watched shows in its demographic that week.

Following the episode's broadcast, as well as the home video release of thirteenth season of The Simpsons, "The Parent Rap" received generally mixed reviews from critics.

Writing for the Daily News, Eric Mink gave the episode a mixed review. "To be sure, the show has its moments", wrote Mink, "But there's not much zip here, and the show has, of all things, a warm-and-fuzzy ending... 'The Simpsons' and warm-and-fuzzy is not a healthy combination".

Nate Boss of Project-Blu described the episode as "filler" and praised the episode's concept, but criticized how the episode was executed.

Colin Jacobson of DVD Movie Guide also gave the episode a mixed response, and wrote that "'Rap' starts with a clever – if absurd – concept", but "does little to churn good comedy out of its theme", and concluded by calling the episode "disappointing".

Jennifer Malkowski, reviewing the season for DVD Verdict, was more positive towards the episode. Giving the episode a rating of B+, Malkowski listed "The Parent Rap" among episodes in the season where "We see wacky scenarios force Homer to bond with his family, to a rather heartwarming effect".

Ron Martin of 411Mania was also favorable, calling the episode "decent".
