= The Simpsons season 13 =

Season of television series

The Simpsons
- Season 13
- DVD cover featuring Ralph Wiggum
- Showrunners: Al Jean (17 episodes); Mike Scully (5 episodes)
- No. of episodes: 22

Release
- Original network: Fox
- Original release: November 6, 2001 – May 22, 2002

Season chronology
- ← Previous; Season 12 Next → Season 14

The thirteenth season of the American animated sitcom The Simpsons aired on Fox between November 6, 2001, and May 22, 2002. It consists of 22 episodes. The showrunner for the thirteenth production season was Al Jean, who executive-produced 17 episodes. Mike Scully executive-produced the remaining five, which were all hold-overs that were produced for the previous season. The Simpsons is an animated series about an American family, which consists of Homer, Marge, Bart, Lisa, and Maggie. The show is set in the fictional city of Springfield, and lampoons American culture, society, television and many aspects of the human condition.

The season won an Annie Award for Best Animated Television Production, and was nominated for several other awards, including two Primetime Emmy Awards, three Writers Guild of America Awards, and an Environmental Media Award. The Simpsons ranked 30th in the season ratings with an average viewership of 12.4 million viewers. It was the second-highest-rated show on Fox after Malcolm in the Middle. Season 13 was released on DVD in Region 1 on August 24, 2010, Region 2 on September 20, 2010, and Region 4 on December 1, 2010.

== Production ==
Mike Scully served as executive producer for the show for seasons nine to twelve. Five of the episodes produced for season 12 were held over and aired as part of the thirteenth season. He left the show following season 12 and was replaced by Al Jean. Jean was one of the original writers for The Simpsons, and served as executive producer of the third and fourth seasons with Mike Reiss before leaving the show in 1993. Jean returned full-time to The Simpsons during the tenth season (1998), this time without Reiss. Jean called it "a great job with a lot of responsibility," and cited "the fact that people love it so much" as "great".

This is the last full season to use cel animation, though five episodes from this season's production cycle would air during the following season as holdover episodes. "Treehouse of Horror XIII", a season 13 holdover, tested the method, and the series permanently switched to digital animation in the 14th production season, starting with "The Great Louse Detective."

Writers credited with episodes in the thirteenth season included Joel H. Cohen, John Frink, Don Payne, Carolyn Omine, George Meyer, Mike Scully, Dana Gould, John Swartzwelder, Ian Maxtone-Graham, Matt Selman, Tim Long, Jon Vitti, Matt Warburton, Deb Lacusta, Josh Lieb and cast member Dan Castellaneta. Freelance writers included Bill Freiberger. Animation directors included Bob Anderson, Mike B. Anderson, Mark Kirkland, Jen Kamerman, Lance Kramer, Nancy Kruse, Lauren MacMullan, Michael Marcantel, Pete Michels, Steven Dean Moore, Matthew Nastuk, Michael Polcino, Jim Reardon and Chuck Sheetz.

== Voice cast & characters ==
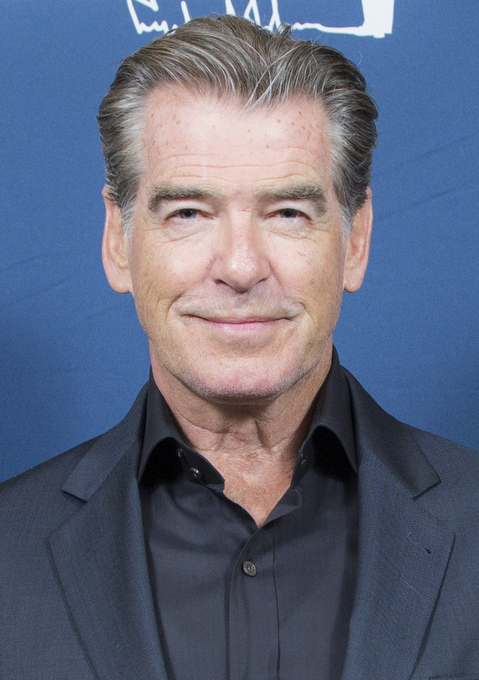
Pierce Brosnan voices himself and Ultrahouse 3000's Pierce Brosnan voice in "Treehouse of Horror XII"

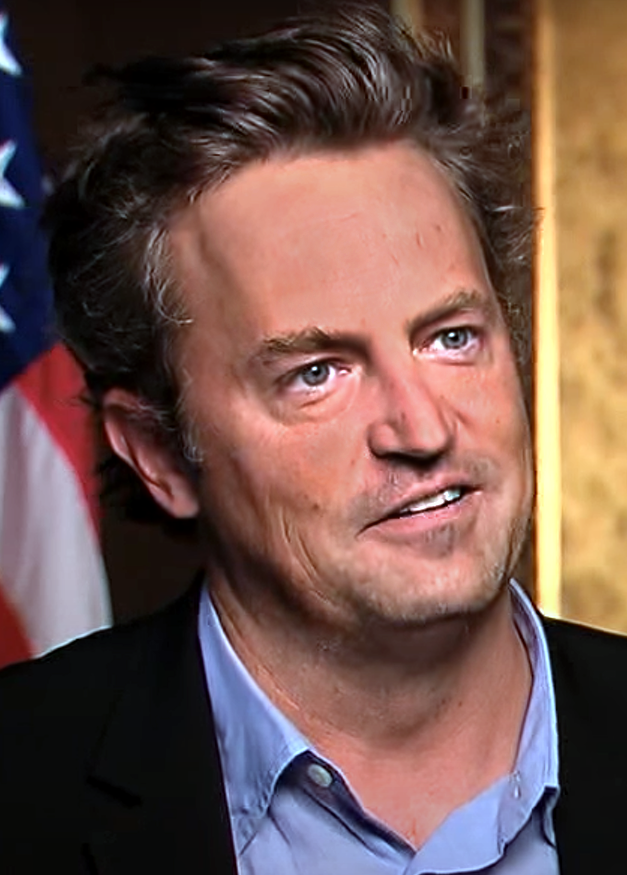
Matthew Perry voices Ultrahouse 3000's Matthew Perry voice in "Treehouse of Horror XII"

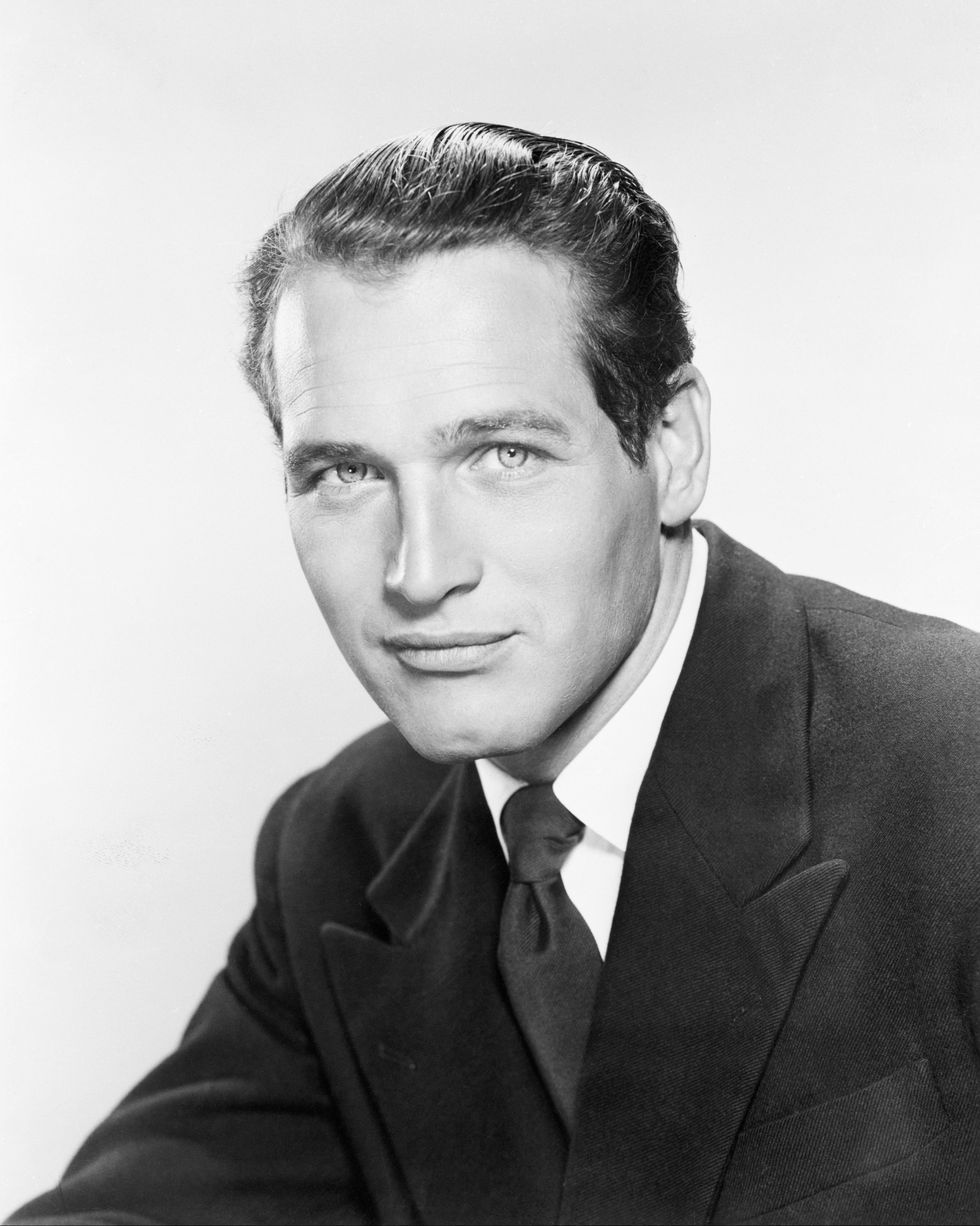
Paul Newman voices himself in "The Blunder Years"

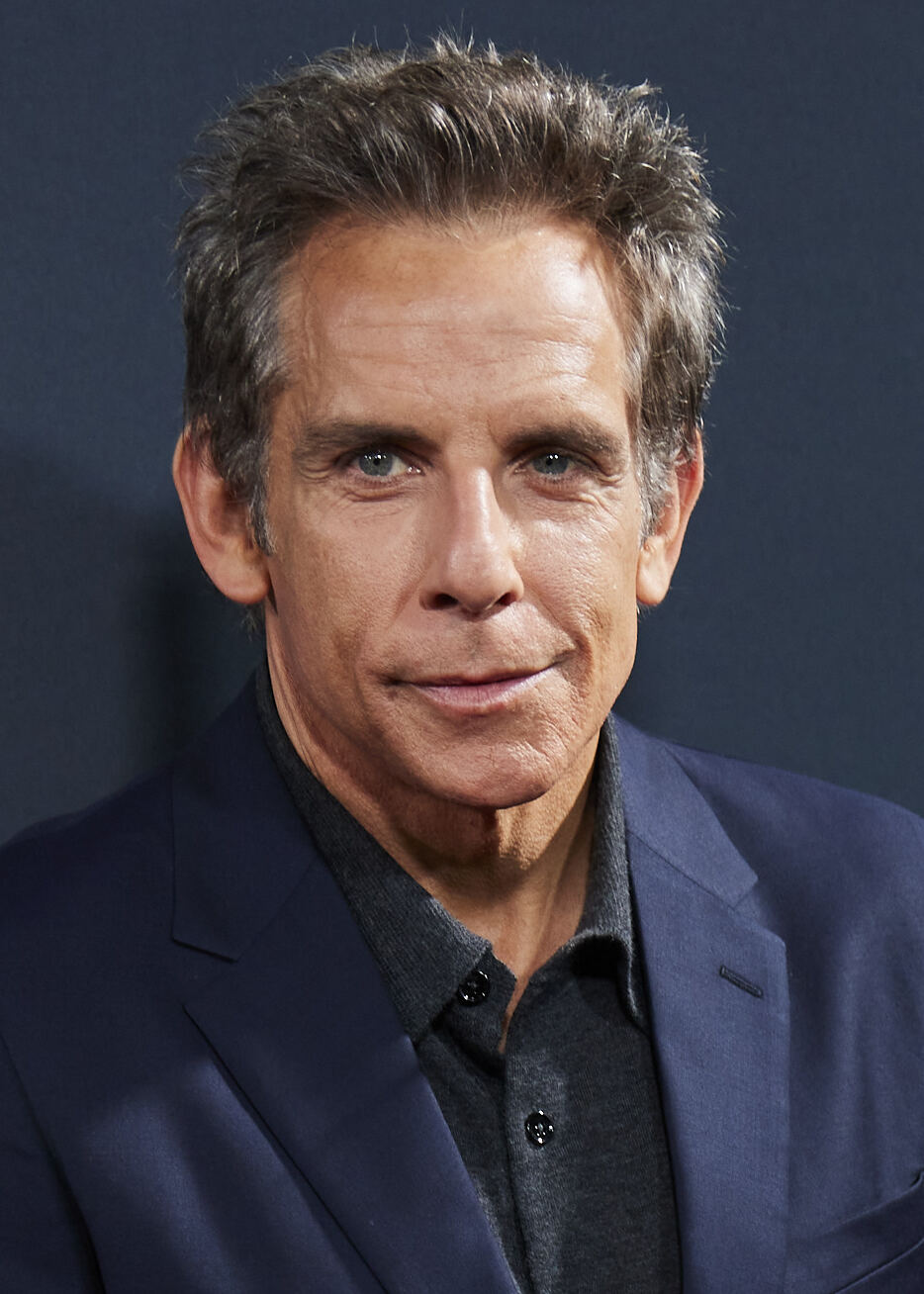
Ben Stiller voices Garth Motherloving in "Sweets and Sour Marge"

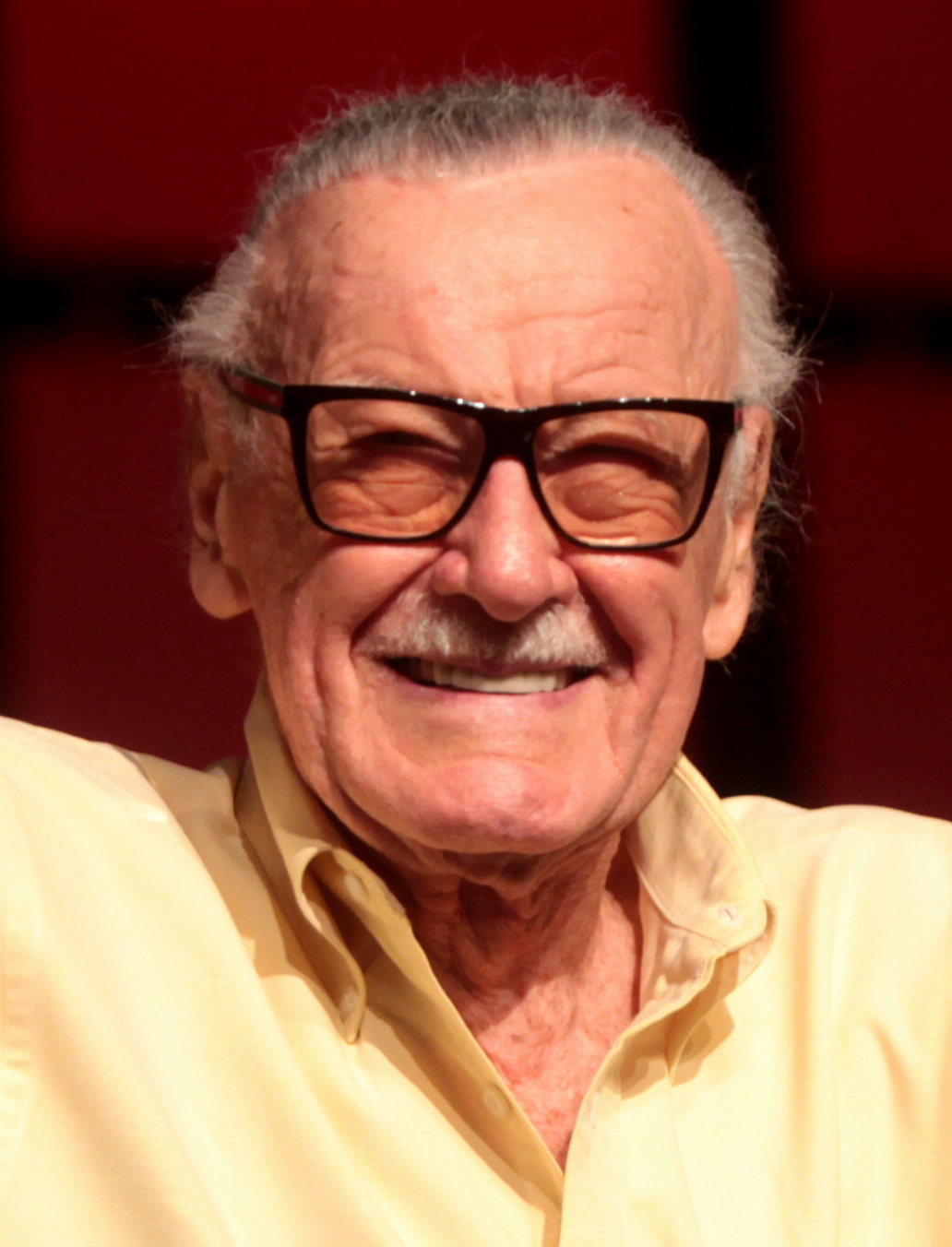
Marvel comics creator Stan Lee voices himself in "I Am Furious (Yellow)"

=== Main cast ===
- Dan Castellaneta as Homer Simpson, Leprechaun, Kodos, Bill, Snake, Hans Moleman, Barney Gumble, Sideshow Mel, Krusty the Clown, Louie, Benjamin, Count Dracula, Rich Texan, Groundskeeper Willie, Grampa Simpson, Mayor Quimby, Gil Gunderson, Blue-Haired Lawyer, Yes Guy, Itchy, Santa's Little Helper, Arnie Pye and various others
- Julie Kavner as Marge Simpson, Patty Bouvier, Selma Bouvier and various others
- Nancy Cartwright as Bart Simpson, Nelson Muntz, Kearney, Todd Flanders, Ralph Wiggum and various others
- Yeardley Smith as Lisa Simpson
- Hank Azaria as Moe Szyslak, Carl Carlson, Kang, Professor Frink, Chief Wiggum, Kirk Van Houten, Lou, Captain McCallister, Cletus Spuckler, Doug, Comic Book Guy, Dr. Nick Riviera, Bumblebee Man, Apu, Disco Stu, Drederick Tatum, Duffman, Luigi Risotto, Johnny Tightlips and various others
- Harry Shearer as Mr. Burns, Waylon Smithers, Lenny Leonard, Principal Skinner, Marty, Ned Flanders, Judge Snyder, Kent Brockman, Eddie, Gary, Reverend Lovejoy, Dr. Hibbert, Otto Mann, Rainier Wolfcastle, Scratchy, Principal Dondelinger and various others.

=== Recurring ===
- Pamela Hayden as Milhouse Van Houten, Jimbo Jones, Ginger Flanders, Rod Flanders and various others
- Tress MacNeille as Lindsey Naegle, Dolph, Amber Simpson, Agnes Skinner and various others
- Marcia Mitzman Gaven as Miss Hoover and various others
- Russi Taylor as Martin Prince and Sherri and Terri
- Karl Wiedergott as additional characters

=== Guest stars ===
- Jane Kaczmarek as Judge Constance Harm
  (2 episodes)
- Joe Mantegna as Fat Tony
  (2 episodes)
- Marcia Wallace as Edna Krabappel
  (5 episodes)
- Pierce Brosnan as Ultrahouse 3000's Pierce Brosnan voice and himself
  ("Treehouse of Horror XII")
- Matthew Perry as Ultrahouse 3000's Matthew Perry voice
  ("Treehouse of Horror XII")
- Jess Harnell as Poncho the Seal
  ("The Parent Rap")
- R.E.M. as themselves
  ("Homer the Moe")
- Julia Louis-Dreyfus as Gloria
  ("A Hunka Hunka Burns in Love")
- George Takei as the waiter
  ("A Hunka Hunka Burns in Love")
- Paul Newman as himself
  ("The Blunder Years")
- Judith Owen as herself
  ("The Blunder Years")
- Richard Gere as himself
  ("She of Little Faith")
- Delroy Lindo as Gabriel
  ("Brawl in the Family")
- Ben Stiller as Garth Motherloving
  ("Sweets and Sour Marge")
- Jon Lovitz as Artie Ziff
  ("Half-Decent Proposal")
- Wolfgang Puck as himself
  ("The Bart Wants What It Wants")
- Reese Witherspoon as Greta
  ("The Bart Wants What It Wants")
- Dennis Weaver as Buck McCoy
  ("The Lastest Gun in the West")
- Frank Welker as Dog
  ("The Lastest Gun in the West")
- Olympia Dukakis as Zelda
  ("The Old Man and the Key")
- Bill Saluga as Ray Jay Johnson
  ("The Old Man and the Key")
- Phish as themselves
  ("Weekend at Burnsie's")
- Stan Lee as himself
  ("I Am Furious (Yellow)")
- James Lipton as himself
  ("The Sweetest Apu")
- Robert Pinsky as himself
  ("Little Girl in the Big Ten")
- Carmen Electra as herself
  ("The Frying Game")
- Frances Sternhagen as Mrs. Bellamy
  ("The Frying Game")

== Release ==
=== Critical reception ===
Some critics felt season 13 was an improvement over the previous Scully seasons. On review aggregator site Rotten Tomatoes, the season has an 86% approval rating. DVDDizzy rhetorically asked how the season "stand[s] up for someone just looking to jump into a full, semi-recent year of episodes", answering "Pretty darn well". It explained "Nearly everything that makes "The Simpsons" what it is can be found here. Most important is the large cast of Springfield residents used to perfection...Clearly, real thought and lots of it goes into each episode's creation", and added "it's almost miraculous how fresh and sharp "The Simpsons" remains in its thirteenth year on air". The site explained "Not every moment here is brilliant. After a rocky start, the season really hits its groove a few episodes in. Even though jokes don't always land, there are guaranteed to be at least a few amusing moments per episode. The stylings haven't changed all that much. There are tasteful homages and cultural references, including loving parodies of classic movies, television, and literature [and] as usual, tons of famous guest stars lend their voices, some as themselves and others as fictional characters". Adam Rayner of WhatCulture wrote that "Season thirteen represents a time when the show was clinging to the classic humour that was derived from situations that were rooted in a reality—albeit a heightened reality—which could happen to you and your family, while slowly descending into the surreal and farcical." Matt Wheeldon of GoodFilmGuide said "the 13th Season another solid, and fairly memorable, effort from the world's best loved cartoon; even if it isn't the be all and end all of Simpsons cartooning. DVD Talk's Ryan Keefer gave a season 3.5/5 stars and said "While Jean might not have brought things to previous glory, he certainly righted the ship in Season 13." Blu-Ray.com gave season 13 a 3.5/5 and Casey Broadwater's sentiment was "The hit-to-miss ratio is much better here than in the previous three seasons, and while the episodes are never quite as hilarious as the Simpsons of old—from way back in the early 1990s—season 13 does mark a turning point for the series." Ron Martin of 411 Mania was more critical giving the season a 6.5/10. Part of the verdict was "Season 13 is representative of the chaotic scatterbrained nature the show would take on from here on out." Casey Burchby of DVD Talk gave the season a 3/5 and wrote "the thirteenth season is further proof of the regrettable change in comic tone that the series took on in the early part of the last decade."

=== Awards and nominations ===
In 2002, The Simpsons won its eleventh consecutive Annie Award for Best Animated Television Production.

"She of Little Faith" was nominated for the Primetime Emmy Award for Outstanding Animated Program (For Programming less than One Hour). The song "Ode to Branson" from "The Old Man and the Key" by Alf Clausen and Jon Vitti was nominated for Outstanding Individual Achievement in Music and Lyrics. "Brawl in the Family" was nominated for the Environmental Media Award for Best Television Episodic Comedy. Three episodes were nominated for the Writers Guild of America Award in the animation category: "Blame It on Lisa" (written by Bob Bendetson), "The Bart Wants What It Wants" (written by John Frink and Don Payne) and "Jaws Wired Shut" (written by Matt Selman). The award was won by the Futurama episode "Godfellas". It marked the only time since the introduction of the category that a show other than The Simpsons won the award.

In 2003, the show was the first and only animated program to be nominated for a Golden Globe Award, for Best Television Series – Musical or Comedy, which it lost to Curb Your Enthusiasm.

== Episodes ==
No. overall	No. in season	Title	Directed by	Written by	Original release date	Prod. code	U.S. viewers (millions)
270	1	"Treehouse of Horror XII"	Jim Reardon	Joel H. Cohen	November 6, 2001	CABF19	13.04
270	1	"Treehouse of Horror XII"	Jim Reardon	John Frink & Don Payne	November 6, 2001	CABF19	13.04
270	1	"Treehouse of Horror XII"	Jim Reardon	Carolyn Omine	November 6, 2001	CABF19	13.04
In the twelfth Treehouse of Horror episode: Hex and the City – While on a day trip through Ethnictown, Homer's bumbling catches the ire of a gypsy, who curses Homer's family and friends into receiving nothing but bad luck. House of Whacks – In this mixed parody of Demon Seed and 2001: A Space Odyssey, Marge buys an automated house and customizes it with the Pierce Brosnan personality, who falls for Marge and attempts to murder Homer. Wiz Kids – In this Harry Potter parody, Bart and Lisa go to a school for wizards, and Lord Montemort (Mr. Burns) uses Bart to capture Lisa's magic.
271	2	"The Parent Rap"	Mark Kirkland	George Meyer & Mike Scully	November 11, 2001	CABF22	14.91
Bart gets in trouble for joyriding in a police car, but feels confident he will be let off by Judge Snyder. However, Snyder goes on vacation before ruling his verdict and is replaced with a coldhearted judge named Constance Harm. She accuses Homer of being a negligent father and sentences him to be tethered to Bart. The two are against it at first but later start to bond. Marge however is unable to take anymore of it and slices the tether off of them both. Homer and Marge then go after Judge Harm only to end up sinking her houseboat. Eventually Bart decides to take punishment and is about to be sentenced to 5 years in juvenile hall, but Judge Snyder returns and dismisses Harm.
272	3	"Homer the Moe"	Jen Kamerman	Dana Gould	November 18, 2001	CABF20	14.44
Moe becomes depressed and decides to return to bartending school so he can re-evaluate himself. He meets an old teacher, who suggests that Moe try improving his bar, which might make him happier. Moe takes the advice, and turns his bar into a trendy nightclub, which does not sit well with his regular customers Homer, Lenny, Carl and Barney.
273	4	"A Hunka Hunka Burns in Love"	Lance Kramer	John Swartzwelder	December 2, 2001	CABF18	13.38
Homer becomes a fortune cookie writer for a Chinatown restaurant. Mr. Burns reads one of Homer's fortunes, which says that the reader will find love before Flag Day is over. Burns goes searching for love and meets Gloria, a meter maid, and asks her out. Gloria reluctantly agrees, and Burns recruits Homer to help him look young and hip to his new girlfriend.
274	5	"The Blunder Years"	Steven Dean Moore	Ian Maxtone-Graham	December 9, 2001	CABF21	12.93
After tricking Marge into thinking an advertising spokesman is coming to visit her, Homer takes Marge and the rest of the family to a restaurant. A hypnotist uses his powers on Homer, and makes him remember a horrific childhood incident where Homer found a dead body in a ravine. The Simpson family decides to investigate this and find out where the body came from.
275	6	"She of Little Faith"	Steven Dean Moore	Bill Freiberger	December 16, 2001	DABF02	13.18
After Homer and Bart's model rocket damages the church, Mr. Burns makes a deal to commercialize the church in return for paying for the damages. Lisa becomes disgusted at what the church has become, so she decides to find a new religion suitable for her. She eventually converts to Buddhism, causing Marge to fear for Lisa's soul. Although the family tries to tempt her, she learns that she can respect other religions while also being a Buddhist.
276	7	"Brawl in the Family"	Matthew Nastuk	Joel H. Cohen	January 6, 2002	DABF01	11.83
A social worker is assigned to make the Simpson family functional after they get arrested for fighting while playing Monopoly. He helps them learn how to work together and function as a family. The moment is ruined when Ginger and Amber, the barmaids who married Homer and Flanders while they were drunk in "Viva Ned Flanders", arrive at the Simpsons' home, which outrages Marge.
277	8	"Sweets and Sour Marge"	Mark Kirkland	Carolyn Omine	January 20, 2002	DABF03	12.27
Springfield is officially declared the World's Fattest Town after an attempt to break a world record lands everyone on top of a truck scale. Out of embarrassment and disgust, Marge goes on a crusade against the local sugar corporation. However, when sugar is banned, Homer, Bart, Mr. Burns and Apu start bootlegging sugar. When Marge sees what is happening, she asks Homer to drop the sugar from the ship into the harbor. Although he relents, the residents jump into the harbor to drink the sugar water, leading to the end of the sugar ban. Note: This episode was dedicated to Ron Taylor the voice of Bleeding Gums Murphy.
278	9	"Jaws Wired Shut"	Nancy Kruse	Matt Selman	January 27, 2002	DABF05	14.24
A jaw injury from colliding with a new town statue turns Homer into a better listener while recuperating with his jaws wired shut, but once the wires come off, Homer does not go back to being loud and obnoxious and Marge becomes starved for thrills, so she joins the demolition derby. When things become dangerous, Homer goes to save her, and she make him promise to be more adventurous so she does not have to be the adventurous one.
279	10	"Half-Decent Proposal"	Lauren MacMullan	Tim Long	February 10, 2002	DABF04	13.23
Homer develops a snoring problem, so Marge decides to spend a night with her sisters Patty and Selma. After a night of drinking, Marge sees a news report about her ex-prom date Artie Ziff, who is now very wealthy, and decides to send him an e-mail. Artie is still obsessed with Marge, so he offers the Simpsons $1 million in exchange for Marge spending a weekend with him.
280	11	"The Bart Wants What It Wants"	Mike Frank Polcino	John Frink & Don Payne	February 17, 2002	DABF06	11.17
Bart befriends Rainier Wolfcastle's daughter Greta. She has a crush on Bart, but he does not seem to realize it and eventually stops seeing her. Seeking revenge, Greta begins dating Bart's best friend Milhouse, which causes Bart to start missing her. She leaves for Toronto with her father, and Bart convinces his family to follow them there. Bart and Milhouse fight, and when Greta forces them to choose, they both decline her.
281	12	"The Lastest Gun in the West"	Bob Anderson	John Swartzwelder	February 24, 2002	DABF07	13.17
While running away from a vicious dog, Bart meets Buck McCoy, a former Western film star. Bart begins hanging out with him and starts to idolize him. Bart wants to help McCoy stage a comeback, so he convinces all of the kids in town to become interested in the Wild West. McCoy then appears on the Krusty the Clown Show, but the comeback flops when Buck begins drinking again and injures Krusty.
282	13	"The Old Man and the Key"	Lance Kramer	Jon Vitti	March 10, 2002	DABF09	14.46
Grampa falls in love with Zelda, a woman who has an interest in men who can drive. He decides to get his driver's license back, but ignores Homer and Marge's concerns that she is only using him for his car. When he crashes Homer's car and Homer takes his keys, Zelda goes on a trip with Grampa's rival, Zack. Grampa and Bart steal Marge's car to go to Zelda, but Grampa declares that she was only using him, and he reconciles with Homer.
283	14	"Tales from the Public Domain"	Mike B. Anderson	Andrew Kreisberg	March 17, 2002	DABF08	11.69
283	14	"Tales from the Public Domain"	Mike B. Anderson	Josh Lieb	March 17, 2002	DABF08	11.69
283	14	"Tales from the Public Domain"	Mike B. Anderson	Matt Warburton	March 17, 2002	DABF08	11.69
When Homer gets a notice from the library that he has a book of classic tales that is years overdue, he finds it on the shelf and reads three stories: The Odyssey (where Homer and his bar buddies try to get home after fighting the Trojans), Joan of Arc (where Lisa leads the French against the English with the help of God), and Hamlet (where Bart tries to kill Moe after Moe kills Homer in order to marry Marge).
284	15	"Blame It on Lisa"	Steven Dean Moore	Bob Bendetson	March 31, 2002	DABF10	11.12
When Homer gets the family's telephone service cut off for refusing to pay for calls made to Rio de Janeiro, Brazil, Lisa confesses that she was the one who called Rio after sponsoring an orphan who goes missing. She convinces the family to travel to Brazil to look for him. However, once there, they have no luck finding him, and Homer is kidnapped. They find the orphan, who now has a high-paying job and gives money to pay for Homer's ransom. They use the money to rescue Homer.
285	16	"Weekend at Burnsie's"	Michael Marcantel	Jon Vitti	April 7, 2002	DABF11	12.49
Homer is prescribed medicinal marijuana after getting pecked in the eyes by a murder of crows. While his family and friends worry about the drug altering his personality, Homer becomes Mr. Burns's vice president after cracking up at Burns' antiquated jokes. However, medical marijuana is outlawed, and Homer stops using it. When Homer gives Smithers his last joint to laugh at Burns' jokes, he accidentally lets Burns drown in the bathtub. Because he needs to make a speech to save the power plant, Homer and Smithers move his body like a puppet, which impresses the investors and also restarts Burns' heart.
286	17	"Gump Roast"	Mark Kirkland	Deb Lacusta & Dan Castellaneta	April 21, 2002	DABF12	12.26
In this clip show episode, Homer is honored at a Friars' Club Roast. A number of characters show up to roast him, but the celebrating is interrupted by Kang and Kodos, who say that humanity will be judged based on Homer's experiences. They probe Maggie's brain and are moved by what they see, so they spare humanity in exchange for awards show tickets.
287	18	"I Am Furious (Yellow)"	Chuck Sheetz	John Swartzwelder	April 28, 2002	DABF13	13.38
Inspired by a cartoonist who speaks at the school as part of a career day assembly, Bart creates a comic book series based on Homer and his anger problems, which turns into a popular Internet cartoon series called Angry Dad. Homer finds out about this and is at first outraged, but after talking to his family, he decides to try to become a less angry person.
288	19	"The Sweetest Apu"	Matthew Nastuk	John Swartzwelder	May 5, 2002	DABF14	11.83
Homer and Marge discover that Apu is having an affair with the Squishee delivery lady at the Kwik-E-Mart. They decide to keep Apu's wife Manjula from finding out about it. However, she eventually learns of Apu's affair by watching store security tapes. She throws Apu out of the house and decides to file for divorce, but soon realizes that she misses him.
289	20	"Little Girl in the Big Ten"	Lauren MacMullan	Jon Vitti	May 12, 2002	DABF15	11.23
Lisa tries to fit in with two college students by lying about her age. She finds that the college atmosphere is perfect for her, but her lie is soon discovered and she is shunned by her fellow elementary school students. Meanwhile, Bart is diagnosed with a weakened immune system after getting bitten by a Chinese mosquito and must live in a plastic, germ-free bubble.
290	21	"The Frying Game"	Mike Frank Polcino	John Swartzwelder	May 19, 2002	DABF16	10.79
While faced with community service for abusing an endangered insect, Homer begins assisting an elderly woman named Mrs. Bellamy. When Mrs. Bellamy is murdered one night by a robber, Homer and Marge are the ones suspected for committing the crime. When the police find Bellamy's necklace in their home, they are arrested. To save Marge, Homer says he committed the murder and is sentenced to be executed. At his execution, it is revealed he is on Fox's new reality show that frames people for crimes, and Bellamy is revealed to be Carmen Electra.
291	22	"Poppa's Got a Brand New Badge"	Pete Michels	Dana Gould	May 22, 2002	DABF17	8.18
Homer starts a security company with Lenny and Carl after the police are ineffective during a blackout, and eventually Mayor Quimby decides to have them replace the police. Homer finds that he excels at the job, but then he runs afoul of mob boss Fat Tony, who threatens Homer with death unless he leaves town. With no one willing to protect Homer, the mob comes to his house to kill him when someone starts shooting at the mobsters, and they leave. Homer gives his police powers back to Chief Wiggum, and it is revealed that Maggie protected Homer.

== Blu-ray and DVD release ==
The DVD and Blu-ray box set for season thirteen was released by 20th Century Fox Home Entertainment in the United States and Canada on Tuesday, August 24, 2010, eight years after it had completed broadcast on television. As well as every episode from the season, the Blu-ray and DVD releases feature bonus material including deleted scenes, animatics, and commentaries for every episode. The box art features Ralph Wiggum, and a special limited-edition "embossed head case" package was also released. The Blu-ray set is also available on Region 4. In Region 2, the set is only available on DVD.

The Complete Thirteenth Season
Set details			Special features
22 episodes; 3-disc set (Blu-ray); 4-disc set (DVD); 1.33:1 aspect ratio; AUDIO (DVD); English 5.1 Dolby Digital; Spanish 2.0 Dolby Surround; French 2.0 Dolby Surround; AUDIO (Blu-ray); English 5.1 DTS-HD Master Audio; Spanish 5.1 Dolby Digital; French 5.1 Dolby Digital; SUBTITLES; English SDH; Spanish			Introduction from Matt Groening; Optional commentaries for all 22 episodes; Animation Showcases; The Parent Rap; Sweets and Sour Marge; Deleted Scenes; Treehouse of Horror XII; The Parent Rap; A Hunka Hunka Burns in Love; The Blunder Years; She of Little Faith; Sweets and Sour Marge; Half-Decent Proposal; The Bart Wants What It Wants; The Lastest Gun in the West; The Old Man and the Key; Tales from the Public Domain; I Am Furious (Yellow); The Sweetest Apu; Little Girl in the Big Ten; The Frying Game; Special Language Feature; Treehouse of Horror XII; Portuguese 2.0 Dolby Surround; Czech 2.0 Dolby Surround; Japanese 2.0 Dolby Surround; German 2.0 Dolby Surround; Featurettes; Ralphisms"; "The People Ball"; "The 13th Crewman"; "Blame it on the Monkeys"; "The Games"; "The Sweet Life of Ralph"; Sketch Galleries; Commercials; Burger King - Lines Man; Burger King - Trick or Treat; Burger King - Springfield Hamburger; Burger King - Simpsons Watch; Sabritas
Release dates
Region 1	Region 2	Region 4	
Tuesday, August 24, 2010	Monday, September 20, 2010	Wednesday, December 1, 2010	
