= The Lastest Gun in the West =

- The Simpsons episode
- Episode no.: Season 13; Episode 12
- Directed by: Bob Anderson
- Written by: John Swartzwelder
- Production code: DABF07
- Original air date: February 24, 2002

Guest appearances
- Dennis Weaver as Buck McCoy; Frank Welker as Dog

Episode features
- Chalkboard gag: "Making Milhouse cry is not a science project"
- Couch gag: The Simpsons find the Squeaky-voiced Teen making out with a girl on the couch.
- Commentary: Al Jean; Max Pross; Joel H. Cohen; Matt Warburton; David Silverman

Episode chronology
← Previous "The Bart Wants What It Wants"	Next → "The Old Man and the Key"
- The Simpsons season 13

"The Lastest Gun in the West" is the twelfth episode of the thirteenth season of the American animated television series The Simpsons. It first aired on the Fox network in the United States on February 24, 2002. In the episode, Bart meets a retired Western star named Buck McCoy who soon becomes his idol. After McCoy shows the Simpsons some of his films, they help him revive his acting career.

The episode was directed by Bob Anderson and written by John Swartzwelder, who based the script on a story idea pitched by fellow Simpsons writer Ron Hauge. The episode features Dennis Weaver as the retired Western actor Buck McCoy, Frank Welker as the vicious dog, and Karl Wiedergott as an alcoholic resembling Walter Brennan.

When it was first broadcast, "The Lastest Gun in the West" was seen by 5.9% of the American population between ages 18 and 49. It has garnered mixed reviews from critics.

== Plot ==
When a vicious dog chases Bart on his way home from school, he takes refuge behind the gates of an estate belonging to retired Western film star Buck McCoy. After Buck shows Bart a trick to calm the dog and gives him a tour of his large, Western memorabilia-filled house, Bart becomes a fan of his cowboy character and lifestyle. He starts dressing and talking like a cowboy, including at school, where he sparks a craze for all things Western. Naturally, Homer learns about Bart's new idol and is jealous that Bart doesn't look up to him in the same way.

Hoping to introduce him to a new generation of kids and revive Buck's career, Bart lands him a guest spot on Krusty the Clown's show to demonstrate his old gun-slinging and trick shooting skills. Although he performs flawlessly in rehearsal, Buck grows nervous about performing in front of a large television audience and gets drunk before the show, making a fool of himself and accidentally shooting Krusty live on air. Buck confesses that he has a drinking problem, but Bart is crushed and declares Buck is no longer his hero. Marge and Homer try to help Buck overcome his alcoholism by discarding all the liquor in his house (including a painting made entirely from whiskey) and enrolling him in an Alcoholics Anonymous program. Buck walks away from rehab, saying he's too old to change his ways, and chides the Simpsons for not minding their own business.

When Homer sees a breaking news report about a police stand-off with a gang of heavily-armed robbers at the National Bank of Springfield, he convinces Buck that he can save the day and become a hero again. Tossing his old whiskey flask (and some other drug paraphernalia) in the trash, a sober Buck summons the courage to confront the robbers and disarms them using his trick roping skills. Bart's faith in his hero is restored and, after acknowledging everything Homer has done, Bart declares him a hero, too. Buck is appreciative of the opportunity to redeem himself, but tells Bart never to bother him again. Buck returns home contentedly to do chores, and as the episode ends, Bart is again chased past Buck's house by the vicious dog.

== Production ==
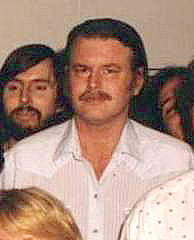
John Swartzwelder wrote the episode.

”The Lastest Gun in the West” was written by John Swartzwelder and directed by Bob Anderson. It was first broadcast on the Fox network in the United States on February 24, 2002.

=== Writing ===
The idea for the episode was pitched by Simpsons writer Ron Hauge, who thought it would be interesting to see an episode in which Bart would run into a retired Western film star in the neighborhood and "think he was the coolest guy in the world", although the actor had seen better days. Hauge suggested that Swartzwelder, who is an avid Western fan, would be the appropriate writer for the episode. Swartzwelder also pitched the plot idea about the angry dog who chases Bart in the episode.

=== Animation ===
The design for Buck McCoy was primarily based on Dennis Weaver, who portrayed him in the episode, as well as aspects of other western actors such as Roy Rogers and John Wayne. McCoy's costume in the fictional television show McTrigger was based on the attire worn by the main character in real-life television series McCloud. The design for the dog went through several different model changes until the Simpsons staff settled on the "very angry bull-terrier design" seen in the episode. A scene in the episode shows McCoy showcasing an array of films he starred in to the Simpson family through a movie projector. In order to achieve the strobe light effect done by the projector, the animators painted every other frame white and then blank.

=== Casting ===
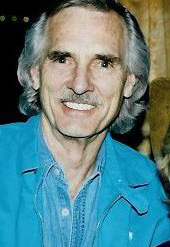
Dennis Weaver portrayed Buck McCoy in the episode.

The episode features American actor Dennis Weaver, famous for his role in the television show Gunsmoke, in a guest role as the Western actor Buck McCoy. Al Jean, the show runner for the episode, stated in the DVD commentary that Weaver was very funny, a ”terrific guy”, and that it was an honor to meet him. Karl Wiedergott, an actor who usually fills in for unavailable male cast members during table reads for The Simpsons episodes, portrayed a recovering alcoholic gold miner resembling Walter Brennan. The dog was played by voice artist Frank Welker.

== Cultural references ==
The episode title is a pun based on the term "the fastest gun in the west," and there are numerous references to, and parodies of, classic Hollywood westerns, cowboy characters, music, and themes throughout the episode. In the scene where McCoy rehearses for his appearance on the Krusty the Clown show, he shoots a Krusty cardboard cutout repeatedly in the crotch. The scene is a reference to an incident on The Tonight Show Starring Johnny Carson, in which Ed Ames hit a mannequin in the crotch while demonstrating a tomahawk throw. Carson's quips during the incident are referenced in Krusty's line "Ooh, right in the panhandle." The interior of McCoy's house is loosely based on the inside of Will Rogers' house in Will Rogers State Historic Park. "McTrigger", the last TV series McCoy starred in, is a parody of the 1970's American television police drama McCloud, in which Weaver played the lead; McCoy bitterly observes that all it seems his character did was "shoot hippies," so he was eventually written out and the series retooled as Room 222, a show created by Simpsons producer James L. Brooks set in an inner-city high school. In one scene, Homer shows Bart a poster of himself dressed as Farrah Fawcett in her iconic red swimsuit poster. The rehab center where Buck goes, the John Ford Center for Alcoholic Cowboys, is a nod to both film director John Ford, as well as the Betty Ford Center, an addiction treatment facility in Rancho Mirage, California famous for a long list of celebrity patients over the years.

== Release ==
In its original American broadcast on February 24, 2002, "The Lastest Gun In the West", along with a rerun of Malcolm in the Middle, put Fox in second place for the night among adults between ages 18 and 49. According to Nielsen Media Research, the episode received a 5.9 rating, meaning it was seen by 5.9% of the population in said demographic. On August 24, 2010, the episode was released as part of The Simpsons: The Thirteenth Season DVD and Blu-ray set.

Following its television broadcast, "The Lastest Gun in the West" received a lot of negative feedback from The Simpsons fans. The Simpsons staff — who, according to Jean, are susceptible to criticism — were surprised by the amount of scorn the fans showed towards the episode. Jean, who thought the episode was "great", stated in the DVD commentary for the episode that he "[has] never been able to quite figure [why the fans disliked the episode] out", and speculated that, since Westerns have not been popular since the 1960s, "they [The Simpsons fans] just don't care about them at all."

Following the home video release of the thirteenth season of The Simpsons, reviews of "The Lastest Gun in the West" were mixed.

On the negative side, describing the episode as a "clunker", Jennifer Malkowski of DVD Verdict stated that the episode is "frightfully thin" and criticized the premise as being "lazy".

Nate Boss of Project:Blu criticized the premise as well, writing that the episode was "just a couple jokes thrown together" rather than a complete story.

Writing for Blu-ray.com, Casey Broadwater described the episode as being "just plain dull".

However, Colin Jacobson of DVD Movie Guide praised the episode as "offer[ing] good laughs" and wrote that, while the episode was not "brilliant", it was overall "an enjoyable experience."

Giving the episode a positive review as well, Ron Martin of 411Mania described the episode as being "easily one of the best of the season".
