= The Bart Wants What It Wants =

- The Simpsons episode
- Episode no.: Season 13; Episode 11
- Directed by: Michael Polcino
- Written by: John Frink; Don Payne
- Production code: DABF06
- Original air date: February 17, 2002

Guest appearances
- Wolfgang Puck as himself; Reese Witherspoon as Greta Wolfcastle

Episode features
- Chalkboard gag: "The Giving Tree is not a chump"
- Couch gag: The family and various acrobats form a kickline, which turns the living room into a huge circus extravaganza.
- Commentary: Al Jean; Matt Selman; Tim Long; John Frink; Tom Gammill; Max Pross; Joel H. Cohen; Pamela Hayden; Michael Polcino; Steven Dean Moore; Bill Freiberger

Episode chronology
← Previous "Half-Decent Proposal"	Next → "The Lastest Gun in the West"
- The Simpsons season 13

"The Bart Wants What It Wants" is the eleventh episode of the thirteenth season of the American animated television series The Simpsons. It first aired on the Fox network in the United States on February 17, 2002. In the episode, Bart befriends Rainier Wolfcastle's daughter, Greta. While Greta falls in love with him, Bart only accompanies her because she owns a lot of entertaining things.

"The Bart Wants What It Wants" was written by John Frink and Don Payne while Michael Polcino served as director. Although the episode's first draft was written by Frink and Payne, the idea for the episode was pitched by staff writer Matt Selman. Because the Simpsons visit Toronto in the episode, the Fox network wanted to promote it by having the city of Toronto declare February 17 "The Simpsons day", and award the Simpsons family a key to the city. Because the city does not allow for-profit companies to receive a key, the request was turned down.

"The Bart Wants What It Wants" also features guest stars Reese Witherspoon as Greta and Wolfgang Puck as himself. It also features references to Scrabble, Seinfeld and Whassup?, an advertisement campaign for Budweiser beer.

In its original broadcast, the episode was seen by approximately 6.4 million viewers, finishing in 27th place in the ratings the week it aired.

Following its broadcast, the episode received mixed reviews from critics.

== Plot ==
After Homer steals the Olympic torch because the television broadcast of the sporting event preempted his favorite shows for the last time, the Olympic administrators chase the Simpson family in a helicopter as they flee in their car. When Marge returns the torch, the sight of its flame causes the helicopter to crash. The administrators survive the crash, but the Olympic flame is extinguished.

On their way home, the family go to a private school-held fair, where Bart meets Greta, Rainier Wolfcastle's daughter. Greta develops a crush on the oblivious Bart and the family enjoys the royal treatment Rainier provides them. However, Lisa discovers Bart not taking Greta seriously after he skipped her school dance to watch Principal Skinner bomb at an open mic comedy night. Upon Lisa's advice, Bart breaks up with Greta, who does not take it well.

After losing her, Bart discovers he actually wanted to be with Greta and goes to her house to ask her to come back to him. To his surprise, Greta has started a new relationship with Milhouse. Greta goes to Canada with Milhouse during her father's movie shooting, and Bart follows them with his family. At the set, Bart confronts Milhouse and they fight, ruining everything. They end up in front of Greta and demand for her to choose between them. Greta turns both boys down due to a loss of interest in the two. The boys reconcile and join the Canadian Mounted Basketball Team.

== Production ==
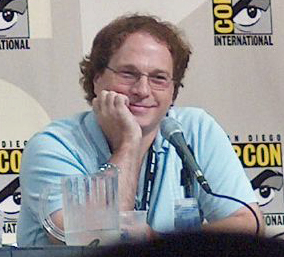
Don Payne (pictured) wrote the episode together with John Frink.

"The Bart Wants What It Wants" was directed by Michael Polcino and written by John Frink and Don Payne. It originally aired on the Fox network in the United States on February 17, 2002. Although the episode was written by Frink and Payne, the idea for the episode was conceived by staff writer Matt Selman, who pitched an episode in which Bart likes a girl because she has "awesome things", while the girl likes him for his personality. Because the Simpsons visit Toronto in the episode, the Fox network decided to promote it as the episode's main focus, even though Canada is not mentioned before the third act. To help promote the episode, Fox requested that the city of Toronto declare February 17, 2002, the day the episode first aired, to be "The Simpsons Day" and award the Simpson family a key to the city. However, the request was turned down because the city does not allow for-profit companies to receive a key. According to executive producer and then-showrunner Al Jean, Fox's request "upset" Canada, and a "sternly worded" editorial in The Toronto Star criticized the network's ways of promoting the episode. The newspaper also credited Canadian The Simpsons staff writers Joel H. Cohen and Tim Long for pitching the episode, but this was refuted in the episode's DVD commentary. While "The Bart Wants What It Wants" features the Simpsons' first travel to Canada, the family would return in two later episodes: season sixteen's "Midnight Rx", where Homer and Grampa visited Winnipeg so they could smuggle cheap medication; and season 21's "Boy Meets Curl", where Marge and Homer travel to Vancouver, so they can participate in the 2010 Winter Olympics.

The beginning of the episode shows the Simpsons being chased by Olympic employees. The scene was included because the staff knew that the episode would air during the 2002 Winter Olympics. In order to avoid a lawsuit from the International Olympic Committee, the animators slightly altered the design of the Olympic rings, which can be seen on Olympic employees' helicopters. At one point in the episode, the Simpsons visit the Springfield Preparatory School fair, where Lisa notices how much more developed the school is in comparison to Springfield Elementary School. Jealous, Springfield Elementary principal Skinner breaks in and steals some school equipment. Shocked, Lisa asks Skinner why he stole the equipment, to which he replies "welcome to Dick Cheney's America". Originally, he would say "welcome to George W. Bush's America", but because none of the series' regular cast members could do an impression of him, and because the staff found it to be in bad taste, they decided to change it. When Lisa scolds Bart for being oblivious to Greta's feelings, he replies "Hey, I didn't lead her on. I always played it light and breezy." The line was written by Frink and, according to Selman, it became very popular with the staff writers, having "stayed with [them] for years". The song that plays while the Simpsons visit the Skydome in Toronto is "Take Off" by the fictional comedy duo Bob and Doug McKenzie, the chorus of which was sung by Geddy Lee, the lead vocalist and bassist of the Canadian rock band Rush. The episode features American actress Reese Witherspoon as Rainier Wolfcastle's daughter, Greta. Jean stated that Witherspoon was "brilliant", and noted that she was "very young-looking". The episode also features Austrian-American celebrity chef Wolfgang Puck as himself.

== Cultural references ==
When first meeting Greta, Milhouse greets her by saying Whassup?. The scene is a reference to an advertisement campaign for the American Budweiser beer, in which several characters are seen calling each other and saying "Whassup?". In Moe's bar, Wolfcastle receives several questions from bar customers, prompting him to send in his "authorized look-alike" to give answers. In the DVD commentary for the episode, Jean stated that the scene was written at a time when celebrity look-alikes were making "excellent livings". At one point in the episode, Bart and Greta are seen playing Scrabble, a word game manufactured by Hasbro. The music cue that plays before and after Skinner's comedy routine is based on the intro music from the American television sitcom Seinfeld. In one scene Bart breaking up with Greta in the Ice Cream Shop is a reference to the Reese Witherspoon movie Legally Blonde when Elle's Boyfriend breaks up with her in a diner.

The episode title is a reference to the common phrase "the heart wants what it wants".

== Release ==
In its original American broadcast, "The Bart Wants What It Wants" received a 6.1 rating, according to Nielsen Media Research, translating to approximately 6.4 million viewers. The episode finished in 27th place in the ratings for the week of February 11–17, 2002, making it the third most watched program on the network.

Later that year, the episode was nominated for a Writers Guild of America Award in the Animation category, but it ultimately lost to the Futurama episode "Godfellas". On August 24, 2010, "The Bart Wants What It Wants" was released as part of The Simpsons: The Complete Thirteenth Season DVD and Blu-ray set. Al Jean, Matt Selman, Tim Long, John Frink, Don Payne, Tom Gammill, Max Pross, Joel H. Cohen, Pamela Hayden, Michael Polcino, Steven Dean Moore and Bill Freiberger participated in the audio commentary of the episode.

Following its broadcast, "The Bart Wants What It Wants" received mixed reviews from critics.

Giving the episode a positive review, Ben Rayner of the Toronto Star wrote, "Fortunately, the episode is on par with this season's best, boasting a reasonably unscattered plotline and, where the main romantic storyline is concerned, a touch of the childlike sweetness Simpsons writers have brought to previous 'crush' episodes."

Although he enjoyed most episodes of the thirteenth season, Colin Jacobson of DVD Movie Guide wrote that "Half-Decent Proposal" and "The Bart Wants What It Wants" "forces [him] to rethink that opinion." He continued, "Like 'Proposal', 'Wants' isn’t a bad program, but it feels stale and rehashed."

Nate Boss of Project-Blu wrote that, while it featured Rainier Wolfcastle, which he considered to be "one of the funniest characters in Simpsons lore," the episode "doesn't tread ground that hasn't been tread a few times before." He continued, "Throw in Canada, and a few Mountie jokes, and bam, you have an episode."

411Mania's Ron Martin also found it to be unoriginal, describing the episode as a "yearly episode just with different tempters each time."

Hannah Sung, also of the Toronto Star, felt the episode was disappointing, writing that it "wasn't entirely bad, but the payoff didn't match the hype". She said that the third act in the city of Toronto was a disappointment and "really just a sloppy amalgamation of every Canadian joke we've ever been told by Americans that lose their punch after the millionth time."
