= A Hunka Hunka Burns in Love =

- The Simpsons episode
- Gloria, (left) played by guest star Julia Louis-Dreyfus, on a Ferris wheel with Mr Burns (right). In order to make Burns look happy, the animators had to change Burns' basic model; note that his eyebrows are not visible in this scene.
- Episode no.: Season 13; Episode 4
- Directed by: Lance Kramer
- Written by: John Swartzwelder
- Production code: CABF18
- Original air date: December 2, 2001

Guest appearances
- Julia Louis-Dreyfus as Gloria; George Takei as the waiter

Episode features
- Chalkboard gag: "Fun does not have a size"
- Couch gag: The Simpsons (dressed in striped prison jumpsuits) tunnel their way to the couch.
- Commentary: Mike Scully; Al Jean; Ian Maxtone-Graham; Matt Selman; Tom Gammill; Max Pross; Lance Kramer

Episode chronology
← Previous "Homer the Moe"	Next → "The Blunder Years"
- The Simpsons season 13

"A Hunka Hunka Burns in Love" is the fourth episode of the thirteenth season of the American animated television series The Simpsons. It first aired on the Fox network on December 2, 2001. In the episode, Mr. Burns falls in love with Gloria, a woman who is much younger than he is and who turns out to be Snake Jailbird's ex-girlfriend.

The episode was written by John Swartzwelder, directed by Lance Kramer and dedicated to the memory of George Harrison. The episode featured, along with George Takei as a waiter and Karl Wiedergott as a delivery boy, Julia Louis-Dreyfus, who appeared as Mr. Burns' love interest Gloria.

The episode received positive reviews from critics following the thirteenth season's release on DVD and Blu-ray. The episode's title is a reference to the line "a hunk, a hunk of burning love" in the Elvis Presley song Burning Love.

== Plot ==
The Simpsons visit a Chinese restaurant, where Homer is hired to write Chinese fortune cookies after complaining that the current fortunes are unimaginative. One of his fortunes says "You will find true love on Flag Day". This cookie makes its way to Mr. Burns on, coincidentally, Flag Day. Eager for true love at last, Burns and a reluctant Smithers spend the evening womanising at a wealthy social gathering and a strip club. With mere minutes left in the day, Burns finds a cop ticketing his car, which he had parked in the middle of the road. After discovering the cop is a beautiful woman named Gloria (voiced by Julia Louis-Dreyfus), Burns asks her out on a date. Gloria warily accepts, much to Burns' delight and Smithers' chagrin.

After a pleasant first date at the carnival, Burns asks about another date but Gloria is about to turn him down when Homer runs by. Burns asks Homer to vouch for him to Gloria, so Homer regales her by listing Burns' many exploits. After Gloria agrees to a second date, Burns enlists Homer to be his "youthful advisor", accompanying the couple on their next date at the disco hall, and even carrying Burns and Gloria up the stairs when they go to have sex. In these cases, Burns overcomes his weakness and extreme age by means of a powerful aphrodisiac (made from an extract of the "pocket fox", a species which only existed for three weeks in the 16th century).

Eventually, during a date at the bowling alley, Burns decides to ask Gloria to marry him. She says yes. As Burns goes off to get some champagne to celebrate, Snake comes to rob the bowling alley, and is surprised to see Gloria, who turns out to be his ex-girlfriend. Despite Gloria's protests, Snake kidnaps her and Homer. When Burns finds Gloria's ring, dropped in the commotion, he assumes she ran off with Homer. Snake takes Gloria and Homer to his hideout. Though Gloria says she loves Burns, Snake vows he can change. The police arrive and confront Snake. Homer tries to escape but instead sets Snake's house on fire. Snake and Homer get out and Burns runs in to save Gloria, however he is soon overcome by the smoke and Gloria is then seen carrying him to safety. Although initially grateful, Gloria begins to reminisce about Snake, causing her to break up with Burns and become Snake's girl again.

== Production ==
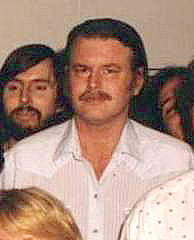
John Swartzwelder wrote the episode.

"A Hunka Hunka Burns in Love" was written by John Swartzwelder while Lance Kramer served as director. It first aired in the United States on December 2, 2001 on the Fox network.

=== Writing ===
Mike Scully, who worked as an executive producer and show runner for the episode, stated in the episode's DVD audio commentary that the first thing the writers tried to think of while writing the episode was how the Simpson family would fit into the story. In the episode's first draft, Gloria worked as a food truck driver; however, this was later changed so that she instead worked as a police lady. Scully also stated that, in the scene after Homer carries Burns and Gloria up the stairs, there were originally a lot of jokes about Homer "taking care of business" for Burns; however, the staff decided to leave it out since it would make Homer "unlikable." In the episode, Snake Jailbird's mailbox reads "Snake (Jailbird)" which is a reference to a debate that the writers had over whether Snake's mailbox would read "Snake" or "Jailbird". Originally, the episode would end with Burns taking the "pocket fox" extract, however when seeing the animatic, the writers felt that that ending would be "too slow", so they changed it into Gloria falling in love with Snake again.

=== Animation ===
On the DVD audio commentary for the episode, Kramer stated that there was an issue over which color to paint the fortunes with. Kramer wanted the fortunes to be white while one of his co-workers suggested they should be pink. Kramer stated that the co-worker had been to a Chinese restaurant close to the studio that had pink fortunes, and that "that's why she [colored the fortunes pink]." The animators also found it difficult to draw Mr Burns happy. Kramer stated that Burns was "designed to look like a vulture" and look "evil all the time", so in order to make Burns look happy and more sympathetic, the animators had to change some things in Burns' regular model. For example, Burns' eyebrows are not visible through the majority of the episode. The scene with Mr Burns and Gloria on the Ferris wheel was difficult to animate as well, since the animators had to "keep everything moving to sell it." In the scene in which Snake's house is burning down, the animators chose to color the sky red, in order to reflect the fire as well as make the scene "a little more exciting."

=== Casting ===
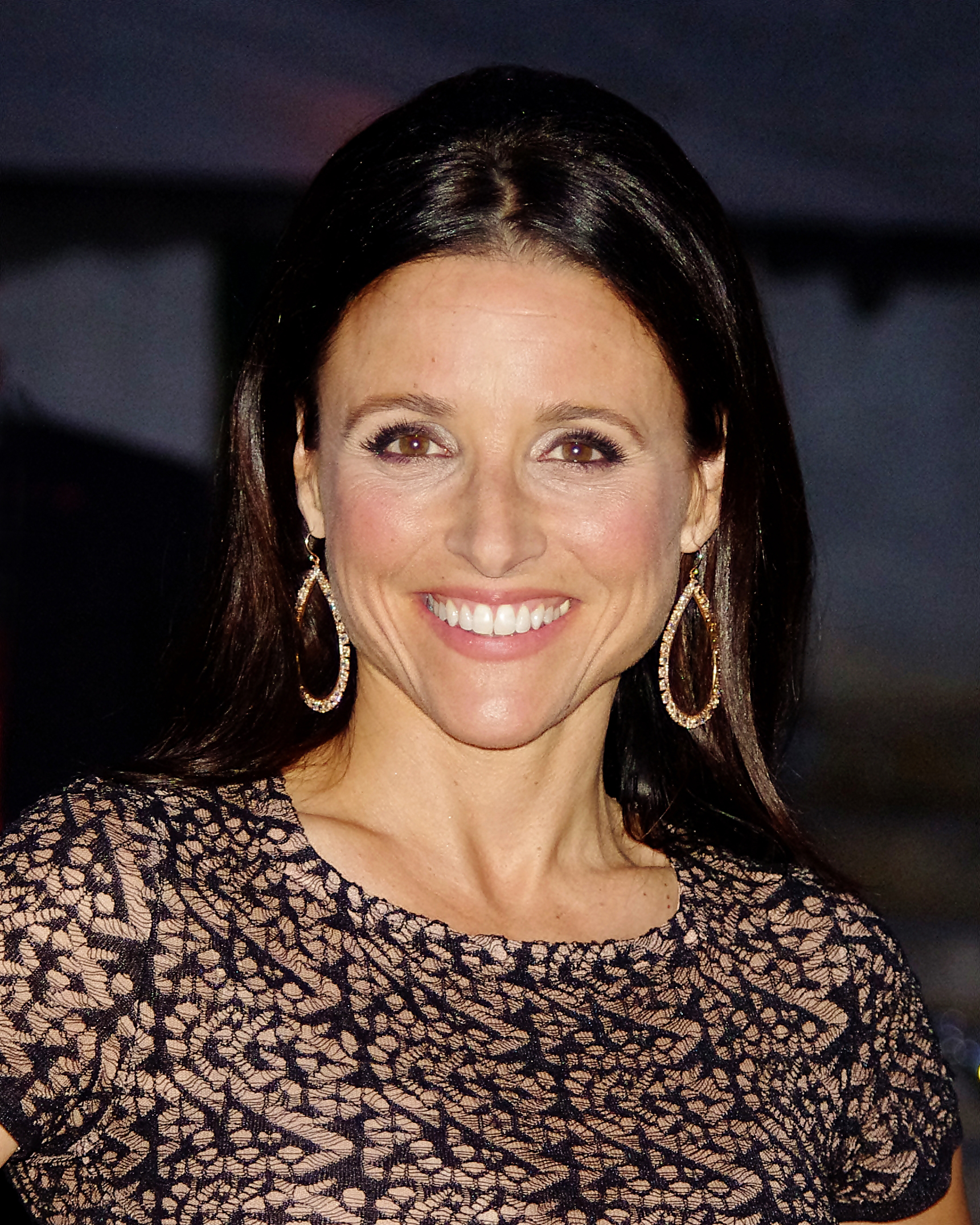
Julia Louis-Dreyfus guest-starred as Gloria in the episode.

Julia Louis-Dreyfus guest-starred as Gloria in the episode. In the DVD audio commentary for the episode, current show runner Al Jean stated that working with Louis-Dreyfus was "an absolute pleasure", stating that "not only was she funny but you'd give her, like, one suggestion, and she'd do three great things with it." The waiter in the Chinese restaurant was portrayed by actor George Takei. Dan Castellaneta, who plays Homer among several characters on the show, supplied the voice for Woody Allen, who is seen in a writing room for fortune cookies, wondering what he's doing there. The delivery boy was portrayed by Karl Wiedergott, a voice actor who usually fills in for the male actors on The Simpsons when they are not available for the table read. Jean described him as "versatile" and "very talented".

== Release ==
Following the release of thirteenth season of The Simpsons on DVD and Blu-ray on August 24, 2010, "A Hunka Hunka Burns in Love" received positive reviews from critics.

Writing for Project:Blu, Nate Boss was favorable, describing it as "A hilarious episode, with some fantastic one liners", and went on to say that the episode was "so far the best in the season."

Ron Martin of 411Mania was also positive towards the episode, writing "The antics of Mr. Burns and Homer trying to woo a young police officer are at worst amusing, at most hilarious." He wrote that Snake Jailbird was "a welcome side character", and went on to write that the episode was the best of the first disc of The Simpsons' thirteenth season on DVD.

Jennifer Malkowski of DVD Verdict gave the episode a B+ rating, and wrote that the episodes highlights were "Burns' reaction walking into a strip club" [sic] and "a fortune cookie Homer writes, 'You will be aroused by a shampoo commercial'."

Colin Jacobsson, writing for DVD Movie Guide, stated that, while it was not as good as the previous episode, "Homer the Moe", "A Hunka Hunka Burns in Love" still "offers a reasonably solid episode". He liked the parts related to the fortune cookies, and stated that “Burns' attempts to woo a much younger woman fare pretty well”. He concluded his review by saying that “enough smiles and snickers emerge to make this an enjoyable show”.

Obsessed With Film's Adam Rayner, in his review of The Simpsons' thirteenth season, wrote that Julia Louis Dreyfus's appearance in the episode was "arguably the best [cameo] of the season".
