= Sweets and Sour Marge =

- The Simpsons episode
- Episode no.: Season 13; Episode 8
- Directed by: Mark Kirkland
- Written by: Carolyn Omine
- Production code: DABF03
- Original air date: January 20, 2002

Guest appearance
- Ben Stiller as Garth Motherloving

Episode features
- Couch gag: The Simpsons sit on the couch. A crane game clamp comes down and picks up Homer, who screams "Ow, my brain!"
- Commentary: Al Jean; Carolyn Omine; Matt Selman; Tom Gammill; Max Pross; Mark Kirkland; Matt Warburton

Episode chronology
← Previous "Brawl in the Family"	Next → "Jaws Wired Shut"
- The Simpsons season 13

"Sweets and Sour Marge" is the eighth episode of the thirteenth season of the American animated television series The Simpsons. It first aired on the Fox network in the United States on January 20, 2002. In the episode, Homer gathers Springfield's citizens to build the world's biggest human pyramid. When it collapses and fails to set the world record, Springfield earns the top spot as the world's fattest town. Marge sues Garth Motherloving's sugar company for making the town's citizens obese. When Springfield bans sugar, Homer conspires with Garth to smuggle it to town.

"Sweets and Sour Marge" was written by Carolyn Omine and directed by Mark Kirkland. It was dedicated to the memory of Ron Taylor. Omine conceived the episode after hearing about smokers who sued tobacco companies. While its plot is loosely based on Erin Brockovich, the episode also features references to Willy Wonka & the Chocolate Factory, What's Eating Gilbert Grape and Butterfinger. It also features Ben Stiller as Garth Motherloving.

In its original broadcast, the episode was seen by approximately 7.5 million viewers, finishing in 34th place in the ratings the week it aired. Following its home video release, the episode received mixed reviews from critics.

== Plot ==
At a library sale, Homer buys a book on world records published by Duff. After boring everyone with world record trivia, Homer tries to get into the book. At the offices, Homer meets Marlon Brando, who he thinks is getting in for being the world's fattest man, but Brando corrects Homer saying he intends to get in for recognition as the world's greatest living actor. When Homer's first attempt at a record (playing a banjo with a cobra) falls flat, he gathers the whole town to build the world's tallest human pyramid. When Jimbo and Kearney move their hands just before the record is claimed, the pyramid collapses into a giant sphere that rolls through town, collecting Agnes Skinner, Hans Moleman and a suicidal man about to jump from a ledge onto the street. The entire town rolls to a truck-weighing station that displays the collective weight of all the citizens put together, and after calculating the average weight of a Springfield citizen, the Duff record book officials declare Springfield the world's fattest town.

The townsfolk are happy to have broken a world record, but Marge worries the whole town is overweight. She learns that nearly everything they eat contains sugar. After complaining to Garth Motherloving (né Hitler), head of the Motherloving Sweets and Sugar Company, Marge sues the sugar industry with the help of Gil and Professor Frink. Judge Snyder, after Motherloving's attempt to bribe him with a briefcase full of sweets, emotionally refutes Motherloving, sides with Marge and bans all sugar products in Springfield, creating what is referred to as "Marge's Law", which angers Homer and most of the town.

The whole town goes cold turkey and suffers from sugar withdrawal. Homer joins a secret group — led by Motherloving — which illegally schemes to return sugar to Springfield. Homer embarks with Bart, Apu, Mr. Burns and a cartoon vampire named Count Fudge-ula (who had testified against Motherloving at the trial) to smuggle sugar from the island of San Glucos. Although Lisa is hesitant over Homer and Bart's plans to break the law, she reluctantly condones their plan after Marge serves steamed limes as a sugar-free dessert. After evading a police boat, Homer brings the sugar to Springfield's docks.

When Marge pleads with him to dump the cargo, Homer has two choices: obey Marge and press the Drop Cargo button or bring the sugar to Motherloving by pressing the Obey Bad Guy button. Homer drops the cargo and the sugar falls into the water near the Springfield docks as a dejected Motherloving leaves. All Springfieldians — even those who seemed happier and healthier without sugar — jump into the harbor and drink the sugar water and eat any sea creatures covered in sugar. Snyder, realising that he may have overstepped his authority, declares the sugar ban over and dives in, too. Marge is upset and considers giving up changing the world, but Homer tells her that he loves her when she tries to make the world a better place.

The episode ends with an In Memoriam to Ron Taylor, who had voiced the character of Bleeding Gums Murphy. Taylor had died four days before the episode aired.

== Production ==
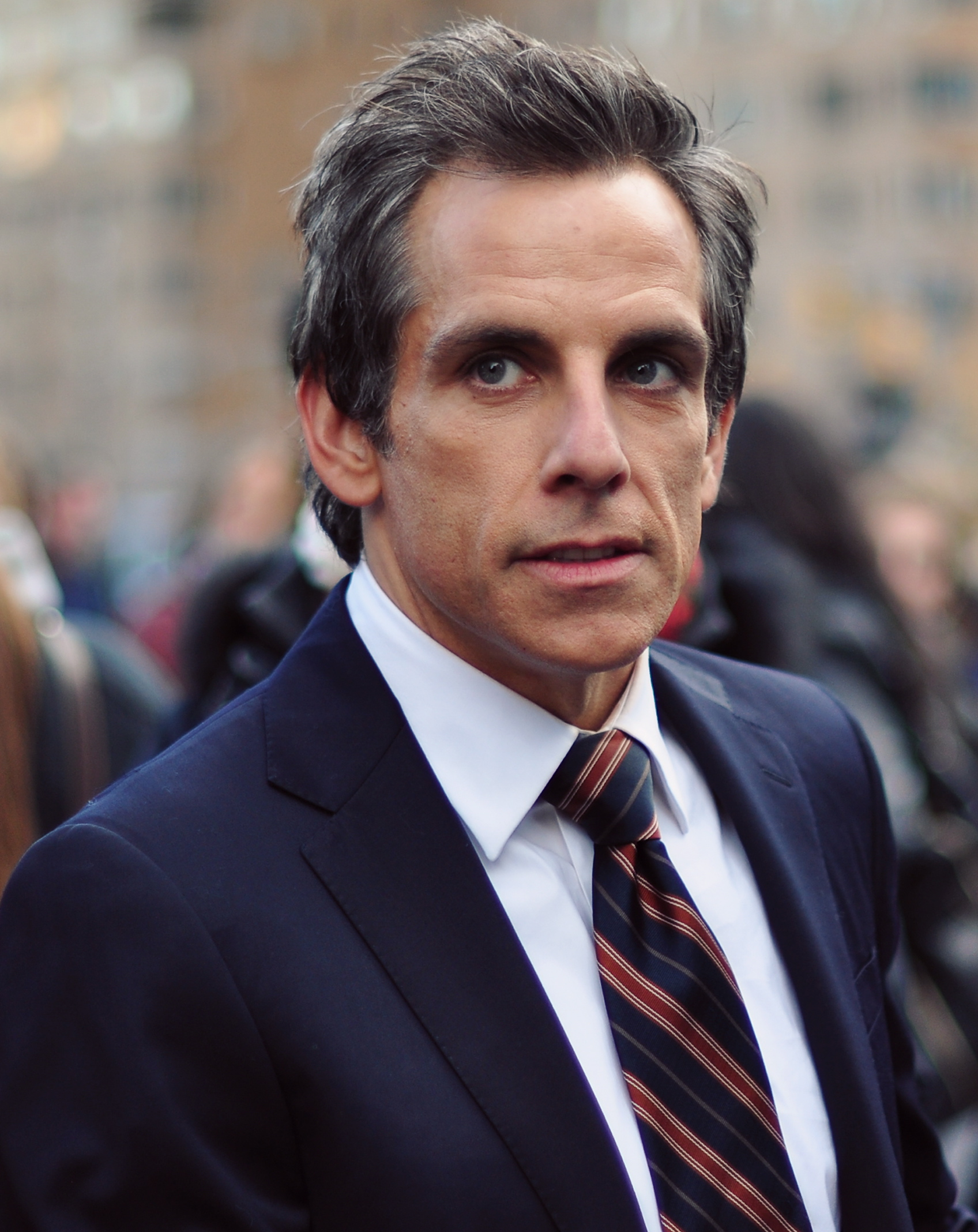
Ben Stiller portrayed Garth Motherloving in the episode.

"Sweets and Sour Marge" was written by Carolyn Omine and directed by Mark Kirkland. It originally aired on the Fox network in the United States on January 20, 2002. The idea for the episode was pitched by Omine, who based it on a lawsuit at the time, wherein smokers sued tobacco companies for selling harmful wares. Omine found it "kinda weird" that the people did not take responsibility for their own health, and joked that, in the future, people might sue food companies for "making them fat", which eventually became the episode's plot. While making the episode, the Simpsons writers decided to compile a list of Springfield's fat residents. According to Omine, the list "never ended", and when the writers realized the number of fat people there were in Springfield, they decided that the residents should try and "go for the world record" in the "fattest people" category. The writers then decided that the residents were trying to set the world record for largest human pyramid, and then accidentally set the record for fattest population. The episode features the first appearance of Cletus' cousin Dia-Betty. The character was animated by Kirkland's assistant Matt Faughnan, who has since become a regular director for the series. Garth Motherloving, the head of the "Motherloving Sweets and Sugar Company", was portrayed by American actor and comedian Ben Stiller.

At one point in the episode, the Springfield residents try to set the record for largest human pyramid, which fails when the pyramid collapses, causing the people to roll into a giant ball. According to director Kirkland, the scene, which the staff members refer to as the "people ball", was very difficult to animate, and it "almost gave [him] a migraine" determining how to implement it in the episode. While trying to figure out how to animate the "people ball", Kirkland spray-painted a globe with white primer and assigned layout artist Paul Wee to draw the Springfield citizens on it with black ink. Normally, the Simpsons animators each draw ten scenes per week, but because he drew the "people ball", Wee was excused from these duties. Since drawing the "people ball" by hand would have "murdered" the animators, they soon decided to photograph it for each frame of the scene. The photographs were taken in Kirkland's garage and were then photocopied using a Xerox photocopier. Executive producer and current showrunner Al Jean stated that the technique for animating the "people ball" was "extremely interesting", although it has never been used again in the series. The "master drawing" of the human pyramid, which Kirkland also stated was very complicated, took animator Matthew Schofield a couple of days to draw. The drawing then became a reference for the other animators to use when animating the scene.

== Cultural references ==
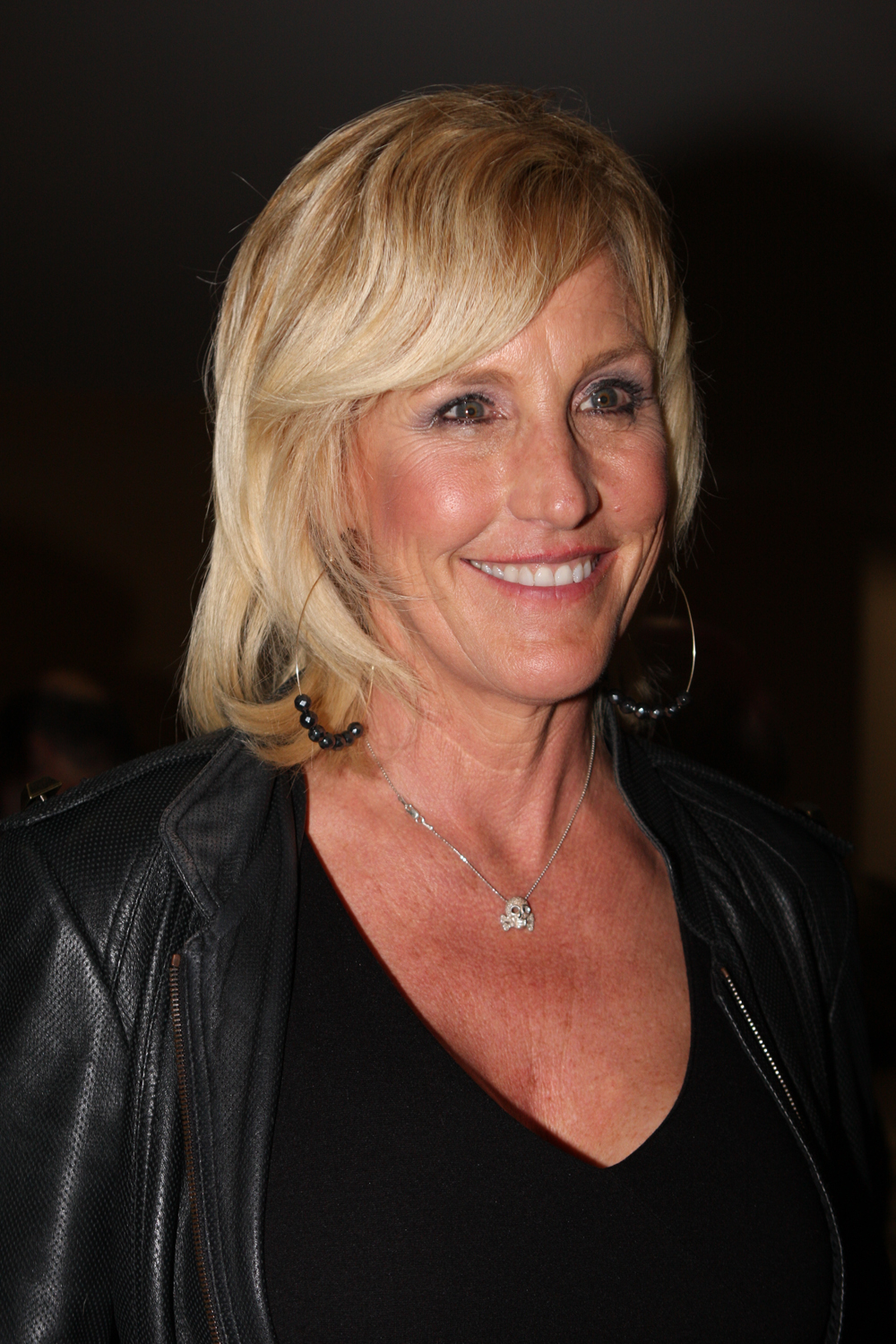
Marge's campaign is based on that of Erin Brockovich

"Sweets and Sour Marge's" plot is loosely based on the 2000 drama film Erin Brockovich, which revolves around Erin Brockovich's legal fight against the US West Coast energy corporation Pacific Gas and Electric Company. The Duff Book of World Records is a parody of the annually published reference book Guinness Book of World Records. When Homer starts playing the banjo, he plays the opening notes of "Dueling Banjos" from the movie Deliverance. Cereal mascot Count Fudgula is a spoof of the General Mills cereal mascot Count Chocula (who, in turn, parodies fictional character Count Dracula). After sugar becomes banned in Springfield, the town's police force can be seen burning confiscated sugar products. However, when they throw an amount of Butterfinger candy bars in the fire, the bars start to glow and are ejected from the fire intact. Disappointed, police chief Clancy Wiggum explains "Even fire doesn't want them." For a long time, The Simpsons characters starred in Butterfinger commercials, which helped the series get launched by earning revenue from the commercials. Around the time "Sweets and Sour Marge" was written, the series contract with Butterfinger was terminated, and the staff therefore decided to make fun of it. "If it had still been in existence, we wouldn't have done it", Jean said in the DVD commentary for the episode. Cletus' cousin Dia-Betty is loosely based on Darlene Cates' character Bonnie Grape in the 1993 film What's Eating Gilbert Grape. During the scene where Apu guide to Homer "the headquarters of the sugar smuggling". The song Axel F plays, composed by Harold Faltermeyer. During the boat chase when Wiggum pursues Homer for the sugar cargo (narrowly avoiding two boats transporting a huge glass pane and a mother and child riding a combined jet ski-stroller), the Miami Vice theme is played. Before he agrees to hand the sugar cargo to Motherloving, Homer demands that he gets to see an Oompa Loompa, a character from the 1964 children's book Charlie and the Chocolate Factory. The Oompa Loompa's design is based on the version used in the 1971 film adaptation Willy Wonka & the Chocolate Factory, which Kirkland watched in order to "get [the design] right."

== Release ==
In its original American broadcast on January 20, 2002, "Sweets and Sour Marge" received a 7.3 rating, according to Nielsen Media Research, translating to approximately 7.5 million viewers. The episode finished in 34th place in the ratings for the week of January 14–20, 2002. On August 24, 2010, "Sweets and Sour Marge" was released as part of The Simpsons: The Complete Thirteenth Season DVD and Blu-ray set. Al Jean, Carolyn Omine, Matt Selman, Tom Gammill, Max Pross, Mark Kirkland and Matt Warburton participated in the audio commentary of the episode.

== Reception ==
Following its home video release, "Sweets and Sour Marge" received mixed reviews from critics. Colin Jacobson of DVD Movie Guide gave the episode a positive review, writing "What would Marge do on the show if she didn’t stage campaigns to tell others what to do? Despite the risk of redundancy, 'Sweets' actually works quite well." He praised Stiller's appearance in the episode, as well as the "exploration of the records book". He concluded his review by considering it "one of Season 13's stronger programs".

Nate Boss of Project-Blu was favorable as well, calling the episode "A funny take on class-action suits (particularly those concerning other consumer products willingly purchased, like tobacco), as well as prohibition."

DVD Verdict's Jennifer Malkowski gave the episode a B rating, and wrote that the "library's 'Yes, we have pornography!' banner" was the episode's "highlight".

Giving it a more mixed review, Ron Martin of 411Mania called the episode "uneven at best, mediocre at worst".

Andre Dellamorte of Collider described it as a "redress" of the season 8 episode "Homer vs. the Eighteenth Amendment", in which Springfield is faced with prohibition.
