= The Old Man and the Key =

- The Simpsons episode
- Episode no.: Season 13; Episode 13
- Directed by: Lance Kramer
- Written by: Jon Vitti
- Production code: DABF09
- Original air date: March 10, 2002

Guest appearances
- Olympia Dukakis as Zelda; Bill Saluga as Ray Jay Johnson

Episode features
- Couch gag: The Simpsons run to the couch, only to find Blue Man Group performing.
- Commentary: Al Jean; Matt Selman; Carolyn Omine; Tom Gammill; Max Pross; Matt Warburton

Episode chronology
← Previous "The Lastest Gun in the West"	Next → "Tales from the Public Domain"
- The Simpsons season 13

"The Old Man and the Key" is the thirteenth episode of the thirteenth season of the American animated television series The Simpsons. It first aired in the United States on the Fox network on March 10, 2002. In the episode, Grampa Simpson falls in love with Zelda, a woman who has just moved into the senior home in which Grampa lives. However, Grampa is not the only one in the home who is infatuated with Zelda.

The episode was written by Jon Vitti and directed by Lance Kramer. The storyline was pitched by Vitti, who based it on an article about social status in senior homes. The episode features Olympia Dukakis as Zelda, and Bill Saluga as his television character Ray J. Johnson. The song "Ode to Branson", which was written by Vitti and composed by Alf Clausen, was submitted for the Primetime Emmy Award for Outstanding Music And Lyrics in 2002, which it ultimately lost to a score from The Blue Planet. The episode was the origin of the "Old man yells at cloud" meme.

== Plot ==
The episode begins with the Simpson family visiting Grampa after his retirement home mistakenly reports his death. An old woman named Zelda moves into his retirement home in place of the actual deceased resident. Grampa is determined to win her love over Zack, another resident who owns and drives a minivan. After renewing his driver's license, Grampa convinces Homer to let him borrow the car to romance her. Although he impresses Zelda, Homer and Marge think she is a hoochie and only likes Grampa because he can drive. After he crashes Homer's car in a drag race with a rival seniors gang, Homer becomes livid with Grampa and takes his keys away, forbidding him to drive ever again. Zelda informs Grampa that she got them tickets to a theater in Branson, Missouri, but when he tells her he does not have a car, she leaves with Zack and his minivan.

Grampa steals Marge's car and takes Bart with him on the road to Branson to win back Zelda. When realizing that Grampa and Bart are heading to Branson, Homer, Marge, Lisa, and Maggie take a bus there. At the theater, Grampa calls out to Zelda from on-stage, but then denounces her in front of everyone, who then chant to her a hoochie, forcing her to leave the stage. Grampa then reconciles with Homer.

== Production ==
"The Old Man and the Key" was written by Jon Vitti and directed by Lance Kramer. It was first broadcast on the Fox network in the United States on March 10, 2002. The idea for the episode was pitched by Vitti, who was inspired by an article about senior homes. The article described senior homes as being a lot like high schools, in that there are popular and unpopular people, and that those who, for example, own a car are "like kings". Vitti suggested that the episode should be that "Grampa's life [is] basically like that of a teenager", with Homer acting as if he was Grampa's father. The Souvenir Jackitos, who challenge Grampa to a death race in the episode, were conceived from an observation by the writers. The writers argued that the only ones buying expensive trademarked jackets are old people who want to appear younger.

A scene in the episode shows Grampa and Bart driving to Branson with Marge's car, listening to the radio. Because the scene consists entirely of auditive gags, the Simpsons staff had difficulty figuring out what to show visually during the scene. In the DVD audio commentary for the episode, Jean explained that these scenes “get a really big laugh at the table,” but are subsequently hard for the animators. The scene makes use of a repeated background, an animation technique made famous by Hanna-Barbera in order to cut budget.

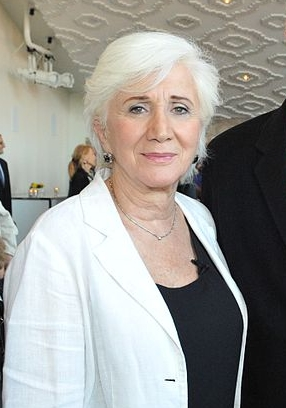
Olympia Dukakis guest-starred as Grampa's love interest Zelda in the episode.

The song "Ode to Branson," which is performed by several "washed-up" celebrities, was composed by Alf Clausen and written by Vitti. Even though Vitti received sole credit for writing the song, parts of the lyrics were written by Simpsons writer Carolyn Omine, which were then revised by fellow writer Matt Selman. Selman was especially satisfied with the rhyme sung by Mr. T; he stated that whenever he feels down, he thinks of that rhyme and that it "boosts [him] up inside." The episode features American actress Olympia Dukakis as Grampa's love interest Zelda. American comedian Bill Saluga also makes an appearance, as his television character Ray J. Johnson. The owner of the minivan is portrayed by series regular Hank Azaria, who imitated the voice of Clark Gable for the character.

== Cultural references ==
The title of the episode itself is a reference of Ernest Hemingway's book The Old Man and the Sea. At the beginning of the episode, Homer is excited about the start of the (original) XFL season, unaware that the "X" didn't stand for anything and that the league itself had folded after its sole season the previous year. A scene in the episode shows Grandpa wearing a zoot suit, a suit popular in the 1940s. When Grandpa and Zelda take off on one of their dates, three old men with long beards imitate ZZ Top as a short part of "Sharp Dressed Man" is played. Grandpa's interaction with the "Souvenir Jackitos" in Apu's store mirrors a scene in the 1961 musical film West Side Story, with Grandpa and his friends taking the role of the Jets in the film, the "Souvenir Jackitos" as the Sharks, and Apu as Doc. The "Death race" on the other hand, is a reference to the 1955 drama film Rebel Without a Cause. The abandoned aqueduct, in which the death race takes place, is based on the Los Angeles River. The closing credits parody those of The Beverly Hillbillies. At the end, Lisa says in a Southern accent, "This has been a Gracie Films presentation," which parodies the line at the end of The Beverly Hillbillies, "This has been a Filmways presentation."

== Release ==
In its original American broadcast on March 10, 2002, "The Old Man and the Key" received a 7.9 rating, according to Nielsen Media Research, translating to approximately 7.9 million viewers. The episode ranked 19 in the top 25 most watched television programs the week it aired. Later in 2002, "Ode to Branson" was nominated for the Primetime Emmy Award for Outstanding Music And Lyrics, which it ultimately lost to a score from BBC's nature documentary The Blue Planet. In 2007, the song was included on the soundtrack album The Simpsons: Testify.

Following the thirteenth season's release on DVD and Blu-ray, "The Old Man and the Key" received mixed reviews from critics.

Writing for Project:Blu, Nate Boss stated that Grampa "just isn't all that funny when cornered, and that's what we get here," and that "the jokes are a bit too few and far between". Giving the episode a negative review, Ryan Keefer of DVD Talk wrote that it was "borderline painful" and one of the season's "duds". Casey Broadwater of Blu-ray.com wrote that the episode "moves at a geriatric pace", and R. L. Shaffer of IGN stated that it "represent[s] some of the worst of The Simpsons." On the other hand, giving the episode a positive review, Ron Martin of 411Mania enjoyed the "poke towards Branson, Missouri, a mecca for old people everywhere," and Jennifer Malkowski of DVD Verdict gave the episode a B rating. Colin Jacobsson of DVD Movie Guide wrote that, even though Grampa is "essentially a one-joke personality," "those gags tend to be pretty fun." He concluded his review by writing that the episode was "a likable program."

Despite the mixed responses, the episode features one of the "most used little clips" of the series. The scene shows Grampa getting his driver's license. Instead of taking a photo for the license on the spot, Grampa suggests that Selma, who works in the facility, use a photo of him from a newspaper headline that reads "Old man yells at cloud." Selma agrees, and Grampa, holding his newly acquired license, goes up to a window and yells "Who's laughing now?" at a cloud. Writer Michael Price credits Al Jean with pitching the gag. A still from the scene has been used several times on The Daily Show. Both Malkowski of DVD Verdict and Jacobsson of DVD Movie Guide considered it to be the best part of the episode. After Clint Eastwood's speech at the 2012 Republican National Convention, which featured Eastwood talking to an empty chair representing President Barack Obama, a modified version of the image with the caption, "Old man yells at chair", was used in an internet meme.
