= The Blunder Years =

- The Simpsons episode
- Waylon Smithers Sr (left) and Mr. Burns (right)
- Episode no.: Season 13; Episode 5
- Directed by: Steven Dean Moore
- Written by: Ian Maxtone-Graham
- Production code: CABF21
- Original air date: December 9, 2001

Guest appearances
- Paul Newman as himself; Joe Mantegna as Fat Tony; Judith Owen as herself

Episode features
- Chalkboard gag: "I am not Charlie Brown on acid"
- Couch gag: The family members freeze in mid-air as the camera pans in bullet time from the TV to the couch.
- Commentary: Mike Scully; Al Jean; Ian Maxtone-Graham; Carolyn Omine; John Frink; Don Payne; Matt Selman; Steven Dean Moore; Joel H. Cohen

Episode chronology
← Previous "A Hunka Hunka Burns in Love"	Next → "She of Little Faith"
- The Simpsons season 13

"The Blunder Years" is the fifth episode of the thirteenth season of the American animated television series The Simpsons. It originally aired on the Fox network in the United States on December 9, 2001. The episode sees Homer, after being hypnotized by the hypnotist Mesmerino while having dinner at the restaurant Pimento Grove, reminded by a repressed traumatic experience from his childhood, including the moment he discovered the dead body of Waylon Smithers' father while having a fun at an abandoned mine. The Simpsons set out to find the corpse that triggered Homer's psychological trauma, which evolves into a murder mystery later in the episode.

The episode was written by Ian Maxtone-Graham while Steven Dean Moore served as the director. The original idea for the episode came from current show runner Al Jean, which involved the murder mystery in the episode. The writers then incorporated Homer's flashbacks, at which point the episode was titled "The Blunder Years", a parody on the television show The Wonder Years.

Following the release of The Simpsons' thirteenth season on DVD and Blu-ray, the episode received mixed reviews from critics.

== Plot ==
After pranking Marge by making her believe that the handsome and muscular model for the Burly paper towel corporation, Chad Sexington, would have dinner with the Simpsons, Homer takes the family to the Pimento Grove to watch live performers as compensation. One of the acts is a hypnotist called Mesmerino. Homer volunteers, and Mesmerino hypnotizes him into thinking he is twelve years old again. As Homer starts to reminisce, he suddenly starts screaming in apparent fear incessantly all through the night. The next day, Lenny and Carl bring him home early from work, still screaming, and Lisa and Marge finally manage to calm him down with some Yaqui tea.

Homer starts to recall the events leading up to the scream-inducing incident: beginning when he, Lenny, and Carl were hiking in the woods and were confronted by a young Fat Tony, only to be saved by a young Moe. Upon noticing that his bar was empty, the present-day Moe arrives at the Simpsons' home and recalls that while they sat by a fire that night, they saw a near-meltdown at the Springfield Nuclear Power Plant. The next day, they went to the old quarry for a swim, and Homer jumped in, only to find that there was no water but only mud. However, Homer recalls that there was no water in the quarry because something was blocking the inlet pipe. When Homer unblocked it, he found a rotting corpse in his lap, causing him to scream so much his voice changed from puberty.

Back in the present, the Simpsons decide to investigate. They go to the old quarry, where they meet Chief Wiggum, who comes with them. Marge uses Burly paper towels to drain the water from the quarry. Finding nothing left of the corpse but a skeleton, they take its skull with them and travel through the pipe to emerge through a hatch in Mr. Burns's office. They confront him about the body, but he insists he did not murder anyone. He tells them that the dead man is Waylon Smithers' father, Waylon Smithers Sr. He shows an old surveillance tape, filmed during the imminent meltdown, in which Smithers' father sacrificed himself by going into an unstable reactor core in order to prevent the meltdown and succumbed to the radiation. Burns then kept the truth from Smithers, who then enters the room, having heard the entire story. Burns apologizes to him, saying he wanted to spare him from knowing the truth about his father's death. However, Smithers admits that he is glad that his father died a hero rather than at the hands of a tribe of savage Amazons, which Burns told him when he was a child.

Declaring the case of the haunted quarry solved, Homer stores the skull in his "Memories" box, despite Marge's insistence to give it to Smithers. Just then, Moe arrives, having found some clues to the case. Despite Homer and Marge telling him the case has been solved, upon seeing Moe despondent, they decide to humor him by letting him show them his clues, which continues through the credits, which ends with Homer screaming again over both the Gracie Films and 20th Century Fox Television logos.

== Production ==
"The Blunder Years" was written by Ian Maxtone-Graham and directed by Steven Dean Moore. It was first broadcast on Fox in the United States on December 9, 2001. Although the episode was written by Maxtone-Graham, the original idea for the episode, which involved Homer finding Smithers' father's corpse, was conceived by writer and current show runner Al Jean. At that point, the episode was titled "Smithers' Father's Apparent Murder" until the writers incorporated flashbacks to Homer's childhood that resembled the story of the film Stand By Me, based on the novella The Body by Stephen King. At this point, the writers changed the episode title to "The Blunder Years."

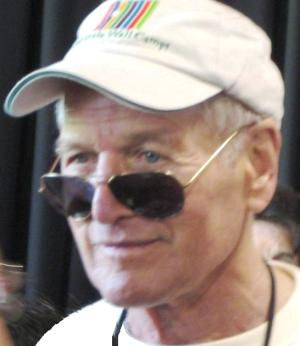
Actor and director Paul Newman guest-starred as himself in the episode.

Homer's first flashback shows a clip of him falling down Springfield Gorge on a skateboard, a scene taken from the episode "Bart the Daredevil." The Simpsons' staff were concerned that this would make people think the episode was in fact a clip show, so they kept the clip short. The staff also debated how horrific Smithers' father's corpse would look. The first design was "more horrific" than the one seen in the episode, and it more closely resembled Smithers. The corpse seen in the episode was an altered version of the first design. The video recorded by Mr. Burns' security camera was originally supposed to be shot in the same angle as a real security camera, but according to director Steven Dean Moore, to follow the narrative, the staff "had to lose [the camera angle]." This led to some confusion, since one of the shots was from inside the core, making it look as if the security camera was actually inside it. The staff intended to cut the shot, but they later decided to keep it in; Jean explained in the DVD audio commentary for the episode that, "Nobody ever notices it." The end of the episode originally had Chad Sexington showing up for his date with Marge, causing Homer to scream uncontrollably again; however, it was cut in favor of Hank Azaria's improvisation as Moe, which, according to Simpsons writer Carolyn Omine, was Azaria's "favorite thing [he] had ever done" on The Simpsons.

American actor and director Paul Newman guest starred as himself in the episode, although he had only one line of dialogue. Newman recorded approximately five or six takes of his line over the phone from the set of a movie he was shooting at the time. According to Maxtone-Graham, Newman recorded his line with no rigamarole; "He just said, 'Sure, I'll do it,' and he did it instantly." The episode also features Joe Mantegna, who plays a young Fat Tony. Welsh singer-songwriter Judith Owen, wife of Simpsons' cast member Harry Shearer, also makes an appearance in the episode.

== Cultural references ==
The episode's title is a reference to the television show The Wonder Years. Homer's flashbacks to his childhood were based on the plot of the film Stand By Me, which in turn is based on Stephen King's novella The Body. However, the scenes in the quarry were based on the coming of age film Breaking Away, directed by Peter Yates. Burly, the brand of paper towels featured in the episode, is based on the real brand Brawny Paper Towels. The model for Burly paper towels, called Chad Sexington, was based on the Brawny paper towels' logo; however, the logo, within "a year or two of [the episode]", was changed into a more "right-of-center" looking brunette, according to director Moore. One of the walls in Pimento Grove shows photos of several characters and guest stars who have appeared on The Simpsons, including Birch Barlow, Stephen Hawking, and Ringo Starr. Mesmerino later reads a letter in a similarly to Carnac the Magnificent, played by Johnny Carson on The Tonight Show Starring Johnny Carson.

== Release and reception ==
Following the release of the thirteenth season of The Simpsons on DVD and Blu-ray, "The Blunder Years" received mixed reviews from critics.

Giving the episode a positive review, Dominic von Riedemann of Suite101 stated that the episode was one of the season's "comedy gems", praising Paul Newman's guest appearance in particular.

Writing for DVD Verdict, Jennifer Malkowski gave a favorable review of the episode, giving a B rating and pointed at the scene in which "Homer says finding a corpse explains everything that's gone wrong in his life—especially his fear of corpses" as the highlight of the episode.

Colin Jacobsson of DVD Movie Guide was positive, calling the episode a "reasonably amusing spoof [of Stand By Me]". He enjoyed "Marge's lust for Burly" and "Homer's rampaging fear", and concluded by saying that, while nothing in the episode "dazzles", it still "adds up to a good episode".

Ron Martin of 411mania was less enthusiastic about the episode. Calling the episode a "bad parody of Stand By Me", Martin wrote that "any moments this episode might have had are annulled by the constant annoyance of Homer screaming through the first half of the episode".
