= Springfield (surname) =

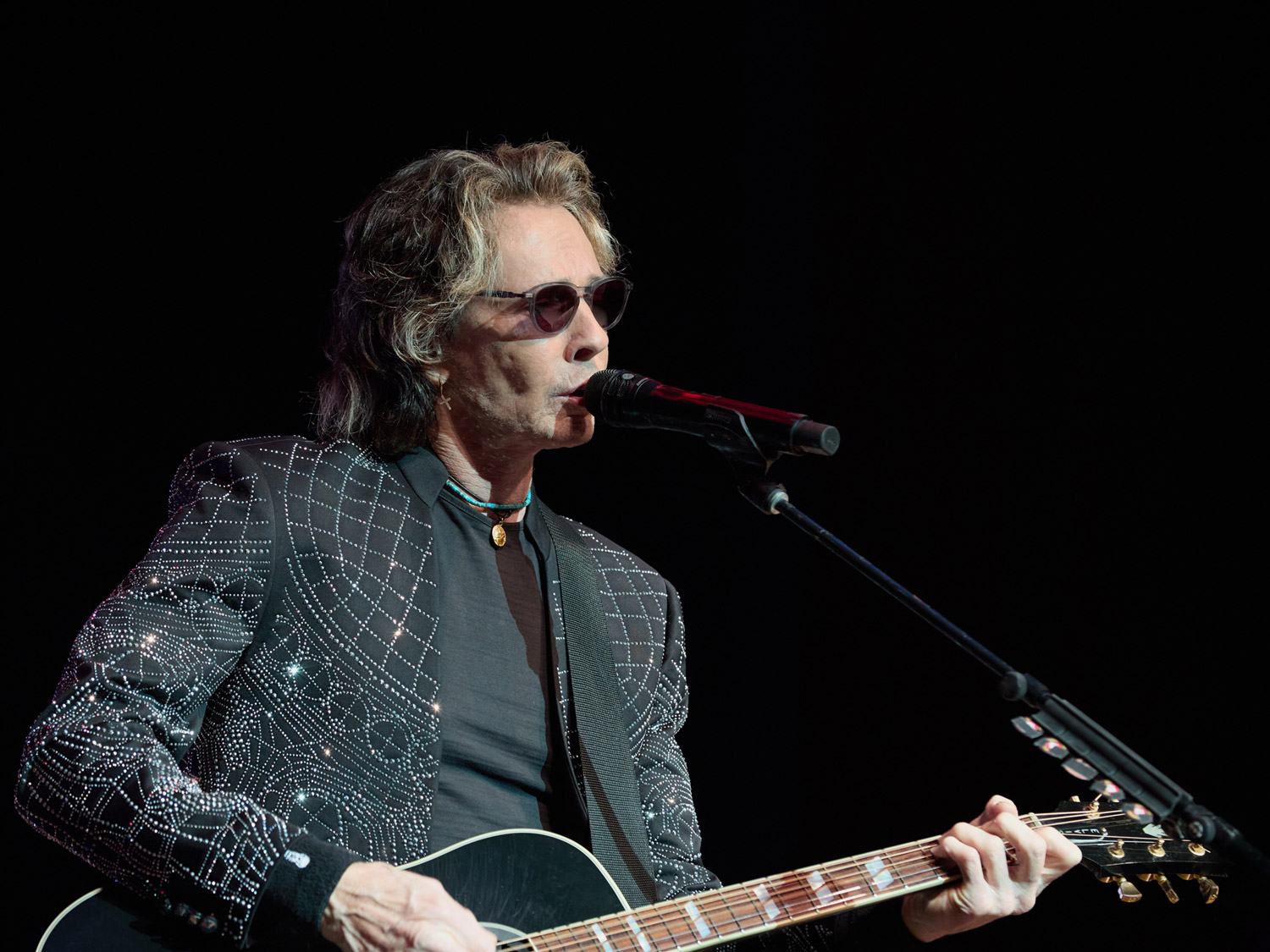
- Rick Springfield
- Language: English

Origin
- Region of origin: United States

Other names
- Related names: Springford, Spring, Springs, Stringfellow

Springfield is a surname of English origin, derived from places named "Springfield" in the US, Australia, Canada and UK, after the village of Springfield in Essex. Notable people with the surname include:

- Adam Springfield (born 1982), American actor
- Dusty Springfield (1939–1999), professional name of Mary O'Brien, English pop singer
- Molly Springfield (born 1977), American artist
- Rick Springfield (born 1949), American pop singer
- Tom Springfield (1934–2022), English musician, songwriter, record producer, brother of Dusty (born Dion O'Brien)

== Fictional characters ==
- Jebediah Springfield founder of Springfield, from The Simpsons
- Negi Springfield the main anime character from Mahou Sensei Negima
- Mr. Springfield, a character in the comic book series MPH

== See also ==
- Springfield (toponym)
  - Springfield (The Simpsons)
- Springfield (disambiguation)
- Springfield Plantation (disambiguation)
- Springfield Township (disambiguation)
- North Springfield (disambiguation)
- West Springfield (disambiguation)
