= Springfield =

Springfield most often refers to:

- Springfield (toponym), the place name in general

Springfield may also refer to:

== Populated places (cities, communities, districts, etc.) ==
=== Australia ===
- Springfield, New South Wales (Central Coast)
- Springfield, New South Wales (Snowy Monaro Regional Council)
- Springfield, Queensland
- Springfield, Queensland (Mareeba Shire)
- Springfield, South Australia
- Springfield, Tasmania, a locality
- Springfield, Victoria (Shire of Buloke), in north-western Victoria
- Springfield, Victoria (Macedon Ranges), in central Victoria

=== Canada ===
- Rural Municipality of Springfield, in Manitoba
  - Springfield (federal electoral district), a federal electoral division in Manitoba
  - Springfield (provincial electoral district), a provincial electoral division in Manitoba
- Springfield Parish, New Brunswick
  - Springfield, Kings County, New Brunswick, an unincorporated community
- Springfield, Newfoundland and Labrador
- Springfield, Nova Scotia
- Springfield, Ontario
- Springfield, Prince Edward Island
- Springfeld, Saskatchewan

=== Ireland ===
- Springfield, a townland in County Offaly
- Springfield, a townland in County Westmeath

=== United Kingdom ===
==== England ====
===== Greater London =====
- Springfield (Hackney ward), London Borough of Hackney
- Springfield (Ealing ward), London Borough of Ealing
- Springfield (Wandsworth ward), London Borough of Wandsworth
- Springfield University Hospital, Tooting

===== Elsewhere in England =====
- Springfield, Birmingham
- Springfield, Essex, England
- Springfield, Milton Keynes, England
- Springfield, Sandwell, a place in Sandwell, England
- Springfield, an area in Sutton Farm, a suburb of Shrewsbury, England
- Springfield, Wigan, a place in Wigan, England
- Springfield, Wolverhampton, England

==== Northern Ireland ====
- Springfield, County Fermanagh

==== Scotland ====
- Springfield, Dumfries and Galloway
- Springfield, Fife
- Springfield, Highland, a place in Highland

==== Wales ====
- Springfield, Caerphilly, a place in Caerphilly County Borough

=== United States ===
- Springfield, Arkansas
- Springfield, California
- Springfield, Colorado
- Springfield, Florida, a city in Bay County
- Springfield, Jacksonville, Florida, a neighborhood
- Springfield, Georgia
- Springfield, Idaho
- Springfield, Illinois, the state capital of Illinois
  - Springfield metropolitan area, Illinois
- Springfield, LaPorte County, Indiana
- Springfield, Posey County, Indiana
- Springfield, Kentucky
- Springfield, Louisiana
- Springfield, Maine
- Springfield, Massachusetts, the first Springfield settled in the US
  - Springfield metropolitan area, Massachusetts
- Springfield, Michigan, a city in Calhoun County
- Springfield, Minnesota, in Brown County
- Springfield, Missouri, the most populous city named Springfield in the US
  - Springfield metropolitan area, Missouri
- Springfield, Nebraska
- Springfield, New Hampshire
- Springfield, New Jersey (disambiguation), multiple places in New Jersey with this name
- Springfield, New York
  - Springfield Gardens, a neighborhood in the southeastern region of the Queens borough in New York City, New York
- Springfield, Ohio
  - Springfield metropolitan area, Ohio
- Springfield, Oregon
- Springfield School District (Delaware County), Pennsylvania
- Springfield, South Carolina
- Springfield, South Dakota
- Springfield, Tennessee
- Springfield, Texas, an unincorporated community in Jim Wells County
- Springfield, former town and county seat of Limestone County, Texas, now part of Fort Parker State Park
- Springfield, U.S. Virgin Islands
- Springfield, Vermont
  - Springfield (CDP), Vermont
- Springfield, Virginia (disambiguation), multiple places in Virginia with this name
  - Springfield, Virginia, a census-designated place in Fairfax County
- Springfield, West Virginia
- Springfield, Wisconsin (disambiguation), multiple places in Wisconsin with this name

=== Other countries ===
- Springfield, Belize
- Springfield, New Zealand
- Springfield, Gauteng, South Africa

== Buildings and facilities ==
=== Train stations ===
- Franconia–Springfield station, Virginia
- Springfield station (Illinois)
- Springfield Union Station (Massachusetts)

=== Other buildings and facilities ===
- Springfield (Universal Theme Parks), the area themed around the fictional town of the same name from the American animated sitcom, The Simpsons
- Springfield Armory, the former U.S. military firearms factory in Springfield, Massachusetts
- Springfield Hotel, a public house in Wigan, England
- Springfields, a nuclear fuel production installation in Lancashire, England
- MGM Springfield, a hotel and casino complex in Metro Center, Springfield, Massachusetts
- Naismith Memorial Basketball Hall of Fame in Springfield, Massachusetts, referred to as "Springfield"

== Arts, entertainment, and media ==
=== Fictional characters ===
- Jebediah Springfield, founder of Springfield, from The Simpsons
- Negi Springfield, the main anime character from Mahou Sensei Negima
- Mr. Springfield, in the comic book series MPH

=== Fictional places ===
- Springfield (The Simpsons), hometown of the Simpson family in The Simpsons
- Springfield (Guiding Light), a community in the television soap opera Guiding Light
- Springfield, the setting of the American comedy TV series Father Knows Best
- Springfield, the central base of operations and secret hub of Cobra (G.I. Joe), the terrorist organization and enemy of GI Joe

=== Music ===
- Springfield (album), 1996, by Carole Fredericks
- "Springfield", a 2015 single by ItaloBrothers and Martin Tungevaag
- Buffalo Springfield, 1960s American rock band

=== Television ===
- "$pringfield (or, How I Learned to Stop Worrying and Love Legalized Gambling)", a 1993 episode of The Simpsons

=== Other uses in arts and entertainment ===
- Springfield (Universal Theme Parks), the area themed around the fictional town of the same name from the American animated sitcom, The Simpsons

== Education ==
- RGS Springfield, mixed-sex junior school of RGS Worcester
- Springfield High School (disambiguation)
- Springfield School (disambiguation)
- Springfield School District (Delaware County), Pennsylvania
- University of Illinois Springfield

== Historical events ==
- Attack on Springfield, in 1675, Springfield, Massachusetts, was burned to the ground during King Philip's War
- Battle of Springfield (1780), near Springfield, New Jersey, during the American Revolutionary War
- First Battle of Springfield, an October 25, 1861, battle of the American Civil War in Greene County, Missouri
- Second Battle of Springfield, a January 8, 1863, battle in the American Civil War fought in Springfield, Missouri
- Springfield race riot of 1908

== People with the surname ==
- Springfield (surname)

== Other uses ==
- Springfield rifle, any of several types of small arms produced by the Springfield Armory
- Springfield (horse), an English Thoroughbred racehorse
- Springfield (retailer), a Madrid-based fashion brand owned by Tendam
- USS Springfield, several US Navy ships

== See also ==
- Buffalo Springfield, a folk rock band
- North Springfield (disambiguation)
- Springfield Plantation (disambiguation)
- Springfield Township (disambiguation)
- West Springfield (disambiguation)
