= Springfield Township, New Jersey =

Springfield Township, New Jersey may refer to:

- Springfield Township, Burlington County, New Jersey
- Springfield Township, Union County, New Jersey

== See also ==
- Springfield Township (disambiguation)
