= A Tale of Two Springfields =

- The Simpsons episode
- Episode no.: Season 12; Episode 2
- Directed by: Shaun Cashman
- Written by: John Swartzwelder
- Production code: BABF20
- Original air date: November 5, 2000

Guest appearances
- Roger Daltrey and John Entwistle as themselves; Paul Townshend as Pete Townshend; Gary Coleman as himself

Episode features
- Chalkboard gag: "I will not plant subliminAL messaGOREs"
- Couch gag: Bart reaches the couch first and slips a whoopee cushion under Homer's cushion. When the rest of the family runs in, Homer triggers the whoopee cushion's farting sound, causing him to grin sheepishly at a frowning Marge and Lisa while Bart laughs uproariously.
- Commentary: Matt Groening; Mike Scully; George Meyer; Al Jean; Ian Maxtone-Graham; Don Payne; Matt Selman; Dan Castellaneta; Shaun Cashman; Roger Daltrey; David Silverman

Episode chronology
← Previous "Treehouse of Horror XI"	Next → "Insane Clown Poppy"
- The Simpsons season 12

"A Tale of Two Springfields" is the second episode of the twelfth season of the American animated television series The Simpsons, and the 250th episode of the series overall in both broadcast and production order. It originally aired on the Fox network in the United States on November 5, 2000. In the episode, Homer discovers that Springfield has two different area codes and ends up leading a revolt that splits the town in two.

The episode was written by John Swartzwelder and directed by Shaun Cashman and guest starred Roger Daltrey and John Entwistle of the Who. The episode was inspired by Don Payne, based on the area where his mother lived, where one side of town would spread rumors about the other side. Larry Doyle then pitched that the two sides of Springfield would be divided because of a telephone area code. The episode features cultural references to the Who and the Norman Rockwell painting Freedom of Speech, and has received positive reviews from critics.

In November 2004, Channel 4 chose this episode to be the first episode to be broadcast on the channel, having taken the terrestrial rights to air the show from BBC Two.

== Plot ==
A badger takes up residence in Santa's Little Helper's doghouse. After several failed attempts to lure it out (including sending in Homer, whom the badger attacks), Homer calls animal control. When he is unable to get through, Marge explains that the phone company has introduced a new area code to Springfield. Half of the town keeps the original 636 area code, the other has 939. Homer becomes infuriated when he loses out on winning tickets to see the Who live in concert to Mr. Burns in a radio show's give-away. At a town meeting, after being shown a patronising, deflective film produced by the telephone company, Homer rallies an angry mob to protest the change, noting that the upper class side of town got to keep their area code while the poorer half were forced to switch. After failing to detonate a bomb vest he wore to the meeting, Homer then proposes that the town split into two halves, and the mob agrees.

Homer is declared mayor of New Springfield. After Homer pelts Mayor Quimby with beer cans (while the latter was giving a speech calling for conciliation), tensions rise between the two towns. Old Springfield businesses discriminate against customers from New Springfield, and condescend them on the nightly news. Bart and Homer shut off the power to Old Springfield. Old Springfield hijacks a beer truck heading for New Springfield and dumps its contents in the river; Homer and New Springfield then cut off their water supply. When the lack of water reveals gold in the river bed, making Old Springfield even richer and allowing the town to purchase a French water factory, an enraged Homer has a wall built between the two towns. However, a lack of supplies and sanitation drives all of the New Springfield residents over to Old Springfield, leaving the Simpsons alone.

Bitter, Homer attempts to sabotage the Who concert in Old Springfield by convincing them to play in New Springfield instead. When the people of Old Springfield realize this, they confront the Simpsons at the wall. After a brief riot during which flaming garbage is catapulted into New Springfield, the members of the Who hear about the area code problem and suggest that the townspeople get speed dial. Pete Townshend's opening riff from "Won't Get Fooled Again" crumbles the wall, and the citizens of Springfield reunite and dance to the music as the badger leads an animal invasion of the town.

== Production ==
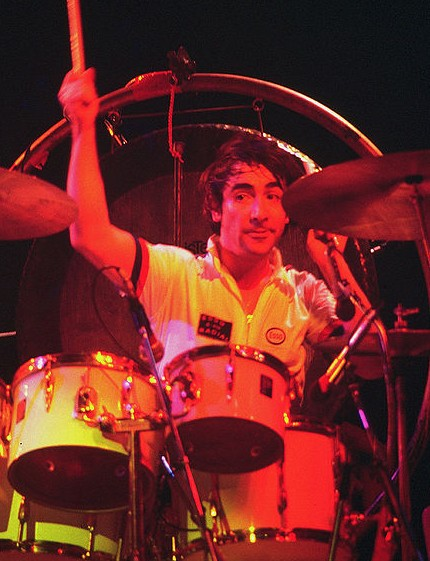
Drummer Keith Moon, who died in 1978, is in the Who's line-up in this episode

The episode was pitched by John Frink and Don Payne. The episode was inspired by Don Payne's mother's neighborhood, where one side would spread rumors about the other side. Larry Doyle then pitched that the sides split apart because of different area codes. During production the staff did not want one side to be slobs like Homer Simpson and the other snobs like Mr. Burns, but this ended up happening in the final product. The writers later created a website about what badgers eat.

The phone from the educational cartoon was voiced by Dan Castellaneta. The Who's singer Roger Daltrey and bassist John Entwistle made guest appearances in the episode; however, guitarist Pete Townshend did not appear because he did not know he was expected to provide his own voice and assumed someone else would, as in Yellow Submarine. Pete's brother Paul Townshend appeared as an additional guest voice instead. After a number of calls were made by the show's casting director in Los Angeles to the Who's managers in London, the group agreed to appear on the show. The Who recorded their lines in England, but weighed in on script details. During production the staff decided against including Zak Starkey, who has played drums for the Who since 1996, and chose instead to animate the band's original drummer Keith Moon as a tribute.

=== Deleted scenes ===
When Roger Daltrey hits Marge with his microphone he improvised and said "Shut the fuck up, Marge." This was later included in the deleted scenes on The Simpsons – The Complete Twelfth Season DVD release. In the TV broadcast version, Daltrey says "Get out of the way, Marge".

== Cultural references ==
The episode title is a play on the name of Charles Dickens' novel, A Tale of Two Cities. When Homer stands up in the press conference it is a reference to Norman Rockwell's painting Freedom of Speech. When it is suggested that Homer be the mayor of New Springfield, he imagines himself in the opening sequence of The Rifleman, instead as the Mayor. The scene in which Homer and Marge take a picture is a staff in-joke about "Trash of the Titans" when the voice director told Bono to smile. The episode also features several references to the Who, including "Magic Bus" and Meaty Beaty Big and Bouncy. Moe's comment "That fat, dumb, and bald guy sure plays a mean hardball" is a reference to a Who song, "Pinball Wizard". The wall itself is a reference to the Berlin Wall, with "New Springfield" representing East Berlin.

The two telephone area codes used in the episode are actual area codes in the North American Numbering Plan. 636 is assigned to phone numbers in the western suburbs of St. Louis, Missouri, while 939 is primarily used by mobile phones in Puerto Rico.

== Reception ==
Colin Jacobson of the DVD Movie Guide gave the episode a positive review saying "Maybe it’s the low expectations that accompany 21st century Simpsons episodes, but 'Tale' works for me. It takes a simple premise and turns in a good number of strong comedic bits. Hey, and a mention of 'golden showers' keeps the Season 12 perverted sexual practices streak going!", although he criticized the animation of the Who other than Daltrey, saying that "That’s particularly odd in the case of Pete, as he’d gone awfully bald and gray by 2000." Jennifer Malkowski of the DVD Verdict said the greatest moment was a tie between "Sacred bond" and "Who huddle". Nancy Basile of About.com gave the episode a 5 writing "Finally! I loved this episode because, flashy guest stars aside, it got back to the heart and soul of the show."

In 2007, Simon Crerar of The Times listed the Who's performance as one of the thirty-three funniest cameos in the history of the show. There was a backlash from Internet fans who found the scene of Homer nearly getting disemboweled by the badger and showing his internal organs to Lisa to be too disgusting for The Simpsons, citing the gore to be more at home in such animated shows as South Park and Family Guy.
