= Treehouse of Horror XI =

- The Simpsons episode
- Promotional artwork for the episode featuring the family as The Munsters.
- Episode no.: Season 12; Episode 1
- Directed by: Matthew Nastuk
- Written by: "G-G-Ghost D-D-Dad": Rob LaZebnik; "Scary Tales Can Come True": John Frink; Don Payne; "Night of the Dolphin": Carolyn Omine
- Production code: BABF21
- Original air date: November 1, 2000

Episode features
- Commentary: Matt Groening; Mike Scully; John Frink; Don Payne; Rob LaZebnik; Matt Selman; Carolyn Omine; Max Pross

Episode chronology
← Previous "Behind the Laughter"	Next → "A Tale of Two Springfields"
- The Simpsons season 12

"Treehouse of Horror XI" is the first episode of the twelfth season of the American animated television series The Simpsons, the 249th episode overall, and the eleventh Halloween episode. The episode features "G-G-Ghost D-D-Dad", "Scary Tales Can Come True" and "Night of the Dolphin" and was written by Rob LaZebnik (story by Mike Scully), John Frink, Don Payne and Carolyn Omine and directed by Matthew Nastuk.

This year's installment sees Homer as a wandering spirit who must do one good deed before going to Heaven ("G-G-Ghost D-D-Dad"), Bart and Lisa as genre-savvy peasant children who end up lost in a fairy tale forest in "Scary Tales Can Come True", and Springfield's population at war with sea mammals in "Night of the Dolphin".

The episode first aired on November 1, 2000, beginning a practice of the show's Halloween episodes debuting after the holiday itself due to Fox's late-October prime time schedule being pre-empted by the network's coverage of the 2000 World Series. (Until 2010, all subsequent Halloween episodes save for 2009's "Treehouse of Horror XX" premiered in November; 2011's "Treehouse of Horror XXII" onwards has had the network resuming airing the episodes on or before Halloween save for 2020's "Treehouse of Horror XXXI", 2023's "Treehouse of Horror XXXIV", and 2024's "Treehouse of Horror XXXV" having premiered in November.) This was also the first Simpsons episode to have mixed-case closed captioning. The episode received positive reviews from critics.

== Plot ==
The opening sequence is a parody of The Munsters, with Homer as Herman, Marge as Lily, Lisa as Marilyn, Bart as Eddie and Grampa as Grandpa Munster. Meanwhile, at the front of their mansion, an angry mob of townspeople attack the Munster Simpsons. They stab Marge and Grampa in the chest with stakes, set Homer on fire, and activate a bear trap on Bart's head, leaving Lisa unharmed; she then walks away from the scene while whistling, pretending that she had no connection to the monstrous family.

=== "G-G-Ghost D-D-Dad" ===
Homer's horoscope says he will die that day. He dismisses it and leaves for work, narrowly escaping death several times on the way there. He is still alive at the end of the day, but is finally killed by a piece of broccoli.

In Heaven, St. Peter informs Homer that he had not done a good deed in his life, and must perform one within 24 hours before he can officially be let into Heaven, although this is reduced to 23 hours when he re-eats the broccoli that killed him and re-dies. Over the next 24 hours, Homer tries to do good deeds, such as saving Bart from being bullied by Nelson and helping Principal Skinner's mother, Agnes across the street, which ends up with him dropping her to her death and Homer defending his actions by stating that she was "going to be the next Hitler". With only one minute left, Homer saves a woman's baby in a runaway stroller. Confident, he returns to St. Peter with news of his good deed. Unfortunately, St. Peter did not see Homer perform his good deed as he distracted himself by reading a newspaper. Homer is then sent to Hell, where Satan puts Homer in a headlock and gives him a noogie for all eternity. Homer screams in pain, but Satan tells him to be quiet as he will "wake up John Wayne", who has already woken up for his day in Hell.

=== "Scary Tales Can Come True" ===
In a fairy tale setting, the Simpsons are peasants living in a pumpkin cottage. After Homer lost his job as the village oaf, he abandons Bart and Lisa in the woods to solve the family's food shortage. When Homer returns to the cottage, Marge has him go out looking for the children after admonishing him for throwing them out instead of selling them.

Meanwhile, with the help of Lisa's copy of Grimm's Fairy Tales, she and Bart manage to elude the many dangerous creatures in the forest, including a troll-like Moe and the Three Bears, who viciously maul Goldilocks after Bart and Lisa leave the Three Bears' cottage, locking her inside. The siblings eventually come across a gingerbread house owned by a witch. Lisa is wary as it is exactly like the story "Hansel and Gretel", but Bart is too busy eating treats to care. Lisa tries to stall the witch by claiming she is lonely. The witch denies this, claiming she has a boyfriend named "George Cauldron". When Lisa scoffs at this, the witch attempts to throw her into the oven, but Homer arrives to save the children, eating his way through the gingerbread house's walls. The witch turns Homer into a half-chicken, half-fish creature with donkey ears and broom-arms. She then tries to shove him into the oven, only for Homer to overpower and shove her to her death in the oven, before George Cauldron comes to the door. The Simpsons are reunited, and are now living happily ever after with a mostly restored Homer still having a chicken's lower body as he produces eggs for the family, meaning that they will never go hungry again.

=== "Night of the Dolphin" ===
In a parody of The Day of the Dolphin and The Birds, Lisa takes pity on the star attraction of Springfield's Marine World, a dolphin named Snorky, whose trainers let him be humiliated while forced to perform stunts for the crowd's amusement. After Snorky's show, Lisa sets the dolphin free to swim in the ocean. Unbeknownst to Lisa, Snorky is actually king of the dolphins and organizes the world's dolphins into an army to declare war on humanity.

The dolphins attack Springfield, first killing Lenny during his whiskey-soaked night swim ("alcohol and nightswimming: it's a winning combination") and then the Sea Captain (who claimed he could stop them) before marching towards the town on their tails. During the town meeting, Snorky takes the stage and reveals he is capable of speaking. Snorky tells Springfield that dolphins used to live on land but were banished to the ocean by humans. Now the dolphins want to banish all mankind to live underwater. The humans refuse to submit to the dolphins' will without a fight, only to find the dolphins greatly outnumber them. When Lisa is bitten by a small dolphin after removing a set of bottle rings around its face, Homer encourages the townspeople to fight back. A battle ensues between the dolphins and the humans, with heavy casualties on both sides. The end of the story reveals the humans lost the war and have been driven into the sea. Lisa admits she regrets freeing Snorky in the first place, but Marge comforts her that everyone will have to adjust to their new life as "marine animals". As Marge says this, several corpses, including Krusty the Clown, floating past form the words "The End?" nearby, much to her disgust and sadness.

=== Epilogue – Kang and Kodos ===
Meanwhile, after the final story ended, the two aliens Kang and Kodos complain that they have been left out of the Halloween special, until they get an offer to do commercials for Old Navy which they accept.

== Production ==
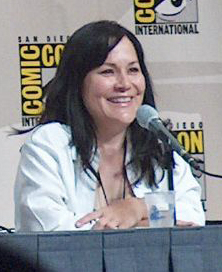
Carolyn Omine wrote the last segment "Night of the Dolphin".

The episode was directed by Matthew Nastuk and written by Rob LaZebnik, John Frink, Don Payne, and Carolyn Omine. The first segment, "G-G-Ghost D-D-Dad" was written by Rob LaZebnik, but the idea came from then current show runner, Mike Scully. It is Rob Lazebnik's first writing credit for the series with his second being the fifth episode of the season "Homer vs. Dignity". The second segment, "Scary Tales Can Come True" is the second written by John Frink and Don Payne after "Insane Clown Poppy", but that did not air later in the season. The segment was the idea of another writer.

The third segment, "Night of the Dolphin" was written by Carolyn Omine. The writers wanted to have a segment in a tribute to an animal and settled on dolphins, because they are "the friendliest animal in the world". Omine conceived the way the dolphins walked on land and pitched this to director Matthew Nastuk. The King Dolphin's voice is Harry Shearer's normal voice. There are two deleted scenes that are now available on the DVD: One with Dr. Julius Hibbert fighting with hypodermics and one where Moe Szyslak puts a gas tube down a dolphin's blow hole during the humans vs. dolphin war. During production, the writers included a scene with Kang and Kodos, which was mentioned at the episode's conclusion. Several elements of the "Night of the Dolphin" segment was used in The Simpsons Game.

== Cultural references ==
The opening is a parody of The Munsters. "Scary Tales Can Come True" is a parody of Grimms' Fairy Tales. The scene in which the baby's stroller starts falling down the stairs mirrors a similar scene in Battleship Potemkin. In "Night of the Dolphin", the scene in which Snorky jumps out of the water park and into the ocean is a parody of Free Willy. Lenny being killed by dolphins during a night swim is a parody of the opening to Jaws. The dolphins outside the town meeting is a parody of The Birds. The title and plot are based on Mike Nichols's Day of the Dolphin. The witch remarking "George... George Cauldron" while looking at a cauldron is a parody of Jan from The Brady Bunch doing the same while making up a name for a fictional boyfriend in the episode "The Not-so-ugly Duckling"; looking at a glass, she states his name is "George... George Glass".

== Reception ==
Since its original airing the episode has received generally positive reviews. Matt Haigh of Den of Geek quoted "it is probably one of the funniest Halloween episodes of the show's history". Matt Groening called the third segment one of his personal favorite scenes from all the series.

Colin Jacobson of DVD Movie Guide gave the episode a positive review saying "Even in the weakest Simpsons seasons, you can count on the Halloween episodes to deliver good amusement. Or at least pretty decent comedy, as evidenced by the up and down "Treehouse XI". None of the segments excel, but none of them flop either, so they keep us entertained. It's really hard to fault a mainstream network TV series that references glory holes, so "Treehouse XI" gets a positive appraisal despite a few missteps." Mac McEntire of the DVD Verdict said the greatest moments of the episode was "Snorky...mad".
