= Springfield Township, Indiana =

Springfield Township, Indiana may refer to:

- Springfield Township, Allen County, Indiana
- Springfield Township, Franklin County, Indiana
- Springfield Township, LaGrange County, Indiana
- Springfield Township, LaPorte County, Indiana

== See also ==
- Springfield Township (disambiguation)
