= Stringfellow (surname) =

Stringfellow is a surname. Notable people with the surname include:

- Benjamin Franklin Stringfellow (1816–1891), American Attorney General and businessman
- Benjamin Franklin Stringfellow (1840–1913), Confederate spy
- Clinton Stringfellow (1905–1959), New Zealand rugby union player
- Douglas Stringfellow (1922–1966), American politician and military imposter
- Frank Stringfellow (footballer) (1888–), English footballer
- Ian Stringfellow (born 1969), English footballer
- James Stringfellow, one-time owner of the Stringfellow Acid Pits, a toxic waste dump and Superfund site
- Joe Stringfellow (1918–1992), American football player
- John Stringfellow (1799–1883), English early aeronautical inventor and engineer
- John H. Stringfellow (1819–1905), American politician and doctor
- Ken Stringfellow (born 1968), American musician
- Lessie Stringfellow Read (1891–1971), American journalist, clubwoman, adopted by the Stringfellow family after her parents died
- Mike Stringfellow (born 1943), English footballer
- Olga Stringfellow (1923–1995), New Zealand novelist
- Peter Stringfellow (1940–2018), English nightclub owner
- Peter Stringfellow (footballer) (born 1939), English footballer
- Savanté Stringfellow (born 1978), American long jumper
- Thomas Stringfellow, a contestant on American Idol season 15
- Thornton Stringfellow (1788–1869), American Baptist clergyman, defender of slavery
- William Stringfellow (1928–1985), American theologian

== See also ==
- Stringfellow (disambiguation)
