= Hastings, Nova Scotia =

Hastings, Nova Scotia may refer to the following places in Nova Scotia, Canada:

- Hastings, Annapolis County, Nova Scotia in Annapolis County
- Hastings, Cumberland, Nova Scotia in Cumberland County
