= Crossburn, Nova Scotia =

Community in Nova Scotia, Canada

Coordinates: 44°44′36″N 64°49′8″W

Crossburn is an unincorporated community in the Canadian province of Nova Scotia, located on the county line of Annapolis County and Kings County.

Crossburn was established in 1905 by the Davison Lumber Company as one of their main lumber camps. The settlement was named by J. W. Cross, the superintendent of the Davison Lumber Company, who was born in Cassburn, Ontario. The name "Crossburn" is an altered form of his birthplace incorporating his last name. A school and post office were erected in Crossburn in 1906.

Crossburn was connected to Hastings Junction by rail via the Springfield Railway, built in 1905; the railway was dismantled in 1921. The same year, the Davison Lumber Company closed their operations in the area.

== See also ==
- Springfield, Nova Scotia
