= Springfield (toponym) =

Common place-name in the United States

US States and territories with one or more populated places named Springfield.

Springfield is a famously common place-name in the English-speaking world, especially in the United States. According to the U.S. Geological Survey there are currently 93 populated places named Springfield in the United States. Database studies reveal that there are several more common U.S. place-names than Springfield, including Fairview and Midway.

== History ==
Historically, the first American place named Springfield was Springfield, Massachusetts, founded in 1636 by William Pynchon, an English colonist. Pynchon named Springfield after his hometown in England, Springfield, Essex. Springfield, Massachusetts, became nationally important in 1777, when George Washington founded the United States' National Armory at Springfield. During the 19th century, Springfield became one of the world's leading centers of the Industrial Revolution, pioneering advances in interchangeable parts. Springfield, Illinois and Springfield, Missouri, among other American cities and towns named Springfield, were named after Springfield, Massachusetts.

== Major centers ==
As of the 2020 census, Springfield, Missouri, and Springfield, Massachusetts, were the world's most populous cities named Springfield, with 169,176 and 155,929 residents, respectively. Springfield, Illinois, the one-time home of Abraham Lincoln, is the only U.S. state capital with the name. As of 2020, it had a population of 114,394.

In the United States, there are four Springfield Metropolitan Statistical Areas, located in Illinois, Massachusetts, Missouri and Ohio. As of the 2020 census, the most populous was the one in Massachusetts, which had 699,162 residents.

== In contemporary culture ==
The television show The Simpsons is set in a town generically named "Springfield", without indicating a state. Creator Matt Groening has suggested in interviews that he chose the name because of its ubiquity; the show's intentionally contradictory information about the location of the town prevents matching the fictional Springfield to a real one. Groening revealed in 2012 the town referred to Springfield, Oregon, which is close to his hometown of Portland.

A "Springfield" was also the setting of the early 1950s radio and television program, Father Knows Best, as well as the 1950s soap opera The Guiding Light, which continued as the CBS soap opera Guiding Light through 2009.

== Locations named Springfield ==
Incorporated Urban Municipalities
Name	Country	State	Population (2020)
Springfield	USA	Missouri	169,176
Springfield	USA	Massachusetts	155,929
Springfield	USA	Illinois	141,394
Springfield	USA	Oregon	61,851
Springfield	USA	Ohio	58,662
Springfield	USA	Tennessee	18,782
Springfield Township, Union County	USA	New Jersey	17,178
Springfield	USA	Florida	8,075
Springfield	USA	Michigan	5,292
Springfield Township, Burlington County	USA	New Jersey	3,245
Springfield	USA	Kentucky	2,846
Springfield	USA	Georgia	2,703
Springfield	USA	Minnesota	2,027
Springfield	USA	South Dakota	1,914
Springfield	USA	Colorado	1,325
Springfield	USA	South Carolina	455
Springfield	USA	Louisiana	427

Incorporated Rural Municipalities
Name	Country	State/Province	Population (2021)
Rural Municipality of Springfield	Canada	Manitoba	16,142
Springfield	Australia	Tasmania	224

Unincorporated Municipalities
Name	Country	State	Population (2020/21)
Springfield	Canada	Ontario	761
Springfield	USA	Arkansas	223
Springfield	USA	California	-
Springfield, Kings County	Canada	New Brunswick	-
Springfield	Canada	Nova Scotia	-
Springfield	USA	Texas	-

Neighborhoods
Name	City	Country	State
Springfield/Belmont	Newark	USA	New Jersey
Springfield Gardens	New York City	USA	New York

== See also ==
- Springfield (disambiguation)
