= Stringfellow =

Stringfellow may refer to:

- Stringfellow (surname), a list of people
- Stringfellow Barr (1897–1982), American historian, author, and president of St. John's College
- Stringfellow (comics), a Marvel Comics character
- Stringfellow Hawke, a fictional character in the television series Airwolf
- Stringfellow Unit, a state prison in Texas
- Stringfellow Glacier, Graham Land, Antartica

== See also ==
- Stringfellow Acid Pits, a US Environmental Protection Agency Superfund site in California.
