= White Christmas Blues =

- The Simpsons episode
- Episode no.: Season 25; Episode 8
- Directed by: Steven Dean Moore
- Written by: Don Payne
- Production code: SABF01
- Original air date: December 15, 2013

Episode features
- Chalkboard gag: "I will not call my teacher "Prancer" and "Vixen""
- Couch gag: Christmas version of the regular opening, this time, as a retelling of The Night Before Christmas.

Episode chronology
← Previous "Yellow Subterfuge"	Next → "Steal This Episode"
- The Simpsons season 25

"White Christmas Blues" is the eighth episode of the twenty-fifth season of the American animated television series The Simpsons and the 538th episode of the series. It originally aired on the Fox network in the United States on December 15, 2013. The episode was the last written by Don Payne and was directed by Steven Dean Moore. It was the first Christmas episode since "Holidays of Future Passed" and the twelfth Christmas episode of the show.

In the episode, Springfield becomes a tourist hotspot after an accident involving the nuclear plant and the Springfield tire fire causes Springfield to be the only place in the country with snow at Christmas—and when Springfield's stores raise their prices, Marge turns their house into a bed and breakfast for the out-of-towners. The episode received negative reviews.

== Plot ==
As Marge scolds Homer for hanging up the house's Christmas decorations before taking down the ones for Halloween, a bored Bart and Lisa watch a television news broadcast in which Kent Brockman announces that all of America will have no snow at Christmas due to global warming. Soon, however, snow does begin to fall in Springfield; Professor Frink explains that due to the combination of radioactive steam from the nuclear power plant and airborne particulates from the city's tire fire, it is the only location in America with snow. Mayor Quimby declares the town a tourist attraction, and the residents quickly get into the holiday spirit as out-of-town travelers converge on Springfield.

Overwhelmed by the sudden crowds at the Kwik-E-Mart, and seeing the money spent by the tourists, Marge begins to feel like a failure since she cannot afford to spend lavishly on her family. As she returns to the house, a family drives past and offers to pay $300 per night to stay there. She hesitantly accepts the offer; Homer is surprised to find this other family in the house, but Marge explains the situation and persuades him to turn the house into a bed-and-breakfast for the duration of the holiday season. They take in more guests as Christmas approaches, but Marge becomes irritated at their constant requests and complaints over shoddy service and activities. On Christmas Day, Marge finds the guests gathered in the living room and thinks they are going to confront her, but instead they surprise her by singing Christmas carols.

Meanwhile, Lisa buys gifts for the family that are intended to make her feel good about herself - such as a bag of radish seeds for Homer, and a book for Bart - rather than to be something the recipients can use. She is appalled to find Bart burning the book soon afterward, but their argument leads her to see that her gift-giving effort was misguided. She sells the gift Bart gave her and buys him a tablet pre-loaded with books and apps he can enjoy, and he gives her some money to donate to charity.

== Production ==
During the title sequence, Edna Krabappel and episode writer Don Payne were shown with halos and angel wings. This was the final episode written by Payne to air. Executive producer Al Jean said that the producers wanted to honor Krabappel's voice actress Marcia Wallace and Payne. Wallace died in October 2013, and Payne died in March 2013.

== Reception ==
Dennis Perkins of The A.V. Club gave the episode a C, saying "While The Simpsons has always excelled at tossed-off sign gags and the like, this sequence is just a jumble of writers’ room bulletin board material—and not especially inspired material at that."

Teresa Lopez of TV Fanatic gave the episode two and a half stars out of five, saying "The Simpsons Christmas Specials have always been one of my favorites (along with the Treehouse of Horror), but tonight's episode was a disappointing, uneven, and (again!) overly familiar installment."

The episode received a 3.5 rating and was watched by a total of 8.48 million people, making it the most watched show on Animation Domination that night.
