= Springfield School =

Springfield School may refer to:

- Springfield School, Portsmouth, a secondary school in Portsmouth, Hampshire, England
- Springfield School, Richmond, a historic school building in Richmond, Virginia, United States

== See also ==
- Springfield High School (disambiguation)
- Springfield (disambiguation)
