= Springfield, Virginia (disambiguation) =

Springfield is a census-designated place in Fairfax County, Virginia.

Springfield, Virginia may also refer to:

- Springfield, Albemarle County, Virginia
- Springfield, Page County, Virginia
- Springfield, Westmoreland County, Virginia
- Springfield (Coatesville, Virginia), a historic home
- Springfield, West Virginia (formerly in Virginia prior to 1863)
