= Insane Clown Poppy =

- The Simpsons episode
- Episode no.: Season 12; Episode 3
- Directed by: Bob Anderson
- Written by: John Frink & Don Payne
- Production code: BABF17
- Original air date: November 12, 2000

Guest appearances
- Drew Barrymore as Sophie; Stephen King as himself; Joe Mantegna as Fat Tony; Jay Mohr as Christopher Walken; Amy Tan as herself; John Updike as himself

Episode features
- Chalkboard gag: "I will not surprise the incontinent"
- Couch gag: The family jumps towards the couch. In mid-leap, the picture freezes and turns 180 degrees, in a Bullet Time fashion. It then unfreezes, and the Simpsons drop onto the couch.
- Commentary: Mike Scully; Ian Maxtone-Graham; John Frink; Don Payne; Tom Martin; Matt Selman; Dan Castellaneta; Joe Mantegna; Bob Anderson; Joel H. Cohen

Episode chronology
| ← Previous "A Tale of Two Springfields" | Next → "Lisa the Tree Hugger" |
- The Simpsons season 12

"Insane Clown Poppy" is the third episode of the twelfth season of the American television series The Simpsons. It originally aired on the Fox network in the United States on November 12, 2000. In the episode, during an outdoor book fair, Krusty finds out he has a daughter (from a one-night stand with a soldier during the Gulf War), but loses her trust after gambling away her violin to Fat Tony, prompting Homer and Krusty to retrieve it.

The episode was written by John Frink and Don Payne as their second produced episode and their first written episode. Although originally produced for season 11 the episode was held over for season 12. The episode features guest stars Jay Mohr as Christopher Walken, Stephen King as himself, Amy Tan as herself, John Updike as himself and Joe Mantegna as recurring character Fat Tony.

Drew Barrymore also guest-starred as Sophie, Krusty the Clown's daughter in the episode. The episode features references to Bob Hope's famous USO shows. The episode has also received negative reviews from critics.

== Plot ==
Homer and Bart use fireworks to accomplish things Marge has told them to do: fix a stuck drawer, demolishing Santa's Little Helper's doghouse (while promising him another one would be built by January 2007), and attempting to fix Lisa's VCR, but end up destroying her room with fireworks instead. To make it up to her, the family spends a day at the Springfield Festival of Books for her birthday. There, they encounter famous authors such as Stephen King, Tom Wolfe, John Updike, and Amy Tan. While waiting in line for an autograph from Krusty, Bart strikes up a conversation with a girl named Sophie. When she gets to the front of the line, she reveals to Krusty that she is his daughter.

Sophie tells Krusty that he met her mother when she served as a soldier in the Gulf War, spending the night with her after a USO show; however, she dumped (and almost killed) Krusty the next day after he accidentally ruined her attempted assassination of Saddam Hussein to protect his comedy routine based on him and has hated Krusty and clowns ever since, proven by her apartment being filled with art depicting clowns getting harmed, much to Krusty's shock when he looks in. Krusty proves a distant and unemotional father, and on a trip to the beach, he sees Homer playing with the kids and asks him for advice on how to be a good parent. Krusty and his daughter begin to bond, and Sophie shows Krusty her prized violin and plays a song for him. That night, Krusty plays in a poker game with Fat Tony, where he is dealt four aces with a king kicker, but is forced to bet Sophie's violin after running out of money and betting his Rolex watch, and loses the hand to Fat Tony, who had a straight flush (2-3-4-5-6 of diamonds).

Sophie loses her trust in Krusty upon hearing the news, and Krusty turns to Homer for help; the two attempt to break into Fat Tony's mansion while a mafia summit is being held. They find a room filled with violin cases, but most of them are filled with weapons. They attempt to sneak out with the cases, but they fall to the ground and the guns go off, with Fat Tony's men returning fire. Krusty finds the violin, and the two escape. The next day, Krusty gives the violin back to Sophie, who is delighted to find that the case has been lined with money. The episode ends with Homer still being pursued by the mafia.

== Production ==
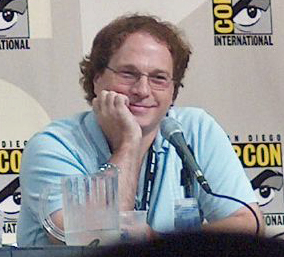
Don Payne (pictured) and John Frink originally wrote the episode for season 11.

The episode was written by John Frink and Don Payne and features guest stars Jay Mohr as Christopher Walken, Stephen King as himself, Amy Tan as herself, John Updike as himself and Joe Mantegna as recurring character Fat Tony. Drew Barrymore also guest-starred as Krusty the Clown's daughter in the episode. The episode went into a cycle where it was written in season 11 and produced for season 12.

Originally, Homer Simpson was the one who was surprised to have a long-lost daughter, but this was changed to Krusty as a suggestion from Mike Scully. During production Julie Kavner, the voice of Marge Simpson, went to Stephen King's radio station to record lines. Ian Maxtone-Graham was the one who suggested Jay Mohr as the real Christopher Walken could not make it to the recording.

== Cultural references ==
The episode title is a play on the Detroit, Michigan, based hip hop group, the Insane Clown Posse, and Krusty's line "do you want to get down with the clown?" is a reference to an Insane Clown Posse lyric. Krusty's performance at the USO show is a parody of Bob Hope who is famously known for his USO Shows. Originally Moe was supposed to say "Anny Deskanko" in a reference to Ani DiFranco. As in some previous episodes, there is a song featuring NRBQ. Fat Tony's real name is Marion, as was actor John Wayne.

In one scene, Krusty comes in with a problem and Homer asks Marge to play "devil's advocate". However, instead of taking up an argument, the next scene shows Homer playing a pinball game called "Devil's Advocate".

== Reception ==
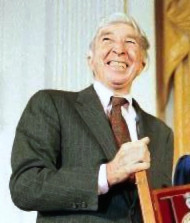
John Updike liked being on the show and tried not to laugh in the recording.

The episode has received negative reviews from critics. Colin Jacobson of DVD Movie Guide gave the episode a negative review saying "After two pretty good shows, Season 12 encounters mediocrity with “Poppy”. At no point does the program become poor, but it just lacks many real laughs. Outside of some amusing book fair cameos, this one fails to deliver much zing, and it tends to drag." Mark Naglazas of The West Australian called the episode "disappointing". He remarked that it and "A Tale of Two Springfields" (which premiered the same night in Australia) were "so surreal they would have Salvador Dalí scratching his head". However, he identified John Updike's guest appearance as an example of "sophisticated comedy". The Daily Telegraph said, "The episode gets lost in a quagmire of guest stars. The names range from the sublime to the ridiculous, or to be exact, from Pulitzer Prize-winning author John Updike to actor Drew Barrymore. The script seems designed only to fit in as many big names as possible. Oh for the days when it was the other way round and guest stars fitted in with the script." Judge Mac McEntire of DVD Verdict said the best moment in "Insane Clown Poppy" was Fat Tony and the violin.

=== John Updike's reflection ===
John Updike described the experience of appearing on The Simpsons to a crowd at the University of Cincinnati in 2001, and his reflections were recorded in the book Updike in Cincinnati. Updike exclaimed vigorously, "I can't claim to be a morbidly avid fan, but I'm basically well-disposed toward The Simpsons, and was flattered to be asked to be one of the many voices that they work into the endless saga of Springfield ... It was the kind of invitation to which you can't say no. I did notice that Amy Tan and Stephen King got many more lines in the episode than I did." He joked that he struggled with the chuckle he had to perform in the episode, saying, "How do you chuckle over a microphone ... to make it worthy of The Simpsons?"
