= Springfield High School =

Springfield High School may refer to:

- Springfield High School (Colorado)
- Springfield High School (Illinois)
- Springfield High School (Louisiana)
- Springfield High School of Science and Technology, Massachusetts
- Springfield High School (Minnesota)
- Springfield High School (Holland, Ohio)
- Springfield High School (Lakemore, Ohio)
- Springfield High School (New Middletown, Ohio)
- Springfield High School (Springfield, Ohio)
- Springfield High School (Oregon)
- Springfield High School (Pennsylvania)
- Springfield High School (Tennessee)
- Springfield High School (South Carolina)
- Springfield High School (Vermont)
- Springfield High School (Winnipeg)

Springfield High School may also refer to:

- Cherry Valley-Springfield Junior/Senior High School, Cherry Valley, New York
- Springfield Catholic High School (Missouri), Springfield, Missouri
- Springfield Central High School, Springfield, Massachusetts
- Springfield-Clark County Vocational School, Springfield, Ohio
- Springfield Gardens High School, Springfield Gardens, New York
- Springfield Southeast High School, Springfield, Illinois
- Springfield Township High School, Erdenheim, Pennsylvania
- West Springfield High School (Virginia), West Springfield CDP, Virginia
- West Springfield High School (Massachusetts), West Springfield, Massachusetts

== See also ==
- Springfield School (disambiguation)
- Springfield (disambiguation)
