= Industrial snow =

Type of artificial weather

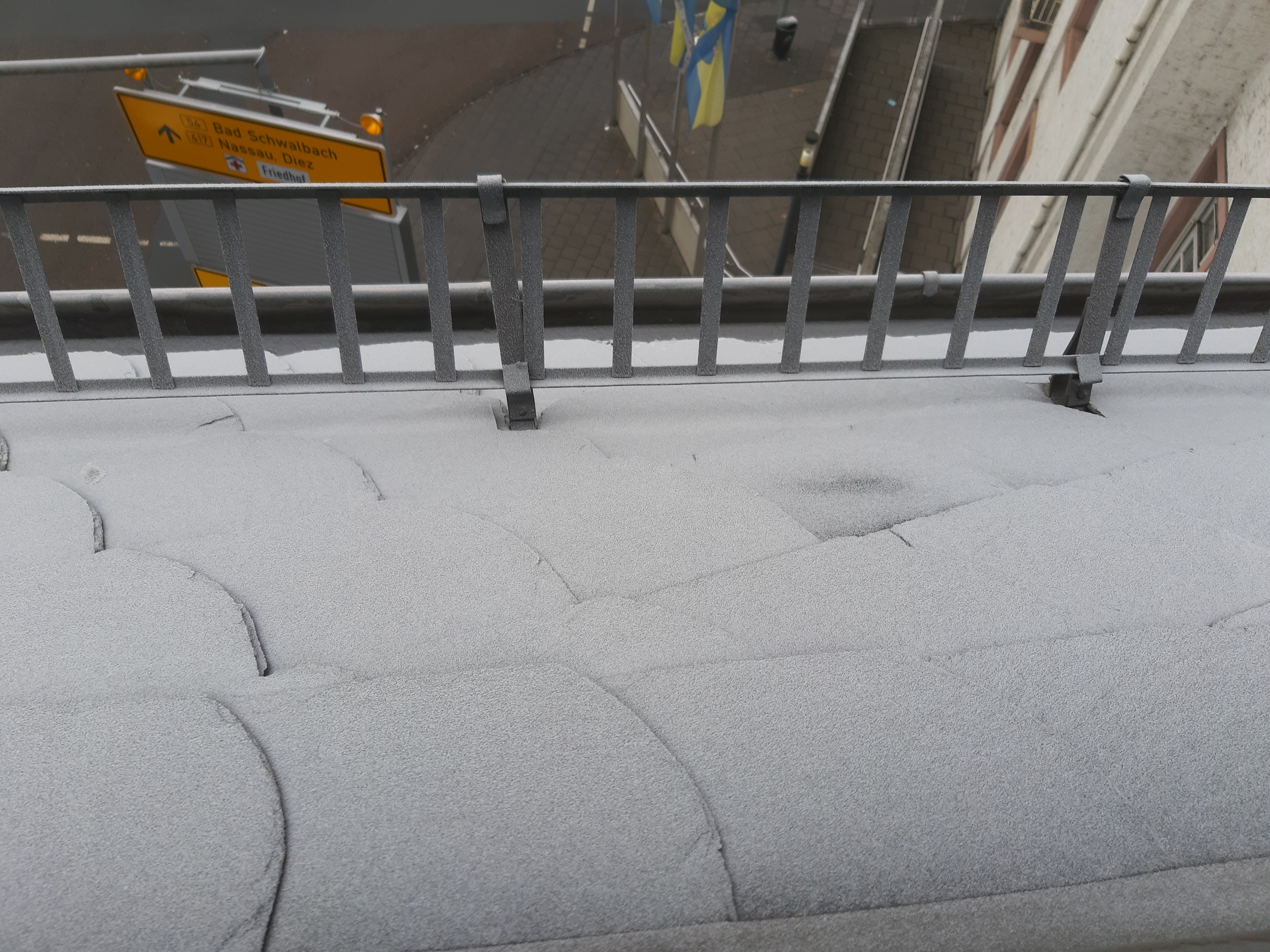
Industrial snow in Limburg (Hesse, Germany)

Industrial snow occurs near sources of heat, moisture and atmospheric particulate matter. It usually occurs at nighttime, in a combination of freezing temperatures, stagnant low stratus cloud or fog, and a temperature inversion. It falls from a low altitude as fine spikes of ice, having not had time to grow to the more usual shaped snowflake.

It has been observed in Switzerland, Austria, Germany, Northern Italy (where it is referred to as neve chimica, "chemical snow"), Hungary, in Canada (where it was referred to as refinery snow, or plant snow), the United Kingdom, and Texas.
