= Springfield, Wisconsin =

Springfield is the name of some places in the U.S. state of Wisconsin:

- Springfield, Dane County, Wisconsin, a town, the most populous Springfield in Wisconsin
- Springfield, Jackson County, Wisconsin, a town
- Springfield, Marquette County, Wisconsin, a town
- Springfield, St. Croix County, Wisconsin, a town
- Springfield, Walworth County, Wisconsin, an unincorporated community
- Springfield Corners, Wisconsin, an unincorporated community
