= Springford =

Springford is a surname. Notable people with the surname include:

- Norman Springford (born 1944), Scottish businessman
- Ruth Springford (1921–2010), Canadian actress
- Vivian Springford (1913–2003), American artist
