= Springfield, Westmoreland County, Virginia =

Unincorporated community in Virginia, US

Coordinates: 38°13′08″N 76°59′08″W

Springfield is an unincorporated community in Westmoreland County, in the U. S. state of Virginia.
