= Springfield, New Jersey =

Springfield, New Jersey may refer to:

- Springfield Township, Burlington County, New Jersey
- Springfield Township, Union County, New Jersey
  - Springfield (CDP), New Jersey
- Springfield/Belmont, Newark, New Jersey, a neighborhood of Newark

== See also ==
- Springfield (disambiguation)
