= North Springfield, Missouri =

Former city in Missouri, U.S.

Coordinates: 37°13′46″N 93°17′32″W

North Springfield, Missouri is a former city in Greene County. It was also known as 'North Town' or 'Moon Town'. The city was incorporated in 1871, a year after the St. Louis – San Francisco Railway constructed their railroad through an area north of Springfield instead of through Springfield itself. The main street through town was Commercial Street and its southern city limits were shared with Springfield at Division Street, named because of the division between the two cities. In 1887, Springfield and North Springfield voted to unite as one under the name of Springfield.
