= North Springfield =

North Springfield is the name of the following cities in the United States of America:

- North Springfield, Missouri, now part of Springfield, Missouri
- North Springfield, Oregon
- North Springfield, Vermont, village in Springfield, Vermont
- North Springfield, Virginia
