= Lessie Stringfellow Read =

American writer

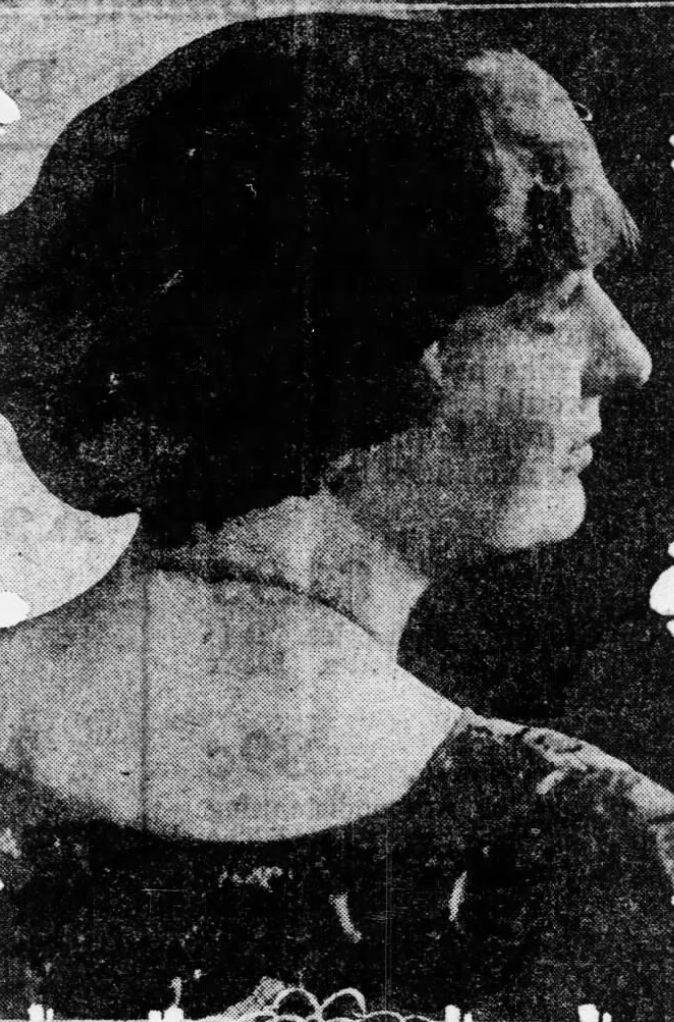
- Lessie Stringfellow Read, from a 1924 newspaper
- Born: Mabel Staples; January 3, 1891; Temple, Texas, U.S.
- Died: May 28, 1971 (aged 80); Fayetteville, Arkansas, U.S.
- Occupations: Writer, editor, publicist, suffragist

Lessie Stringfellow Read (January 3, 1891 – May 28, 1971), born Mabel Staples, was an American suffragist, writer, clubwoman, and editor based in Arkansas. She was national press chair of the General Federation of Women's Clubs. She was the managing editor of the Fayetteville Democrat from 1924 to 1945.

== Early life and education ==
Mabel Staples was born in Temple, Texas, the daughter of William Staples and Lillian Staples. Both her parents died when she was very young, and she was adopted by family friends, horticulturist Henry Martyn Stringfellow and Alice Johnston Stringfellow. The Stringfellows' only son, Leslie, died from malaria in his teens; she was renamed in his memory. She was educated in the Stringfellow home, sometimes by tutors.

== Career ==
=== Suffrage and clubwork ===
Read founded the Washington County Woman Suffrage Association, and was president of the Fayetteville Equal Suffrage Association. She was publicity chair of the Arkansas Federation of Women's Clubs. In the 1920s, Read was named national press chair of the General Federation of Women's Clubs (GFWC). She was founder and editor of the General Federation News for its first five years. She coordinated the GFWC's convention in Hot Springs, Arkansas, in 1918.

=== Journalism and local history ===
Read started writing for the Houston Chronicle when she was still in her teens. She was the city editor of the Fayetteville Democrat during World War I, and managing editor from 1924 until 1945, working closely with the paper's owner, Roberta Fulbright. "She does the feature work, she does the society work, she has even been known to help set type," according to a 1922 description of Read. Fulbright and Read helped establish the Good Government League in Washington County, an anti-corruption alliance of churches and civic organizations.

Read was a founding member of the Washington County Historical Society (WCHS) in 1951. The WCHS presents an annual Lessie Stringfellow Read Prize, for the best article about Fayetteville or Washington County history.

== Publications ==
- "Fairy Weavers" (1922, Good Housekeeping)
- "'Christmas Tree Lady' Asks Women's Aid in Conservation of Evergreens" (1924)
- "The Club Woman -- Here There and Everywhere" (1926)
- "The Gift" (1940, poem)

== Personal life ==
Stringfellow married a pharmacist, James J. Read, in 1910. Her husband disappeared in 1912. She lived with her adoptive mother, Alice Stringfellow, into the 1940s. She died in 1971, at the age of 80, in Fayetteville, Arkansas. The Arkansas State Archives holds some of Read's papers; there is also a small collection of manuscripts by Read at the University of Arkansas.
