= Don Payne (writer) =

American writer and film producer

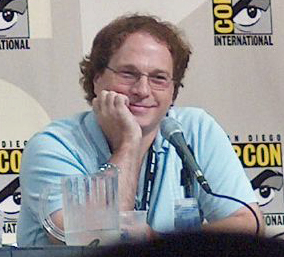
- Payne at the 2008 San Diego Comic-Con panel for The Simpsons
- Born: William Donald Payne; May 5, 1964; Wilmington, North Carolina, U.S.
- Died: March 26, 2013 (aged 48); Los Angeles, California, U.S.
- Education: University of North Carolina at Chapel Hill; University of California, Los Angeles (MFA)
- Occupations: Writer, producer

William Donald Payne (May 5, 1964 – March 26, 2013) was an American writer and producer. He wrote several episodes of The Simpsons after 2000, many of these with John Frink, whom he met while studying at the University of California, Los Angeles. The duo began their careers writing for the short-lived sitcom Hope and Gloria. Payne later moved into writing feature films, including My Super Ex-Girlfriend (2006), and co-wrote Fantastic Four: Rise of the Silver Surfer (2007), Thor (2011) and its sequel Thor: The Dark World (2013). Payne died from heart failure caused by bone cancer in March 2013.

== Early life ==
Payne was born on May 5, 1964, in Wilmington, North Carolina. He attended New Hanover High School, graduating in 1982; he had been class president. He attended the University of North Carolina at Chapel Hill, then transferred to and graduated from the University of California, Los Angeles, where he also received a Master of Fine Arts degree in screenwriting. Payne later taught the course.

== Career ==
=== Early career ===
He began his career as a writer for several sitcoms together with his writing partner at the time, John Frink. The two met at UCLA, where Frink was the boss of the Media Laboratory in which Payne worked. Payne has said to the website TheFutonCritic.com that "one day we were both trying to write individually so I said, 'why don't we pool our resources and write together and see what happens?'" In 2006, Payne told the Los Angeles Times that "I hooked up with a writing partner, John Frink, out of college. I wanted to do films. He wanted to do television." The pair reached the agreement that they would pursue a career in the medium that they first got a job offer in—whether it be film or television. They eventually ended up writing for television sitcoms such as Hope and Gloria (1995–1996), Men Behaving Badly (1997) and The Brian Benben Show (1998). These sitcoms were short-lived and Payne has deemed them as failures.

=== Further work ===
Payne and Frink joined the writing staff of the animated sitcom The Simpsons in 1998; their first script was the season twelve episode "Insane Clown Poppy", which aired in 2000. "Treehouse of Horror XI", another 2000 episode they wrote, was broadcast earlier than "Insane Clown Poppy", but was produced after. Payne said in an interview with TV Squad in 2006 that "My partner and I were actually working on one of a long string of failed sitcoms (and most sitcoms are failed sitcoms!) On the day a show is officially cancelled, it's kind of a tradition for the writing staff to go out to a restaurant, eat a nice meal, and drown their sorrows. On the way there, a writer named Jace Richdale (who had also worked on The Simpsons) told my partner and me that The Simpsons was looking for some writers. He wanted to know if we'd be interested in it, because he would recommend us. My jaw literally dropped. So he contacted the show-runner, a guy named Mike Scully, who read our spec script and met with us, then hired us on."

After a few years of working on The Simpsons together, Frink and Payne's writing partnership ended. They both continued to work on the show individually and Payne has described their split-up as amicable. Payne shared (with the show's other producers) four Primetime Emmy Awards for Outstanding Animated Program for his work on The Simpsons and won the Paul Selvin Award from the Writers Guild of America for writing the 2005 episode "Fraudcast News". He and Frink had been nominated for a WGA Award for Animation in 2003, for the episode "The Bart Wants What It Wants". Payne wrote or co-wrote 16 episodes of the show and worked as a producer on over 100; he wrote two final episodes, "White Christmas Blues" and "Labor Pains", which aired posthumously.

Payne later moved into writing feature films, as he had earlier desired, though continued to work on The Simpsons twice a week as a consulting producer. He wrote My Super Ex-Girlfriend (2006), and co-wrote Fantastic Four: Rise of the Silver Surfer (2007), Thor (2011) and Thor: The Dark World (2013). He was also attached to write Maximum Ride in 2013. My Super Ex-Girlfriend was released in 2006 and was his first feature film. He said in an interview with the website Cinematical that "I've always wanted to write features. That's why I moved to Los Angeles in the first place. I started writing with John Frink when I was in college at UCLA. He wanted to do TV, and that's where we got our first break. But my goal was always to write movies. And I've been a comic book geek from way back. So this romantic comedy with a superhero twist was a fitting first feature for me."

== Personal life and death ==
Payne had two sons and a daughter with his wife Julie. He had a brother John and a sister Suzanne.

Payne died from heart failure caused by his long multi-year battle with bone cancer at his home in Los Angeles on March 26, 2013, aged 48. The Simpsons' showrunner Al Jean stated: "Don was a wonderful writer and an even more wonderful man. He was beloved in the ‘Simpsons’ community and his untimely passing is terrible news to us all."

The film Thor: The Dark World, which he co-wrote, is dedicated to his memory, as is his final episode of The Simpsons, "White Christmas Blues".

== Writing credits ==
=== Television ===
Year	Title	Notes
1995	Hope and Gloria	Episode "A Fine ROM-ance"
1995	Pride & Joy	Episode "Brenda's Secret"
1995–1996	Can't Hurry Love	Episodes "Annie Get Your Armoire", "Glove Story" and "Valentine's Day Massacred"
1997	Men Behaving Badly	Episodes "Wet Nurse" and "Playing Doctor"
1998	The Brian Benben Show	Episode "House of Blues" (Also producer)
2000–2013	The Simpsons	Also producer, supervising producer, co-executive producer and consulting producer (List of episodes below)

- "Treehouse of Horror XI"(2000) (segment "Scary Tales Can Come True")
- "Insane Clown Poppy" (2000)
- "Bye Bye Nerdie" (2001)
- "Simpsons Tall Tales" (2001)
- "Treehouse of Horror XII" (2001) (segment "House of Whacks")
- "The Bart Wants What It Wants" (2002)
- "The Great Louse Detective" (2002)
- "Old Yeller Belly" (2003)
- "The Wandering Juvie" (2004)
- "Fraudcast News" (2004)
- "Thank God It's Doomsday" (2005)
- "Simpsons Christmas Stories" (2005)
- "Little Big Girl" (2007)
- "Love, Springfieldian Style" (2008)
- "Take My Life, Please" (2009)
- "Thursdays with Abie" (2010)
- "Labor Pains" (2013) (aired posthumously)
- "White Christmas Blues" (2013) (aired posthumously)

=== Film ===
- My Super Ex-Girlfriend (2006)
- Fantastic Four: Rise of the Silver Surfer (2007)
- Thor (2011)
- Thor: The Dark World (2013)
