= Springfield (The Simpsons) =

Fictional city in animated TV sitcom The Simpsons

- The Simpsons location
- A panoramic view of Springfield, as seen in The Simpsons Movie (2007)
- First appearance: "Good Night" (1987)
- Created by: Matt Groening
- Based on: Springfield, Oregon (name); Portland, Oregon (design); Springfield, Massachusetts (design)
- Genre: Animated sitcom

In-universe information
- Ruled by: Joe Quimby (Mayor)
- Location: Springfield County, United States (fictional)
- Locations: 742 Evergreen Terrace; Kwik-E-Mart
- Demonym: Springfieldianite

Springfield is the primary fictional setting of the American animated sitcom The Simpsons and related media. It is an average-sized, fictional suburban city in an unspecified, fictional state of the United States. The city's geography, surroundings, and layout are flexible, often changing to accommodate the plot of any given episode.

Springfield was inspired by a number of real-life locations, including creator Matt Groening's hometown of Portland, Oregon, the nearby town of Springfield, Oregon, and producer Mike Scully's hometown of Springfield, Massachusetts. However, in order to emphasize it as an example of "Anytown, USA", the location of the fictional Springfield remains a mystery. "Clues" regarding Springfield's climate, geology, distance from real cities, or political alignment, which are found in numerous episodes of the series, are intentionally contradictory and inaccurate.

In November 2025, an island version of Springfield was the main map for the Fortnite x Simpsons crossover mini season.

== Creation ==
The fictional city of Springfield was intended to represent "Anytown, USA", and not be derived from any specific real-life location. However, the producers acknowledge deriving inspiration from numerous locations, including The Simpsons creator Matt Groening's hometown of Portland, Oregon, and Mike Scully's hometown, Springfield, Massachusetts.

Springfield was named after Springfield, Oregon, which, as a child, Groening had believed to be the fictitious Springfield featured in the 1950s sitcom Father Knows Best. Groening did not intend to place the fictional Springfield in Oregon, contrary to a 2012 interview with him in Smithsonian magazine; he instead adopted the name for the setting of The Simpsons in the hope that "everyone will think it's their Springfield." Al Jean explained that the magazine "misinterpreted something I've heard him say for at least 10 or 20 years. He was inspired by growing up in Portland, but it's really an every town".

Groening liked Second City Television's setting of Melonville, a town with a large cast of recurring characters, and used it as inspiration for The Simpsons. He said, "I also figured out that Springfield was one of the most common names for a city in the U.S. In anticipation of the show's success, I thought, 'This will be cool; everyone will think it's their Springfield.' And they do".

=== Location ===
"The true location of Springfield is in any state but yours"

— Chalkboard gag, "Beware My Cheating Bart"

Because of the many contradictory statements made regarding Springfield in the show, the town cannot exist in a specific state. In The Simpsons Movie, Ned Flanders tells Bart that the state where Springfield is located is bordered by the states of Ohio, Nevada, Maine, and Kentucky – only Ohio and Kentucky are neighboring states in reality, and Nevada and Maine are at opposite ends of the US. In the episode "The Bob Next Door", Sideshow Bob drives Bart to an area known as "Five Corners", which is where the boundaries of five different states (including the one where Springfield is located) meet; while none of the states' names are given, there is no such division in the real-life United States.

The fictional city's unknown geography is a recurring joke in the series; the Dayton Daily News called it the "riddle wrapped in an enigma that is Springfield's location." Episodes frequently make fun of the fact that Springfield's state is unidentifiable, by adding further conflicting descriptions, obscuring onscreen map representations, and interrupting conversational references. (Note: One of the contradictory identifications takes place in Lisa the Iconoclast (season 7, episode 16) in which the grave of Democratic Presidential candidate and later UN ambassador under President John Fitzgerald Kennedy, Adlai Stevenson II, is shown to be located in Springfield's cemetery. The actual grave is in Evergreen Cemetery in Bloomington, Illinois. Like his father, Vice President Adlai Stevenson I, and his son, Senator Adlai Stevenson III, Stevenson was strongly connected to Illinois, having been Governor of the state from 1949 to 1953. The Stevenson grave is thus a "clue" pointing to Springfield being in Illinois.)

David Silverman, who directed the movie and various episodes of the series, joked that Springfield is located in the fictional state of "North Takoma". This is substantiated by the state abbreviations NT and TA used within the show. As of A Tale of Two Springfields (season 12, episode 2), the telephone area codes for Springfield are 636 (St. Charles County and Western St. Louis County, Missouri) and 939 (Puerto Rico).

To promote The Simpsons Movie, various actual towns and cities across the U.S. called Springfield competed to hold the premiere. The promotion was, whichever state sent in the most votes would be the winner and would officially be which state The Simpsons takes place in. Despite the smaller size of Vermont compared to other states, the town of Springfield, Vermont was chosen. In 2016, a New York Times study of the 50 TV shows with the most Facebook Likes found that "of all the Springfields in America, [The Simpsons] is most popular in Springfields in Virginia, Minnesota and New Jersey, and least popular in Springfields in Louisiana, Arkansas and Georgia".

In 2026, the running gag was playfully addressed in the Disney+ special "Yellow Mirror". In the episode, Homer Simpson—animated to look like an older version of series creator Matt Groening—is asked directly what state Springfield is in, and he answers "Oregon". Groening, originally from Portland, Oregon, had previously acknowledged that Springfield, Oregon, inspired the town's name, though the special's reveal is largely viewed as a tongue-in-cheek nod rather than a definitive rewriting of the town's intentionally impossible geography.

=== Fictional history ===
The episode "Lisa the Iconoclast" revealed that Springfield was founded by a group led by Jebediah Springfield (a cover identity for notorious pirate Hans Sprungfeld) who, after misinterpreting a passage in the Bible, left Maryland trying to find "New Sodom". After he refuses to found a town where men are free to marry their cousins, half of the group leave. The dissenters found the nearby town of Shelbyville, named after fellow pioneer Shelbyville Manhattan, and the two cities have remained rivals ever since.

Springfield reached its pinnacle in the mid-20th century when it became the home of the world's first Aquacar factory; one-half of the U.S. was said to wear Springfield galoshes, and the city's streets were literally paved with gold. However, the town's prosperity was short-lived. In a 1992 episode, a fictional Time cover story on Springfield is titled "America's Worst City", and in a 1996 episode, Newsweek called the town "America's Crud Bucket".

=== Topography ===
Springfield's fictional geography is shown to be comically varied and includes forests, meadows, mountain ranges, a desert, a glacier, beaches, badlands, canyons, swamps, a harbor, waterholes, and waterways. Major named geographical features include the Springfield Gorge, Springfield National Forest, the volcanic Mt. Springfield, the West Springfield Desert, which is claimed to be "three times the size of Texas", the Springfield Badlands, the gigantic Murderhorn Mountain, Springfield Glacier, Mt. Useful National Park, Springfield Mesa, Springfield Monument Park, and Springfield National Park.

The town's climate is usually depicted as dry and sunny, with a bright blue sky. However, in various episodes, it has been subject to many natural disasters, including heatwaves, blizzards, avalanches, earthquakes, acid rain, floods, hurricanes, lightning strikes, tornadoes, and volcanic eruptions.

Springfield's environment is shown as unusually polluted. Overflowing garbage forces the whole town – population and structures — to move five miles (8.0 km) away from the massive dump that the old town of Springfield had become. Springfield is also home to the state's largest self-sustaining tire fire, which has been burning continuously for many decades. Lake Springfield's pollution almost leads to the town's destruction by an Environmental Protection Agency (EPA) bomb in The Simpsons Movie, and pollution from the nuclear power plant has mutated the fish in the river, causing some to grow an extra eye. Its atmosphere is so polluted that, in one 1995 episode, it reduces a comet, that was large enough that it was assumed that it would completely destroy the town, to a rock the size of a chihuahua's head in just a few seconds.

Springfield is shown to feature a large numbered grid plan, ranging from streets at least as low as 3rd Street and at least as high as 257th Street.

=== Politics ===
The fictional mayor of Springfield is Joe Quimby, a Democrat. In the episode "Sideshow Bob Roberts", Sideshow Bob runs for mayor as a Republican and defeats Quimby, but Bob is later discovered to have committed electoral fraud. During the episode "The Old Blue Mayor She Ain't What She Used to Be", Marge Simpson becomes the mayor of the city for a short period. In "Walking Big & Tall", it is revealed that Hans Moleman was once the mayor of Springfield.

Krusty the Clown represents Springfield in Congress as a Republican. Previous representatives include Horace Wilcox, who dies of a heart attack while in office in "Mr. Spritz Goes to Washington", and Bob Arnold, who is forced to resign after Lisa exposes his corruption in "Mr. Lisa Goes to Washington".

Mary Bailey is the fictional governor of Springfield's state.

=== Sports ===
The town is home to a number of fictional sporting teams, including the Springfield Isotopes, a minor league baseball team which plays its home games at Duff Stadium; the Springfield Atoms football team at Springfield Stadium; the NBA's Springfield Excitement (formerly the Austin Celtics); and the Springfield Ice-O-Topes hockey team. Springfield resident Homer Simpson is also the owner of the Denver Broncos.

== Businesses ==
=== Kwik-E-Mart ===
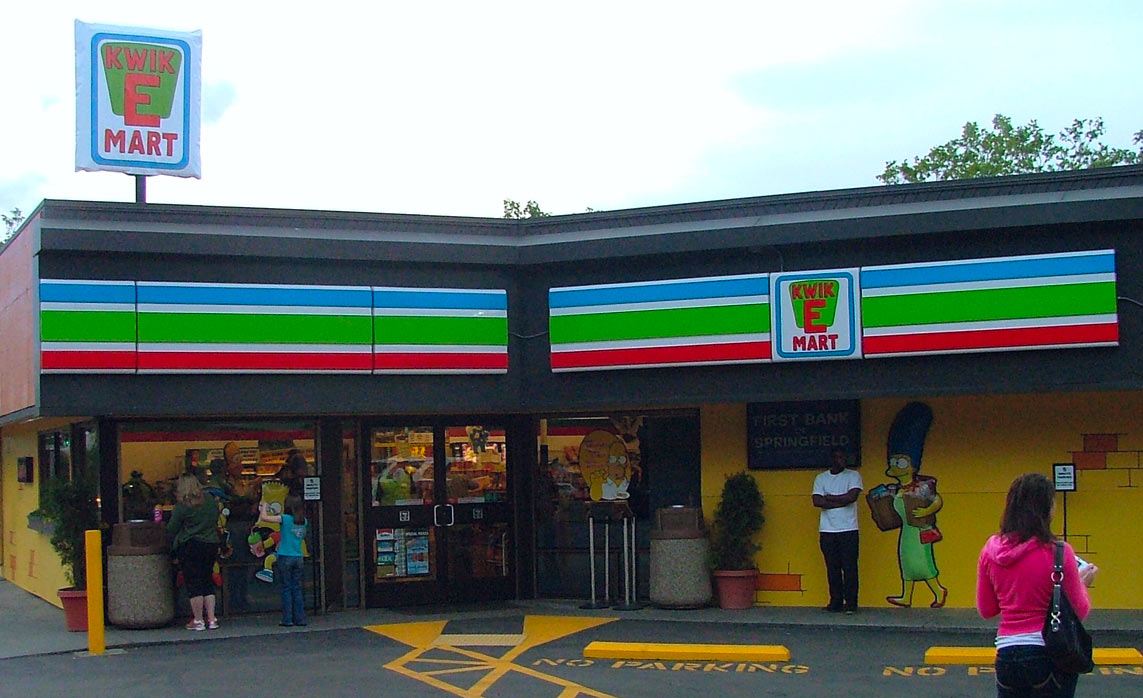
A Seattle 7-Eleven store transformed into a Kwik-E-Mart

Kwik-E-Mart is a fictional convenience store run by Apu Nahasapeemapetilon. The Kwik-E-Mart first appeared in the first-season episode "The Telltale Head" (although mentioned in "Bart the General" as the "Quick-e-Mart"). In "Stark Raving Dad", a street sign reading "Highland" is seen outside one of the front windows, in the same blue color as is used for signs for Highland Avenue in Los Angeles. Likewise, three buildings are visible that are similar to some of those that might be seen on that street: two low buildings with bars over the windows, and a third, also with barred windows, which has a mission-style roof and a sign reading "Smog Center".

The episode "Homer and Apu" suggests that Apu is an employee of the Kwik-E-Mart and shows him travelling to the Himalayas, where the Kwik-E-Mart head office is located, to ask for his job back after being fired. However, Apu mentions at a bachelor auction that he runs his own business in "The Two Mrs. Nahasapeemapetilons".

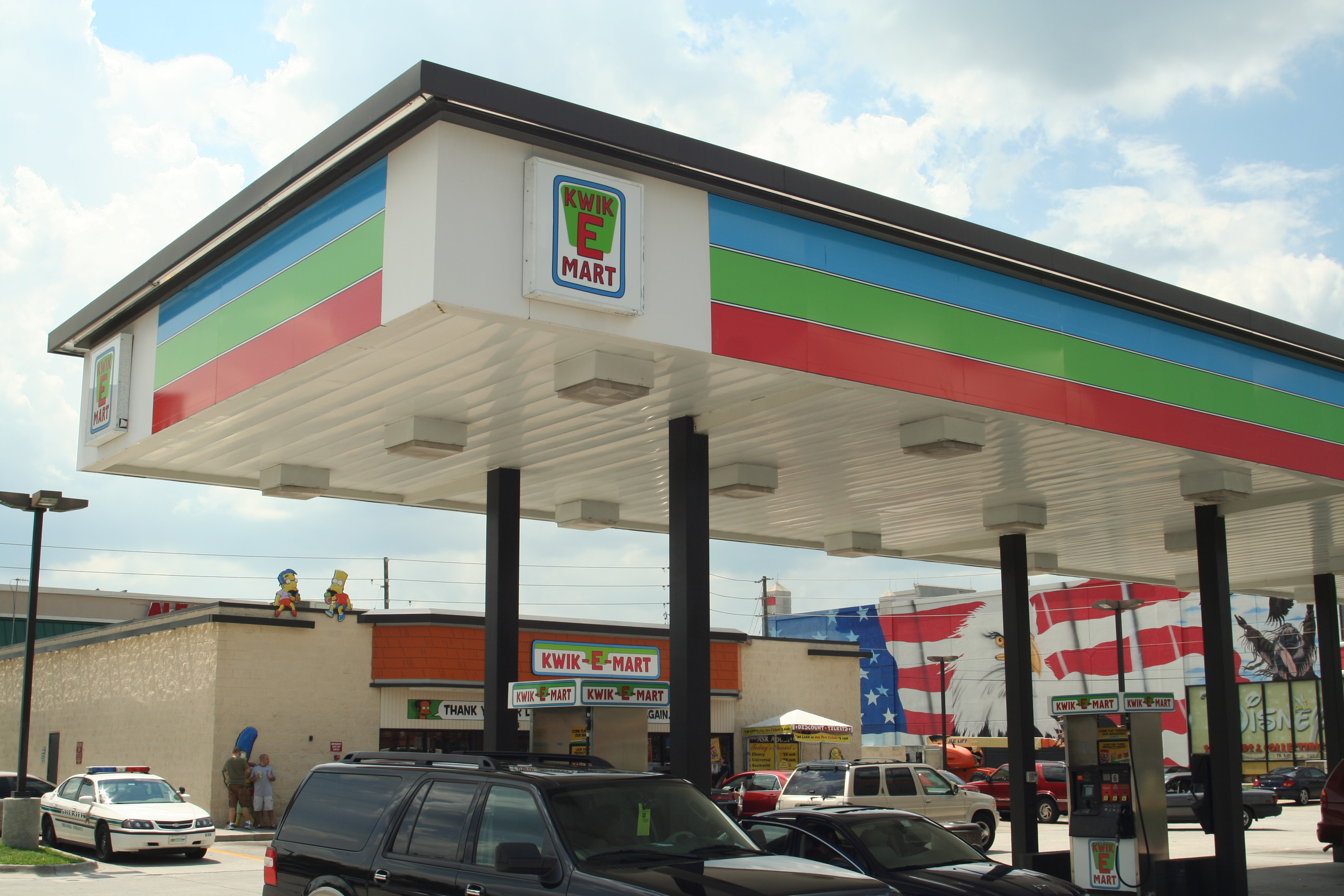
A Kwik-E-Mart in Orlando

In July 2007, convenience store chain 7-Eleven converted 11 of its stores in the United States and one in Canada into Kwik-E-Marts to promote the release of The Simpsons Movie. The locations of the renovated Kwik-E-Marts were: Bladensburg, Maryland/Washington, D.C.; Burbank, California; Chicago; Dallas; Denver; Henderson/Las Vegas; Los Angeles; Mountain View/San Francisco; New York City; Orlando/Lake Buena Vista, Florida; Seattle; and Vancouver/Coquitlam, British Columbia, Canada. These 12 locations, as well as the majority of other North American 7-Elevens, sold products found in The Simpsons, such as "Buzz Cola", "Krusty-O's", "Squishees", pink frosted "Sprinklicious doughnuts", and other Simpsons-themed merchandise. The Squishees were Slurpees that are sold in special collector cups, and the Krusty-O's were made by Malt-O-Meal. The promotion resulted in a 30% increase in profits for the changed 7-Eleven stores. This can be seen during the opening of The Simpsons Movie.

=== Moe's Tavern ===
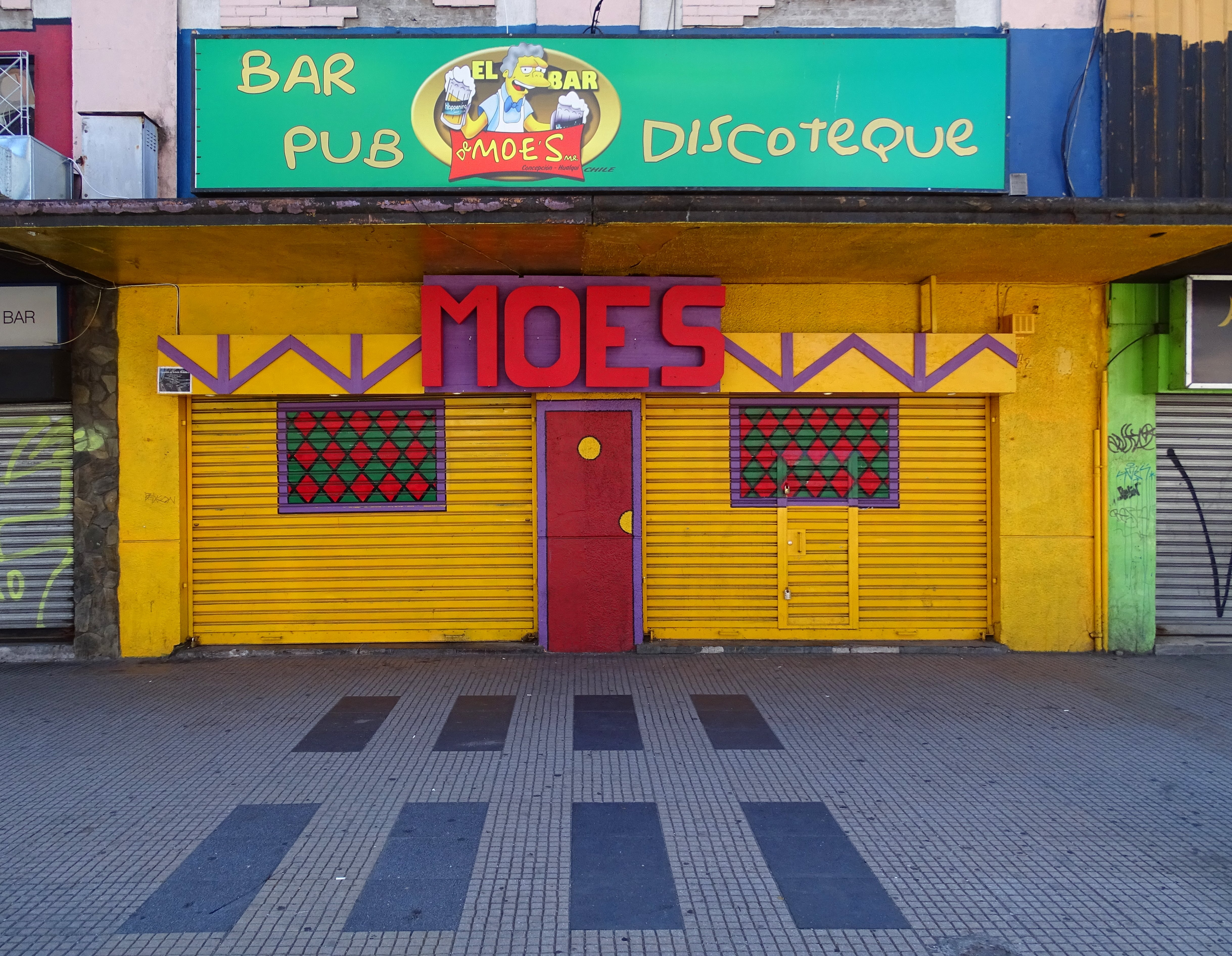
Moe's Bar in Concepción, Chile, based on images from The Simpsons

Moe's Tavern, or often simply referred to as "Moe's", is a fictional bar operated and named after the owner, Moe Szyslak. Moe's Tavern first appeared in the first episode of the series "Simpsons Roasting on an Open Fire". Homer Simpson, Lenny Leonard, and Carl Carlson often visit the bar after a day of work at the Springfield Nuclear Power Plant. Other frequent patrons of Moe's Tavern are Barney Gumble and the barflies Sam and Larry.

=== Springfield Nuclear Power Plant ===
The Springfield Nuclear Power Plant is a fictional two-unit pressurized water reactor nuclear power plant in Springfield owned by Charles Montgomery Burns. Among the plant's employees are Homer Simpson, Lenny Leonard, and Carl Carlson, and Burns' assistant Waylon Smithers. The plant is shown to be the key supplier of the city of Springfield's energy, and the carelessness of Mr. Burns and the plant's employees often endangers the residents and natural environment of Springfield. Mutated fish with more than two eyes are often shown in the lake behind the power plant, which has a large pipe pumping nuclear waste into it. There is a crow or raven shown living near the Power Plant, which caws whenever an establishing shot of the Power Plant is on screen. A running gag in earlier seasons was the poor security of the plant, with the outside security booth often going unmanned.

The design of Springfield Nuclear Power Plant is often rumored to be based on the troubled Trojan Nuclear Power Plant (closed in 1993 due to defects) near Matt Groening's hometown of Portland, Oregon, or the Hanford Site in southeastern Washington. However, Antonia Coffman, Groening's publicist, has said that the Springfield plant's design is generic and that "the Springfield Nuclear Power plant was not based on the Trojan Plant or any other power plant in the country."

=== The Android's Dungeon & Baseball Card Shop ===
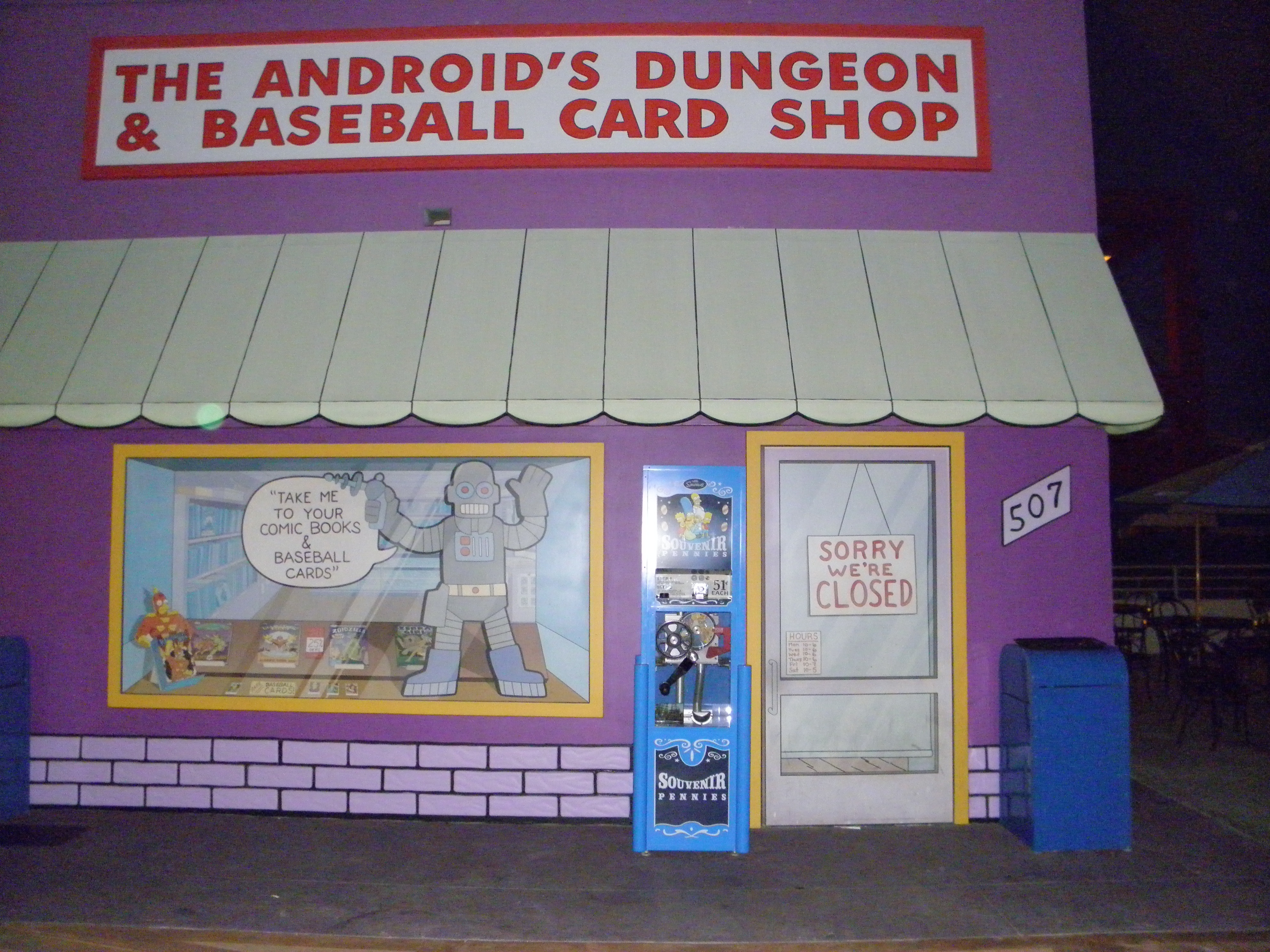
The Android's Dungeon & Baseball Card Shop, as seen in the Springfield section of Universal Studios Hollywood

The Android's Dungeon is a fictional comic book store owned by Comic Book Guy. The comic book store and its owner first appeared in the episode "Three Men and a Comic Book" when Bart sees a copy of the first issue of the Radioactive Man comic on sale for $100.

In the episode "Worst Episode Ever", Bart and Milhouse are given the job of running the comic book store after Comic Book Guy has a stress-induced heart attack and is instructed to try and gain a social life. During their brief tenure at the store, Bart and Milhouse discover a secret room filled with bootleg videotapes of extremely rare or illegal subjects. These tapes are later confiscated during a police raid on the store.

=== Barney's Bowl-A-Rama ===
Barney's Bowl-A-Rama is a fictional bowling alley in Springfield. It is owned by Barney Gumble's Uncle Al. In the episode "And Maggie Makes Three", Homer tells the family the story of Maggie's birth. In this story, Homer explains how he quit his job at Springfield Nuclear Power Plant to work at the Bowl-A-Rama, which was Homer's dream job, before returning to the plant when Maggie was born so that he could afford to care for her.

=== The Leftorium ===
The Leftorium is a fictional store in the Springfield Mall specializing in products for left-handed people. The store is owned by Ned Flanders, who first started the Leftorium in the episode "When Flanders Failed". Although business at the store initially went very poorly, it became significantly more successful when Homer recommended it to many of his left-handed friends.

The Leftorium had challenges in subsequent years, with Flanders discussing the business in several episodes. In the season 10 episode "Thirty Minutes over Tokyo", Ned mentions the competitor business "Leftopolis" next door. In the episode "Home Away from Homer", in a parody of Wal-Mart, Ned mentions the new megastore "Left-Mart" is threatening his business. The season 25 episode "White Christmas Blues" reveals that competition from the Southpaw Superstore forced Flanders to downsize to a mall cart, the "Leftorium Express", which he splits with a cosmetic saleswoman. In the season 29 episode "Left Behind", the Leftorium closes for good, leaving Flanders unemployed until he finds a new job as Bart Simpson's new teacher.

The writers had wanted to have Flanders own a failing business and the idea for the store was suggested by George Meyer. He got the idea from a friend whose family had owned a left-handed specialty store which had failed.

=== Springfield Mall ===
The Springfield Mall is a fictional shopping mall that features comical fictional stores and pastiches, such as the Happy Market, Cost-Mo, Girdles N' Such, Eye Caramba, I CAN'T BELIEVE IT'S A LAW FIRM!, The Ear Piercery, Happy Sailor Tattoo Parlor, Love Your Computer, Gum4Less, Popular Books, the Leftorium, Nick's Bowling Shop, Stoner's Pot Palace, Bookacchino's, Moe's Express (a mini version of Moe's Tavern), a Mapple Store (a parody of the Apple Store), numerous knockoff Starbucks coffee shops, and several Krusty Burgers.

=== Lard Lad Donuts ===
Lard Lad Donuts is a fictional donut shop in the town of Springfield, the store can be found in the Fast-Food Boulevard district. The Mascot Lard Lad can be seen as a statue in the car park of business. The statue is generally guessed among the community to be eight meters tall of a boy holding up a donut.

=== Krusty Burger ===
Krusty Burger is a fictional Burger joint located in Springfield and is also located in the Fast Food Boulevard district. It was founded by Krusty the Clown. The joint has had several competitions and promotions over the years, yet most of them failed miserably. Krusty Burger also has multiple locations in the Springfield Mall.

== Schools ==
=== Springfield Elementary School ===
Springfield Elementary School is a fictional local school attended by Bart Simpson, Lisa Simpson, and most other Springfield children. It teaches children from kindergarten through to sixth grade. Springfield Elementary is depicted as a grossly underfunded school that has the incompetence and apathy of its administration, teachers, staff, and students. It is portrayed within the show as a satire of publicly funded schools and education in the United States, an illustrative example and parody of the lengths taken by some schools to overcome the burden of underfunding.

Bart's class was taught by Edna Krabappel until her death in season 25. In "Left Behind", the Leftorium closes, leaving Flanders unemployed, and he returns to Springfield Elementary School, where he becomes Bart's new teacher, filling the void left by Krabappel's death. He holds that role until season 33, when Rayshelle Peyton (voiced by Kerry Washington) takes the job. Other students in this class include Milhouse van Houten, Nelson Muntz, Martin Prince, and Sherri and Terri. Lisa's class is taught by Elizabeth Hoover. Notable students in this class include Lisa's best friend, Janey Powell, and Ralph Wiggum.

The school's principal is Seymour Skinner. Other staff members include janitor Groundskeeper Willie, music teacher Dewey Largo, bus driver Otto Mann, and cafeteria chef Lunchlady Doris. The school district is overseen by Superintendent Gary Chalmers.

In 1994, the naming of a new, real-life elementary school in Greenwood, South Carolina, was left up to the students, and the name Springfield Elementary was chosen. The school board was unaware of the connection to The Simpsons until a protest by one group of parents, who argued that the character of Bart Simpson was a poor role model. The name stood, and the school opened in August 1994. The school was renamed in 2020 after civil rights movement leader and longtime Morehouse College president Benjamin Mays, who was born in the Greenwood area.

=== Colleges/universities ===
The fictional Springfield University is a large college which Homer attended in "Homer Goes to College". It teaches several different courses, including nuclear physics, arts management, and the meaning of cartoons. Springfield University also has a fierce rivalry with Springfield A&M University. In the episode "Faith Off", the nickname of the Springfield University football team is revealed to be the Nittany Tide—a reference to the Penn State Nittany Lions and Alabama Crimson Tide.

Springfield Agricultural and Mechanical (A&M) University is a rival institution of Springfield University. Carl Carlson is an A&M alumnus. Springfield A&M's mascot is a pig named Sir Oinks-A-Lot, who was kidnapped by Homer and his three student tutors as a prank in "Homer Goes to College".

Springfield Heights Institute of Technology focuses on the engineering sciences. Professor Frink is a college professor at the university, and it is from where Apu Nahasapeemapetilon earned his doctorate.

== Residential ==
=== Spinster City Apartments ===
Spinster City Apartments, sometimes referred to as Spinster Arms Apartments, is a fictional apartment building. Patty and Selma Bouvier, along with Selma's daughter Ling and their pet iguana Jub-Jub, live at number 1599.

=== Springfield Retirement Castle ===
The fictional Springfield Retirement Castle is Springfield's retirement home for the elderly. Some noted residents of the Castle include Abraham "Grampa" J. Simpson, Jasper Beardley, and Old Jewish Man.

For Grampa Simpson, the Retirement Castle is a lonely place to be. He often gets mad when his family does not come and visit him. The door features a sign reading 'Thank you for not discussing the outside world'. The most interesting way to pass time at the home is to "stake yourself out a good spot at the starin' window", which overlooks nothing but a barren tree, and bingo (the prize being a banana). The staff of the home has little to no respect for the residents, doing things like vacuuming their hair during "nap time", or switching their IV bags with their catheter bags when the former is empty, and the latter is full. In the episode "Old Money", Grampa inherits $106,000 from his girlfriend Beatrice "Bea" Simmons. He uses both this money and his winnings from a gambling junket to refurbish and redecorate the home and has the dining hall renamed in Bea's honor.

== Government ==
=== Springfield City Hall ===
The fictional City Hall of Springfield serves as the workplace of Mayor Quimby and the City Government. It is often the site of town meetings, where the citizens hold a vote to approve proposals in an attempt to fix an issue facing the city. These proposals generally cause havoc and create even more problems for the town to later deal with. The building is based on the Chelmsford, Massachusetts public library due to longtime The Simpsons background designer Lance Wilder, being a former Chelmsford resident.

== Landmarks ==
=== Five Corners ===
Five Corners is a fictional location, imagined as "the only geographic location in the US where five states meet". A boundary marker indicates the exact spot. In reality, no such place exists in the US; the location is a spoof of Four Corners. While on their road trip to Itchy & Scratchy Land, the Simpsons visit Five Corners, where they each "stand in five different states while holding hands". The location is visited again in "The Bob Next Door", where Sideshow Bob plots to kill Bart at the marker where the location's unique property would result in a lack of extraterritorial jurisdiction, explaining it as: "I can stand in one state, fire a gun in a second state, the bullet will travel through the third, hitting you in the fourth, so you fall dead in the fifth. No single act is against any law, but their sum total is the greatest murder since Snape killed Dumbledore!"

== Other towns ==
=== Shelbyville ===
The fictional city of Shelbyville is Springfield's rival. It was founded in 1796 by Shelbyville Manhattan, who advocated cousin marriage among his followers, causing a split between himself and Jebediah Springfield. An intense rivalry between the two cities continues today, especially in the sixth-season episode "Lemon of Troy", in which Shelbyville residents steal a prized lemon tree from Springfield. In several episodes, "Lemon of Troy" in particular, it is suggested that Shelbyville is to an extent a parallel version of Springfield. Shelbyville is also the city where Luann van Houten grew up. It also has at least one McDonald's restaurant, a Speed-E-Mart, Joe's Tavern, a nuclear power plant and a school. Per "Last Exit to Springfield", Shelbyville was at least briefly called "Morganville" during Abe Simpson's youth. According to The Simpsons Movie, Shelbyville is west of Springfield. It is the home of the button fly.

Shelbyville was ranked 10th in "The 10 Best Dystopias" in the December 2005 issue of Wired.

=== Capital City ===
Capital City (often spelled Capitol City in early episodes) is the fictional capital and largest city in the state in which the show is set. It is represented as a major urban center, hosting major sports events, conventions, and United Nations conferences. Its nickname is The Windy Apple (a joke by the show's writers, combining the nicknames of New York City's "The Big Apple" and Chicago's "The Windy City"). Landmarks include a Duff brewery, possibly mimicking the Anheuser-Busch brewery in St. Louis, the Cross-town suspension bridge resembling San Francisco's Golden Gate Bridge, the Capital City Stadium (an indoor stadium that is the home of the Capital City Capitals, a fictional Major League Baseball team whose mascot is the Capital City Goofball), the Capital City Amphitheatre (featuring Krusty the Clown), and the intersection of 4th Street and Avenue D. The Simpsons Movie places Capital City just to the north of Springfield.

=== Brockway ===
The fictional town of Brockway is mentioned by Lyle Lanley (voiced by Phil Hartman) as the municipality to which he has sold monorail systems ("Marge vs. the Monorail").

Brockway, Ogdenville, and North Haverbrook are also mentioned in episode 18 of the TV series Supernatural by Sam Winchester, as locations of past Shtriga activity.

=== Ogdenville ===
The fictional city of Ogdenville was first mentioned in "Marge vs. the Monorail", when Lyle Lanley claimed to have sold a monorail to Ogdenville. Ogdenville has also been mentioned in other episodes such as "Saddlesore Galactica", "Scenes from the Class Struggle in Springfield" and "To Surveil with Love". In "Eeny Teeny Maya Moe", Maya is from Ogdenville. Ogdenville has an outlet mall and is separated from Springfield by a rocky desert. In "Coming to Homerica", Ogdenville is a town of barley-producing farms that are shut down due to tainted barley being used in a new, vegetarian Krusty Burger. Ogdenvillians are composed of Norwegian immigrants with thick Norwegian accents. They also are big fans of the Minnesota Vikings due to the heavy incidence of Norwegian immigrants in the state of Minnesota. As a small easter egg, during a flu outbreak in Springfield, the hospital only received schemas in Norwegian, which was later confirmed via close-up. Series creator Matt Groening's background is Norwegian and German, which he has described as "two of the unfunniest ethnic groups in the history of the world".

=== North Haverbrook ===
The fictional town of North Haverbrook was first mentioned by Lyle Lanley in "Marge vs. the Monorail". Marge arrives in North Haverbrook and finds a desolate ghost town, where the faulty monorail derailed, causing a disaster, chasing away most of their residents and scaring away investors. The remaining North Haverbrook locals have since denied the monorail's existence, presumably blaming Lanley for the whole thing that ruined their town's reputation. Marge is met with hostility by the locals, including a woman who works at the 'Monorail Cafe'. She orders Marge to leave her town at once and never speak of the monorail anymore. A resident scientist from Germany, Sebastian Cobb, was the only one willing to help Marge out and save the passengers on the Springfield Monorail from suffering the same fate as North Haverbrook. Lanley is later attacked by the citizens of the town after his plane makes an unscheduled stop there.

North Haverbrook also appeared in "Little Big Girl". After Bart is awarded a driver's license, he gets sick of countless errands and goes for a drive and eventually finds North Haverbrook, and falls in love with a girl named Darcy. In this episode, the town appears to have recovered well from the monorail disaster, as it is now changed from a ghost town to a thriving community with multiple businesses that Bart enjoys. It has a romantic reputation. All signs of the monorail have also disappeared.

It also appears on a road sign as Snake drives towards Mexico with the Kwik-E-Mart on a flatbed trailer during "Marge in Chains".

=== Cypress Creek ===
Cypress Creek is a model town created for the workers of the Globex Corporation. It appears in the episode "You Only Move Twice". It is an affluent town and is home to many wildflowers (to which Lisa is allergic).

=== Guidopolis ===
In the episode "Midnight Towboy", Homer initially goes for a bottle of milk in a little town near Springfield named Guidopolis, where he then subsequently becomes a tow truck driver and is introduced to the vehicle recovery sector. The town is primarily inhabited by Italian-American greasers.

=== Little Pwagmattasquarmsettport ===
Little Pwagmattasquarmsettport is a fictional seaside town close to Springfield's State, where the Simpsons went for the Fourth of July in the Flanders's beach house; the town appears in the episode "Summer of 4 Ft. 2". Nicknamed "Little Pwag", the town contains many beaches and a large boardwalk section, and a fun fair open every summer.
