= Thornton Stringfellow =

American baptist pastor (1788–1869)

Thornton Stringfellow (March 6, 1788 – March 6, 1869) was the pastor of Stevensburg Baptist Church in Culpeper County, Virginia. He is perhaps best known for using Christianity to advocate for African-American slavery.

A native of Fauquier County, Stringfellow was ordained in 1814 and ministered in Fauquier and Culpeper Counties for the duration of his career. Besides slavery, he was an advocate for temperance, domestic missions, and Sunday Schools. He was a slaveholder himself. Stringfellow is buried in the Stevensburg churchyard.

== Bibliography ==
- A Brief Examination of Scripture Testimony on the Institution of Slavery, 1850
- Scriptural and Statistical Views in Favor of Slavery, 1856
- Slavery: Its Origin, Nature, and History, 1861
