= Springfield, Nova Scotia =

Community in Nova Scotia, Canada

Coordinates: 44.633°N 64.850°W

Springfield in Nova Scotia

Springfield is a community in the Canadian province of Nova Scotia, located between Middleton and Bridgewater. Springfield is in the centre of western Nova Scotia located on Trunk 10, 140 km west of Halifax.

Springfield lies within the Atlantic Upland. Springfield's economic development has been shaped largely by the forestry industry, but farming has also been an important occupation in this area. Most of the forests are privately owned, and many can best be called farm woodlots, or balsam fir Christmas tree farms. Many of the Christmas trees are shipped to other eastern Canadian provinces or to the United States.

The largest sawmill in Nova Scotia once was located in nearby Hastings. The mill was started in 1902 and began operating under the name the Davison Lumber Company in 1903. They built numerous railway lines in the area to haul logs which were connected to the Halifax and South Western Railway running between Bridgewater and Middleton. One rail line connected with Lake Pleasant and to the remote mill area of Crossburn, and as far east as South river Lake near Lake George. evidence of the old rail lines can still be found today. In 1905, the company built 30 houses, a large three-story cookhouse, an office, and a school. In 1914, Hastings, (the mill site was named after owner John M. Hastings of Pittsburgh, Pennsylvania) continued to boom with more houses, a warehouse, a store, a doctor's office, and a large clubhouse (which contained a bowling alley, two pool tables, a dressing room and a dance hall). The mill went bankrupt in the 1920s and a fire destroyed the mill in 1928. The fire consumed all the mill buildings and 35 of the remaining 55 houses. On September 10, 2005, a history book was launched in Springfield and a monument at the old lumber mill site was unveiled.

Today, Springfield has a Canada Post Office, a general store, a fire hall, garages, a small number of forest related businesses, farms, a large armed forces campground on Lake Pleasant, a ball field and picnic park on Springfield Lake, and a Baptist Church. Local shopping and schools are in New Germany (16 km away) and many people commute to Bridgewater for employment and larger stores. There, the largest employer is the Michelin Tire Plant.

Lake Pleasant and Springfield Lake are located in the community; both lakes are popular cottage and camping areas that offer trout and salmon fishing, boating, swimming, and year-round hiking. Pleasant Lake is the site of the Lake Pleasant Campers Club, under the auspices of the 14 Wing Greenwood recreation director. It features campsites, canoe rentals and other amenities. Membership is open to serving members and reservists of the Canadian military.

== Climate ==
Climate data for Springfield
| Month | Jan | Feb | Mar | Apr | May | Jun | Jul | Aug | Sep | Oct | Nov | Dec | Year |
|---|---|---|---|---|---|---|---|---|---|---|---|---|---|
| Record high °C (°F) | 17.8 (64.0) | 18.3 (64.9) | 26 (79) | 27.2 (81.0) | 32.5 (90.5) | 36.1 (97.0) | 36.1 (97.0) | 35.6 (96.1) | 33.3 (91.9) | 26.1 (79.0) | 21.1 (70.0) | 16 (61) | 36.1 (97.0) |
| Mean daily maximum °C (°F) | −1.5 (29.3) | −1 (30) | 3.3 (37.9) | 9.2 (48.6) | 16.2 (61.2) | 21.1 (70.0) | 24.3 (75.7) | 23.7 (74.7) | 19.1 (66.4) | 12.9 (55.2) | 6.8 (44.2) | 1.2 (34.2) | 11.3 (52.3) |
| Mean daily minimum °C (°F) | −10 (14) | −9.6 (14.7) | −5.4 (22.3) | −0.1 (31.8) | 5.1 (41.2) | 10 (50) | 13.6 (56.5) | 13.3 (55.9) | 9.1 (48.4) | 3.9 (39.0) | −0.5 (31.1) | −6.6 (20.1) | 1.9 (35.4) |
| Record low °C (°F) | −30 (−22) | −29 (−20) | −26 (−15) | −20.6 (−5.1) | −6.7 (19.9) | −1.1 (30.0) | 1.7 (35.1) | −4.4 (24.1) | −3.3 (26.1) | −8.9 (16.0) | −16.1 (3.0) | −27.8 (−18.0) | −30 (−22) |
| Average precipitation mm (inches) | 156.8 (6.17) | 113.4 (4.46) | 144.8 (5.70) | 110.7 (4.36) | 104.2 (4.10) | 103.2 (4.06) | 100.1 (3.94) | 92.6 (3.65) | 111.3 (4.38) | 122.7 (4.83) | 148.3 (5.84) | 160.2 (6.31) | 1,468.2 (57.80) |
Source: Environment Canada
