= Hastings, Annapolis County, Nova Scotia =

Community in Nova Scotia, Canada

Coordinates: 44°38′29.56″N 64°52′5.12″W

Hastings in Nova Scotia

Hastings is a community in the Canadian province of Nova Scotia, located in Annapolis County.

Hastings was the scene of a thriving lumber operation, E. D. Davison & Sons, between 1905 and 1921, after which it was abandoned. Its peak of production was during World War I when the mill averaged 170,000 board feet of lumber in a 10-hour shift. Producing 7.8 million board feet of lumber annually, it was at the time the busiest saw milling operation in Nova Scotia. The mill and a small town were built on the east side of Mill Lake, now known as Springfield lake. The town dispersed after the mill burnt down in 1928.

== See also ==
- Springfield, Nova Scotia
