= Springfield Plantation =

Springfield Plantation or Springfield Plantation House may refer to:

- Springfield Plantation (Louisville, Kentucky)
- Springfield Plantation (Fayette, Mississippi)
- Springfield Plantation House (Fort Mill, South Carolina)
