= West Springfield =

West Springfield may refer to:

- West Springfield, Massachusetts, United States
- West Springfield, Virginia, United States
- West Springfield, a fictional location in The Simpsons episode "Half-Decent Proposal"
