= Springfield Township =

Springfield Township may refer to:

== Illinois ==
- Springfield Township, Sangamon County, Illinois

== Indiana ==
- Springfield Township, Allen County, Indiana
- Springfield Township, Franklin County, Indiana
- Springfield Township, LaGrange County, Indiana
- Springfield Township, LaPorte County, Indiana

== Iowa ==
- Springfield Township, Cedar County, Iowa
- Springfield Township, Kossuth County, Iowa
- Springfield Township, Winneshiek County, Iowa

== Michigan ==
- Springfield Township, Kalkaska County, Michigan
- Springfield Township, Oakland County, Michigan

== Minnesota ==
- Springfield Township, Cottonwood County, Minnesota

== Missouri ==
- Springfield Township, Greene County, Missouri
- Springfield Township, Henry County, Missouri

== New Jersey ==
- Springfield Township, Burlington County, New Jersey
- Springfield Township, Union County, New Jersey

== North Dakota ==
- Springfield Township, Towner County, North Dakota

== Ohio ==
- Springfield Township, Clark County, Ohio
- Springfield Township, Gallia County, Ohio
- Springfield Township, Hamilton County, Ohio
- Springfield Township, Jefferson County, Ohio
- Springfield Township, Lucas County, Ohio
- Springfield Township, Mahoning County, Ohio
- Springfield Township, Muskingum County, Ohio
- Springfield Township, Richland County, Ohio
- Springfield Township, Ross County, Ohio
- Springfield Township, Summit County, Ohio
- Springfield Township, Williams County, Ohio

== Pennsylvania ==
- Springfield Township, Bradford County, Pennsylvania
- Springfield Township, Bucks County, Pennsylvania
- Springfield Township, Delaware County, Pennsylvania
- Springfield Township, Erie County, Pennsylvania
- Springfield Township, Fayette County, Pennsylvania
- Springfield Township, Huntingdon County, Pennsylvania
- Springfield Township, Mercer County, Pennsylvania
- Springfield Township, Montgomery County, Pennsylvania
- Springfield Township, York County, Pennsylvania

== See also ==
- Springfield (disambiguation)
- Springfield Township High School, Erdenheim, Pennsylvania
- Springfield Township School District, Montgomery County, Pennsylvania
