= The Stone Roses discography =

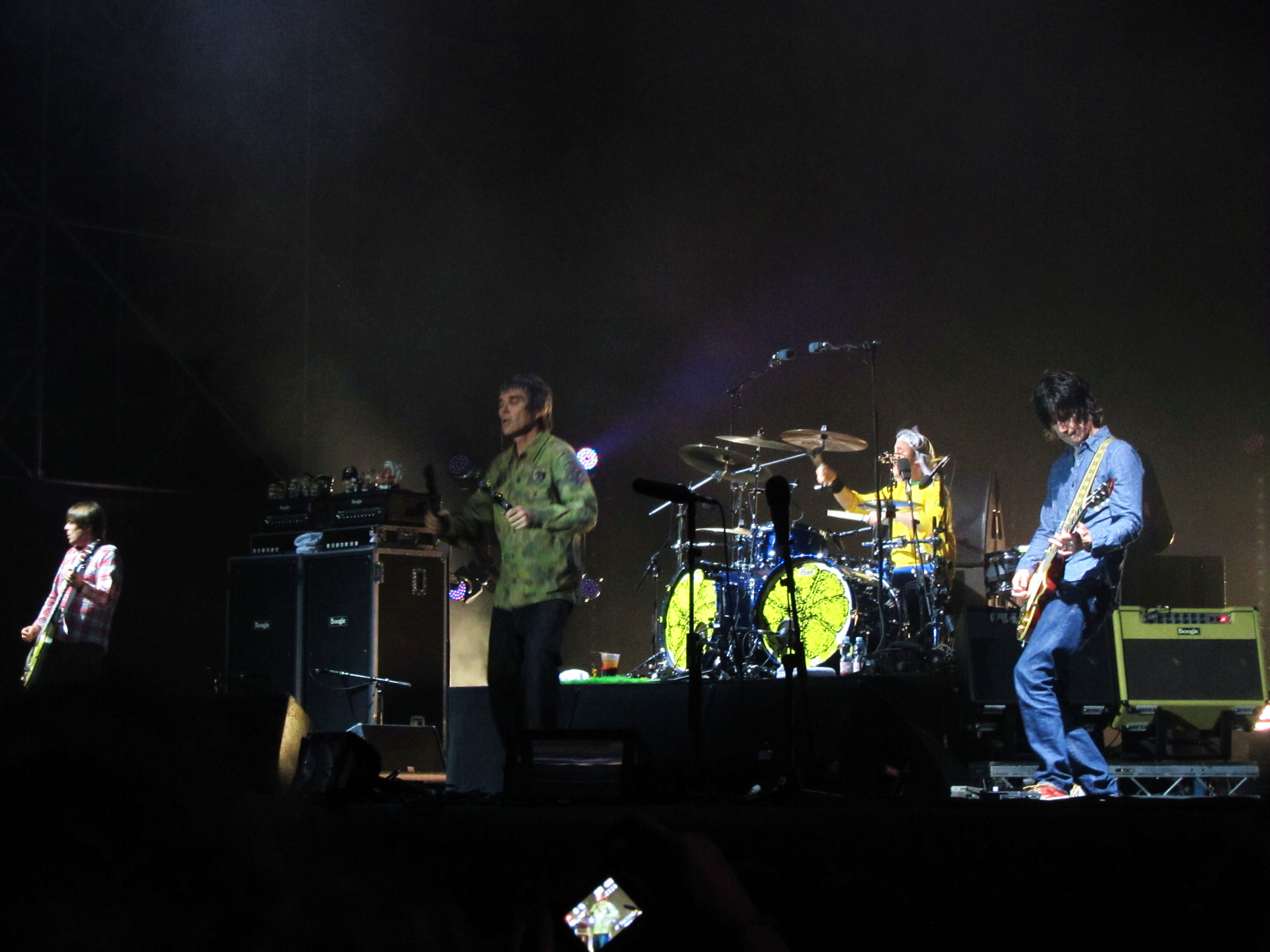
- The Stone Roses in concert in Milan 17 July 2012
- Studio albums: 2
- Compilation albums: 6
- Singles: 15
- Video albums: 1
- Music videos: 12

The discography of the English rock band the Stone Roses consists of two studio albums, six compilation albums, fifteen singles, one video album, and twelve music videos.

== Albums ==
=== Studio albums ===
Year	Details	Peak chart positions										Certifications (sales thresholds)
Year	Details	UK	AUS	CAN	GER	IRL	JPN	NLD	NZL	SWE	US	Certifications (sales thresholds)
1989	The Stone Roses: Label: Silvertone (#502); Released: 2 May 1989; Format: CD, cassette, LP, MD	5	36	62	—	3	82	44	11	30	86	BPI: 5× Platinum
1994	Second Coming: Label: Geffen (#24503); Released: 5 December 1994; Format: CD, cassette, LP	4	17	24	57	53	24	61	38	26	47	BPI: 2× Platinum

=== Compilation albums ===
Year	Details	Peak chart positions			Certifications (sales thresholds)
Year	Details	UK	AUS	IRL	Certifications (sales thresholds)
1992	Turns Into Stone: Label: Silvertone; Released: 20 July 1992; Format: CD, cassette, LP, 2×LP	32	189	—	BPI: Gold
1995	The Complete Stone Roses: Label: Silvertone; Released: 15 May 1995; Format: CD, 2×CD, cassette, 2×LP	4	109	—	BPI: Platinum
1996	Garage Flower: Label: Garage Flower Records; Released: 25 November 1996; Format: CD, cassette, LP	58	—	—	
2000	The Remixes: Label: Silvertone; Released: 21 November 2000; Format: CD, 2×LP	41	—	—	BPI: Silver
2002	The Very Best of The Stone Roses: Label: Silvertone; Released: 4 November 2002; Format: CD, 2×LP	13	—	9	BPI: 4× Platinum
2010	Collection: Label: Sony Music; Released: 30 August 2010; Format: CD	—	—	—	BPI: Gold

== Singles ==
List of singles, with selected chart positions and certifications, showing year released and album name
Title	Year	Peak chart positions								Certifications	Album
Title	Year	UK	AUS	CAN	IRE	NED	NZL	SWE	US Alt.	Certifications	Album
"So Young/Tell Me"	1985	—	—	—	—	—	—	—	—		Non-album singles
"Sally Cinnamon"	1987	—	—	—	—	—	—	—	—		Non-album singles
"Elephant Stone"	1988	8 (Note: "Elephant Stone" did not originally chart on the UK Singles Chart, however it did reach 8 when reissued in 1990.)	86 (Note: "Elephant Stone" and "Made of Stone" did not originally chart on the Australian singles chart, however it did reach 86 when reissued in 1990.)	—	4 (Note: "Elephant Stone" did not originally chart on the Irish Singles Chart, however it did reach 4 when reissued in 1990.)	—	—	—	—		Non-album singles
"Made of Stone"	1989	20 (Note: "Made of Stone" originally charted at 90 on the UK Singles Chart, however it did reach 20 when reissued in 1990.)	86	—	12 (Note: "Made of Stone" did not originally chart on the Irish Singles Chart, however it did reach 12 when reissued in 1990.)	—	—	—	—	BPI: Silver	The Stone Roses
"She Bangs the Drums"	1989	34 (Note: "She Bangs the Drums" originally charted at 36 on the UK Singles Chart, however it did reach 34 when reissued in 1990.)	128	—	—	—	37	—	9	BPI: Platinum	The Stone Roses
"Fools Gold/What the World Is Waiting For"	1989	8	13	—	9	10	—	—	5	BPI: Platinum	Non-album single
"I Wanna Be Adored" (US only)	1989	—	—	—	—	—	—	—	18		The Stone Roses
"Sally Cinnamon" (alternative version)	1989	46	—	—	—	—	—	—	—	BPI: Gold	Non-album singles
"One Love"	1990	4	79	—	6	65	28	—	9		Non-album singles
"I Wanna Be Adored" (rest of world)	1991	20	141	—	21	—	—	—	—	BPI: Platinum	The Stone Roses
"Waterfall"	1991	27	—	—	—	—	—	—	—	BPI: Platinum	The Stone Roses
"I Am the Resurrection"	1992	33	—	—	—	—	—	—	—	BPI: Platinum	The Stone Roses
"Fools Gold" (remix)	1992	73	—	—	—	—	—	—	—		Non-album singles
"Standing Here/ Elephant Stone" (US promo only)	1992	—	—	—	—	—	—	—	—		Non-album singles
"Love Spreads"	1994	2	36	67	8	—	23	13	2	BPI: Gold	Second Coming
"Ten Storey Love Song"	1995	11	103	—	—	—	—	—	—	BPI: Silver	Second Coming
Fools Gold '95	1995	25	—	—	—	—	—	—	—		Non-album single
"Begging You"	1995	15	111	—	30	—	—	—	—		Second Coming
"Fools Gold" (remix)	1999	25	87	—	—	—	—	—	—		Non-album singles
"All for One"	2016	17	—	—	49	—	—	—	—		Non-album singles
"Beautiful Thing"	2016	21	—	—	61	—	—	—	—		Non-album singles
"—" denotes a recording that did not chart or was not released in that territory.

== Extended plays ==
Year	Details	Peak chart positions
Year	Details	AUS
1996	Crimson Tonight (live EP): Label: Geffen; Released: January 1996; Format: CD	152

== Other certified releases ==
Title	Year	Certifications (sales thresholds)	Album
"This Is the One"	2026	BPI: Gold	The Stone Roses
"Mersey Paradise"	2025	BPI: Silver	Turns Into Stone

== Videography ==
=== Music videos ===
Year	Title	Director
1989	"She Bangs the Drums"	
1989	"Fools Gold"	
1989	"I Wanna Be Adored"	
1989	“Sally Cinnamon”	
1990	"She Bangs the Drums" (second version)	
1990	"One Love"	
1991	"Waterfall"	
1992	"Standing Here"	
1994	"Love Spreads" (UK version)	Mike Clark
1994	"Love Spreads" (US version)	Steven Hanft
1995	"Ten Storey Love Song"	Sophie Muller
1995	"Begging You"	David Geffen

=== Home Videos ===
Year	Video details
1991	Blackpool Live: Released: 4 November 1991; Labels: Silvertone; Formats: VHS, LD
1995	The Complete Stone Roses: Released: December 1995; Label: Wienerworld Presentations; Format: VHS
2004	The Stone Roses: Released: 28 June 2004; Labels: Silvertone; Formats: DVD
