= The Remixes (The Stone Roses album) =

Remix album by the Stone Roses
- Released: 30 October 2000
- Recorded: 1988–1998
- Genre: Madchester
- Label: Silvertone
- Producer: John Leckie, Peter Hook, Martin Hannett

The Stone Roses chronology
Garage Flower (1996)	The Remixes (2000)	The Very Best of the Stone Roses (2002)

Professional ratings
Review scores
Source	Rating
AllMusic	2/5 stars
The Encyclopedia of Popular Music	2/5 stars

The Remixes is a compilation album by English rock band the Stone Roses. It was released on 30 October 2000 and features remixes by various producers including Utah Saints and Paul Oakenfold.

== Track listing ==
1. "Shoot You Down" (The Soul Hooligan remix) – 4:47
2. "Fools Gold" (Top Won mix) – remixed by A Guy Called Gerald – 7:12
3. "Made of Stone" (808 State mix) – 4:58
4. "Waterfall" (12" remix) – remixed by Paul Oakenfold & Steve Osborne – 5:35
5. "One Love" (Utah Saints remix) – 5:01
6. "I Wanna Be Adored" (Bloody Valentine edit) – remixed by Rabbit in the Moon – 7:40
7. "Fools Gold" (Grooverider's mix) – 6:05
8. "I Am the Resurrection" (Jon Carter remix) – 7:02
9. "Waterfall" (Justin Robertson's mix) – 6:20
10. "She Bangs the Drums" (Elephant remix) – 6:18
11. "Elizabeth My Dear" (Kinobe remix) – 4:53
12. "Elephant Stone" (Mint Royale remix) – 3:28

== Charts ==
=== Weekly charts ===
Chart (2000)	Peak position
UK Albums (OCC)	41
