= The Very Best of the Stone Roses =

Greatest hits album by the Stone Roses
- Released: 4 November 2002
- Recorded: 1987–1994
- Genre: Alternative rock, Madchester, blues rock
- Length: 78:36
- Label: Silvertone
- Producer: John Leckie, Peter Hook, Simon Dawson, Paul Schroeder

The Stone Roses chronology
| The Remixes (2000) | The Very Best of the Stone Roses (2002) | Collection (2010) |

Professional ratings
Review scores
| Source | Rating |
|---|---|
| AllMusic | 4.5/5 stars |
| The Encyclopedia of Popular Music | 4/5 stars |
| NME | 5/5 stars |
| Stylus Magazine | A+ |

The Very Best of the Stone Roses is a compilation album released by Silvertone Records in 2002. It features most of their singles plus album tracks including "Breaking into Heaven" and "This Is the One", all of which were remastered for this album. It charted at #19 in the United Kingdom and spent nine weeks in the Top 75.

The Very Best of is a fairly comprehensive compilation in that it gathers all the Stone Roses' best known tracks. The track listing was decided upon by band members. The previous compilation The Complete Stone Roses had been criticized for not including material from the group's second album, whilst including inferior edits and alternative versions of many songs.

Not only does the compilation contain six songs from their 1989 debut but the album is structured to open and close with the same songs in their album versions. It was re-released in 2012 following their reunion when it reached 20 in the charts. As of July 2012, it has sold 552,577 copies in the United Kingdom.

== Track listing ==
All tracks are written by Ian Brown and John Squire except where noted

| No. | Title | Original album | Length |
|---|---|---|---|
| 1. | "I Wanna Be Adored" | The Stone Roses, 1989 | 4:53 |
| 2. | "She Bangs the Drums" | The Stone Roses | 3:50 |
| 3. | "Ten Storey Love Song" (Squire) | Second Coming, 1994 | 4:23 |
| 4. | "Waterfall" | The Stone Roses | 4:39 |
| 5. | "Made of Stone" | The Stone Roses | 4:16 |
| 6. | "Love Spreads" (Squire) | Second Coming | 5:47 |
| 7. | "What the World Is Waiting For" | Non-album single, 1989 | 3:51 |
| 8. | "Sally Cinnamon" (original 12" version) | Non-album single, 1987 | 3:25 |
| 9. | "Fools Gold" (12" version) | Non-album single, 1989 | 9:54 |
| 10. | "Begging You" | Second Coming | 4:53 |
| 11. | "Elephant Stone" (12" version) | Non-album single, 1988 | 4:51 |
| 12. | "Breaking into Heaven" (short version; Squire) | Second Coming | 6:59 |
| 13. | "One Love" (7" version) | Non-album single, 1990 | 3:35 |
| 14. | "This Is the One" | The Stone Roses | 5:00 |
| 15. | "I Am the Resurrection" | The Stone Roses | 8:13 |

== Charts ==
=== Weekly charts ===
| Chart (2002) | Peak position |
|---|---|
| Irish Albums (IRMA) | 9 |
| UK Albums (OCC) | 19 |

=== Year-end charts ===
| Chart (2006) | Position |
|---|---|
| UK Albums (OCC) | 163 |
| Chart (2020) | Position |
| UK Albums (OCC) | 100 |

== Certifications ==
| Region | Certification | Certified units/sales |
|---|---|---|
| United Kingdom (BPI) | 4× Platinum | 1,200,000^{‡} |
^{‡} Sales+streaming figures based on certification alone.
