= The Time Has Come to Shoot You Down... What a Sound =

Studio album by the Flaming Lips and friends
- Released: November 29, 2013

The Flaming Lips and friends chronology
The Terror (2013)	The Time Has Come to Shoot You Down... What a Sound (2013)	With a Little Help from My Fwends (2014)

The Time Has Come to Shoot You Down... What a Sound is a covers album by the Flaming Lips and friends. It is a reworking of the Stone Roses' self-titled album. Produced by the Flaming Lips, it was released on November 29, 2013, as part of the year's releases for Black Friday.

The track listing follows that of the original 1989 UK release of The Stone Roses, finishing with "Fools Gold" (frequently added as an album closer on re-releases of The Stone Roses).

== Track listing ==
All songs written by Ian Brown and John Squire.

1. "I Wanna Be Adored"
2. "She Bangs the Drums"
3. "Waterfall"
4. "Don't Stop"
5. "Bye Bye Badman"
6. "Elizabeth My Dear"
7. "Song for My Sugar Spun Sister"
8. "Made of Stone"
9. "Shoot You Down"
10. "This Is the One"
11. "Resurrection"
12. "Fools Gold"
