= The Complete Stone Roses =

Greatest hits album by the Stone Roses
- Released: 15 May 1995
- Recorded: 1985–1990
- Genre: Alternative rock, Madchester
- Length: 73:53
- Label: Silvertone
- Producer: John Leckie, Peter Hook, Martin Hannett

The Stone Roses chronology
Second Coming (1994)	The Complete Stone Roses (1995)	Garage Flower (1996)

The Complete Stone Roses is a compilation of the first ten singles and selected B-sides by the English rock band the Stone Roses. It was released in 1995 without the band's input by their record company Silvertone, with whom they were embroiled in a protracted legal battle to terminate their five-year contract.

The album features a complete collection of the band's singles and B-sides before their second studio album for the label, as well as earlier releases for other labels.

== Critical reception ==
Professional ratings
Review scores
Source	Rating
AllMusic	4.5/5 stars
The Encyclopedia of Popular Music	3/5 stars
The Queen's Journal	5/5 stars
Uncut	5/5 stars

The Media Research Information Bureau placed The Complete Stone Roses tenth on their list of "Top Ten Albums".

== Track listing ==
All tracks are written by Ian Brown and John Squire.

No.	Title	Length
1.	"So Young" (double A-side with "Tell Me", 1985)	3:30
2.	"Tell Me" (double A-side with "So Young", 1985)	3:50
3.	"Sally Cinnamon" (A-side, single mix, recorded 1987, first released 1989)	2:50
4.	"Here It Comes" (B-side from original "Sally Cinnamon", 1987)	2:40
5.	"All Across the Sand" (B-side from original "Sally Cinnamon", 1987, incorrectly listed as "All Across the Sands")	2:40
6.	"Elephant Stone" (A-side, 7" version, 1988)	3:00
7.	"Full Fathom Five" (B-side from "Elephant Stone", 1988)	3:18
8.	"The Hardest Thing in the World" (B-side from "Elephant Stone", 1988)	2:39
9.	"Made of Stone" (A-side, LP version, 1989)	4:11
10.	"Going Down" (B-side from "Made of Stone", 1989)	2:46
11.	"She Bangs the Drums" (A-side, single mix, 1989)	3:42
12.	"Mersey Paradise" (B-side from "She Bangs the Drums", 1989)	2:44
13.	"Standing Here" (B-side from "She Bangs the Drums", 1989)	5:05
14.	"I Wanna Be Adored" (A-side, edit, 1989)	3:28
15.	"Waterfall" (A-side, 7" remix, 1991)	3:36
16.	"I Am the Resurrection" (A-side, 7" remix, 1992)	3:41
17.	"Where Angels Play" (B-side from "I Wanna Be Adored", recorded 1988–89, first released 1991)	4:15
18.	"Fools Gold" (double A-side with "What the World Is Waiting For", 7" version, 1989)	4:15
19.	"What the World Is Waiting For" (double A-side with "Fools Gold", 1989)	3:55
20.	"Something's Burning" (B-side from "One Love," edit, recorded 1990, incorrectly listed as "Something Burning")	3:37
21.	"One Love" (A-side, 7" version, 1990)	3:40

Catalogue numbers

- 2LP: Silvertone ORE LP 535
- Cassette: Silvertone ORE C 535
- CD: Silvertone ORE CD 535

=== Bonus CD tracks ===
The first 60,000 copies of the CD came with a bonus disc featuring:

No.	Title	Length
1.	"I Am Without Shoes"	1:23
2.	"Groove (Black Magic Devil Woman)"	3:26

Catalogue number

- 2CD: Silvertone ORE Z CD 535

== Personnel ==
The Stone Roses

- Ian Brown – vocals
- John Squire – guitar
- Andy Couzens – guitar (tracks 1, 2)
- Pete Garner – bass (tracks 1–5)
- Mani – bass (tracks 6–21)
- Reni – drums, backing vocals

Production

- Martin Hannett – producer (1, 2)
- Chris Nagle, John Hurst – engineering (1, 2)
- The Stone Roses – producer (3–5)
- Peter Hook – producer (6–8)
- John Leckie – producer (9, 11–21)
- The Garage Flowers – producer (10, bonus disc)
- Paul Schroeder – producer (10)
- John Squire – painting
- David Saunders – design
- Paul Slattery – photography
- John Harris – liner notes

== Charts ==
=== Weekly charts ===
Chart (1995)	Peak position
Scottish Albums (OCC)	3
UK Albums (OCC)	4
UK Physical Albums (OCC)	4

Chart (1999)	Peak position
UK Independent Albums (OCC)	5

== Certifications ==
Region	Certification	Certified units/sales
United Kingdom (BPI)	Platinum	300,000^{^}
^{^} Shipments figures based on certification alone.
