= The Stone Roses Live: Blackpool Empress Ballroom =

- Directed by: Geoff Wonfor
- Starring: Ian Brown; John Squire; Gary Mounfield; Alan Wren
- Distributed by: Windsong International, Silvertone Records
- Release date: 1991
- Running time: 58 minutes
- Country: United Kingdom
- Language: English

The Stone Roses Live: Blackpool Empress Ballroom was a live performance by The Stone Roses, released on 4 November 1991 in the UK. It contained a series of tracks recorded at a concert in Blackpool, Lancashire, England on 12 August 1989. The release was directed by Geoff Wonfor, who also worked with Paul McCartney, Eurythmics and on the TV show The Tube. It is considered to be one of their best and most well-known live performances.

== Track listing ==
1. "I Wanna Be Adored"
2. "Elephant Stone"
3. "Waterfall"
4. "Sugar Spun Sister"
5. "Made of Stone"
6. "She Bangs the Drums"
7. "Where Angels Play"
8. "Shoot You Down"
9. "Going Down"
10. "Mersey Paradise"
11. "I Am the Resurrection"

The band's debut standalone single "Sally Cinnamon" and the "She Bangs the Drums" B-side "Standing Here" were both played at the gig, but only low-quality bootleg recordings have surfaced; the exact reason they were not included in the professionally filmed performance along with all the other songs remains unclear.

== Personnel ==
- Ian Brown – vocals, bongos
- John Squire – guitar
- Mani – bass guitar
- Reni – drums, backing vocals
- Cressa – dancing
