= Turns into Stone =

Compilation album by the Stone Roses
- Released: 20 July 1992
- Recorded: 1988–1990
- Genre: Madchester
- Length: 53:48
- Label: Silvertone
- Producer: John Leckie, Peter Hook

The Stone Roses chronology
The Stone Roses (1989)	Turns into Stone (1992)	Second Coming (1994)

Turns into Stone is a compilation album by the English rock band the Stone Roses, released in 1992. It consists of singles and B-sides that did not feature on their self-titled debut album. The compilation reached number 32 on the UK Albums Chart.

The album's release was surrounded by controversy, as the Roses were in the middle of a legal battle with their then-record label, Silvertone. An injunction prevented the band from releasing any new material for several years afterward, during which Silvertone released several singles without the band's consent, including two alternate versions of "Fools Gold", along with tracks from the first album that the band had never intended to be singles (such as the edited version of "I Am the Resurrection" featuring a drum machine instead of Reni's distinctive drumming).

Despite this, the album is seen in a positive light by Roses fans because it collects the extended versions of many of their best-known non-album songs onto one CD, before a best-of compilation was even available.

The title of the album is taken from the final lines of "One Love": "What goes up must come down/Turns into dust or turns into stone".

In August 2009, the album's tracks were remastered by John Leckie and included as "The B-sides" on the 20th anniversary collectors edition re-release of the Stone Roses self-titled debut album and the remastered album went on to be released separately in September 2012 by Sony Music.

== Critical reception ==
Professional ratings
Review scores
Source	Rating
AllMusic	4/5 stars
The Encyclopedia of Popular Music	3/5 stars
The New Rolling Stone Album Guide	3/5 stars
Uncut	4/5 stars

Writing for The Justice, Douglas Newman remarked that "while the songs possess the appeal of the Stone Roses's earlier work, the album gasps with monotony and fails to deliver the novel excitement of their debut". Colin Jackson of Record Collector included Turns into Stone in his top 5 list based on readers' record collection.

== Track listing ==
No.	Title	Length
1.	"Elephant Stone" (12″ version)	4:53
2.	"The Hardest Thing in the World"	2:39
3.	"Going Down"	2:46
4.	"Mersey Paradise"	2:44
5.	"Standing Here"	5:05
6.	"Where Angels Play"	4:15
7.	"Simone"	4:24
8.	"Fools Gold" (12″ version)	9:53
9.	"What the World Is Waiting For"	3:55
10.	"One Love" (12″ version)	7:45
11.	"Something's Burning"	7:50

Catalogue numbers

- LP: Silvertone ORE LP521
- LP: Music On Vinyl MOVLP628 (180g Remaster)
- LP: Modern Classics Recordings MCR 915 (2 × 180g Remaster)
- CD: Silvertone ORE CD521
- CD: Silvertone Records / Sony Music 88725467042 (2012 Remaster)
- Cassette: Silvertone ORE C521

== Charts ==
=== Weekly charts ===
Chart (1992)	Peak position
UK Albums (OCC)	32

Chart (1998)	Peak position
Scottish Albums (OCC)	94
UK Independent Albums (OCC)	9
UK Physical Albums (OCC)	80

Chart (2025)	Peak position
UK Albums Sales (OCC)	98
UK Record Store (OCC)	39

== Certifications ==
Region	Certification	Certified units/sales
United Kingdom (BPI)	Gold	100,000^{^}
^{^} Shipments figures based on certification alone.
