= International 2 =

Former nightclub in Manchester, England

Coordinates: 53.4542°N 2.2116°W

The International 2 was a live music venue located at Plymouth Grove in Manchester, England. It existed at the same time as The Haçienda and other clubs in the late 1980s that were gaining in popularity. Gareth Evans owned the nightclub and was also the manager of The Stone Roses who also frequented the club.

A partial list of artists who appeared at the Internationals 2 can be found at Songkick.

The International 2 was notable as being the live music component of the Manchester music scene and being the base for The Stone Roses who were credited as producing one of the finest British albums of all time. This was written whilst they were part of the scene at the International 2. The nightclub is featured in the first seconds of a Stone Roses promotional video for their single "Sally Cinnamon". The story of the International 2 is documented as part of the Blood on the Turntables series.

The International 2 was co-owned by Matthew Cummings, and he was also the co-manager of The Stone Roses.

The International 2 was sold to Manchester businessman and nightclub owner Paul Coombes in the summer of 1990 and he promoted all the shows up to the closure of the venue in the summer of 1992 after which he sold the site on for redevelopment

The International 2 building was demolished and replaced by a gated apartment building complex.
