= Sally Cinnamon =

Single by the Stone Roses
- B-side: "Here It Comes": "All Across the Sand"
- Released: May 1987
- Recorded: 1987
- Genre: Madchester, jangle pop
- Length: 3:27
- Label: FM Revolver
- Songwriters: Ian Brown, John Squire

The Stone Roses singles chronology
"So Young/Tell Me" (1985)	"Sally Cinnamon" (1987)	"Elephant Stone" (1988)

"Sally Cinnamon" is a song by the English rock band the Stone Roses, released in 1987 as their second single, before bassist Mani joined the band. The 7" version made its first album appearance in 1995, and the 12" version in 2002.

The single entered the UK Indie Chart in June 1987, spending thirty-nine weeks in the chart in total, peaking at number three. When re-released in 1989, it entered the UK Singles Chart, where it spent seven weeks, peaking at number 46.

When the single was re-released in 1989 by FM Revolver boss Paul Birch, the band objected to a promotional video made without their involvement, with Ian Brown calling it "insulting". On 30 January 1990, while travelling to Rockfield Studios in Wales, the band visited FM Revolver's Wolverhampton headquarters and threw paint over Birch, the offices, and several cars, as well as causing further damage to the property. John Squire later stated that the stunt had been his idea. After leaving Wolverhampton, the band continued to Rockfield Studios, where they recorded "Something's Burning", later released as the B-side to their next single, "One Love". The following day, members of the band were arrested and later appeared at Wolverhampton Magistrates' Court charged with criminal damage estimated at £10,000.

== Lyrics ==
The lyrics tell a story of unreciprocated love, initially framed as a tribute to Sally Cinnamon before the final verses reveal that Sally herself is in love with another woman.

== Track listing ==
All songs written by Brown/Squire.

=== 1987 release ===
12-inch vinyl (Black/FM Revolver 12 REV36)

All tracks are written by Brown, Squire.

No.	Title	Length
1.	"Sally Cinnamon"	3:27
2.	"Here It Comes"	2:41
3.	"All Across the Sand"	2:45

=== 1989 and 1992 reissues ===
7-inch vinyl (Black/FM Revolver REV36)

All tracks are written by Brown, Squire.

No.	Title	Length
1.	"Sally Cinnamon"	2:53
2.	"Here It Comes"	2:41

12-inch vinyl (Black/FM Revolver 12 REV36)

All tracks are written by Brown, Squire.

No.	Title	Length
1.	"Sally Cinnamon"	3:27
2.	"Here It Comes"	2:41
3.	"All Across the Sands"	2:45

Cassette (Black/FM Revolver REV MC 36), CD (Black/FM Revolver REV XD 36)

All tracks are written by Brown, Squire.

No.	Title	Length
1.	"Sally Cinnamon" (Single mix)	2:53
2.	"Sally Cinnamon" (12-inch single mix)	3:27
3.	"All Across the Sands"	2:45
4.	"Here It Comes"	2:41

The tracklisting on the back of the 1992 CD release has "All Across The Sands" and "Here It Comes" listed the wrong way round.

=== 2005 EP issue ===
CD&DVD (Black/FM Revolver REV XD 636)

All tracks are written by Brown, Squire.

Disk 1 (CD)
No.	Title	Length
1.	"Sally Cinnamon" (Single mix)	2:53
2.	"Here It Comes"	2:41
3.	"All Across the Sands"	2:45
4.	"Sally Cinnamon" (12-inch single mix)	3:27

Disk 2 (DVD)
No.	Title	Length
1.	"Sally Cinnamon" (Video)

== Charts ==
Chart	Peak position
UK Indie Chart	3
UK Singles Chart	46

== Certifications ==
Region	Certification	Certified units/sales
United Kingdom (BPI)	Silver	200,000^{‡}
^{‡} Sales+streaming figures based on certification alone.
