= Garage Flower =

Compilation album by the Stone Roses
- Released: 25 November 1996
- Recorded: August 1985
- Genre: Indie rock
- Length: 44:11
- Label: Garage Flower
- Producer: Martin Hannett

The Stone Roses chronology
The Complete Stone Roses (1995)	Garage Flower (1996)	The Remixes (2000)

Professional ratings
Review scores
Source	Rating
AllMusic	3/5 stars
The Encyclopedia of Popular Music	2/5 stars
Uncut	2/5 stars

Garage Flower is a compilation album by the English rock band the Stone Roses.

The album was recorded in mid-1985 and was produced by Martin Hannett, collecting the band's early songs. The album was not released at the time because the band were unhappy with the production and songs. Their self-titled album was the band's proper debut four years later.

The Garage Flower album was finally released in November 1996 by Garage Flower Records.

The album contains previously unavailable early songs, and early versions of "I Wanna Be Adored" and "This Is the One". The album's title is taken from the lyric in "Tell Me", "I am the garage flower".

== Track listing ==
All tracks are written by Ian Brown, John Squire (misspelled in the album's liner notes as "Squires") and Andy Couzens except where noted.

No.	Title	Length
1.	"Getting Plenty"	4:04
2.	"Here It Comes" (Brown, Squire)	2:39
3.	"Trust a Fox"	3:03
4.	"Tradjic Roundabout"	3:12
5.	"All I Want"	3:39
6.	"Heart on the Staves"	3:19
7.	"I Wanna Be Adored" (Brown, Squire)	3:29
8.	"This Is the One" (Brown, Squire)	3:41
9.	"Fall"	2:49
10.	"So Young" (Brown, Squire)	3:18
11.	"Tell Me" (Brown, Squire)	3:52
12.	"Haddock"	0:14
13.	"Just a Little Bit"	3:08
14.	"Mission Impossible"	3:44
Total length:		44:11

== Charts ==
=== Weekly charts ===
Chart (1996)	Peak position
Scottish Albums (Official Charts)	55
UK Albums (Official Charts)	58
UK Physical Albums (OCC)	58

Chart (2001)	Peak position
UK Independent Albums (Official Charts)	25
