= Fools Gold (song) =

Single by the Stone Roses
- A-side: "What the World Is Waiting For" (double A-side)
- Released: 13 November 1989
- Recorded: Mid and late 1989
- Studio: Sawmills (Fowey); Battery (London)
- Genre: Madchester; dance-rock; funk rock; breakbeat; psychedelic funk
- Length: 9:53 (12-inch version); 4:15 (7-inch version)
- Label: Silvertone
- Songwriters: Ian Brown; John Squire
- Producer: John Leckie

The Stone Roses singles chronology
"She Bangs the Drums" (1989)	"Fools Gold" / "What the World Is Waiting For" (1989)	"I Wanna Be Adored" (1989)

"Fools Gold" is a song by British rock band the Stone Roses. It was released as a double A-side single with "What the World Is Waiting For" on 13 November 1989 through Silvertone Records. "Fools Gold" would go on to appear on certain non-UK versions of their self-titled debut studio album (1989). It became the band's first single to reach the top ten of the UK Singles Chart and stayed in the top-75 for fourteen weeks, peaking at number eight.

== Recording and composition ==
"Fools Gold" and "What the World Is Waiting For" were recorded at Sawmills Studios in Cornwall during mid-1989, with additional vocal and guitar parts recorded later at London's Battery Studios, during late 1989. The tracks had been worked on for four months, and the intention was to put "What the World Is Waiting For" as the A side; however, when Roddy Mckenna, Silvertone's A&R man, heard "Fools Gold" he urged the band to use that as the A-side. The band were not completely convinced, and agreed to release the two tracks as a double A-side instead.

"Fools Gold" has been described as a Madchester, dance-rock, funk rock, breakbeat, and psychedelic funk song. The dance-oriented song showcased the rhythm section of Mani on bass and Reni on percussion. Ian Brown stated the song was written over "The Funky Drummer" by James Brown, which Reni had to learn the beat from. John Squire also plays guitar with various wah-wah pedal effects. Ian Brown sings the vocals in a whispered delivery. He would also perform with this technique for the track "Something's Burning".

The bassline was adapted from Kevin O'Neal's bassline in "Know How" by Young MC, which Mani heard after going clubbing "looking for things to pinch". The lyrics reference Nancy Sinatra's "These Boots Are Made for Walkin'" and Marquis de Sade. According to Brown, the song's verses were inspired by John Huston's 1948 film adaptation of The Treasure of the Sierra Madre and tells about "three geezers who are skint and they put their money together to get equipment to go looking for gold, then they all betray each other..."

== Release ==
The single was released in 1989 and entered the UK top ten. It was promoted with a music video, showing the Stone Roses performing outdoors and walking across the volcanic landscape of Lanzarote, Canary Islands. The cover art was a painting by John Squire, "Double Dorsal Dopplegänger", which was later exhibited at Squire's 2004 art exhibition.

The band's appearance on the same November Top of the Pops as the Happy Mondays, who performed "Hallelujah" from the Madchester Rave On EP, is regarded as a "cultural high-water mark", exposing the emerging Madchester scene to a wider audience, and popularizing a new dance-oriented music genre, baggy.

Although a non-album double A-sided single, both tracks have appeared on the compilation albums Turns into Stone, The Complete Stone Roses and The Very Best of The Stone Roses. Both tracks have also appeared on some reissued editions of their debut album The Stone Roses, although "Fools Gold" has appeared more often than "What the World Is Waiting For".

== Legacy ==
In May 2007, NME magazine placed "Fools Gold" at number 32 in its list of the 50 Greatest Indie Anthems Ever. The same magazine later placed the song at number 31 in their "500 Greatest Songs of All Time" list in 2014.

In 2009, listeners of the Australian radio station Triple J voted "Fools Gold" number 76 in the Triple J Hottest 100 of All Time.

== Track listings ==
1989 UK release

- 7-inch vinyl (Silvertone ORE 13)
1. "Fools Gold 4.15" (4:15)
2. "What the World Is Waiting For" (3:55)
- 12-inch vinyl (Silvertone ORE T 13)
1. "Fools Gold 9.53" (9:53)
2. "What the World Is Waiting For" (3:55)
- Cassette (Silvertone ORE C 13)
  CD (Silvertone ORE CD 13)
1. "Fools Gold 9.53" (9:53)
2. "What the World Is Waiting For" (3:55)
3. "Fools Gold 4.15" (4:15)

1990 US release

- 12-inch gold vinyl (Silvertone 1315-1-JD)
  cassette (Silvertone 1315-4-JS)
  CD (Silvertone 1315-2-JD)
1. "Fools Gold 9.53" (9:53)
2. "What the World Is Waiting For" (3:55)
3. "Fools Gold 4.15" (4:15)

1989 Japanese release

- CD (Silvertone/Alfa 18B2-103)
1. "What the World Is Waiting For" (3:55)
2. "Fools Gold" (4:17)
3. "She Bangs the Drums" (12-inch mix) (3:43)
4. "Elephant Stone" (12-inch mix) (4:51)
5. "Guernica" (4:23)
6. "Going Down" (2:26)

Fools Gold 1992 UK reissue

12-inch vinyl, cassette and CD are the same as 1989 releases

- CD2 (Silvertone ORE CD Z 13)
1. "Fools Gold" (The Top Won Mix!) (10:03)
2. "Fools Gold" (The Bottom Won Mix!) (7:00)
- Both remixes by A Guy Called Gerald

Fools Gold '95

- 12-inch vinyl (Silvertone ORE T 71)
1. "Fools Gold" (The Tall Paul Remix) (7:21)
2. "Fools Gold" 9.53 (9:53)
3. "Fools Gold" (Cricklewood Ballroom Mix) (4:16)
- Cassette (Silvertone ORE C 71)
1. "Fools Gold" 4.15 (4:15)
2. "Fools Gold" (The Tall Paul Remix) (7:21)
- CD (Silvertone ORE CD 71)
1. "Fools Gold" 4.15 (4:15)
2. "Fools Gold" 9.53 (9:53)
3. "Fools Gold" (The Tall Paul Remix) (7:21)
4. "Fools Gold" (Cricklewood Ballroom Mix) (4:16)

Fools Gold (1999 remix) UK release

- 12-inch vinyl (Jive Electro 0523090)
1. "Fools Gold" (Grooverider's Mix) (6:36)
2. "She Bangs the Drums" (Kiss My Arse Mix) (4:02)
3. "Fools Gold" (Rabbit in the Moon's Message to the Majors) (8:24)
- Cassette (Jive Electro 0523094)
1. "Fools Gold" (Grooverider's Mix – Edit) (4:30)
2. "She Bangs the Drums" (Kiss My Arse Mix) (4:02)
- CD (Jive Electro 0523092)
1. "Fools Gold" (Grooverider's Mix – Edit) (4:30)
2. "Fools Gold" (Rabbit in the Moon's Message to the Majors) (8:24)
3. "She Bangs the Drums" (Kiss My Arse Mix) (4:02)

Fools Gold (1999 remix) German release

- CD (Jive Electro 0523362)
1. "Fools Gold" (Rabbit in the Moon's Message to the Majors – Edit) (4:43)
2. "Fools Gold" (Grooverider's Mix – Edit) (4:30)
3. "Fools Gold" (Rabbit in the Moon's Message to the Majors) (8:24)
4. "She Bangs the Drums" (Kiss My Arse Mix) (4:02)

Fools Gold (1999 remix) US release

- 12-inch vinyl (Jive Electro 01241-42579-1)
1. "Fools Gold" (Grooverider's Mix) (6:37)
2. "Fools Gold" (Rabbit in the Moon's Straight Beat Pyrite Dub) (7:35)
3. "Fools Gold" (Rabbit in the Moon's Message to the Majors – Extended) (9:42)

Fools Gold (UK 2009 remaster)

- 7-inch vinyl (Silvertone 88697535907)
  CD (Silvertone 886975631124)
1. "Fools Gold" (4:15)
2. "What the World Is Waiting For" (3:55)

== Charts ==
=== Weekly charts ===
Weekly chart performance for "Fools Gold" / "What the World Is Waiting For"
Chart (1989–1990)	Peak position
Australia (ARIA)	13
Belgium (Ultratop 50 Flanders)	27
Finland (Suomen virallinen lista)	17
Ireland (IRMA)	9
Luxembourg (Radio Luxembourg)	15
Netherlands (Dutch Top 40)	8
Netherlands (Single Top 100)	10
New Zealand (Recorded Music NZ)	24
UK Singles (OCC)	8
US Alternative Airplay (Billboard)	5
US Dance Club Songs (Billboard)	27

Year	Chart	Peak position
1995	UK Singles (OCC)	25
1999	Australia (ARIA)	87
1999	UK Singles (OCC)	25
2005	UK Singles (OCC)	93
2009	UK Singles (OCC)	95

=== Year-end charts ===
1990 year-end chart performance for "Fools Gold" / "What the World Is Waiting For"
Chart (1990)	Position
Australia (ARIA)	93
Netherlands (Dutch Top 40)	70

== Certifications ==
Certifications for "Fools Gold" / "What the World Is Waiting For"
Region	Certification	Certified units/sales
United Kingdom (BPI)	Platinum	600,000^{‡}
^{‡} Sales+streaming figures based on certification alone.

== Notes and references ==
Notes
