= Mani (musician) =

British bassist (1962–2025)

Gary Mounfield
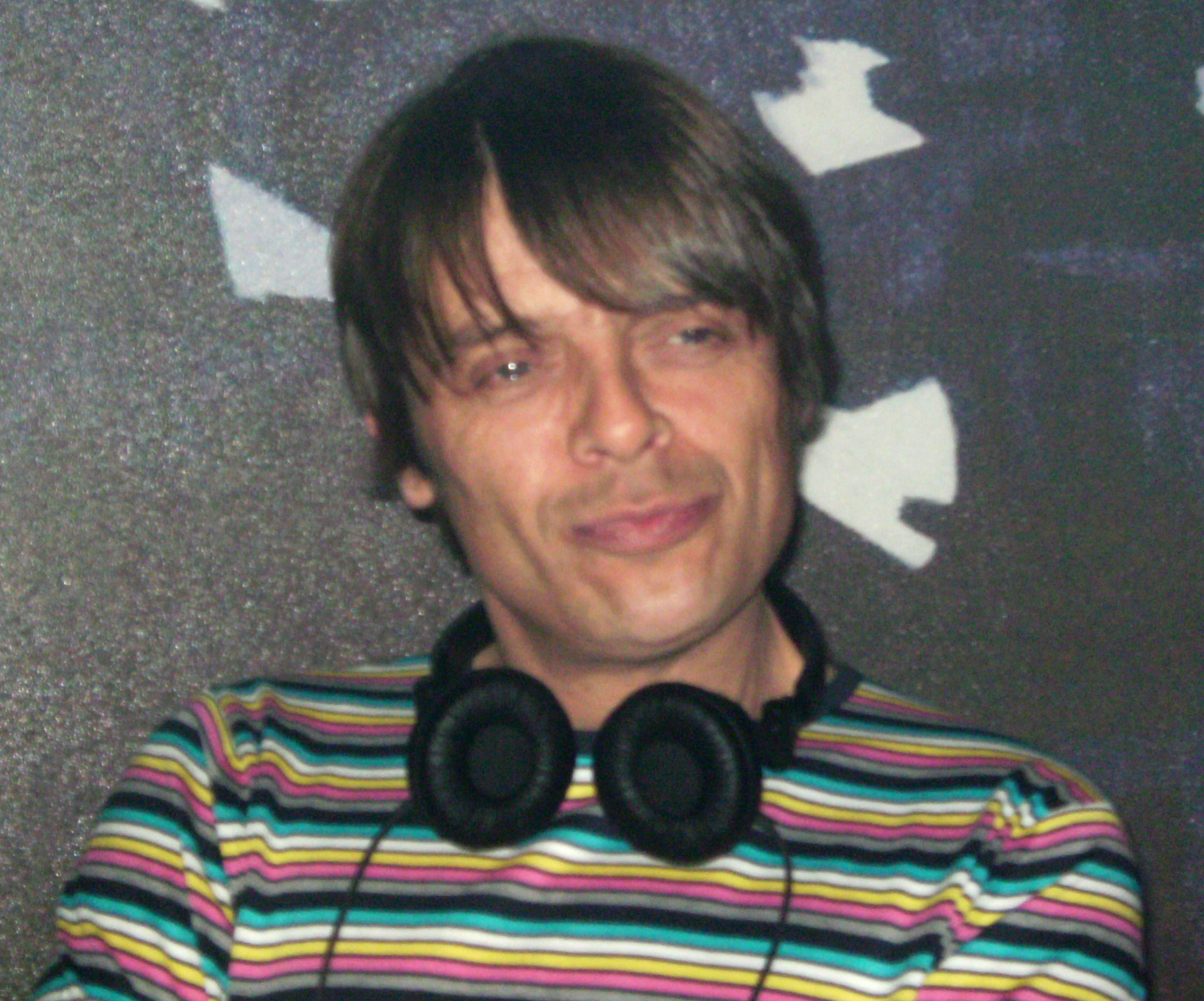
- Mani in 2009

Background information
- Also known as: Mani
- Born: Gary Mounfield; 16 November 1962; Crumpsall, Manchester, England
- Died: 20 November 2025 (aged 63) Heaton Moor, Stockport, England
- Genres: Madchester; indie rock; alternative rock; dance-rock; neo-psychedelia
- Occupations: Musician; DJ
- Instrument: Bass guitar
- Years active: 1987–2025
- Labels: MVB; Silvertone; Geffen; Creation; Sony; B-Unique
- Formerly of: The Stone Roses; Primal Scream; Freebass
- Spouse: Imelda Mounfield (died 2023)

Gary Mounfield (16 November 1962 – 20 November 2025), known professionally as Mani, was an English bassist, best known for being a member of the rock bands the Stone Roses and Primal Scream.

Mani joined the Stone Roses in 1987 and played on both their albums before the group disbanded in 1996. Later that year, he became the full-time bassist for Primal Scream, performing on five consecutive albums from Vanishing Point (1997) to Beautiful Future (2008). He left Primal Scream in 2011 to participate in the Stone Roses' reunion; the Stone Roses broke up for a second time in 2017.

== Early life ==
Gary Mounfield was born on 16 November 1962, in Crumpsall. His father was Colin Mounfield, a chef for the Manchester United football team. His mother was Irish, Anne Patricia Farrell from Athy in County Kildare. He attended Xaverian College in Rusholme, Manchester. He developed an interest in darts, a sport he went on to champion throughout his career.

== Career ==
Mounfield left school aged sixteen in 1979. In 1984–1985, he briefly played with Clint Boon in a band that called themselves The Mill. Along with John Squire, he was in the original line-up on guitar in a band called The Waterfront that didn't perform live but did record two tracks that were eventually released in 2018. He joined the Stone Roses in 1987 which were part of the "Madchester" music scene. Playing on both of the band's studio albums, Mounfield was in the Stone Roses until they disbanded in 1996. Mounfield used a Rickenbacker 4005 Jackson Pollock-influenced paint-splattered bass guitar in the period after the Stone Roses' self-titled debut studio album. He joined Primal Scream after the Stone Roses disbanded. He claimed that Primal Scream were one of three other bands that he would be willing to join; the Jesus and Mary Chain and Oasis being the others. In 2003, with Damon Minchella having left Ocean Colour Scene (OCS), he toured with the band supporting the Stereophonics.

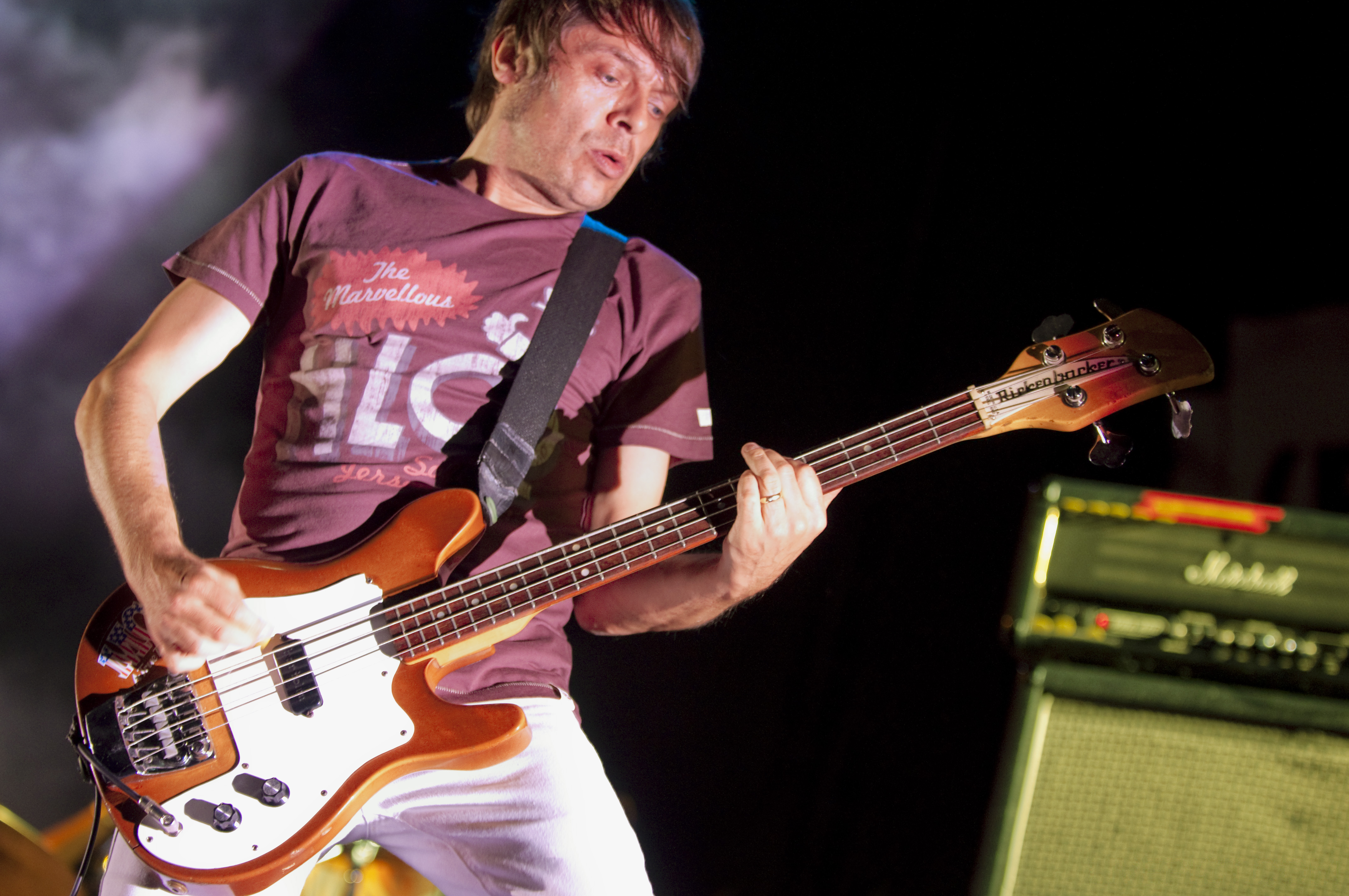
Mounfield performing with Primal Scream in 2009

Mounfield was often viewed as the most amiable member of the Roses, both while the band were still together and after their break-up. After the Stone Roses split up, there had been frequent speculation that they might reform. Mounfield, a lifelong Manchester United fan, joked that the band would reform after "Manchester City won the European Cup". He was also viewed as the most likely member to be up for a Roses reunion. During the band's split, he occasionally joined their lead vocalist Ian Brown on stage for renditions of songs by the Stone Roses ("Waterfall", "Made of Stone", "I Am the Resurrection"), as happened in 2008 at Summercase Festival (in Madrid and Barcelona), when both Primal Scream and Brown were playing on the same day. Mounfield played bass on some demos for ex-Stone Roses drummer Reni and there were further rumours of the group reforming in 2005 when the two were interviewed for the Manchester Music show on BBC GMR whilst attending a gig in Manchester. Mounfield toured with the Enemy on their UK tour.

Mounfield had a guest role in the biographical comedy drama film 24 Hour Party People (2002). He was in a supergroup band called Freebass with bassists Andy Rourke (formerly of the Smiths) and Peter Hook (Joy Division and New Order). Freebass disbanded before releasing their debut studio album It's a Beautiful Life in 2010. He appeared at the "Manchester Versus Cancer" event on 30 March 2007, performing a DJ set and appearing with Ian Brown for the finale, the Stone Roses' "I Am the Resurrection".

Mani left Primal Scream for the Stone Roses 2012 reunion. He continued as a full-time Primal Scream member until his last appearance with them at Edinburgh's Hogmanay on 31 December 2011.

== Personal life ==
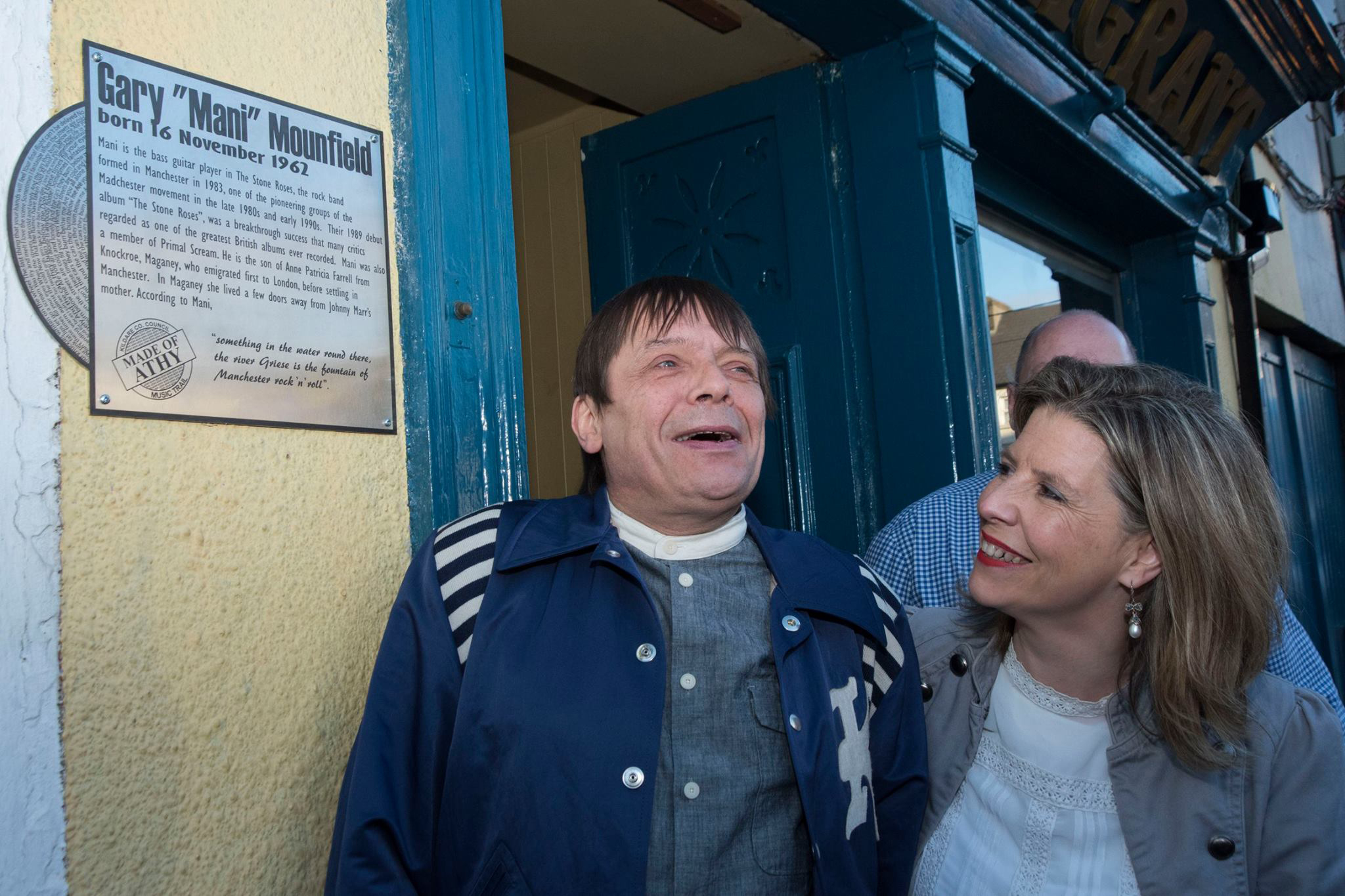
Mani accepts his Made of Athy Award in 2019

Mani met his first wife, Sophie Bevan during the 13 months of recording sessions for the Stone Roses' 1994 album, Second Coming, at Rockfield Studios in Monmouth, Wales. In August of 1995, Mani’s eldest child Joseph Mounfield was born. Mani later remarried Imelda and they were married until her death from bowel cancer in November 2023. The couple had twin sons, Gene and George Mounfield.

Mounfield was a supporter of Manchester United and appeared on Sky One's programme Football Years. He also revealed on Play UK programme Nu Music that although he supported Manchester United in England, he was Mancunian Irish and was brought up to support Ireland. In 2019, Mani accepted the Made of Athy Award from his mother's hometown in Athy, County Kildare.

Mounfield had lived in Heaton Moor, Stockport, since 1991, up until his death.

== Death and funeral ==
Mounfield died on 20 November 2025, aged 63, at his home in his sleep due to respiratory issues caused by long-standing emphysema. His death was announced later that day by his brother. Mounfield's funeral was held at Manchester Cathedral on 22 December. His coffin was decorated with the artwork from the Stone Roses' debut album, and it was carried into the cathedral by his eldest son Joseph, his nephew Jonny, brother-in-law Michael and other close friends, later carried out by Squire, Reni and Brown of the band; Bobby Gillespie and Andrew Innes of Primal Scream; and Liam Gallagher of Oasis.

== Awards ==
Year	Award
2007	NME Awards – Godlike Genius Award (as part of Primal Scream)
