= So Young (The Stone Roses song) =

"So Young/Tell Me"

Single by the Stone Roses
- Released: September 1985 (UK)
- Recorded: March 1985
- Genre: Post-punk
- Length: 3:30 (So Young); 3:50 (Tell Me)
- Producer: Martin Hannett

The Stone Roses singles chronology
"So Young/Tell Me" (1985)	"Sally Cinnamon" (1987)

"So Young/Tell Me" is the debut double A-side single by English rock band the Stone Roses, produced by Martin Hannett and released in 1985 on Thin Line. The single went without much notice outside of Manchester, and demonstrates a very different aggressive punk/new wave style than the band's later material with Reni in particular showcasing a more exuberant drumming style.

== Background ==
"So Young" was originally titled "Misery Dictionary", but the band changed the song's title to make it sound less negative and because they did not want people to think that they were influenced by the Smiths who had similarly titled songs, such as "Miserable Lie" and "Heaven Knows I'm Miserable Now".

== Recording ==
Recorded at Strawberry Studios, the double A-side 12-inch vinyl single was the producer Martin Hannett's first release with tape operator David Wood on Hannett's newly created Thinline Records under the catalogue number THIN001.

== Artwork ==
The front cover artwork was produced by John Squire, who smashed an old transistor radio and then glued the parts together.

== Release and reception ==
The lead singer Ian Brown has since distanced himself from the songs, saying he "wouldn't pay 10p for it now" and that it sounded like "four lads trying to get out of Manchester".

The single later appeared as part of the Compact Disc Singles Collection, an 8-CD collection of the band's singles released by Silvertone in 1992. Both songs also featured on the compilation albums The Complete Stone Roses (1995) and Garage Flower (1996).

== Track listings ==
=== 1985 release ===
with "So Young/Tell Me" on the cover

12-inch vinyl (Thin Line THIN 001)

1. "So Young" (3:30)
2. "Tell Me" (3:50)

=== 1992 issue ===
with just "So Young" on the cover

CD (Silvertone ORE CD 37)

only available as part of a box set

1. "So Young" (3:30)
2. "Tell Me" (3:50)
