= One Love (The Stone Roses song) =

Single by the Stone Roses
- B-side: "Something's Burning"
- Released: 2 July 1990
- Genre: Baggy; Madchester
- Length: 7:45 (12" version); 3:35 (7" version)
- Label: Silvertone
- Songwriter(s): Ian Brown; John Squire
- Producer(s): John Leckie

The Stone Roses singles chronology
"I Wanna Be Adored" (1989)	"One Love" (1990)	"Waterfall" (1991)

"One Love" is a non-album single by English rock band the Stone Roses. The single was released in July 1990, peaking at number four in the Roses' home country of the UK, becoming their highest-charting single at the time. "One Love" has appeared on the compilation albums Turns into Stone, The Complete Stone Roses and The Very Best of The Stone Roses.

== Track listings ==
UK 7-inch vinyl

1. "One Love" – 3:35
2. "Something's Burning" – 7:50

UK 12-inch vinyl, cassette, and CD

1. "One Love" – 7:45
2. "Something's Burning" – 7:50

US 12-inch vinyl, cassette, and CD digipak

1. "One Love" – 7:45
2. "Something's Burning" – 7:50
3. "One Love" (7-inch version) – 3:35

Japanese CD

1. "One Love" – 3:35
2. "One Love" (12-inch version) – 7:45
3. "Something's Burning" – 7:50

(Track 3 incorrectly listed as "Something' Burning")

== Charts ==
Weekly chart performance for "One Love"
Chart (1990)	Peak position
Australia (ARIA)	79
Europe (Eurochart Hot 100)	12
Finland (Suomen virallinen lista)	17
Netherlands (Single Top 100)	65
New Zealand (Recorded Music NZ)	28
UK Singles (OCC)	4
US Alternative Airplay (Billboard)	9
