= Baggy =

British dance-oriented music genre

- Stylistic origins: Madchester; indie-dance; neo-psychedelia; acid house; dance-rock; breakbeat; psychedelic funk; funk rock
- Cultural origins: Late 1980s – 1990s, Manchester, England
- Derivative forms: Britpop

Local scenes
- Madchester

Baggy is a British alternative dance genre popular in the late 1980s and early 1990s, and generally associated with the Northern UK's Madchester scene. The style saw alternative rock bands draw influence from psychedelia as well as dance music.

== History ==
The genesis of indie-dance was the Balearic beat scene (where there were DJs playing an eclectic mix of records including such rock/dance crossovers like "Jesus on the Payroll" by Thrashing Doves and producers like Paul Oakenfold) and the indie music scene in the north west of England, which featured Tony Wilson's Factory Records and former post-punk band the Stone Roses in Manchester.

Even though the Stone Roses were not signed to Factory Records, instead signing to Paul Birch's Revolver Records in Wolverhampton (before taking a deal with Jive Records' Silvertone), the band did have links to Tony Wilson, Martin Hannett and Peter Hook, with the New Order bassist scheduled to produce their debut album before John Leckie took over.

It was Leckie who produced the Stone Roses single "Fools Gold" (an indie-dance record which had a prominent 'shufflebeat' which came from a four-bar loop based upon Clyde Stubblefield's "Funky Drummer" drum pattern, as well as Bobby Bird's "Hot Pants" beat) and it was mainly fans of the Stone Roses who started to wear the fashions that gave the genre/scene its alternative name.

== Madchester and scally ==
Although it was not geographically confined to the city of Manchester, many Madchester bands like Happy Mondays, Northside and the Stone Roses were described as being baggy. As baggy was characterised by psychedelia and acid house-influenced guitar music, often with a "Funky Drummer" beat, new indie-dance bands in other British cities emerged following the breakthrough of the Madchester acts, though some acts in Liverpool argued they were already part of their own scene which had emerged independently of those in Manchester (sometimes referred to as 'scally').

Some acts, such as Candy Flip, Blur and the Soup Dragons reinvented their sound and image to fit in with the new scene. This led some critics to accuse baggy bands of bandwagon-jumping and derivative songwriting.

Bands in the indie-dance era of pop music can be divided into two camps; the acts who could be described as baggy (usually the Madchester acts and a few others such as Flowered Up from London), and those who can be described as alternative dance (i.e. Jesus Jones and the Shamen, who were more techno inspired). The Shamen would begin as a psychedelic indie rock band, sharing some of the characteristics of early shoegaze bands, but their style would morph between psychedelic indie rock and acid house, before absorbing more elements of techno to become a dance music act, in a way similar to the Beloved, whose career took them from an indie band to a dance duo after the Second Summer of Love.

== Clothing ==
Alongside the music, a way of dressing emerged that gave baggy its unique name. Baggy jeans (often flared) alongside brightly coloured or tie-dye casual tops and general 1960s style became fashionable first in Manchester and then across the country – frequently topped off with a bucket hat in the style sported by the Stone Roses' drummer Reni. The overall look was part rave, part retro or part hippie, part football casual. Many Madchester bands had football casual fans and a number of bands even wore football shirts. Eaitisham 'Shami' Ahmed's Manchester-based Joe Bloggs fashion label specialised in catering for the scene, making him a multi-millionaire.

It is also generally accepted that French stylists Marithé et François Girbaud were among the first designers to integrate baggy in the fashion industry, though the style can be seen originating in the Northern soul scene. This scene included Twisted Wheel attendee Phil Saxe, who went on to sell flares and baggy clothing on his Gangway market stall in Manchester and Joe Moss who ran Crazyface.

== Legacy ==
Some baggy bands evolved into indie rock or Britpop bands who remained popular throughout the 1990s. The Charlatans retained their popularity, although little trace of the baggy sound and look remained. The baggy style was eclipsed by the grunge and Britpop genres; apart from tribute acts, the style has been absent from the indie arena.

There was another wave of bands in the style of the past baggy Madchester sound during the mid-2010s. Bands such as Kasabian, Reverend and the Makers, the Ruling Class, Sulk, the Bavarian Druglords, and Working for a Nuclear Free City brought back aspects of the style in various forms and have garnered comparisons to the Stone Roses and the Madchester sound.
