= She Bangs the Drums =

Single by the Stone Roses

from the album The Stone Roses
- B-side: "Mersey Paradise": "Standing Here"; "Simone"
- Released: 17 July 1989
- Genre: Madchester; indie rock; psychedelic rock; jangle pop
- Length: 3:43
- Label: Silvertone
- Songwriters: Ian Brown; John Squire
- Producer: John Leckie

The Stone Roses singles chronology
"Made of Stone" (1989)	"She Bangs the Drums" (1989)	"Fools Gold/What The World Is Waiting For" (1989)

"She Bangs the Drums" is a song by English rock band the Stone Roses. The song was released as the second single from their eponymous debut album (1989). It was released in the UK, Japan, and Germany. The single was their first Top 40 hit, peaking at number 36 on the UK Singles Chart in July 1989. A reissue in March 1990 improved by two places.

The single used a noticeably different mix of "She Bangs the Drums" from the album version. The album version's hi-hat intro was omitted and it featured a slightly heavier guitar sound and a marginally different backing vocal arrangement. This single version is the one most commonly used for compilations and radio play. The CD and cassette singles were noted for their strong selection of B-sides: "Standing Here", "Mersey Paradise", and the backward playing track "Simone". The song was written by Ian Brown and John Squire, with Brown writing the verse lyrics, while Squire was responsible for the chorus, although an early acoustic demo features an unused chorus written by Brown.

In May 2007, NME magazine placed "She Bangs the Drums" at number 12 in its list of the "50 Greatest Indie Anthems Ever". The track was also featured as number 26 on PopMatters' "The 100 Greatest Alternative Singles of the '80s" list. The song is featured in the 2007 music rhythm game Guitar Hero III as a bonus song, though not as a master recording.

Two music videos were produced for "She Bangs the Drums". The first video showed the band recording in a studio in January 1989. The band is shown goofing around in slow motion, with Squire's artwork in the background. The second music video featured clips from the Roses' classic gig at Blackpool Empress Ballroom on 12 August 1989. This second video is more often played now than the original on television.

== Track listings ==
7-inch vinyl (Silvertone ORE 6)

1. "She Bangs the Drums" – 3:43
2. "Standing Here" – 5:05

12-inch vinyl (Silvertone ORE T 6)

1. "She Bangs the Drums" – 3:43
2. "Mersey Paradise" – 2:44
3. "Standing Here" – 5:05

Cassette (Silvertone ORE C 6), CD (Silvertone ORE CD 6)

1. "She Bangs the Drums" – 3:43
2. "Mersey Paradise" – 2:44
3. "Standing Here" – 5:05
4. "Simone" – 4:24

== Charts ==
1989–1990 chart performance for "She Bangs the Drums"
Chart (1989–1990)	Peak position
UK Singles (OCC)	34
US Alternative Airplay (Billboard)	9

2025 chart performance for "She Bangs the Drums"
Chart (2025)	Peak position
UK Dance (OCC)	21

== Certifications ==
Region	Certification	Certified units/sales
United Kingdom (BPI)	Platinum	600,000^{‡}
^{‡} Sales+streaming figures based on certification alone.
