= The Stone Roses (album) =

Studio album by the Stone Roses
- Released: 2 May 1989
- Recorded: June 1988 – February 1989
- Studios: Battery, London; Konk, London; Rockfield, Monmouthshire
- Genres: Madchester; neo-psychedelia; indie rock; alternative rock
- Length: 48:20
- Label: Silvertone
- Producers: John Leckie; Peter Hook ("Elephant Stone")

The Stone Roses chronology
The Stone Roses (1989)	Turns into Stone (1992)

Singles from The Stone Roses
- 1. "Elephant Stone" Released: October 1988; 2. "Made of Stone" Released: 6 March 1989; 3. "She Bangs the Drums" Released: 17 July 1989; 4. "Fools Gold" / "What the World Is Waiting For" Released: 13 November 1989; 5. "I Wanna Be Adored" Released: 1989 (US); 6. "Waterfall" Released: 30 December 1991; 7. "I Am the Resurrection" Released: 30 March 1992

The Stone Roses is the debut studio album by the English rock band the Stone Roses, released on 2 May 1989 by Silvertone Records. It was recorded mostly at Battery Studios in London with producer John Leckie from June 1988 to February 1989.

Despite not being an immediate success, The Stone Roses has now sold over four million copies worldwide. The album grew popular alongside the band's high-profile concert performances, which also helped establish them as fixtures of the Madchester and baggy cultural scenes. Its critical standing also improved significantly in later years, with it now considered to be one of the greatest albums of all time. It was voted number 11 in the third edition of Colin Larkin's All Time Top 1000 Albums (2000), and in 2020, Rolling Stone ranked it at number 319 on its updated list of the "500 Greatest Albums of All Time".

== Background ==
Based in Manchester, where the so-called Madchester musical movement was centred, the Stone Roses formed in 1983. Between their formation and the release of their debut album, the band had gone through different names and line-ups, trying out different sounds, and released several singles on several different labels.

Bassist Mani was a fan of producer John Leckie's work with the Dukes of Stratosphear and suggested the band work with him. Leckie found the band's demos for the album to be poor, noting that the tempos were too fast and there was too much reverb on the vocals.

The recording took place primarily at Battery Studios in London, with additional sessions at Konk, Coconut Grove Studios in Stockport, and Rockfield Studios in Wales. Leckie said that the band were "very well rehearsed" and that they "didn't seem to feel any pressure other than that they were a band making their first album and didn't want to lose the opportunity to make it good. So there wasn't any pressure to prove themselves – they knew they were good." However, in a 2024 interview, Leckie commented that the band and the material were still rough when recording began, and that "I had to rehearse them and rearrange songs, giving them intros and outros, and steady tempos."

Guitarist John Squire primarily used a Fender Stratocaster plugged into a Fender Twin Reverb amplifier and he occasionally employed Ibanez overdrive and chorus pedals. Mani played a Rickenbacker bass through an Ampeg SVT bass amp.

"I Am the Resurrection" was originally supposed to end with a loud, feedback-drenched coda akin to how the band performed it live, but Leckie advised them that it would sound "boring" on the album and that they should instead "do something melodic that people will remember."

Squire and singer Ian Brown were unhappy with the finished mix, wanting the bass and drums to be louder and the guitars to sound "more devastating". Leckie attributes this to the fact that Brown and Squire were listening to Public Enemy on "full blast" in the studio.

== Music and lyrics ==
According to writers Sean Sennett and Simon Groth, the Stone Roses "virtually invented 'Madchester' and built a template for Brit-pop" with their debut album. The record has been associated with rave culture and dance music, although Angus Batey from The Quietus argued that it was a 1960s-inspired jangle pop album featuring little or no influence of dance beats or grooves, with the exception of "Fools Gold". According to AllMusic's Stephen Thomas Erlewine, the rhythm section of bassist Mani and drummer Reni played in a manner that was merely suggestive of dance rhythms, while Ian Brown dispassionately sang lyrics expressing arrogant sentiments such as "I Wanna Be Adored" and "I Am the Resurrection". In the opinion of Spin critic Andrew Unterberger, it sounded more like "an exercise in rock classicism", featuring accessible melodies like those of the Beatles and resonant guitars similar to the Byrds, along with "the cheeky (and quintessentially British) humor of the Smiths" and "the self-fulfilling arrogance of the Sex Pistols". The melody for the song "Elizabeth My Dear" was appropriated from the English traditional ballad "Scarborough Fair".

== Artwork ==
As with most Stone Roses releases, the cover displays a work by the band's guitarist John Squire, in this case a Jackson Pollock-influenced piece titled "Bye Bye Badman", which makes reference to the May 1968 riots in Paris. The cover was named by Q magazine as one of "The 100 Best Record Covers of All Time." In the accompanying article, Squire said: "Ian [Brown] had met this French man when he was hitching around Europe, this bloke had been in the riots, and he told Ian how lemons had been used as an antidote to tear gas. Then there was the documentary—a great shot at the start of a guy throwing stones at the police. I really liked his attitude." The story was also the inspiration for the lyrics to the song of the same name. The background of the piece is based on the Giant's Causeway in Northern Ireland; the band had visited the causeway while playing a gig at the University of Ulster in Coleraine. After his death in 2025, Mani's coffin was decorated with the artwork.

== Release and promotion ==
The Stone Roses was released on 2 May 1989 by Silvertone, a division of Zomba Records created to work with "new rock" acts. While by this time the Madchester scene had already attracted some coverage from music publications, The Stone Roses originally received little attention from both consumers and critics in the United Kingdom. Bob Stanley from Melody Maker called it "godlike" and said the foundation of the music was John Squire's guitar playing, which he deemed "beautifully flowing, certainly psychedelic, there are elements of Hendrix (especially on 'Shoot You Down') and Marr (check the fade to 'Bye Bye Badman'), but the rest is the lad's own work". In Q, Peter Kane was less favourable and felt that The Stone Roses was a promising album weighed down by "strangely monotone production", while NME journalist Jack Barron wrote that it was merely "quite good" while giving it a score of seven on a scale of 10; the latter magazine later ranked it as the second best record of 1989 in their year-end list. In The Village Voice, US critic Robert Christgau wrote that the group was "overhyped" and no different from the numerous American indie bands, asking "what do they do that the Byrds and the Buffalo Springfield weren't doing better in 1967?" He concluded that "they're surprisingly 'eclectic.' Not all that good at it, but eclectic," despite some moments of good songwriting ("Bye Bye Badman", "I Wanna Be Adored").

To support the album, the band played several high-profile gigs, including one on 27 February 1989, at what was regarded as the centre of the associated Madchester and baggy scenes, Manchester's The Haçienda nightclub. Andrew Collins wrote in NME: "Bollocks to Morrissey at Wolverhampton, to The Sundays at The Falcon, to PWEI at Brixton – I'm already drafting a letter to my grandchildren telling them that I saw The Stone Roses at the Haçienda." The band's debut appearance on Top of the Pops in November 1989 helped the album receive more mainstream exposure. The album eventually brought them nationwide success and soon the band, along with fellow Madchester group Happy Mondays, were perceived as one of the key acts of the baggy scene. Their May 1990 Spike Island gig, organised by the band and attended by over 27,000 fans, also holds a formidable reputation. Critics have frequently labelled it the "Woodstock of the baggy generation". The Stone Roses has sold over four million copies worldwide, according to the 2006 book covering the album for the 33⅓ music series.

== Legacy and reappraisal ==
Retrospective professional ratings
Review scores
Source	Rating
AllMusic	5/5 stars
The Daily Telegraph	5/5 stars
Mojo	5/5 stars
NME	10/10
Pitchfork	10/10
Q	5/5 stars
Rolling Stone	4/5 stars
Spin	10/10
Spin Alternative Record Guide	9/10
Uncut	5/5 stars

The Stone Roses was acclaimed by critics and musicians in subsequent years, being viewed as an even more important album than when it was first released, as reflected by its high ranking in polls of the greatest albums of all time. Reassessing it for NME upon its 1991 re-release, Mary Anne Hobbs deemed The Stone Roses "the most fluent crossover album of the last decade", and on its cultural impact, wrote: "Indie-dance was activated, its underground sister the rave scene outed, and Britain went Baggy." Rolling Stone's David Fricke later called it "a blast of magnificent arrogance, a fusion of Sixties-pop sparkle and the blown-mind drive of U.K. rave culture", while BBC Music's Chris Jones said it served as a peerless testament to the fusion of rock and dance music inspired by "working class hedonism" at the end of the 1980s.

Mojo reviewer Pat Gilbert strongly recommended its 1999 reissue to listeners and stated that the album "set the tone for rock music in the '90s", while in Q, Ian Gittins wrote that with the album's "mercurial, timeless anthems", the band became "spokesmen for their generation". Bernadette McNulty of The Daily Telegraph believed the 2009 reissue polished the band's bold mix of discordant psychedelic sounds and clever dance beats, but that its legacy as a fabled debut album was enhanced more by the darker, masculine music that followed in Manchester during the 1990s. Zeth Lundy of The Boston Phoenix said it "has been deified by such dubious tastemakers as the NME and Oasis's Noel Gallagher — and the rest of us really like it too". PopMatters critic Jennifer Makowsky argued that "the psychedelic, drug-powered pop songs on the album earned the band a well-earned place in alternative music history."

Some have questioned the critical acclaim that the album has received. American music journalist Jim DeRogatis felt The Stone Roses had been highly overrated by critics, pointing to a "lame retread disco beat" and "oh-so-dated chiming guitars", while Neil Kulkarni from The Quietus said its first three songs were enjoyable but preceded a "right barrel-load of shite afterwards". In an article on overhyped records for The Guardian, Peter Robinson said that The Stone Roses was "an average rock album – lyrically pedestrian and with a sonic policy swerving from the play-safe to the over-indulgent". Fiona Sturges of The Independent found Brown's singing and the band's lyrics to be remarkably poor, and objected to the editors of NME voting The Stone Roses the best British album of all time. After the record was voted the second-best ever in a UK public poll, Channel 4 broadcast a presentation of the results in which three of the presenters—musician Bob Geldof, critic Paul Gambaccini, and artist Justine Frischmann—were critical of the album's inclusion in the top 100 and attributed it to the generation of listeners who voted rather than the record's quality.

=== Accolades ===
In 1997, The Stone Roses was named the second greatest album of all time in a "Music of the Millennium" poll conducted by HMV, Channel 4, The Guardian and Classic FM. In 1998, Q magazine readers placed it at number 4, while in 2000 the same magazine placed it at number 29 in its list of the "100 Greatest British Albums Ever." In 2004, the album was voted the best British album of all time in The Observer's poll of 100 musicians and critics. In 2006, Q placed the album at number 5 in its list of "40 Best Albums of the '80s". In 2008, it was named the fifth "greatest British album ever" by a Q magazine/HMV poll.

In 2000, it received the "greatest album ever" award at the NME Premier Awards show, and in 2006, the album topped the magazine's "100 Greatest British Albums Ever" list. In 2005, Spin magazine ranked it 78 on its list of the "100 greatest albums of the past twenty years." In the same year, when revising their list of the "500 Greatest Albums of All Time" for book format, Rolling Stone included it as one of eight new entries, placing it at number 497; in the 2012 revised list, they placed the album at number 498, saying that the album "single-handedly launched Nineties Brit pop", and in the 2020 update of the list the album's rank climbed to number 319. In 2006, Time named it one of "The All-TIME 100 Albums". In 2003, Pitchfork named it the 39th best album of the 1980s. In 2012, Slant Magazine listed the album at number 28 on its list of "Best Albums of the 1980s". The album was also included in the book 1001 Albums You Must Hear Before You Die. It was voted number 11 in the third edition of Colin Larkin's All Time Top 1000 Albums (2000).

In 2006, British Hit Singles & Albums and NME organised a poll of which, 40,000 people worldwide voted for the 100 best albums ever and The Stone Roses was placed at number seven on the list. In 2010, The Stone Roses won the Mojo Classic Album award. Upon announcing the award, Mojo noted how the band "managed to sum up an era and to create a piece of work that also transcends the time in which it was made." In 2013 The Flaming Lips and friends honoured the record with The Time Has Come to Shoot You Down… What a Sound, a reworking of the entire album. In 2014, the staff of PopMatters included the album on their list of "12 Essential Alternative Rock Albums from the 1980s". In 2013, the album ranked number 7 on NME's The 500 Greatest Albums of All Time.

In 2020, it came third in the BBC Radio 2 "Ultimate 80's Album" poll, beating albums such as "Thriller" by Michael Jackson, "Appetite for Destruction" by Guns N' Roses and "Purple Rain" by Prince. The listeners poll, which had "tens of thousands of votes", had a list of 50 albums to choose from that were selected by a panel of music experts. The shortlist was based on sales from each year of the decade, alongside a selection of albums that have endured the test of time. In 2025, Radio X included the album in its list of "The 25 best indie debut albums of the 1980s".

== Re-releases ==
The Stone Roses – The Collectors Edition box set

In 1999, on the 10th anniversary of its release, a two-disc special edition re-release of The Stone Roses reached number nine on the UK Albums Chart. In 2007, a remastered version was released by Silvertone as a Carbon Neutral Entertainment CD (with tips about Energy Saving). In 2009, the remastered 20th anniversary edition was released in several formats: the standard 11-track album (with the bonus track "Fools Gold") on CD and 12" vinyl LP (the LP version includes a bonus one-sided 7" single featuring the unreleased demo track "Pearl Bastard"); a deluxe edition 2CD/1DVD set, featuring the album on disc one, a 15-track collection of unreleased demos titled The Lost Demos on disc two, and a DVD featuring a 1989 live performance titled Live in Blackpool; and a 3CD/3LP/1DVD collector's edition box set, which features:

- The remastered 11-track album on one CD and one LP
- The Lost Demos on one CD
- The B-sides on one CD
- Two LPs
- Live in Blackpool DVD
- A 48-page booklet, containing unpublished photos and new interviews
- Six 12"-sized art prints featuring John Squire's original single artwork
- A lemon-shaped USB stick, featuring digital files of:
  - The album, the demos, and the B-sides
  - Five previously unreleased "backwards tracks"
  - Six music videos
  - Up at Sawmills: The Making of Fools Gold documentary video
  - Exclusive desktop wallpapers, ringtones, and a 48-page digital booklet

== Track listing ==
All tracks are written by Ian Brown and John Squire.

1989 original release (UK and all markets outside of US)
No.	Title	Length
1.	"I Wanna Be Adored"	4:52
2.	"She Bangs the Drums"	3:43
3.	"Waterfall"	4:37
4.	"Don't Stop"	5:17
5.	"Bye Bye Badman"	4:04
6.	"Elizabeth My Dear"	0:53
7.	"(Song for My) Sugar Spun Sister"	3:25
8.	"Made of Stone"	4:10
9.	"Shoot You Down"	4:10
10.	"This Is the One"	4:58
11.	"I Am the Resurrection"	8:12

All tracks are written by Ian Brown and John Squire.

1989 US release
No.	Title	Length
1.	"I Wanna Be Adored"	4:52
2.	"She Bangs the Drums"	3:43
3.	"Elephant Stone"	3:00
4.	"Waterfall"	4:37
5.	"Don't Stop"	5:17
6.	"Bye Bye Badman"	4:04
7.	"Elizabeth My Dear"	0:53
8.	"(Song for My) Sugar Spun Sister"	3:25
9.	"Made of Stone"	4:10
10.	"Shoot You Down"	4:10
11.	"This Is the One"	4:58
12.	"I Am the Resurrection"	8:12
13.	"Fools Gold"	9:53

Note: The song "Elephant Stone" had been previously released as a single in October 1988 in the UK only, but was added to the US pressings of the album. The album was reissued later in 1989 with "Fools Gold" added.

== Personnel ==
Credits are adapted from the album's liner notes.

The Stone Roses

- Ian Brown – vocals
- Mani – bass guitar
- Reni – drums, backing vocals, piano on "She Bangs the Drums"
- John Squire – guitars, backing vocals on "She Bangs the Drums"

Production

- Peter Hook – production on "Elephant Stone"
- John Leckie – production, mixing engineering on "Elephant Stone"
- Paul Schroeder – engineering
- John Squire – artwork

== Charts ==
Chart (1989–90)	Peak position
Australian Albums (ARIA)	36
Dutch Albums (Album Top 100)	44
New Zealand Albums (RMNZ)	11
Norwegian Albums (VG-lista)	12
Swedish Albums (Sverigetopplistan)	30
UK Albums (Official Charts)	19
US Billboard 200	86

Chart (2004)	Peak position
UK Albums (Official Charts)	9

Chart (2009)	Peak position
UK Albums (Official Charts)	5

== Certifications ==
Region	Certification	Certified units/sales
United Kingdom (BPI)	5× Platinum	1,500,000^{‡}
^{‡} Sales+streaming figures based on certification alone.
