= Elephant Stone =

Single by the Stone Roses
- B-side: "Full Fathom Five": "The Hardest Thing in the World"
- Released: October 1988
- Recorded: January 1988
- Genre: Neo-psychedelia; pop rock
- Length: 3:00 (7" version); 4:51 (12" version)
- Label: Silvertone
- Songwriters: Ian Brown; John Squire
- Producers: Peter Hook; John Leckie

The Stone Roses singles chronology
"Sally Cinnamon" (1987)	"Elephant Stone" (1988)	"Made of Stone" (1989)

"Elephant Stone" is a song by the English rock band the Stone Roses. It was the third single released by the group and their first release on Silvertone Records. Originally released in October 1988, it showcases the group's growing confidence and incorporation of dance rhythms. The song was written by singer Ian Brown and guitarist John Squire. It was inserted as an additional track into the tracklisting of U.S. pressings of the band's debut album in 1989.

== Background ==
The single was produced by New Order bassist Peter Hook in his own studio. It was initially scheduled for release on Rough Trade Records and remixed by John Leckie following a deal with Silvertone Records. Numerous demo versions dating back to 1986 exist as bootlegs that can now easily be found online.

"Elephant Stone" was released in two versions: the original ran for nearly five minutes and featured an extended drum intro and more prominent bass-playing, while the later, shorter cut ran for three minutes and included layers of wah-wah guitar. On its original release it failed to make the chart, but it reached No. 8 on re-release in March 1990.

The B-side "Full Fathom Five" (named after a Jackson Pollock painting) is essentially an alternate single mix of "Elephant Stone" played in reverse.

Originally released as a non-album single, the track appeared on the US release of the band's debut album The Stone Roses and also on some post-1989 reissued UK editions of the album. It has also appeared on the compilation albums Turns into Stone, The Complete Stone Roses and The Very Best of The Stone Roses.

== Track listing ==
=== 1988 release ===
7-inch vinyl (Silvertone ORE 1)

catalogue number in black

1. "Elephant Stone" – 3:00
2. "The Hardest Thing in the World" – 2:39

12-inch vinyl (Silvertone ORE T 1)

catalogue number in black

1. "Elephant Stone" – 4:51
2. "Elephant Stone" (7-inch version) – 3:00
3. "Full Fathom Five" (John Leckie mix) – 2:56
4. "The Hardest Thing in the World" – 2:39

=== 1990 reissue ===
7-inch vinyl (Silvertone ORE 1)

catalogue number in red

1. "Elephant Stone" – 3:00
2. "The Hardest Thing in the World" – 2:39

12-inch vinyl (Silvertone ORE T 1)

catalogue number in red

1. "Elephant Stone" – 4:51
2. "Elephant Stone" (7-inch version) – 3:00
3. "Full Fathom Five" (John Leckie mix) – 2:56
4. "The Hardest Thing in the World" – 2:39

Cassette (Silvertone ORE C 1), CD (Silvertone ORE CD 1)

1. "Elephant Stone" – 4:51
2. "Full Fathom Five" (longer version) – 3:20
3. "The Hardest Thing in the World" – 2:39
4. "Elephant Stone" (7-inch version) – 3:00

== Charts ==
Chart (1990)	Peak position
Australia (ARIA)	86
Ireland (IRMA)	4
Italy Airplay (Music & Media)	5
UK Singles (Official Charts)	8
