= Waterfall (The Stone Roses song) =

Single by the Stone Roses

from the album The Stone Roses
- B-side: "One Love"
- Released: 1991
- Recorded: September 1988; February 1989
- Genre: Madchester; indie rock; baggy; neo-psychedelia
- Length: 4:41 (album version); 3:31 (7" version); 5:23 (12" version); 4:37 (album version 2009 remaster)
- Label: Silvertone
- Songwriters: Ian Brown; John Squire
- Producer: John Leckie

The Stone Roses singles chronology
"One Love" (1990)	"Waterfall" (1991)	"I Am the Resurrection" (1992)

Official video
- "Waterfall" (Official Video) on YouTube

"Waterfall" is the ninth single by the English rock band the Stone Roses. The fourth single taken from their debut album, The Stone Roses (1989), it was released in 1991 by Silvertone Records and reached number 27 on the UK Singles Chart.

The song was placed at number 5 in a 2013 poll, by readers of The Guardian, of their favourite songs by the Stone Roses.

== Track listing ==
- 7" vinyl (Silvertone ORE 35)
- Cassette (Silvertone ORE C 35)
1. "Waterfall" – 3:31
2. "One Love" – 3:40
- 12" vinyl (Silvertone ORE T 35)
1. "Waterfall" – 5:23
2. "One Love" – 7:10
- CD (Silvertone ORE CD 35)
1. "Waterfall (7" version)" – 3:31
2. "One Love (7" version)" – 3:40
3. "Waterfall (12" version)" – 5:23
4. "One Love (12" version)" – 7:10

== Charts ==
Chart (1992)	Peak position
UK Singles (OCC)	27
UK Airplay (Music Week)	30

== Certifications ==
Region	Certification	Certified units/sales
United Kingdom (BPI)	Platinum	600,000^{‡}
^{‡} Sales+streaming figures based on certification alone.
