= I Am the Resurrection =

1992 single by the Stone Roses

Single by the Stone Roses

from the album The Stone Roses
- A-side: "I Am the Resurrection" (remix)
- B-side: "I Am the Resurrection" (dub)
- Released: 30 March 1992
- Genre: Madchester
- Length: 8:13
- Label: Silvertone
- Songwriters: Ian Brown, John Squire
- Producer: John Leckie

The Stone Roses singles chronology
"Waterfall" (1991)	"I Am the Resurrection" (1992)	"Love Spreads" (1994)

"I Am the Resurrection" is a song by the Stone Roses and the final song on the UK version of their debut album.

The last four minutes of the song is an instrumental outro. The single was released on 30 March 1992, and reached number 33 on the UK Singles Chart. It was the second of two singles released from their debut album while the band were estranged from their label Silvertone. Physical copies of the single are no longer pressed and have become extremely difficult to come by.

== Background ==
Regarding the song's origin, drummer Reni revealed the track originated when bassist Mani played the riff of The Beatles' "Taxman" backwards. Reni said, "Mani would play the riff backwards during sound-checks and we played along over the top for a laugh. Finally we said, Let's do this joke-song properly and see what happens."

== Artwork ==
John Squire designed the "I Am the Resurrection" cover, (an up-close shot from the cover of the first album) continuing the Jackson Pollock-influenced theme of singles from The Stone Roses.

== Legacy ==
Q magazine placed it at number 10 in its list of the 100 Greatest Guitar Tracks.

NME magazine placed "I Am the Resurrection" at number 8 in its list of the 50 Greatest Indie Anthems Ever. NME also placed it at number 100 in its list of the 500 Greatest Songs of All Time.

== Religious and Messianic language ==
Biblical scholar James Crossley has noted the biblical language throughout the song, where the singer takes on the role of a Christ-like or God-like figure ("I am the resurrection and I am the life"). In addition to the title alluding to John 11, he argues that there are references to stubbornness and repentance found in the prophetic literature of the Old Testament, which repeatedly uses the language of "turning" to God, and persistence and redemption in the New Testament, which uses the language of knocking at doors (e.g. Luke 11:5-10; Luke 13:23-27). In Crossley's view, the song partly functions as "a story of God and Israel/humanity in the Bible" but now "applied to a human relationship".

== Track listings ==
7-inch vinyl (Silvertone ORE 40), cassette (Silvertone ORE 40C)

1. "I Am the Resurrection" (Pan and Scan Radio Version) (3:45)
2. "I Am the Resurrection" (Highly Resurrected Dub) (3:30)

12-inch vinyl (Silvertone ORE T 40)

1. "I Am the Resurrection" (Extended 16:9 Ratio Club Mix) by Simon Harris (8:22)
2. "I Am the Resurrection" (Original LP version) (8:12)
3. "Fools Gold" (Bottom Won Mix) (6:59)

CD (Silvertone ORE CD 40)

1. "I Am the Resurrection" (Pan and Scan Radio Version) by Simon Harris (3:45)
2. "I Am the Resurrection" (5:3 Stoned Out Club Mix) (5:40)
3. "I Am the Resurrection" (Original LP version) (8:12)
4. "Fools Gold" (Bottom Won Mix) (6:59)

== Certifications ==
Region	Certification	Certified units/sales
United Kingdom (BPI)	Platinum	600,000^{‡}
^{‡} Sales+streaming figures based on certification alone.
