= I Wanna Be Adored =

Single by the Stone Roses

from the album The Stone Roses
- B-side: "Going Down": "Simone"; "Where Angels Play"; "Sally Cinnamon (Live at The Haçienda)"
- Released: 1989 (US)
- Recorded: June 1988 – February 1989
- Genre: Indie rock; neo-psychedelia; psychedelic rock; shoegaze
- Length: 4:52 (LP and 12-inch version); 3:28 (edit and 7-inch version)
- Label: Silvertone
- Songwriters: Ian Brown; John Squire
- Producer: John Leckie

The Stone Roses singles chronology
"Fools Gold/What The World Is Waiting For" (1989)	"I Wanna Be Adored" (1989)	"One Love" (1990)

"I Wanna Be Adored" is a song by the British rock band the Stone Roses. It was the first track on their debut album, The Stone Roses, and was released as a single in the US in 1989. The single charted at number 18 on the Billboard Modern Rock chart in 1990. In 1991, the single was released in other parts of the world featuring previously unreleased B-sides.

Physical copies of the single are no longer pressed and have become extremely difficult to obtain.

== Recording ==
"I Wanna Be Adored" had been performed live by the band as early as March 1985, in a live session on Piccadilly Radio. The band had originally planned to release it as the follow-up to their 1985 debut single, "So Young", even having a sleeve designed for the single by guitarist John Squire, but ultimately shelved it alongside plans for the album they were recording at the time; this recording, which biographer John Robb described as a "slightly faster heavier version" compared to the 1989 album version, was later released on the 1996 compilation Garage Flower, whose album cover is the sleeve of the shelved "I Wanna Be Adored" single.

== Composition ==
"I Wanna Be Adored" begins with a collage of sounds. The first instrument to enter is the bass guitar, which appears 40 seconds in. This is followed by two guitars, one of which plays a pentatonic scale riff. The bass drum enters at 1:13, and the main portion of the song begins at 1:30.

The song is performed in the key of G. The song features two main sections: a four bar G–D–G–D–Em chord progression, followed by an eight-bar bridge that shifts from D to C repeatedly. The song's lyrics are minimalist, mainly consisting of the lines "I don't have/need to sell my soul; he's already in me" and the song's title repeated throughout the entire song.

== Reception ==
In 2006, the music magazine Q voted it 32nd in its list of 100 greatest songs of all time. In May 2007, NME magazine placed "I Wanna Be Adored" at number 17 in its list of the 50 Greatest Indie Anthems Ever. VH2 placed the song at number two on the Indie 500, a countdown of their top 500 indie songs of all time. Though "There Is a Light That Never Goes Out" by the Smiths was at number one, on a condensed version showing just the top 50, the two songs had swapped places, with "Adored" at number one. Stylus Magazine also included the song's bassline at number 17 in their 2005 list of the Top 50 Basslines of All Time.

== In popular culture ==
The song features in the 2005 film Green Street, as well as 2011 film I Melt with You and 2021 film Tick, Tick... Boom! The song also features in season five of American Horror Story, American Horror Story: Hotel, in the 11th episode Battle Royale. It also features in the 2019 series Chambers as a reccurent song.

The song is featured in Series 1 of the Netflix series Legends, which is set at the time of the song’s release.

It is also featured at the end of the final episode (“The Next Chapter”) of the BBC series The Elon Musk Show.

Oasis refer to the Stone Roses by quoting "I Wanna Be Adored" in their 1997 song "Magic Pie": "They are sleeping while they dream/ but then they wanna be adored".

Celtic fans incorporated the song into a chant for former player Odsonne Edouard chanting, "I wanna be Edouard".

Turnstile performed a cover of the song on Triple J in March 2026.

Sportswear company Adidas used the phrase "I Wanna Be Adored" on their 2026 Manchester United F.C. merchandise which featured John Squire's artwork inspired by Jackson Pollock's drip paintings used on Stone Roses album and single covers.

== Music video ==
The music video for "I Wanna Be Adored" was made concurrently with "Fools Gold" for the American release of the single in 1989; hence the videos share similar visual effects and scenery. The videos were both filmed near the A57 Snake Pass between Sheffield and Manchester, in the same location that Inspiral Carpets used for the video of their song "This Is How It Feels."

== Track listing ==
=== 1989 US release ===
12-inch vinyl (Silvertone 1301-1-JD)
Cassette (Silvertone 1301-4-JS)
CD (Silvertone 1301-2-JD)

1. "I Wanna Be Adored" (edit) – 3:28
2. "I Wanna Be Adored" – 4:52
3. "Going Down" – 2:46
4. "Simone" – 4:24

=== 1991 UK release ===
7-inch vinyl (Silvertone ORE 31)
Cassette (Silvertone ORE C 31)

1. "I Wanna Be Adored" – 3:28
2. "Where Angels Play" – 4:15

12-inch vinyl (Silvertone ORE T 31)

1. "I Wanna Be Adored" – 4:52
2. "Where Angels Play" – 4:15
3. "Sally Cinnamon" (Live at the Hacienda) – 3:52

CD (Silvertone ORE CD 31)

1. "I Wanna Be Adored" (7" version) – 3:28
2. "Where Angels Play" – 4:15
3. "I Wanna Be Adored" (12" version) – 4:53
4. "Sally Cinnamon" (Live at the Hacienda) – 3:52

=== 1991 Japanese release ===
CD (Silvertone/Alfa ALCB-392)

1. "I Wanna Be Adored" (12" version) – 4:53
2. "Where Angels Play" – 4:15
3. "Sally Cinnamon" (Live at the Hacienda) – 3:52
4. "Fools Gold" (Extended version) – 9:53

== Charts ==
Chart (1990–1991)	Peak position
Australia (ARIA)	141
Ireland (IRMA)	21
Luxembourg (Radio Luxembourg)	14
UK Singles (Official Charts)	20
US Alternative Airplay (Billboard)	18

== Certifications ==
Region	Certification	Certified units/sales
New Zealand (RMNZ)	Gold	15,000^{‡}
United Kingdom (BPI)	2× Platinum	1,200,000^{‡}
^{‡} Sales+streaming figures based on certification alone.
