= Made of Stone =

Single by the Stone Roses

from the album The Stone Roses
- B-side: "Going Down": "Guernica"
- Released: 6 March 1989
- Recorded: Zomba's Battery; Konk; Rockfield
- Genre: Madchester
- Length: 4:11
- Label: Silvertone
- Songwriters: Ian Brown; John Squire
- Producer: John Leckie

The Stone Roses singles chronology
"Elephant Stone" (1988)	"Made of Stone" (1989)	"She Bangs the Drums" (1989)

"Made of Stone" is a single from the Stone Roses' eponymous debut studio album. The song entered the UK singles chart on six occasions (1989, 1990, 1996, 2009, 2017 and 2022), with a peak placing of No. 20.

The band made their debut on national British TV by performing this song on the BBC's The Late Show in September 1989. A minute into the song, the power went out, prompting lead singer Ian Brown to walk off stage, cursing the venue.

The song has seen use in the 1997 American film Heaven or Vegas, and in the PSP 2005 videogame World Tour Soccer.

The B-side of "Made of Stone", "Going Down", references Jackson Pollock's No. 5, 1948. Pollock's paintings influenced the cover art that guitarist John Squire made for the single and the album. The 12" vinyl and CD's B-side "Guernica" is a reversed mix of the title track with John Squire overdubbing guitar parts and Ian Brown singing the phonetically reversed lyrics of "Made of Stone" over the top of the original vocal creating a new droning vocal which produces occasional snippets of words. The vocal effect gives the impression that the "lyrics" of "Guernica" are unrelated to those of "Made of Stone", however, when played in reverse the resemblance can be heard.

== Track listings ==
=== 1989 release ===
7-inch vinyl (Silvertone ORE 2) catalogue number in black

1. "Made of Stone" – 4:11
2. "Going Down" – 2:46

12-inch vinyl (Silvertone ORE T 2) catalogue number in black

1. "Made of Stone" – 4:11
2. "Going Down" – 2:46
3. "Guernica" – 4:23

=== 1990 reissue ===
7-inch vinyl (Silvertone ORE 2) catalogue number in blue

1. "Made of Stone" – 4:11
2. "Going Down" – 2:46

12-inch vinyl (Silvertone ORE T 2), cassette (Silvertone ORE C 2), CD (Silvertone ORE CD 2) catalogue number in blue on 12-inch vinyl

1. "Made of Stone" – 4:11
2. "Going Down" – 2:46
3. "Guernica" – 4:23

== Certifications ==
Certifications for "Made of Stone"
Region	Certification	Certified units/sales
United Kingdom (BPI)	Silver	200,000^{‡}
^{‡} Sales+streaming figures based on certification alone.
