= Madchester =

Cultural scene in 1980s–1990s Manchester

- The "Madchester" wordmark that appeared on the Happy Mondays' 1989 EP Madchester Rave On
- Years active: Late 1980s – early 1990s
- Location: Manchester, England
- Major figures: The Stone Roses; Happy Mondays; Inspiral Carpets; The Charlatans; James; 808 State
- Influences: Second Summer of Love; Acid house; Indie rock; Psychedelia
- Influenced: Britpop; Alternative dance; Electronic rock

Madchester was a musical and cultural scene that emerged in the English city of Manchester during the late 1980s, closely associated with the indie dance movement. Indie dance (also referred to as indie rave) blended indie rock with elements of acid house, psychedelia, and 1960s pop.

The term Madchester was coined by Factory Records' Tony Wilson, and was popularised by the British music press in the early 1990s. However, the origin of the term can be traced to a script meeting between Factory Records video directors Philip Shotton and Keith Jobling, known as "the Bailey Brothers." They coined Madchester while developing a script and later suggested it to Tony Wilson. Subsequently, Wilson instructed the band Happy Mondays to rename their EP from "Rave On" to "Madchester Rave On." The Happy Mondays' lead vocalist, Shaun Ryder, recalled: "It was our video directors, the Bailey Brothers, who came up with the term 'Madchester,' but we said, 'Great, yeah, go with it,' because Manchester was mad at the time."

The scene's most famous groups include the Stone Roses, Happy Mondays, Inspiral Carpets, the Charlatans, James, and 808 State. The movement was heavily influenced by the widespread use of drugs, particularly MDMA.

A major catalyst for the distinctive musical ethos in the city was the Haçienda nightclub, co-owned by members of New Order, which played a pivotal role in the movement known as the Second Summer of Love.

== Pre-Madchester ==
The music scene in Manchester immediately before the Madchester era was dominated by the Smiths, New Order, and the Fall, who became significant influences on the Madchester movement. The opening of The Haçienda nightclub in May 1982, an initiative by Factory Records, was also instrumental in shaping Manchester's popular culture. During its early years, the club primarily featured club-oriented pop music and hosted gigs by artists such as New Order, Cabaret Voltaire, Culture Club, Thompson Twins, and the Smiths. DJs like Hewan Clarke and Greg Wilson contributed to the club's prominence. By 1986, The Haçienda shifted its focus from being a live venue to a dance club.

The Festival of the Tenth Summer in July 1986, organised by Factory Records, reinforced Manchester's reputation as a hub for alternative pop culture. The festival featured film screenings, a music seminar, art exhibitions, and performances by the city's leading bands, including an all-day concert at Manchester G-Mex with A Certain Ratio, the Smiths, New Order, and the Fall. According to Dave Haslam, the festival showcased how "the city had become synonymous with larger-than-life characters playing cutting-edge music. [...] Individuals were inspired and the city was energised; of its own accord, uncontrolled."

In addition to these venues and events, the warehouse parties organised by Steve Adge were crucial in the development of the scene. The Stone Roses' warehouse parties, first held in 1985, were significant, with DJ Dave Booth supporting the Stone Roses' live performances. These parties, including the notable "Warehouse 1, The Flower Show" event on 20 July 1985, played a vital role in establishing the band's following and the burgeoning music scene in Manchester. Booth was an influential DJ in Manchester's music landscape. He co-created the Playpen nights and the Blood Club and was a resident DJ at several key venues in Manchester's alternative club network. He began his career at the Roxy Room in Pips and performed at other clubs like Devilles, Berlin, Cloud 9, and Legends, helping to create a network of venues that fostered the growth of Manchester's alternative music scene. The city's emerging bands, including the Stone Roses, frequented these clubs and drew inspiration from the diverse music played by DJs.

In 1987, the Haçienda began playing house music, with DJs Mike Pickering, Graeme Park, and "Little" Martin Prendergast hosting "Nude Night" on Fridays. The Haçienda transitioned from making a consistent loss to selling out by early 1987. During that year, it hosted performances by American house artists such as Frankie Knuckles and Adonis.

Other clubs in the Manchester area began embracing house music, including Devilles, Isadora's, Konspiracy, House, Soundgardens, and Man Alive in the city centre, as well as Bugsy's in Ashton-under-Lyne and the Osbourne Club in Miles Platting. Another key factor in the rise of Madchester was the sudden availability of the drug MDMA in the city, starting in 1987 and increasing in the following year. According to Haslam, "[MDMA] use changed clubs forever; a night at the Haçienda went from being a great night out to an intense, life-changing experience".

The British music scene was such that The Guardian later stated, "The '80s looked destined to end in musical ignominy". The Madchester movement flourished as its sound was fresh and innovative, quickly gaining popularity. Music by artists such as the Stone Roses and Happy Mondays began to chart highly in 1989, with New Order releasing the acid house-influenced Technique, which topped the UK Albums Chart.

== Beginnings ==
In October 1988, the Stone Roses released "Elephant Stone" as a single. Around the same time, the Happy Mondays released the single "Wrote for Luck," followed by the Bummed album, produced by Martin Hannett. In November, A Guy Called Gerald released his first solo single, "Voodoo Ray." Only "Voodoo Ray" achieved commercial success; however, by December of that year, a sense had begun to emerge in the British music press that something was happening in the city. According to Sean O'Hagan, writing in the NME, "There is a particularly credible music biz rumour-come [sic] theory that certain Northern towns—Manchester being the prime example—have had their water supply treated with small doses of mind-expanding chemicals. [...] Everyone from Happy Mondays to the severely disoriented Morrissey conforms to the theory in some way. Enter A Guy Called Gerald, out of his box on the limitless possibilities of a bank of keyboards."

The Stone Roses' following grew as they toured the country and released the "Made of Stone" single in February 1989. Although this did not chart, enthusiasm for the band in the music press intensified when they released their debut album, The Stone Roses (produced by John Leckie) in March. Bob Stanley (later of Saint Etienne) reviewed the Stone Roses album in Melody Maker, writing, "This is simply the best debut LP I've heard in my record-buying lifetime. Forget everybody else. Forget work tomorrow." NME did not put it quite so strongly, but reported nonetheless that it was being talked of as "the greatest album ever made." John Robb in Sounds gave the album 9/10 and stated that the Stone Roses "revolutionised British pop."

The club scene in Manchester continued to grow during 1988 and 1989, with the Haçienda launching Ibiza-themed nights in the summer of 1988 and the "Hot" acid house night (hosted by Mike Pickering and Jon DaSilva) in November of the same year.

== Baggy ==
The "baggy" sound generally combines funk, psychedelia, guitar rock, and house music. In the Manchester context, the music is primarily influenced by the indie music that had dominated the city's music scene during the 1980s, while also absorbing the various influences emerging from "the Haçienda" nightclub. Alongside the music, a distinctive style of dressing emerged that gave baggy its name. Baggy jeans (often flared, typically made by Shami Ahmed's 'Joe Bloggs' brand), along with brightly colored or tie-dye casual tops and a general 1960s style, became fashionable first in Manchester and then across the rest of the United Kingdom. This look was often topped off with a fishing hat in the style worn by the Stone Roses' drummer Alan "Reni" Wren. The overall style was a mix of rave, retro, hippie, and football casual. Many Madchester bands had football casual fans, and several bands even wore football shirts.

== Growing success ==
In mid-1989, media interest in the Manchester scene continued to grow. In September, the Happy Mondays released a Vince Clarke remix of "Wrote for Luck" as a single. In November, four significant singles were released: "Move" by the Inspiral Carpets, "Pacific State" by 808 State, the Happy Mondays EP Madchester Rave On, and "Fools Gold"/"What the World is Waiting For" by the Stone Roses. The Happy Mondays record, featuring the lead track "Hallelujah!", popularized the term "Madchester" – a term that had originally been suggested by their video directors, the Bailey Brothers, as a potential T-shirt slogan, after they coined the word for their abandoned Factory film The Mad Fuckers.

In November, the Stone Roses performed a gig at London's Alexandra Palace and were invited onto BBC Two's high-brow Late Show (during their performance, the electricity was cut off by noise-limiting circuitry, and singer Ian Brown shouted, "Amateurs, amateurs," as the presenter tried to link into the next item). On 23 November 1989, the Stone Roses and the Happy Mondays appeared on the same edition of Top of the Pops. The "Fools Gold" single reached number 8 on the UK Singles Chart, becoming the biggest-selling indie single of the year.

Madchester became something of a bandwagon from this time. According to NME journalist Stuart Maconie, the British press had "gone bonkers over Manchester bands". James were among the first beneficiaries of this. The local success of their self-financed singles "Come Home" and "Sit Down" led to a deal with Fontana, and they scored chart hits with "How Was It for You" and a re-recorded version of "Come Home" in the summer of 1990.

The Charlatans rose to prominence through appearances in Manchester, particularly as a support act to the Stone Roses, and became strongly associated with the scene. They released their debut single, "Indian Rope," in October 1989, and their second single, "The Only One I Know," made the UK top ten. A number of other Manchester bands gained the attention of the music press during 1990, including World of Twist, New Fast Automatic Daffodils, the High, Northside, the Paris Angels, and Intastella. These "second wave" bands, according to John Robb, "copped the critical backlash, but were making great music". They also received a great deal of local support, with TV appearances on various Granada shows and local radio play.

== Commercial success ==
Bands associated with the Madchester scene released material almost exclusively on indie record labels, with the significant exception of James, who signed to Fontana Records in 1989. Madchester was growing in popularity and was no longer just a local trend in Manchester, with an article entitled "Stark Raving Madchester" appearing in Newsweek Magazine in 1990, describing the Madchester scene. The main Madchester bands dominated the UK Indie Charts during late 1989 and much of 1990.

The success of several indie acts associated with the "scene" on the UK Singles and Albums charts was unprecedented at the time. "Step On" and "Kinky Afro" by the Happy Mondays both reached number 5 on the singles chart, while James scored the biggest Madchester hit, making number 2 in 1991 with a re-recording of "Sit Down." On the albums chart, the Happy Mondays reached number 4 with Pills 'n' Thrills and Bellyaches, and the Inspiral Carpets peaked at number 2 with Life. The Charlatans were the only Madchester band to reach the number 1 spot, with the album Some Friendly in the autumn of 1990.

Outside the UK, the success of Madchester was limited, although some releases gained recognition in specialist charts around the world. In the U.S., the albums The Stone Roses, Pills 'n' Thrills and Bellyaches, and Some Friendly reached the lower echelons of the U.S. albums chart. Several singles by the Stone Roses, the Inspiral Carpets, the Happy Mondays, and the Charlatans performed well on the Billboard Modern Rock Tracks chart. The Happy Mondays toured the U.S. in 1990 and charted on the Billboard Hot 100, with "Step On" reaching No. 57 in 1990. They also reached No. 1 on the Modern Rock Tracks chart with "Kinky Afro" in 1990. The only other Madchester artist to reach No. 1 on the Modern Rock Tracks chart was the Charlatans, whose single "Weirdo" was No. 1 for the week of 23 May 1992.

== Decline ==
On 27 May 1990, the Stone Roses performed at Spike Island in Widnes, supported by DJs Frankie Bones, Dave Haslam, Alfonso Buller (MVITA), Himat 'Chester' 'The Guru' Singh (MVITA), and Dave Booth. The concert was described as a "Woodstock for the E generation". A rapid succession of chart hits followed during the summer, including "One Love" by the Stone Roses, "This Is How It Feels" by the Inspiral Carpets, "The Only One I Know" by the Charlatans, and "Kinky Afro" by the Happy Mondays. The end of the year saw triumphant concerts by James and a double-header with the Happy Mondays and 808 State, both at Manchester G-Mex.

The Stone Roses cancelled their June 1990 tour of America and issued a press statement declaring, "America doesn't deserve us yet." Despite this, their debut album sold more than 350,000 copies in the U.S. that year. The band also canceled a gig in Spain and an appearance on the UK chat show Wogan. They did not appear in public again until the end of 1994, spending the intervening time in and out of studios in Wales, where they recorded the album Second Coming, while also battling in court to free themselves from their contract with Silvertone Records.

The creation of the next Happy Mondays album, Yes Please!, was also troubled, and it would not be released until October 1992. The band flew to Barbados to record it and went "crack crazy," according to Paul Ryder. They made repeated requests to Factory Records for extra time and additional funds. This is believed to have been a major factor in the bankruptcy of the label in November 1992.

With the two bands considered most central to the scene out of action, media interest in Madchester began to wane. James, the Inspiral Carpets, the Charlatans, and 808 State continued to record with varying degrees of success throughout the 1990s, but they were no longer seen as part of a localized scene. Local bands catching the tail end of Madchester, such as the Mock Turtles, became part of a broader baggy movement. The music press in the UK shifted its focus to shoegazing bands from southern England and the U.S. grunge scene, which was eventually overtaken by Britpop acts like Manchester's Oasis and London's Blur.

== Legacy ==
=== Musical legacy ===
The immediate influence of Madchester inspired the broader baggy movement in the UK, with bands from various regions of the country producing music in the early 1990s heavily influenced by the key Madchester acts. These bands included Flowered Up (from London), the Farm and the Real People (from Liverpool), the Bridewell Taxis (from Leeds), the Soup Dragons (from Glasgow) and Ocean Colour Scene (from Birmingham). Blur, from Colchester, adopted a baggy style early in their career, although in an interview with Select Magazine in 1991, they claimed to have "killed" the genre. Blur famously shared a rivalry throughout the 1990s with fellow Britpop band Oasis, who hailed from Manchester.

Bands formed in Manchester during the Madchester era included the Chemical Brothers, the Verve, Sub Sub (who would later become Doves) and Oasis (Noel Gallagher had been a roadie for the Inspiral Carpets). More broadly, the Madchester scene brought together electronic dance music and alternative rock, particularly the fusion of drumming styles from funk and disco music (and sampled in '80s hip-hop music) with jingle-jangle guitar. In the 1990s, this became a standard formula, frequently found even in the most commercial music.

Numerous polls have been conducted in the years following the Madchester movement to determine the best song of the era. In 2005, "Voodoo Ray" by A Guy Called Gerald was voted the best song from the Madchester scene. The song triumphed over "Step On" by the Happy Mondays and "Waterfall" by the Stone Roses for first place.

In 2010, a new nightclub managed by Peter Hook of New Order, FAC251, opened in Manchester, with a musical focus on Madchester music. Although the Madchester scene had faded by the mid-1990s, various bands have reformed for one-off concert tours. Notable bands that reformed in 2012 include the Stone Roses, the Happy Mondays and the Inspiral Carpets.

The Guardian critic Penny Anderson looked unfavourably upon the scene, describing it as a "breeding ground for aggressively marketed mediocrity".

The sound of the scene influenced the electronic and dance-influenced album by U2, Achtung Baby. Elysa Gardner of Rolling Stone compared the layering of dance beats into guitar-heavy mixes of the album to songs by British bands Happy Mondays and Jesus Jones. "Mysterious Ways" combines a funky guitar riff with a danceable, conga-laden beat, for what Bono described as "U2 at our funkiest... Sly and the Family Stone meets Madchester baggy". It also influenced the Cure's song "Never Enough".

=== Impact on Manchester ===
The mushrooming of Manchester's nightlife during the Madchester period has had a long-term impact, particularly with the subsequent development of the Gay Village and Northern Quarter. City centre living also began to catch on in Manchester in the wake of Madchester, a trend that continues to this day.

The attraction of the city was such that, at the height of Madchester, in 1990 the University of Manchester was the most sought-after destination for university applicants in the UK.

The scene also gave a boost to the city's media and creative industries. Channel 4 had already found success with The Word, and in its wake, the BBC launched 8:15 from Manchester, a Saturday morning kids' TV show (with a theme tune by the Inspiral Carpets, a re-write of "Find out Why"). Granada Television also jumped on the bandwagon with a cheaper version of The Word, called Juice, presented by John Bramwell and Joan Collins' daughter Tara Newley.

Organised crime became a consequence of Madchester, with the vibrancy of the clubbing scene in the city (and the popularity of illegal drugs, particularly ecstasy) creating a fertile environment for opportunist gangsterism. Violent incidents at the Haçienda led to a campaign against it by Greater Manchester Police, which contributed to its closure in 1997.

In the late 1990s, a Manchester musical walk of fame was commissioned for Oldham Street in the Northern Quarter of Manchester. The walk includes a triangular slab for each music group and pays homage to bands such as the Stone Roses, the Happy Mondays, the Inspiral Carpets, 808 State, and James.

A blue plaque marks the site of The Boardwalk, another club central to the Madchester scene, where Oasis played their first gig and Dave Haslam hosted the Yellow club night until the club's closure in 1999. It reads "Madchester venue nightclub and rehearsal rooms" and features a yellow smiley face beneath. Funkademia, a club night that began at the Boardwalk in 1995, is still held at the Mint Lounge in the Northern Quarter.

== See also ==
- Music of Manchester
- List of city nicknames in the United Kingdom
- Northern soul
- Rave
- 24 Hour Party People
