= The Stone Roses =

English rock band

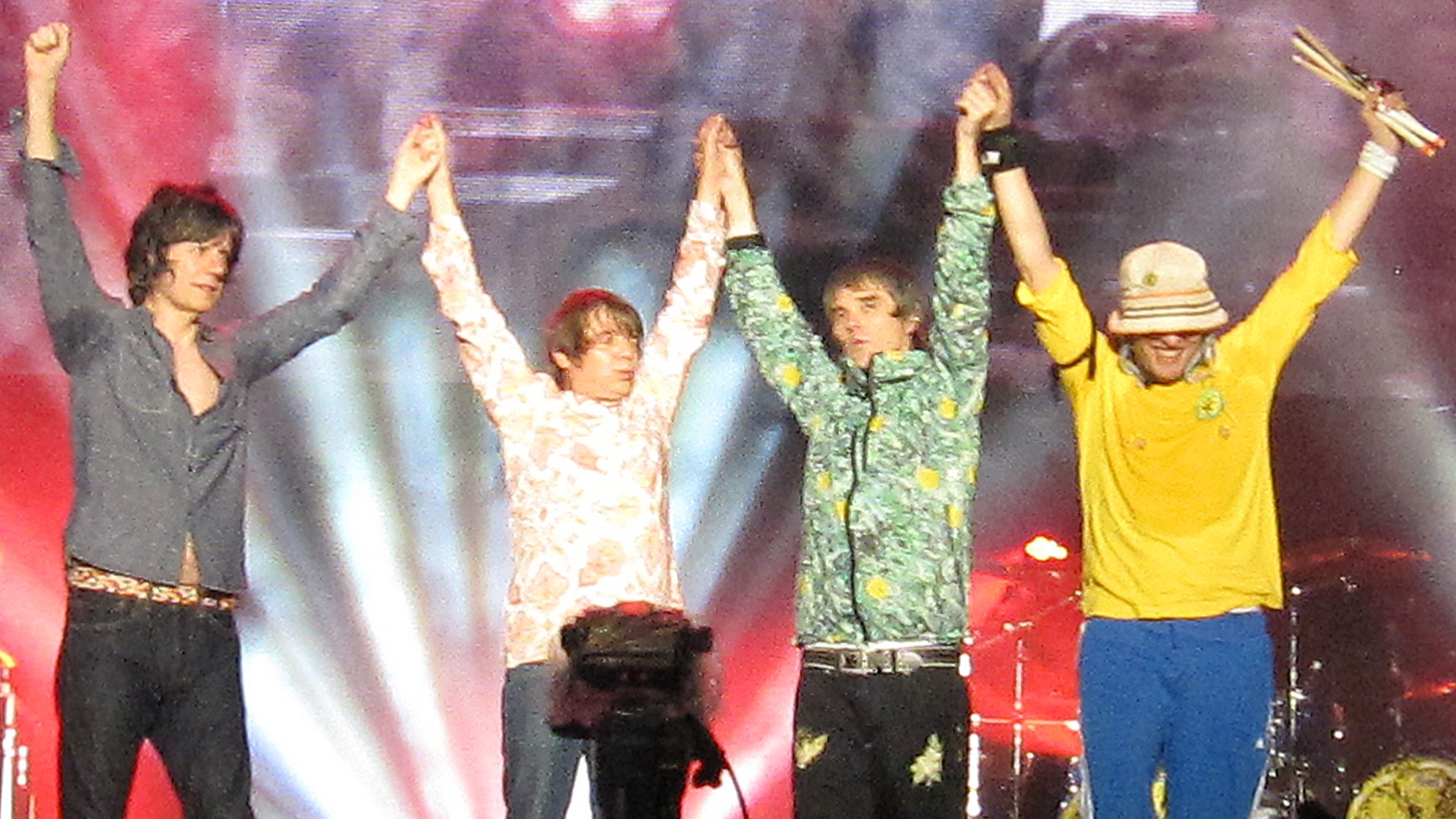
- The Stone Roses in 2012; From left: John Squire, Mani, Ian Brown, Reni

Background information
- Origin: Manchester, England
- Genres: Madchester; indie rock; jangle pop
- Works: Discography
- Years active: 1983–1996; 2011–2017
- Labels: Thin Line; Black; Silvertone; Geffen; RCA; Universal
- Past members: Ian Brown; John Squire; Alan Wren; Gary Mounfield; (see Band members section for others)

The Stone Roses were an English rock band formed in Manchester in 1983. They were one of the pioneering groups of the Madchester movement in the late 1980s and early 1990s. The band's classic and most prominent lineup consisted of the vocalist Ian Brown, the guitarist John Squire, the bassist Gary "Mani" Mounfield and the drummer Alan "Reni" Wren.

The Stone Roses released their eponymous debut album in 1989. It was a breakthrough success, being critically acclaimed and regarded by many as one of the greatest British albums. (Note: Refer to The Stone Roses (album)#Accolades) Following this success, the band sought to capitalise on their newfound fame by signing with a major label. However, their record label at the time, Silvertone, would not let them out of their contract, leading to a lengthy legal battle that culminated with the band signing with Geffen Records in 1991.

The Stone Roses released their second album, Second Coming, in 1994. It received mixed reviews. The group soon disbanded after several lineup changes throughout the supporting tour, which began with Reni departing in March 1995, followed by Squire in April 1996. Brown and Mani dissolved the remains of the group in October 1996 following their appearance at the Reading Festival.

Following much media speculation, the Stone Roses announced their reunion on 18 October 2011 and embarked on a world tour in 2012, including three homecoming shows in Heaton Park, Manchester. Plans to record a third album were also floated, but only two singles were released. In June 2012 Chris Coghill, the writer of the film Spike Island, revealed that the band "have at least three or four new tracks recorded". In June 2013 a documentary about the band's reformation, directed by Shane Meadows and titled The Stone Roses: Made of Stone, was released.

In 2016 the Stone Roses released their first new material in two decades. The band continued to tour until June 2017, at which point cryptic remarks by Brown indicated that the band had split again. This was later confirmed in a 2019 interview with Squire.

== History ==
=== Formation (1983–1984) ===
Ian Brown (initially the bassist) and the guitarist John Squire, who knew each other from Altrincham Grammar School for Boys, formed a short-lived Clash-inspired band, the Patrol, in 1980 along with the singer and guitarist Andy Couzens and the drummer Simon Wolstencroft. They played several gigs in 1980 and recorded a demo tape, but towards the end of that year, they decided on a change of direction. During their last Patrol show, Brown had a taste of being a frontman, singing the Sweet's "Block Buster!" to close the set. Pete Garner, a friend and roadie, stood in on bass while Couzens wanted to focus on guitar.

In 1981, the band members lost enthusiasm. Brown sold his bass guitar to buy a scooter, and Wolstencroft joined Johnny Marr and Andy Rourke's pre-the Smiths band Freak Party. Squire continued to practise guitar while working as an animator for Cosgrove Hall during the day, while Brown ran a Northern soul night in a Salford club.

Squire and Couzens started a new band, the Fireside Chaps, with bassist Gary "Mani" Mounfield, later recruiting a singer named David "Kaiser" Carty and drummer Chris Goodwin. They changed their name to the Waterfront (after the 1954 film On the Waterfront), their sound influenced by 1960s groups and contemporary bands such as Orange Juice. Goodwin left before the band recorded their first demo and, shortly after it, Squire asked Brown to join as singer. A meeting with Geno Washington at a party at Brown's flat in Hulme, in which Washington told Brown that he would be a star and should be a singer, convinced Brown to take Squire up on his offer. Brown joined the Waterfront in late 1983, for a time sharing vocals with Kaiser.

Like the earlier attempts at bands, the Waterfront fizzled out. In late 1983, Couzens decided to try again by starting a band and approached Brown. They decided on Wolstencroft (who had turned down the job of drummer in the Smiths) as drummer and Pete Garner as bassist (despite his admission that he could not play anything but "Block Buster!"). They also decided that they needed Squire in the band, and when he agreed the band's lineup was cemented. Leaving their previous bands behind, they worked solely on new material. Brown's vocal limitations prompted him to take singing lessons for three weeks. After rehearsing for some time without a band name, Squire came up with "The Stone Roses". Several stories later emerged suggesting that the band had initially been called "English Rose" or that the name was somehow linked to the Rolling Stones. These stories were untrue, Brown explaining: "No, I don't know where that English Rose story came from. John thought up the name 'Stone Roses'—something with a contrast, two words that went against each other". The band rehearsed for six months, during which time Wolstencroft had been auditioning for other bands, and he left to join Terry Hall's band the Colourfield. They got Goodwin to rejoin, but he lasted for only one rehearsal, so they advertised for a replacement and began auditioning, eventually recruiting Alan "Reni" Wren in May 1984.

After rehearsing and writing songs over the summer, they recorded their first demo in late August, making 100 cassettes with artwork by Squire, and set about trying to get gigs. They played their first gig as the Stone Roses on 23 October 1984, supporting Pete Townshend at an anti-heroin concert at the Moonlight Club in London. Brown had sent a demo with an accompanying letter: "I'm surrounded by skagheads, I wanna smash 'em. Can you give us a show?" The show was seen by journalists including Sounds' Garry Johnson, who arranged to interview the band a few weeks later. The band received management offers and more gigs soon followed.

Howard "Ginger" Jones, who had recently left his job as director and general manager of the Haçienda, the producer Martin Hannett and Tim Chambers agreed to work with the band on an album, setting up Thin Line Records to release it. Jones took on management of the band, although they had already made a similar agreement with Caroline Reed in London. The band got their first positive press in late December, with Johnson tipping them for success in 1985 in Sounds magazine. A feature on the band followed in January.

=== Early tour and releases (1985–1988) ===
The band played their first headlining gig on 4 January 1985, supported by Last Party, after the original headliners Mercenary Skank had pulled out. They had their first recording session with Martin Hannett in January 1985 at Strawberry Studios in Stockport, aiming to record tracks for a debut single and an album. Further sessions followed in March, during which they recorded their debut single, the double A-side "So Young"/"Tell Me". The band were invited to play a live session on Piccadilly Radio in March, premiering a new song, "I Wanna Be Adored". Tony Michaelides (aka Tony the Greek) from the station arranged for five local bands to play at Dingwalls in London on 8 February: Glee Company, Communal Drop, Fictitious Names, Laugh, and the Stone Roses. Mark Radcliffe, another Piccadilly DJ, was compère for the night. By this time, the Stone Roses had started to build a sizeable following in Manchester. Their first gig in the North of England, at Clouds in Preston, attracted a large audience and descended into a riot after technical problems and friction between the bands on the bill.

The Roses embarked on a tour of Sweden in April, with their first gig in Manchester following their return, at International 1, a venue run by the future Stone Roses managers Matthew Cummins and Gareth Evans. A performance at a warehouse party on 20 July helped to build interest in the band, and in August they returned to the studio to record their debut album. Unhappy with the results, and with the band's sound changing, it was shelved (later released as Garage Flower). The "So Young"/"Tell Me" single, however, was released on Thin Line Records in September.

Frustrated with the lack of attention they were getting locally, the band engaged in a graffiti campaign, with Ian Brown and Reni spraying the band's name on walls from West Didsbury to the city centre. This brought them negative publicity but added to their increasing notoriety. In 1986, they began working on new material, including "Sally Cinnamon", and the planned follow-up singles to "So Young" ("I Wanna Be Adored" and "This Is the One") were shelved. They parted company with Jones and took on Gareth Evans as manager, using Evans' International 1 venue as their new rehearsal space. Around this time, the band played several UK tour dates, including 11 August 1986 at the Mardi Gras club in Liverpool with local promoter and record label owner Ken Kelly and his band Innervision, at which several record company executives would be in attendance.

As Brown and John Squire began collaborating more closely on songwriting, they decided to take a larger slice of the money than the other band members. Andy Couzens and Reni left the band in protest, although they soon returned. Couzens played an ill-fated gig with the band at the end of May before being pushed out of the band by Evans after flying home alone while the rest of the band returned in their van. Although they failed to achieve further success in 1986, their repertoire expanded to include songs such as "Sugar Spun Sister", influenced by bands like the Jesus & Mary Chain and the indie-pop era Primal Scream ("Velocity Girl" being a major influence on "Made of Stone"), and they stopped playing the older songs.

In December 1986, they recorded their first demo as a four-piece, including the first studio recordings of "Sugar Spun Sister" and "Elephant Stone". In early 1987 Evans negotiated a deal with Black/FM Revolver for a one-off release on the specially created Black Records label. By the time of the release of the single "Sally Cinnamon", the group's sound had changed considerably, with chiming guitar hooks and a strong melody, alienating some of their old fans but attracting many new ones. "Sally Cinnamon" sold out its 1,000-copy run but failed to make the desired impact.

In June 1987, Pete Garner announced that he had decided to leave the band, although he stayed until they found a replacement. He played his final gig with the band at the Larks in the Park festival in Liverpool. Rob Hampson was Garner's replacement, with Garner teaching him the bass parts before leaving, although Hampson lasted only a week. A more permanent replacement was found in the form of the former Waterfront bassist Mani, who played his first gig with the band in November 1987. Brown recalled, "When Mani joined it almost changed overnight. It became a totally different groove ... Straight away, everything just fell into place".

In early 1988, the band played at Dingwalls in London, a show attended by representatives of Zomba and Rough Trade's Geoff Travis, and both subsequently wanted to sign the band. Rough Trade even funded studio time to record a single, "Elephant Stone", with Peter Hook producing. Hook was considered to produce an album for the band but was unavailable due to commitments with New Order, so Travis suggested John Leckie. In May the band played a high-profile concert at Manchester's International 2 with the band James, organised by Dave Haslam to raise funds for a campaign against Clause 28. The band attempted to usurp James by putting up posters around town listing the Stone Roses as headliners and delaying their start time to get the headline slot themselves and limit the time that James could play for. In the audience was a sixteen-year-old Liam Gallagher, who was inspired to form a band himself. Noel Gallagher also stated that he was inspired to do the same by attending one of their gigs. Also in the audience was Glaswegian Roddy McKenna, A&R executive with Zomba, who later signed the band to the label. He asked if they could be transferred internally to Andrew Lauder's newly created guitar-based Silvertone Records subsidiary. The band signed an eight-album deal, buying the "Elephant Stone" tapes from Rough Trade and releasing them as a single in October 1988.

The band were co-managed by Matthew Cummins, who died in 2007 following an accident. The DJ Dave Booth was also influential in the band's early days, supporting their live performances at warehouse parties.

=== Debut album and breakthrough success (1989–1991) ===
In 1988 and early 1989, the Stone Roses recorded their debut album at Battery Studios and Konk Studios in London and Rockfield Studios in Wales, produced by Leckie. The first single for Silvertone, "Elephant Stone", made little impact, and in early 1989 the band's performances outside the north-west were still attracting small audiences. "Made of Stone" received more press attention and was picked up for airplay by the DJ Richard Skinner on his late night Radio One show, but peaked at number ninety on the UK Singles Chart. The Stone Roses was released in April / May 1989, initially to mostly positive reviews, and entered the UK Albums Chart at number 32 in mid-May, the highest position it would reach that year. This was followed with the single "She Bangs the Drums", which gave them a top forty UK hit, and a number one on the UK Independent Chart, and by that point they were receiving much greater press attention and were selling out shows across the country. The band gained widespread notoriety when, one minute into a live 1989 TV performance on the BBC's The Late Show, the power failed, prompting Ian Brown to repeatedly squeal "Amateurs!" at Tracey MacLeod. Later in 1989, the band released a double A-side single, "Fools Gold"/"What the World Is Waiting For", which reached number eight on the UK Singles Chart in November. Originally intended as a B-side, "Fools Gold" quickly became the Roses' most famous song and a performance of it on Top of the Pops cemented their national fame. It gave them their first top ten hit and the album rose to number nineteen in the chart early the following year.

Their biggest headline gigs in 1989 were to 4,000 people at Blackpool's Empress Ballroom on Saturday 12 August and to 7,000 people at London's Alexandra Palace on Saturday 18 November. The former of these was released as a live video in 1991 and later on YouTube.

The group won four NME Readers poll awards that year; Band of the Year, Best New Band, Single of the Year (for "Fools Gold") and Album of the Year (for their debut album). The Stone Roses is now considered one of the greatest British albums, although the band themselves were unhappy with the sound on the album, Squire describing it as "twee" and not "fat or hard enough". Ian Brown was quoted in NME in December 1989 as saying: "We're the most important group in the world, because we've got the best songs and we haven't even begun to show our potential yet."

In 1990, the Stone Roses' infamous paint attack on Revolver Records occurred, as a result of a conflict between the band and the label. The band was unhappy with how the label handled the release of their single "Sally Cinnamon" and the accompanying video without their permission. To express their frustration, they decided to take matters into their own hands by visiting the label's office and throwing paint at the staff and property, including label founder Paul Birch's wife. The incident caused significant damage and led to legal consequences for the band members. In the BBC documentary Blood on the Turntable: War of the Roses, Mani said that the group asked to stop at FADS DIY store in Northenden, on the outskirts of Manchester, to get tins of paint and overalls so Squire could "do some art". The band were subsequently arrested and appeared at Wolverhampton Magistrates' Court, charged with causing £15,000–20,000 in damage. Following the incident, Mr Birch said he estimated that the media hype alone had bought the group in excess of a quarter of a million pounds in publicity. Mani said that Geezer Butler and Tony Iommi from Black Sabbath congratulated them for the incident.

The Stone Roses' outdoor concert at Spike Island in Widnes on 27 May 1990 was attended by some 27,000 people, the support acts included DJs Dave Haslam, Paul Oakenfold, Frankie Bones, Dave Booth, a Zimbabwean drum orchestra, and the reggae artist Gary Clail. The event, considered a failure at the time due to sound problems and bad organisation, has become legendary over the years as a "Woodstock for the baggy generation". In mid-2010 footage of the concert was published on YouTube.

By July, the band had released their final single for Silvertone, "One Love", which reached number four in the UK Singles Chart, their highest placing yet. It was to be the Roses' last original release for four years as they entered a protracted legal battle to terminate their five-year contract with Silvertone, unhappy with how they had been paid by the label. Silvertone owners Zomba Records took out an injunction against the band in September 1990 to prevent them from recording with any other label, but in May 1991 the court sided with the group, which was then released from its contract. The Stone Roses subsequently signed with Geffen Records (garnering a million-pound advance for their next record) and began work on their second album. However, Silvertone appealed against the ruling, delaying the record for another year.

=== Second Coming and breakup (1992–1996) ===
Following the court case, the Stone Roses separated themselves from Manchester's club culture and spent much of 1992 and 1993 travelling in Europe, before starting work on their second album in mid-1993. Progress was slow, hampered by Brown's and Squire's new fatherhood and the death of several people close to the band. John Leckie ultimately left the project as the band would not sign a production contract. Afterwards, the Stone Roses assumed production duties with engineer Simon Dawson at Rockfield Studios in Wales, where they spent 347 ten-hour days working on the album.

The Stone Roses finally released the album, Second Coming, on 5 December 1994. Mostly written by John Squire, the music now had a shady, heavy blues rock sound, dominated by Squire's guitar riffs and solos. "Love Spreads" reached number two on the UK Singles Chart. Second Coming received a mixed reception from the British press, which music journalist Simon Reynolds attributed to "the resentment that the Roses, divorced from the cultural moment that gave them meaning, were now just another band".

In March 1995, just two weeks before a tour in support of Second Coming was due to begin, Reni exited the band, following a disagreement with Ian Brown. A replacement drummer was found in Robbie Maddix, who had previously worked with Rebel MC. Also recruited around this time for the live shows was the session-keyboardist/programmer Nigel Ipinson, who had previously played with the band on the "Chic Remix" re-working of "Begging You" for its release as a single. A secret "come-back" tour of the UK was planned for April 1995 but cancelled after the music press announced the dates. A major blow was the cancellation of their engagement at the Glastonbury Festival in June 1995. John Squire had suffered a mountain-biking accident in northern California weeks before the show, breaking his collarbone. The band finally organised a full UK tour for November and December 1995 and all dates sold out in a day.

Squire announced his departure on 1 April 1996, releasing a statement saying that it was "the inevitable conclusion to the gradual social and musical separation that we have undergone in the past few years". Simply Red's 1987/88 tour guitarist Aziz Ibrahim, a former classmate of Garner at Burnage High School, was recruited as a replacement. The band continued for another six months, but there was a noticeable deterioration in the quality of its public performances after Squire's loss, and at Benicassim Festival and the Reading Festival Brown's voice was described as "so off-key it was excruciating to have to listen". The music press was united in its criticism, the NME describing "I Am the Resurrection" as "more like the eternal crucifixion". Brown and Mani dissolved the group in October 1996.

=== Post-Roses (1997–2010) ===
Brown, Squire and Mani have all had successful careers since the Roses' breakup. Squire formed the Seahorses, who released one album before breaking up, as well as releasing two solo albums. In 2007, he told a reporter that he was giving up music for good to focus on his career as a painter. Brown has released seven solo albums, a remixes and a greatest hits collection, all but one of which have charted in the top five of the UK Albums Chart. Mani joined Primal Scream as bassist in 1996 and remained in the band until the Stone Roses reunited.

Reni remained inactive for the most part after the Roses' breakup. He started a new band, The Rub, in 1999, and played several gigs, but nothing has been heard of The Rub since. In an interview in 2005, he said he was writing new songs to perform with Mani.

Rumours of a reunion surfaced and were dismissed repeatedly in the time between the break-up and the eventual reunion.

The 20th-anniversary edition of the band's debut album was released in August 2009, remastered by John Leckie and Ian Brown, including a collectors' box-set edition and the previously unreleased song "Pearl Bastard".

=== Reunion, new material and second disbandment (2011–2017) ===
After the newspaper The Sun published a story on 14 October 2011 citing that the Roses had signed for a series of gigs across the UK, rumours again began to circulate. The NME reported that Reni had responded to these rumours, contacting them with a cryptic message that read: "Not before 9T will I wear the hat 4 the Roses again". On 17 October, Dynamo told The Sun that Brown had confirmed the reunion by saying that the band were "ready to take the world by storm", and that Brown had sent him a text message with the words "It's happening". On 18 October 2011, the Stone Roses announced at a press conference the end of a fifteen-year split. An "extensive" Reunion Tour of the world, starting in Warrington, for a low-key warm-up show, was scheduled. However, the main attractions of the tour were three homecoming shows at Heaton Park, Manchester, on 29–30 June and 1 July 2012 plus one show in Dublin's Phoenix Park on 5 July 2012. In a press conference interview, the members of the Stone Roses said they had plans to record a third album. 150,000 tickets for the two Heaton Park shows sold out in 14 minutes, with the band then announcing a third show at the venue to be held on 1 July 2012. They then announced a show would take place in Ireland, with Ian Brown saying "After Manchester, Ireland is always next on our list". The first leg of the tour would consist of two warm-up gigs in Barcelona in early June and then shows in the Netherlands, Sweden, Denmark, Hungary, Germany and France.

On 2 December 2011, Brown and Squire performed together live for the first time since 1995. They joined Mick Jones from the Clash, the Farm and Pete Wylie at the Manchester Ritz in aid of the Justice for Hillsborough campaign. They performed on versions of the Clash's "Bankrobber" and "Armagideon Time" as well as the Stone Roses' "Elizabeth My Dear". On 23 May 2012, the Stone Roses held their first public concert since their reunion, playing an 11-song set before 1000 fans at Parr Hall in Warrington. The show, which was only announced that afternoon, was free to attend for those who brought a Stone Roses CD, LP or t-shirt with them.

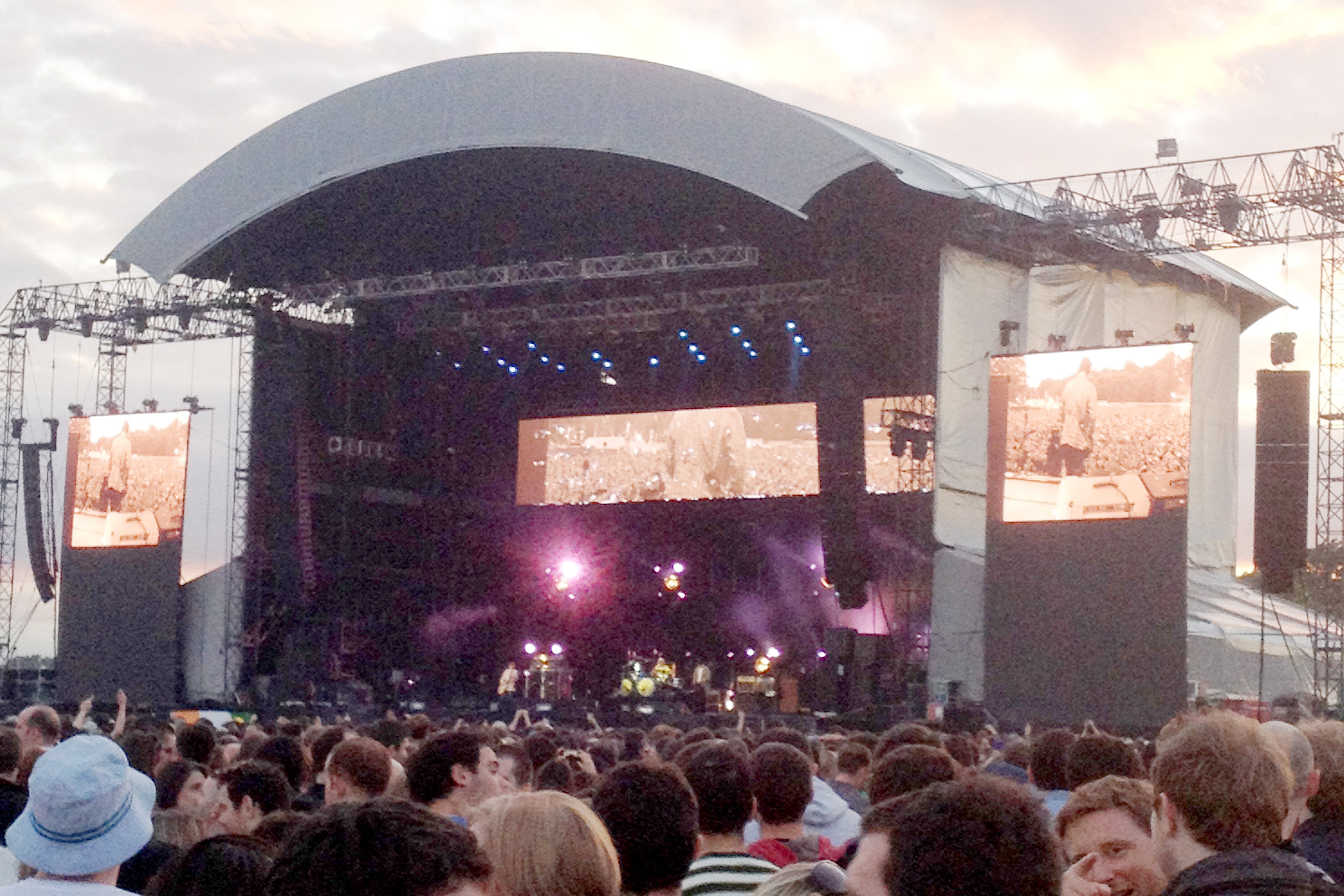
The Stone Roses live in Dublin, Ireland, during their 2012 reunion tour

On 26 November 2012, it was announced via the event's Facebook page that the band would play the Isle of Wight Festival in June 2013. The Stone Roses played at the Coachella Valley Music and Arts Festival on 12 and 19 April 2013. The Stone Roses also played at Finsbury Park, London, on 7 and 8 June 2013 and Glasgow Green, Glasgow, on 15 June 2013.

A documentary was planned for the Stone Roses' reunion, with film director Shane Meadows chosen to film it. The documentary, titled The Stone Roses: Made of Stone, received its world premiere at Trafford Park in Manchester on 30 May 2013 and was simultaneously broadcast live in many cinemas across the United Kingdom. It had its general release on 5 June 2013.

On 2 November 2015, the band announced two gigs at Manchester's City of Manchester Stadium on 17 and 18 June 2016 (a further two shows being added on 15 and 19 after these sold out), and a headline slot at the T in the Park 2016 festival on 8 July 2016 at Strathallan Castle, Scotland.

On 12 May 2016, the band released "All for One", their first new release in more than 20 years. A second single, titled "Beautiful Thing", was released on 9 June.

On 26 September 2016, the band announced three stadium gigs in the UK for 2017: the SSE Arena in Belfast (Odyssey Complex) on 13 June, Wembley in London on 17 June and Hampden Park in Glasgow on 24 June. In December 2016, two more dates were added at the Leeds First Direct Arena on 20 and 21 June 2017.

On 24 June 2017, the Stone Roses played at Hampden Park in Glasgow. During the performance Brown addressed the crowd with the statement "Don't be sad that it's over, be happy that it happened", leading many to speculate that the performance would be their final concert. This would turn out to be true as, on 16 September 2019, Squire confirmed in an interview with The Guardian that the band had disbanded.

Pete Garner, the original bassist for the Stone Roses, died at the age of 59 in November 2023. Mani died on 20 November 2025 at the age of 63. A tribute concert took place on the 30th of May 2026, with former member of the band Aziz Ibrahim performing alongside Puressence, Cast, Peter Hook and Tom Meighan.

== Musical style and influences ==
The Stone Roses' influences included garage rock, electronic dance music, krautrock, northern soul, punk rock, reggae, soul and artists such as the Beatles, the Rolling Stones, Simon and Garfunkel, the Smiths, the Byrds, Jimi Hendrix, Led Zeppelin, the Jesus and Mary Chain, Sex Pistols and the Clash.

The band were part of the Madchester music scene, a music scene that mixed alternative rock, psychedelic rock and electronic dance music.

The band went on to influence other artists, most notably Oasis and the Verve; Oasis's Noel Gallagher was quoted in an interview saying that "when I heard 'Sally Cinnamon' for the first time, I knew what my destiny was". Gallagher's brother and Oasis' lead singer Liam stated that they were the first band he saw live and that seeing them perform influenced him to become a singer. Kevin Cummins, photographer of the 18 November 1989 NME cover displaying the Stone Roses in blue paint, was reportedly told it was "the greatest NME cover of all time" by Liam Gallagher and Richard Ashcroft.

The band is closely associated with the English Premier League football club Manchester United, with three of the band's four founding members being supporters of the club. The band's single "This is the One" has been played before Manchester United home matches at Old Trafford since the early 2000s. In 2024 and 2026, the band partnered with Manchester United and their kit supplier Adidas to launch a clothing line based around the band's iconography

== Relationship with the media ==
As John Robb commented: "The Stone Roses would stonewall the journalist[s]. With shy guffaws, muttered asides, dispassionate staring, foot-shuffling silences and complete mind-numbing gaps, punctuated by the odd piece of incisive home-spun philosophy from Brown, who occasionally hinted at a well-read mind. There would be complete silence from John Squire, witty banter from Reni, and Mani spouting off if he let his guard drop." However, Robb clarified they "were no fools when it came to the media". He concluded: "One feature of the band's career had been their ability to stay on the news pages of the rock press almost permanently for years on end, including the years when they did fuck all. And they did this by hardly saying anything at all."

== Band members ==
=== Principal lineup ===
- Ian Brown – lead vocals, percussion, harmonica (1983–1996, 2011–2017)
- John Squire – lead guitar, backing vocals (1983–1996, 2011–2017)
- Alan "Reni" Wren – drums, percussion, backing vocals, occasional piano (1984–1995, 2011–2017)
- Gary "Mani" Mounfield – bass (1987–1996, 2011–2017; died 2025), acoustic guitar (1995; live only)

=== Other members ===
- Pete Garner – bass (1983–1987; died 2023)
- Andy Couzens – rhythm guitar, backing vocals (1983–1986)
- Simon Wolstencroft – drums (1983–1984)
- Rob Hampson – bass (1987)
- Stephen "Cressa" Cresser – dancing (1988–1990)
- Robbie Maddix – drums, percussion, backing vocals (1995–1996)
- Nigel Ipinson – keyboards, piano, backing vocals (1995–1996)
- Aziz Ibrahim – lead guitar (1996)

== Discography ==
- The Stone Roses (1989)
- Second Coming (1994)

== Works cited ==
- Haslam, Dave (2000) Manchester, England, Fourth Estate, ISBN 1-84115-146-7
- McCready, John. "So Near So Far". MOJO, May 2002
- Reynolds, Simon. "The Stone Roses: The Morning After". Spin, May 1995
- Robb, John (2001). The Stone Roses and the Resurrection of British Pop. Random House. ISBN 0-09-187887-X.
- Strong, Martin C. (2003) The Great Indie Discography, Canongate, ISBN 1-84195-335-0
- Taylor, Steve (2004) The A to X of Alternative Music, Continuum, ISBN 0-8264-7396-2
- "The Stone Roses: The 20th anniversary of the greatest debut album ever". New Musical Express. 15 April 2009.
