= Silvertone Records (1980) =

British record label owned by Sony Music UK

Silvertone Records is a British record label owned by Sony Music UK. Originally an independent label under Clive Calder's Jive Records, it was eventually acquired by the Bertelsmann Music Group (BMG). This original BMG entity later merged with Sony Music, bringing the Jive catalogue to Sony as part of the Zomba Music Group. In 2017, Sony Music UK relaunched Silvertone as a label for left-field artists, signing acts from the indie, alt-folk, blues, and jazz genres.

The first and most notable signing to the label was the Stone Roses in the late 1980s, with whom the label later engaged in a protracted legal dispute. According to Jeff Fenster, former Senior VP of A&R at Jive Records/Silvertone Records, Silvertone began as a roots rock-focused label but evolved into an alternative music label. After Zomba acquired several Christian music labels, acts like Jars of Clay were transferred to Silvertone, where they released two platinum-selling records as part of the label's roster.

== Silvertone Artists ==
Artists signed to Silvertone since 2017 include Hugh Cornwell, Hailey Tuck, Joanne Shaw Taylor, and Wildwood Kin. In 2021, Bobby Gillespie of Primal Scream and Jehnny Beth of Savages collaborated on an album titled Utopian Ashes, which was released by Sony Legacy through the Silvertone label.

Other acts signed to the label throughout its history include Chris Duarte, Whiteout, John Mayall, Buddy Guy, the Men They Couldn't Hang, Bowling for Soup, Alan Wren, Matt Odmark, John Squire, Stephen Mason (solo), Mick Weaver, Gary Mounfield, Metal Molly, Del Shannon, the Lost Soul Band, Loudon Wainwright III and Mary My Hope.

== See also ==
- Lists of record labels
- Silvertone Records (disambiguation)
