= Rafters (nightclub) =

Nightclub in Manchester, England

- Logo from 1979 poster

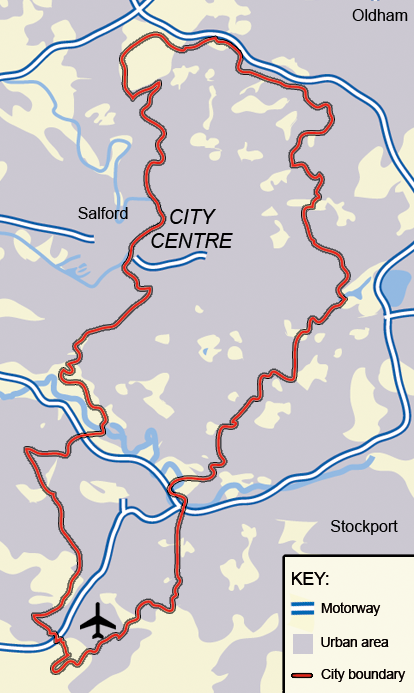
- Location in Manchester
- Address: 65, Oxford Street (St. James Buildings)
- Location: Manchester, England
- Coordinates: 53°28′31″N 02°14′29″W
- Capacity: 1,000
- Type: Nightclub
- Event: Rock

Construction
- Opened: Start of the 1970s
- Renovated: Renamed to Jilly's in 1983, to MusicBox in 1992

Rafters, later known as Jilly's, was a nightclub located in St. James Buildings, Oxford Street, Manchester, England. Some well-known bands played concerts at Rafters in the 1970s and 1980s.

Rob Gretton, who went on to become the manager of Joy Division, worked at Rafters. The club was featured in the biographical film Control (2007).

== History ==
Rafters opened in Manchester in the 1970s in St James's Buildings in Oxford Street. The schedule generally remained the same: live gigs on Monday and Wednesday nights and a folk night on Tuesday. By the mid-1970s the venue had become better known by the public and musicians, and leading musical bands began to play there. Following the rise of punk rock in 1976 and 1977, the venue became one of the main places in Manchester for live music. Joy Division performed there and in other Manchester venues such as Rock World.

Numerous new bands played in Rafters in 1977 among them Paul Young of Sad Café and Dougie James. At this time Rob Gretton was one of the DJs at the club and also became a leading figure in the Manchester punk scene. The Stiff Records Test (Chiswick Challenge) organised by Stiff Records took place here on 14 April 1978. The event proved significant in the history of the band Joy Division. Rob Gretton and Tony Wilson of Granada TV were present at the event and saw Joy Division play. Joy Division were the last of 17 bands to play, but made a strong impression on those at the concerts. As Gretton commented:

So they went on about ten to two and they were blazing madmen. And I just went and watched them. Great! Best band I've ever seen – and they sent a tingle up my spine. And I was dancing all over...I went up telling them - at the end - telling them how brilliant I thought it was ... And I went raving about them all next day

— Rob Gretton, about Rafters club, memories about Stiff Records Test

In 1978, the memorable DJ partnership of Colin Curtis and John Grant established the region's leading jazz-funk night at Rafters. The club closed in 1983. In its final years the DJ was Mike Shaft who appeared on Piccadilly Radio with Takin' Care of Business, though he resigned one night after being informed by the management that they felt that 'the club was becoming too black' for them. After that the club was renamed as Jilly's which existed to 1993, after which the club was called Music Box, the site of the Electric Chair club nights, which moved there from The Roadhouse in the late 90s and were hugely influential until they came to an end in 2008.

== Concerts ==
1977 concerts
Date	Musician(s)	Tour	Notes
31 May	Johnny Thunders & the Heartbreakers & Joy Division	Warsaw Tour	--
30 June	Generation X & Joy Division	Warsaw Tour	--
1 September	Buzzcocks & Distractions	--	--
8 September	London & The Swords	--	--
13 October	The Yachts & Joy Division	Warsaw Tour	--
23 October	Alberto Y Los Trios Paranoias	--	"Teenage Paradise" song included in So It Goes TV series (Series 2, show 3)
24 November (Note: It is not known if there was one concert or two. "?? December 1977: Rafters, Manchester". Joy Division Concerts. Joy Division central. pp. 1977 (Warsaw).)	The Heat & Accelerator & Joy Division	Warsaw Tour	--

1978 concerts
Date	Musician(s)	Tour	Notes
26 January	Magazine		
4 March	Cock Sparrer	--	--
16 March	Generation X & support	--	--
18 March	The Pleasers & Heat	--	--
20 March	Little Bob Story & Doo Wop Saints	--	--
21 March	Whitesnake & Virginia Wolf	--	--
23 March	Suburban Studs & The Elite	--	--
25 March	The Saints & The Snyde	--	--
28 March	The Zones & The Winners & Joy Division	1978 Joy Division Tour	--
14 April	Fly & Ed Banger & Prime Time Suckers & Jilted John & 2.3 & V2 & The Yo-Yo's & Time Out & Mike King & The Tunes & Joy Division	1978 Joy Division Tour	Left in the form of album Keep On Keepin' On (Note: Info from Joy Division#Early releases)
10 June	Buzzcocks & Subway Sect	--	--
27 June	Dire Straits	Dire Straits Tour	--

1980–83 concerts
Date	Year	Musician(s)	Tour	Notes
4 December	1980	Throbbing Gristle	--	Left in the form of album Rafters Club (IRCD 39) and TGV DVD set (Note: Info from TGV DVD set page) and TG+ DVD set (Note: Info from TG+ DVD set)
5 August	1981	Depeche Mode	Speak & Spell Tour	
13 December	1982	The Southern Death Cult	--	Two songs left in the form of album The Southern Death Cult (Note: Info from The Southern Death Cult album page. Songs named "Crow" and "Faith".)

1986 concerts
Date	Musician(s)	Tour	Notes
17 July	Easterhouse, Happy Mondays and the Weeds	"Back in the Cellar" (Festival of the Tenth Summer) (Note: Info from Festival of the Tenth Summer page)	--
