= Festival of the Tenth Summer =

- Genre: Electronic dance music, etc.
- Dates: 12 July and 19 July 1986
- Location: Manchester
- Years active: 1986

The Festival of the Tenth Summer was a music and art festival that took place in Manchester in July 1986. The festival was organised by Factory Records to 'celebrate Manchester' specifically with reference to the first performance by the Sex Pistols at the Lesser Free Trade Hall in Manchester on 4 June 1976. It consisted of ten events, culminating in an all day music festival at the Greater Manchester Exhibition Centre on 19 July 1986. The festival has its own number in the Factory Records catalogue, FAC 151.

== The Events ==
The ten events took place between 12 July and 20 July 1986 and were as follows:

1. "installation/the other decade" by Peter Saville Associates at the City Art Gallery
2. "clothes" at The Haçienda, presented, (Andrew Obaje AKA Jelly Universe), Breed 86, Su Barnes, William Tailoring, Dawn Campbell, Geese by The Haçienda and The Green Room 13 July 1986
3. "cummins ten", an exhibition by photographer Kevin Cummins at the Cornerhouse
4. "the back pages" a book by Richard Boon, Cath Carroll and others
5. Six music events across the city: "the great hall show": Margi Clarke sings 'Chaos in Cancerland' plus The Durutti Column at Manchester Town Hall, 14 July 1986; "Blanco meet Creation at the Factory": The Bodines and James at PSV/The Russell Club, Hulme, 15 July 1986; "The Eagle has Landed" at The International 16 July 1986; "Back in the Cellar": Easterhouse, Happy Mondays and the Weeds at Rafters 17 July 1986; "More labels than one": The Railway Children and Distant Cousins at the Boardwalk 18 July 1986; "Later that night": The Faction at the Gallery 18 July 1986
6. "the new, new music seminar" at The Gay Traitor, The Haçienda 12–20 July 1986
7. Merchandising: T-shirt, badge, posters, postcards and boiler suit by Peter Saville Associates and Acme Total Merchandising
8. "the different kitchen": exposition of music graphics by Malcolm Garrett, Linder, Richard Boon, Peter Saville, Jon Savage, Mark Farrow, David Crow, Ian Swift, Mark Zimmerli, Claus Castenskiold/The Fall, Stephen Horse, The Smiths/Caryn Gough and Trevor Johnson. Curated by Malcolm Garrett / Assorted iMaGes at Cavendish House, Manchester Polytechnic.
9. Film and Video at the Cornerhouse, including showings of Stop Making Sense, The Great Rock and Roll Swindle, Rude Boy and Born in Flames, as well as the European premieres of Pretty in Pink and Sid and Nancy.
10. G-Mex – The Tenth Event, an all day festival featuring A Certain Ratio, The Smiths, New Order, The Fall, Cabaret Voltaire, Wayne Fontana and the Mindbenders, Orchestral Manoeuvres in the Dark, Pete Shelley/Buzzcocks, Luxuria, The Worst, Sandie Shaw, John Cale, John Cooper Clarke and Margi Clarke. The event was compered by Paul Morley and Bill Grundy.

== See also ==
- List of electronic music festivals
