= Code: Selfish =

Studio album by The Fall
- Released: 23 March 1992
- Recorded: Late 1991
- Studio: AIR Studios, London and Glasgow
- Genre: Alternative rock; post-punk; alternative dance
- Length: 54:22
- Label: Fontana
- Producer: Craig Leon; Simon Rogers; Mark E. Smith

The Fall chronology
Shift-Work (1991)	Code: Selfish (1992)	The Infotainment Scan (1993)

Singles from Code: Selfish
- 1. "Free Range" Released: 2 March 1992; 2. "Ed's Babe" Released: 22 June 1992

Professional ratings
Review scores
Source	Rating
AllMusic	3/5 stars
NME	9/10
Pitchfork	7.5/10
Select	3/5 medals
Uncut	9/10

Code: Selfish is a 1992 LP by British rock band The Fall. Their 14th full-length studio album, it entered the UK chart at number 21, although it spent only one week on the chart.

The album is characterised by its harsher sound in relation to the previous year's Shift-Work, and is influenced by techno music (techno fan Dave Bush had been added on keyboards and computers). Despite this, the album also has some notably mellow moments, with "Time Enough At Last" (named after an episode of The Twilight Zone) and "Gentlemen's Agreement" being at odds with the overall sound of the album.

Largely recorded in a converted church in Glasgow, Code: Selfish features the group's only self-penned Top 40 single, "Free Range". The album would prove to be their last for the Phonogram label, as the group were dropped following the release of the Ed's Babe EP later in 1992. Simon Ford reports in his Fall biography Hip Priest that Phonogram had to compensate the band for the early termination of their five-album deal and that these funds were used to record what became The Infotainment Scan.

The album was re-released by Voiceprint in 2002 under licence from Phonogram, and also appeared in a double-CD set coupled with an edition of Shift-Work on the same label in 2003. This edition added "Ed's Babe" and "Free Ranger" to the track listing. It was reissued again in expanded and remastered form by Universal in May 2007.

According to keyboard player Dave Bush, the song "Immortality" was partly inspired by Milan Kundera's 1990 novel of the same name.

== Track listing ==
No.	Title	Writer(s)	Length
1.	"The Birmingham School of Business School"	Mark E. Smith, Dave Bush	6:45
2.	"Free Range"	Smith, Simon Wolstencroft	3:58
3.	"Return"	Smith, Steve Hanley	4:04
4.	"Time Enough at Last"	Smith, Craig Scanlon	3:48
5.	"Everything Hurtz"	Smith, Hanley	4:07
6.	"Immortality"	Smith, Scanlon	4:30
7.	"Two-Face!"	Smith, Scanlon	6:01
8.	"Just Waiting"	Hank Williams	4:38
9.	"So Called Dangerous"	Smith, Bush, Hanley	3:46
10.	"Gentlemen's Agreement"	Smith, Scanlon	4:33
11.	"Married, 2 Kids"	Smith, Scanlon, Hanley	2:45
12.	"Crew Filth"	Smith, Wolstencroft	5:20
Total length:			54:22

2002 reissue bonus tracks
No.	Title	Writer(s)	Length
13.	"Ed's Babe"	Smith, Scanlon	3:17
14.	"Free Ranger"	Smith, Wolstencroft	4:04
Total length:			61:43

=== 2007 reissue ===
Disc one

- as per original edition

Disc two

No.	Title	Writer(s)	Length
1.	"Free Range" (single version)	Smith, Wolstencroft	4:21
2.	"Return" (slightly alternate version found on "Free Range" single)	Smith, Hanley	4:04
3.	"Dangerous" (slightly alternate version of "So-Called Dangerous", from the "Free Range" single)	Smith, Hanley, Bush	4:01
4.	"Everything Hurtz" (slightly alternate version found on "Free Range" single)	Smith, Hanley	4:07
5.	"Ed's Babe" (from the "Ed's Babe" EP)	Smith, Scanlon	3:17
6.	"Pumpkin Head Xscapes" (from the "Ed's Babe" EP)	Smith, Scanlon, Hanley	3:49
7.	"The Knight, the Devil and Death" (from the "Ed's Babe" EP)	Smith, Scanlon, Wolstencroft	3:23
8.	"Free Ranger" (remix of "Free Range", from the "Ed's Babe" EP)	Smith, Wolstencroft	4:04
9.	"Noel's Chemical Effluence" (outtake, previously released on The Twenty-Seven Points, 1995)	Smith	6:24
10.	"Legend of Xanadu" (previously released on NME compilation CD Ruby Trax, 1992)	Ken Howard, Alan Blaikley	3:29
11.	"Free Range" (BBC John Peel Session, recorded 19 January 1992)	Smith, Wolstencroft	4:05
12.	"Kimble" (BBC John Peel Session, recorded 19 January 1992; released as a single later the same year)	Lee "Scratch" Perry	3:55
13.	"Immortality" (BBC John Peel Session, recorded 19 January 1992)	Smith, Scanlon	4:27
14.	"Return" (BBC John Peel Session, recorded 19 January 1992)	Smith, Hanley	4:10
Total length:			57:43

== Personnel ==
The Fall

- Mark E. Smith – vocals, tapes, production
- Craig Scanlon – lead and rhythm guitars
- Steve Hanley – bass guitar
- Simon Wolstencroft – drums, keyboards
- Dave Bush – keyboards, machines

Additional personnel

- Craig Leon – keyboards, production
- Simon Rogers – keyboards, production
- Cassell Webb – backing vocals
- Pascal Le Gras – cover art
- Dale Griffin – production on John Peel sessions
- The Fall – production on "Legend of Xanadu" (recorded at Suite 16, Rochdale, Greater Manchester)
