= Pigs + Battleships =

- Original 1985 LP sleeve

Studio album by Quando Quango
- Released: November 1985
- Recorded: Strawberry Studios, Stockport, England, December 1984
- Genre: New wave, dance
- Label: Factory - FACT-110, Pow Wow Records, LTM Recordings, Factory Benelux
- Producer: Mark Kamins

Pigs + Battleships (or Pigs and Battleships on the cassette version) is the only studio album released by the British, Manchester-based new wave and dance project Quando Quango. It was produced by American producer Mark Kamins at Strawberry Studios, Stockport with mixing taking place at Shakedown Studio, New York, USA and Genetik Studio, England. The artwork was designed by Alan David-Tu with photography by Kevin Cummins. Pigs + Battleships includes the majority of the group's studio output and features the singles "Go Exciting", "Genius", and on UK Cassette and US editions "Love Tempo" is also included.

The album was released on LP and Cassette in November 1985 by Factory Records and peaked at number seventeen on the UK Indie Chart. US editions include "Love Tempo (Remix)" instead of "Low Rider".

The album has since been re-issued on CD twice with differing bonus tracks. The 2003 CD reissue by LTM Recordings includes singles, remixes and b-sides. The 2013 CD reissue by Factory Benelux include a BBC session, a mix of "Genius" and the retains the mix of "Love Tempo" that appears on UK Cassette and US editions of the album.

The album was named after the 1961 film Pigs and Battleships (豚と軍艦, Buta to gunkan), directed by Shohei Imamura.

== Track listing ==
All tracks are written by B. Johnson, M. Pickering and G. Rietveld.

Original release
| No. | Title | Length |
|---|---|---|
| 1. | "Genius" | 6:19 |
| 2. | "Go Exciting" | 5:50 |
| 3. | "Happy Boy" | 5:05 |
| 4. | "Rebel" | 5:38 |
| 5. | "This Feeling" | 5:01 |
| 6. | "S.T." | 4:36 |
| 7. | "40 Dreams" | 5:51 |
| 8. | "Low Rider" (absent from US LP (Pow Wow)) | 4:20 |
| 9. | "Love Tempo (Remix)" (only appears on US LP (Pow Wow) and UK Cassette (Factory)) | 7:05 |

2003 CD reissue bonus tracks (LTM LTMCD-2360)
| No. | Title | Length |
|---|---|---|
| 9. | "Love Tempo (Remix)" (aka "New York Mix") | 7:52 |
| 10. | "Atom Rock (Remix)" | 7:30 |
| 11. | "Triangle" | 6:50 |
| 12. | "Tingle" | 5:19 |
| 13. | "Go Exciting (Original Mix)" | 5:49 |

2013 CD reissue bonus tracks (Factory Benelux FBN-110-CD)
| No. | Title | Length |
|---|---|---|
| 9. | "Love Tempo (Remix)" | 7:05 |
| 10. | "Atom Rock (BBC)" | 5:11 |
| 11. | "Triangle (BBC)" | 3:47 |
| 12. | "Swampland (BBC)" | 4:38 |
| 13. | "S.T. (BBC)" | 5:43 |
| 14. | "Genius (PT 2)" | 6:50 |

== Personnel ==
- Mike Pickering - saxophone, vocals
- Gonnie Rietveld - keyboards, vocals
- Simon Topping - percussion, vocals
- Barry Johnson - bass, rhythm guitar
- Beverly McDonald - vocals
- The A Team - trombone, trumpet
- Andy Connell - keyboards
- Vini Reilly - guitar
- Derek Johnson - toaster
- Johnny Marr - guitar ("Atom Rock (Remix)", "Triangle")

Production

- Mark Kamins - producer, remix ("Love Tempo (Remix)", "Atom Rock (Remix)")
- Bernard Sumner - producer ("Love Tempo (Remix)", "Atom Rock (Remix)", "Triangle")
- Donald Johnson - producer ("Tingle", "Go Exciting (Original Mix)"), co-producer ("Love Tempo (Remix)", "Atom Rock (Remix)", "Triangle")
- Tim Oliver - engineer
- Alan Meyerson - mix
- Paul "Groucho" Smylik - mix ("This Feeling")
- Ivan Ivan - ace snip job ("Genius")
- Kevin Cummins - group photography
- Alan David-Tu - sleeve

Technical

- Recorded at Strawberry Studios, Stockport, England, December 1984
- Mixed at Shakedown Studio New York, USA February 1985
- "This Feeling" mixed at Genetik Studio, England
- Publisher Island Music Ltd.
- Tracks 10 to 13 on 2013 CD reissue are a BBC radio session recorded for David 'Kid' Jensen on 8 March 1984.
