= The Twenty-Seven Points =

Live album by The Fall
- Released: 7 August 1995
- Recorded: 1991–1995
- Venues: Prague, Tel Aviv, London, Glasgow, New York City and Manchester
- Genre: Post-punk
- Length: 1:40:05
- Label: Permanent Records
- Producer: none credited

The Fall chronology
| Cerebral Caustic (1995) | The Twenty-Seven Points (1995) | The Light User Syndrome (1996) |

Professional ratings
Review scores
| Source | Rating |
|---|---|
| AllMusic | 3/5 stars |
| The Encyclopedia of Popular Music | 3/5 stars |
| The New Rolling Stone Album Guide | 2.5/5 stars |

The Twenty-Seven Points: Live 92–95 is a double album by the Fall, released in 1995. The album consists of live recordings made in various locations between 1991 and 1995, but also contains interludes and two previously unheard studio tracks. Credits on the album are sketchy but the front cover lists the cities in which the tracks were recorded; Prague, Tel Aviv, London, Glasgow, New York City and Manchester.

== Critical reception ==
Trouser Press wrote: "Composed of live tracks, rough demos and random interpolations from Glasgow, London, Manchester, New York, Prague and Tel Aviv, the 28-track, two-CD set is frustratingly uneven but ultimately captures the Fall live experience, complete with onstage disasters."

== Track listing ==
Titles are given exactly as listed on the original sleeve.

=== Disc one ===
| No. | Title | Writer(s) | Length |
|---|---|---|---|
| 1. | "Mollusc in Tyrol" (brief excerpt of the released track played over a PA as an intro tape, not an actual live rendition) | Mark E. Smith, Craig Leon (Note: Credited to Leon on album cover.) | 1:01 |
| 2. | "Return" | M. Smith, Steve Hanley | 3:49 |
| 3. | "Ladybird (Green Grass)" | M. Smith, Craig Scanlon, Hanley, Dave Bush, Simon Wolstencroft (Note: Credited to M. Smith and Scanlon on album cover.) | 4:08 |
| 4. | "Idiot - Walk Out" (an aborted "Idiot Joy Showland" recorded live October 19, 1993, at the Kentish Town Forum in London) | M. Smith, Hanley (Note: Credited to M. Smith, Hanley and Scanlon on album cover.) | 0:53 |
| 5. | "Ten Points" (a recording of Smith reciting a draft of the lyrics to "Glam Racket", played over the PA) | M. Smith | 1:56 |
| 6. | "Idiot Joy Showland" (recorded live October 19, 1993, at the Kentish Town Forum in London) | M. Smith, Hanley (Note: Credited to M. Smith, Hanley and Scanlon on album cover.) | 4:16 |
| 7. | "Big New Prinz" | M. Smith, Scanlon, Hanley, Marcia Schofield (Note: Credited to M. Smith on album cover.) | 6:02 |
| 8. | "Intro - Roadhouse" (a John Barry recording used as an intro tape) | John Barry (Note: Credited to M. Smith on album cover.) | 1:30 |
| 9. | "The Joke" (recorded live March 21, 1995, at the Roadhouse in Manchester) | M. Smith, Brix Smith | 3:37 |
| 10. | "M.H.'s Jokes" (a dictaphone recording of Smith chatting with a friend - likely Mike "The Haircut" Hill) | (no writer credited) | 1:43 |
| 11. | "British People in Hot Weather" | M. Smith, Scanlon, Hanley, Wolstencroft (Note: Credited to M. Smith, Scanlon and Hanley on album cover.) | 2:03 |
| 12. | "Free Range" | M. Smith, Simon Wolstencroft (Note: Credited to M. Smith on album cover.) | 3:49 |
| 13. | "Hi-Tension Line" | M. Smith, Scanlon, Hanley (Note: Credited to M. Smith and Hanley on album cover.) | 4:16 |
| 14. | "The League of Bald-Headed Men" | M. Smith, Hanley (Note: Credited to M. Smith on album cover.) | 4:29 |

Note

- Tracks 10 and 11 are listed on the cover as one track but indexed as 2 on the actual disc.

=== Disc two ===
| No. | Title | Writer(s) | Length |
|---|---|---|---|
| 1. | "95: Glam Racket/Star" (two separate live recordings spliced together) | M. Smith, Scanlon, Hanley | 3:29 |
| 2. | "Lost in Music" | Nile Rodgers, Bernard Edwards | 4:24 |
| 3. | "Prague '91/Mr Pharmacist" | Jeff Nowlen (Note: Credited to M. Smith and Nowlen on album cover.) | 3:10 |
| 4. | "Cloud of Black" (studio track; outtake from the Shift-Work sessions) | M. Smith | 4:22 |
| 5. | "Paranoid Man in Cheap Sh..t Room" | M. Smith, Scanlon | 4:15 |
| 6. | "Bounces - Leeds" ("Life Just Bounces" sung by Burns) | M. Smith, Scanlon | 1:57 |
| 7. | "Outro" | (no writer credited) | 2:49 |
| 8. | "Passable" (actually "A Past Gone Mad") | M. Smith, Bush, Wolstencroft | 4:30 |
| 9. | "Glasgow Advice" (spoken word by Smith played over the PA) | M. Smith | 1:14 |
| 10. | "Middle Class Revolt - Simon, Dave and John" | M. Smith, Scanlon, Hanley | 4:34 |
| 11. | "Bill is Dead" | M. Smith, Scanlon | 5:14 |
| 12. | "Strychnine" | Gerry Roslie | 2:49 |
| 13. | "War!" | Peter Blegvad, Anthony Moore | 3:26 |
| 14. | "Noel's Chemical Effluence" (studio track; outtake from the Code: Selfish sessions) | M. Smith | 6:29 |
| 15. | "Three Points" (spoken word by Smith played over the PA) | M. Smith | 0:48 |
| 16. | "Up Too Much" (actually "You’re Not Up to Much") | M. Smith, Scanlon, Hanley (Note: Credited to M. Smith and Hanley on album cover.) | 2:51 |

Note

- Tracks 15 and 16 are listed as one track but indexed as two on the disc.

== 2006 reissue ==
The album was reissued by Castle Music in May 2006 in a remastered edition but with no additional material. However, as the release was mastered from the original vinyl, the original CD-only bonus tracks "Three Points" and "Up Too Much" are missing from this new version, despite being listed on the sleeve.

== Personnel ==
Adapted from the album liner notes.

The Fall

- Mark E. Smith - vocals, tapes (etc)
- Simon Wolstencroft - drums
- Craig Scanlon - guitar
- Steve Hanley - bass guitar, backing vocals
- Karl Burns - drums, guitar, vocals
- Brix - guitar, bass guitar, vocals
- Julia Nagle - keyboards

Additional personnel

- Dave Bush - keyboards on "Big New Prinz", "Paranoid Man In Cheap Sh..t Room" and "Bounces - Leeds"
- Kenny Brady - fiddle on "Prague 91/Mr Pharmacist"
- Simon Rogers - machines on "Noel's Chemical Effluence"
- Robert Gordon - bass and keyboards on "Cloud of Black"
- Rex Sargeant - mix, compilation
- Andy Bernstein - sound on tracks 8–23
- Anthony Frost - art
- Claus Castenskiold - art
- Pascal Le Gras - art
- Lucy Rimmer - layout
- Valerie Philips - photography
- there is also an additional credit which appears to read Andy: Rime Time Studios, Ancoats, M/C
