= Free Range (song) =

Single by The Fall

from the album Code: Selfish
- B-side: "Everything Hurtz"
- Released: March 1992
- Genre: Alternative dance, post-punk
- Length: 4:21 (single version); 4:05 (album version)
- Label: Fontana Records / Cog Sinister
- Songwriter(s): Mark E. Smith, Simon Wolstencroft
- Producer(s): Mark E. Smith, Craig Leon, Simon Rogers

The Fall singles chronology
"High Tension Line" (1990)	"Free Range" (1992)	"Ed's Babe" (1992)

"Free Range" is a song by British post-punk band the Fall, written by vocalist Mark E. Smith with the band's drummer Simon Wolstencroft. It was released on the band's 1992 album Code: Selfish, and as a single, reaching number 40 on the UK singles chart and becoming the highest-charting single of any of the Fall's original songs. The single and album versions differ as the album version includes part of a different take.

Smith's lyrics string together images and streams of consciousness, and were described by Ted Mills at Allmusic as showing "prepsicognition" of the then-impending wars resulting in the break-up of Yugoslavia.

"Free Range" showcased the growing influence of techno and dance music on the band's sound, largely brought by new keyboardist Dave Bush. Bush said of about the recording: "We tried to record it loads of times but Mark wouldn't let me do it the way I wanted to do it. He wouldn't let us have the click track on and said we couldn't play with sequencers. In the end he said:'Right, I'm going to the fuckin' pub. You've got half an hour. If you don't get it fuckin' sorted out by then we're not doing that fuckin' song.' He went to the pub and we got it down in one go."
