= The Infotainment Scan =

Studio album by The Fall
- Released: 26 April 1993
- Studio: Suite 16, Rochdale
- Genres: Alternative rock; post-punk; alternative dance
- Length: 40:36 (LP and cassette); 50:08 (CD)
- Labels: Permanent; Matador
- Producers: Rex Sergeant; Simon Rogers; Mark E. Smith

The Fall chronology
Code: Selfish (1992)	The Infotainment Scan (1993)	Middle Class Revolt (1994)

The Infotainment Scan is the fifteenth album by the Fall, released in 1993 on Permanent Records in the UK and by Matador Records in the USA (the first of the band's albums to get an official American release since Extricate (1990)). At the time of its release, it was considered the band's most accessible album and came when the band were experiencing unprecedented recognition in the media. It entered the UK Albums Chart at number 9, making it their highest-charting album.

== Track information ==
The album features covers of the Sister Sledge disco track "Lost in Music" and of Steve Bent's "I'm Going to Spain", an obscure song that Bent had performed on the British talent show New Faces in 1976 (Bent's version was included on The World's Worst Record album, compiled by disc jockey Kenny Everett in 1978). The CD edition of The Infotainment Scan also includes "Why Are People Grudgeful?", the only track to be released as a single (albeit in a different version). It is based on two reggae songs: "People Grudgeful" by Joe Gibbs and "People Funny Boy" by Lee "Scratch" Perry.

Of the original compositions on The Infotainment Scan, "Glam-Racket" drew much attention for its alleged criticism of Britpop band Suede, with the lyric "you are entrenched in suede". Mark E. Smith denied that the lyric was a reference to the band and asserted that it was an attack on nostalgia. "The League of Bald-Headed Men", identified by Simon Reynolds as a "diatribe against gerontocracy", has a vaguely similar riff to Led Zeppelin's "Misty Mountain Hop", although Smith stated that he had never heard the band's music. A remix of "The League of Bald-Headed Men", retitled "League Moon Monkey Mix", is also included on the CD edition.

"Paranoia Man in Cheap Sh*t Room" adapts its title from "Nervous Man in a Four Dollar Room", an episode of The Twilight Zone. Smith had previously borrowed episode titles "What You Need" and "Time Enough at Last" (and would later use "Kick the Can").

== Reissues ==
The Infotainment Scan was reissued by Artful in 1999 with the same track listing as the original CD editions. It was remastered and expanded to a double-CD set by Castle Music in 2006 with slightly amended artwork. The first disc followed the original CD album track order, while the second added B-sides, demos, alternate versions and radio sessions.

== Critical reception ==
Professional ratings
Review scores
Source	Rating
AllMusic	4/5 stars
Entertainment Weekly	A−
Los Angeles Times	3/4 stars
Mojo	4/5 stars
NME	8/10
Q	4/5 stars
The Rolling Stone Album Guide	3.5/5 stars
Select	5/5
Spin Alternative Record Guide	8/10
Uncut	4/5 stars

The Infotainment Scan received generally positive reviews. AllMusic's Ned Raggett called it "a winner and a half" and "one of the band's most playful yet sharp-edged releases", picking out "Paranoia Man in Cheap Sh*t Room" as a highlight. Jim Sullivan for The Boston Globe called it "10 tracks of caustic wit set to backing music that swirls one moment and grinds the next". Robert Christgau gave it a three-star "honorable mention", with the comment "great original sound, one hell of a cover band". Ben Thompson, in The Independent, gave it a positive review, stating "Smith's invective has rarely been more sharply honed" and that the band "have rarely sounded brighter". Simon Reynolds, reviewing it for The New York Times, stated it "may be one of the Fall's more approachable records, but Mr. Smith's lyrics are as caustic as ever". Keith Cameron, reviewing for the NME, said the album "stands at the very peak of their canon". Chuck Eddy, for Spin, was less enthusiastic, saying Smith "used to seem smarter" and accusing him of repeating himself. Mark Jenkins of The Washington Post stated "the album continues the swaggeringly uncompromising and hopelessly unmarketable mix of Craig Scanlon's scratchy guitar, bassist Stephen Hanley and drummer Simon Wolstencroft's loping thump, and Smith's caustic and cryptic, cut-up and spit-out poetry."

The album was included in Robert Dimery's 2005 book 1001 Albums You Must Hear Before You Die.

== Track listing ==
No.	Title	Writer(s)	Length
1.	"Ladybird (Green Grass)"	Mark E. Smith, Craig Scanlon, Steve Hanley, Dave Bush, Simon Wolstencroft	3:59
2.	"Lost in Music"	Nile Rodgers, Bernard Edwards	3:49
3.	"Glam-Racket"	Smith, Scanlon, Hanley	3:12
4.	"I'm Going to Spain"	Steve Bent	3:27
5.	"It's a Curse"	Smith, Scanlon	5:19
6.	"Paranoia Man in Cheap Sh*t Room"	Smith, Scanlon	4:27
7.	"Service"	Smith, Scanlon, Hanley	4:11
8.	"The League of Bald-Headed Men"	Smith, Hanley	4:07
9.	"A Past Gone Mad"	Smith, Bush, Wolstencroft	4:19
10.	"Light/Fireworks"	Smith	3:46
Total length:			40:36

Additional tracks (CD only)
No.	Title	Writer(s)	Length
11.	"Why Are People Grudgeful?" (CDSPERM9 single, 1993)	Lee "Scratch" Perry, Joe Gibbs	4:33
12.	"League Moon Monkey Mix" (alternative version of "The League of Bald-Headed Men")	Hanley, Simon Rogers, Smith	4:36
Total length:			50:08

2006 Castle reissue bonus disc
No.	Title	Writer(s)	Length
1.	"Ladybird (Green Grass)" (Peel Session #16 – 13/3/93)		4:05
2.	"Strychnine" (Peel Session #16 – 13/3/93)	Gerry Roslie	2:54
3.	"Service" (Peel Session #16 – 13/3/93)		3:36
4.	"Paranoia Man in Cheap Sh*t Room" (Peel Session #16 – 13/3/93)		4:19
5.	"Glam-Racket" (Mark Goodier Session – 17/5/93)		3:34
6.	"War" (Mark Goodier Session – 17/5/93)	Peter Blegvad, Anthony Moore	2:36
7.	"15 Ways" (Mark Goodier Session – 17/5/93)	Smith, Scanlon, Hanley	2:51
8.	"A Past Gone Mad" (Mark Goodier Session – 17/5/93)		4:35
9.	"Why Are People Grudgeful?" (CDSPERM9 single mix)		4:28
10.	"Glam-Racket" (CDSPERM9 single mix)		3:33
11.	"The Re-Mixer" (CDSPERM9 single mix)	Smith, Scanlon	6:03
12.	"Lost in Music" (CDSPERM9 single mix)		3:50
13.	"A Past Gone Mad" (alternative version)		4:39
14.	"Instrumental outtake"	Scanlon, Hanley	3:46
15.	"Service" (instrumental demo)		4:40
16.	"Glam-Racket" (instrumental demo)		3:21
17.	"Lost in Music" (mix 3)		4:40
18.	"Lost in Music" (mix 7)		4:39
19.	"Lost in Music" (mix 14)		4:28
Total length:			76:37

== Personnel ==
The Fall

- Mark E. Smith – vocals, tapes, production (2, 10)
- Craig Scanlon – guitar
- Steve Hanley – bass guitar, backing vocals
- Simon Wolstencroft – drums, programming
- Dave Bush – keyboards, programming, backing vocals

Additional personnel

- Rex Sargeant – production (1, 4–9, 11)
- Simon Rogers – production (3, 12)
- Pascal Le Gras – cover art
