= 52nd Street (band) =

British jazz-funk band

- Origin: Manchester, England
- Genres: Jazz, funk, soul, R&B
- Years active: 1980–1991
- Labels: Factory Records (UK); A&M Records; Profile Records (US); Ten/Virgin Records; MCA Records (US)
- Past members: Diane Charlemagne; Tony Bowry; Tony Henry; Rose Williams; Eric Godden; Desmond Isaacs; Jennifer McCloud; Beverley McDonald; Tony Thompson; Derrick Johnson; John Dennison; Myke Wilson

52nd Street were a British jazz-funk and R&B band formed in Manchester in late 1980. Throughout the 1980s the group enjoyed success not only in the UK but also on the Billboard chart in the United States. Their biggest and best-known hit single was "Tell Me (How It Feels)", released in 1985 by the 10 Records subsidiary of Virgin Records in the UK, and then months later on in 1986 on MCA Records in the US.

== Overview ==
The original line-up consisted of Tony Henry (guitar), Derrick Johnson (bass), Desmond Isaacs (keyboards), drummer Tony Thompson (not to be confused with the Chic drummer of the same name), Jennifer McCloud (vocals). Vocalist Rose Williams and saxophonist Eric Godden both came and departed before John Dennison replaced Desmond Isaacs and Beverley McDonald replaced Jennifer McCloud, at which point the lineup stabili[z/s]ed.

The band played gigs around the Manchester scene, whilst at the same time recording demo tapes in local studios. Local funk DJ Mike Shaft became their mentor, playing 52nd Street demos on his Piccadilly Radio shows. In mid-1981, noted R&B/soul DJ Richard Searling and former Sad Café manager Derek Brandwood (both of RCA Records) brought the band into a local Manchester recording studio, Revolution Studios, to record the group's intended debut single. Meanwhile, simultaneously, the band also frequented Strawberry Studios to record tracks for Warner Bros. Records A&R scout and club promotions manager Erskine Thompson. With both major labels increasing the pressure to talk to the as-yet manager-less 52nd Street, bass player Derrick Johnson instead contacted Rob Gretton, co-owner of Factory Records and a former DJ (the connection was through Johnson's brother Donald, the drummer for Factory act A Certain Ratio). Gretton went to see the band play at jazz venue the Band on the Wall in Manchester. Soon after, Gretton and his business partner, Tony Wilson added the band to their roster.

=== Factory years ===
52nd Street's first release on Factory Records in 1982 was "Look into My Eyes," backed with "Express", produced by Donald Johnson. Journalist Paul Morley, then reviewing singles for the NME, made it his single of the week, but his approval did little to get daytime radio play or enhance sales.

"Cool as Ice" (backed with "Twice as Nice") was not released in the UK, although the song gained a top 30 Billboard Dance Chart position. A&M flew the band to the US to promote the release, playing live club dates mainly on the east side of the country, including two nights at the Danceteria in New York City. The success of "Cool as Ice" in 1983 led A&M (US) to demand a follow-up single to maintain momentum.

Meanwhile, in the UK, Wilson began to include the band on Factory's publicity material. They also appeared twice on his Granada Reports news programme.

Anxious to release more material, 52nd Street became restless and found themselves caught in a dilemma. While major labels including A&M (UK) were starting to show interest, certain band members felt loyal to the Factory organisation. Discussions followed that led to Wilson's ex-wife, Lindsay Reade, becoming their manager. She could make decisions on behalf of Factory Communications, upon approval from either Rob Gretton or Tony Wilson.

=== Lindsay Reade years ===
Reade had returned to Factory Records in 1984, to run the Overseas Licensing Department. Once manager, she put together a strategy to hasten productivity. After a short non-productive period, the band regrouped and reorganised. Vocalist Beverley McDonald departed and promptly began contributing to Quando Quango's LP Pigs and Battleships.

McDonald was replaced by Diane Charlemagne (later lead vocalist with Moby and would go on to bigger UK success with the Urban Cookie Collective).

New Order's Stephen Morris was called in to help out on production for 52nd Street's third single "Can't Afford". Morris also completed production on two other tracks that were supposed to appear on a later EP. Both those additional tracks, "Look I've Heard it all Before" and "Available", were re-recorded and released on the band's 1986 Virgin debut album titled Children of the Night.

Eleven months had passed since A&M US requested a follow-up single. They finally lost patience with the unprofessionalism of Factory Records. Reade, implementing what she thought was agreed company policies and procedures, mailed copies of the new single to A&M US. They rejected the track, thus leaving the band free to negotiate with other interested parties. Profile Records heard "Can't Afford" on constant rotation in New York night clubs and noted that A&M had declined to exercise the option. Reade, as Overseas Licensing Manager, negotiated with Profile Records who wanted to release the record as bootleg recordings were already beginning to surface.

=== Reade sacking ===
Reade's business dealings caused eruptions not just with Wilson and Gretton, but Michael Shamberg who ran Factory US. 52nd Street were caught in the middle and the band members' allegiance to Reade was beginning to fragment. In December 1984, a Factory Records management meeting took place at which Reade was sacked and told to leave the offices without the band.

"Can't Afford" was an even a bigger US success than "Cool as Ice," entering the top 20 on the Billboard Dance Chart in early 1985.

Loyalties within the band were being tested. Derrick Johnson was a Factory Records man. He not only played bass for 52nd Street, but was also session guitarist alongside his brother Barry Johnson (former bass player with Sweet Sensation) in Quando Quango. After deliberation and against the wishes of both Gretton and Wilson, 52nd Street followed Lindsay Reade and left Factory Records in January 1985. Derrick Johnson refused to follow and stayed with the organisation.

=== Children of the Night ===
The band went on to have success in the UK Singles Chart and US Billboard R&B Chart with several songs from their 1985 album Children of the Night. The album reached No. 23 on the Top R&B/Hip-Hop Albums chart and No. 71 in the UK Albums Chart. It was produced by Philadelphia-based Nick Martinelli, who was producing two other successful UK based acts Loose Ends and Five Star at the time. The biggest hit from the album was "Tell Me (How it Feels)" which, in the winter of 1985, reached No. 8 on the US Hot R&B/Hip-Hop Songs chart. It also reached No. 14 on the US Hot Dance Club Songs chart and No. 54 on the UK Singles Chart. The album spawned two other modest hits in the UK Singles Chart in early 1986 with "You're My Last Chance" (No. 49) and "I Can't Let You Go (No. 57).

=== Something's Going On ===
Their second and final album, Something's Going On, was released in 1987. It was not a commercial success, although "I'll Return" reached No. 79 on the US R&B Chart. The album and single failed to chart in the UK. One other single from the album was released, "Are You Receiving Me?". In 1988, the group, minus Dennison, released one last unsuccessful single as 52nd Street, "Say You Will".

In late 1987, Dennison co-wrote the dance hit single "Girls Can Jak Too" with his sister Susan (released under the name 'Zuzan'), produced by Mike Pickering.

=== Cool Down Zone ===
In 1990, Charlemagne and Bowry re-emerged under the name Cool Down Zone. They invited 52nd Street's live drummer Mike Wilson to join, and they released the album New Direction. They released two singles from the album; "Heaven Knows" and "Waiting For Love". "Heaven Knows" reached No. 52 on the UK Singles Chart and "Waiting For Love" No. 97. They released two more singles, "Lonely Hearts" in 1992 and "Essential Love" in 1993, before disbanding. Tony Henry went on to form FR'Mystery, releasing music on the imprint Gwarn Records between 1991 and 1994.

== Discography ==
=== Albums ===
Year	Album	Peak chart positions	
Year	Album	UK	US R&B
1985	Children of the Night	71	23
1987	Something's Going On	—	—

=== Singles ===
Year	Single	Peak chart positions		
Year	Single	US R&B	US Dance	UK
1982	"Look Into My Eyes"	—	—	—
1983	"Cool as Ice"	—	29	—
1983	"Twice as Nice"	—	29	—
1984	"Can't Afford"	—	16	—
1985	"Tell Me (How It Feels)"	8	14	54
1985	"You're My Last Chance"	67	—	49
1986	"Children of the Night"	—	—	—
1986	"I Can't Let You Go"	—	—	57
1987	"Are You Receiving Me?"	—	—	—
1987	"I'll Return"	79	—	—
1988	"Say You Will"	—	—	98
"—" denotes releases that did not chart or were not released.
