= Shift-Work (album) =

Studio album by The Fall
- Released: 15 April 1991
- Recorded: Late 1990-early 1991
- Studios: FON Studios, Sheffield and elsewhere
- Genres: Alternative rock; post-punk
- Length: 46:00 (LP); 51:54 (CD)
- Label: Fontana
- Producers: Craig Leon; Robert Gordon; Grant Showbiz

The Fall chronology
Extricate (1990)	Shift-Work (1991)	Code: Selfish (1992)

Professional ratings
Review scores
Source	Rating
AllMusic	2.5/5 stars
NME	10/10
Pitchfork	6.8/10

Shift-Work is the 13th album by English rock band the Fall, released through Phonogram Records in 1991. The Fall started working on the album in 1990 while touring in support of Extricate. Mark E. Smith sacked guitarist Martin Bramah and keyboardist Marcia Schofield immediately after the Australian leg of the tour, reducing the lineup to four for the first time in band's history. Only one song ("Rose") from the sessions with Bramah and Schofield eventually appeared on the album (non-vinyl versions also included the single "White Lightning", originally recorded by The Big Bopper). Several tracks were released as the Dredger EP in August 1990, including "Life Just Bounces", which would later be re-recorded for Cerebral Caustic. The Fall's first release with a reduced lineup was the single "High Tension Line" in December 1990.

Shift-Work marked, in the opinion of critic Ted Mills, a change in direction for the group, as "repetitious grooves became interspersed with pop song structures." Several songs have been noted as more introspective than previous Fall efforts. "Edinburgh Man" for example, in which lead singer Mark E. Smith longs to be in the city of Edinburgh, Scotland, has been described as "surprisingly malice-free" and, in one enthusiastic review, as the best Fall song ever.

The album reached number 17 in the UK charts, a two-place improvement on their previous best, The Frenz Experiment.

The album was re-released by Voiceprint in 2002, adding two additional tracks to the original 14 -rack CD: "Blood Outta Stone" and "Xmas With Simon". This incarnation was also made available in a double-CD set with Voiceprint's edition of Code: Selfish in 2003. It was reissued again in an expanded and remastered form by Universal on 7 May 2007.

== Track listing ==
=== Original UK LP ===
Side 1 – "Earth's Impossible Day"
No.	Title	Writer(s)	Producer(s)	Length
1.	"So What About It?"	Mark E. Smith, Craig Scanlon, Simon Wolstencroft	Robert Gordon	3:25
2.	"Idiot Joy Showland"	Smith, Steve Hanley	Craig Leon	3:43
3.	"Edinburgh Man"	Smith, Scanlon	Leon; Grant Showbiz	4:44
4.	"Pittsville Direkt"	Smith, Scanlon, Hanley	Showbiz	4:02
5.	"The Book of Lies"	Smith, Scanlon	Gordon	2:58
6.	"The War Against Intelligence"	Smith, Scanlon	Gordon	3:17

Side 2 – "Notebooks Out Plagiarists"
No.	Title	Writer(s)	Producer(s)	Length
7.	"Shift-Work"	Smith, Scanlon	Leon	4:38
8.	"You Haven't Found It Yet"	Smith, Scanlon	Leon	4:07
9.	"The Mixer"	Smith, Scanlon	Gordon	3:37
10.	"A Lot of Wind"	Smith	Leon; Showbiz	3:46
11.	"Rose"	Smith, Scanlon	Leon	3:20
12.	"Sinister Waltz"	Smith	Leon	4:13
Total length:				46:00

=== Original UK CD and cassette ===
No.	Title	Writer(s)	Producer(s)	Length
1.	"So What About It?"	Smith, Scanlon, Wolstencroft	Gordon	3:25
2.	"Idiot Joy Showland"	Smith, Hanley	Leon	3:43
3.	"Edinburgh Man"	Smith, Scanlon	Leon; Showbiz	4:44
4.	"Pittsville Direkt"	Smith, Scanlon, Hanley	Showbiz	4:02
5.	"The Book of Lies"	Smith, Scanlon	Gordon	2:58
6.	"High Tension Line"	Smith, Scanlon, Hanley	Showbiz; Smith	3:48
7.	"The War Against Intelligence"	Smith, Scanlon	Gordon	3:17
8.	"Shift-Work"	Smith, Scanlon	Leon	4:38
9.	"You Haven't Found It Yet"	Smith, Scanlon	Leon	4:07
10.	"The Mixer"	Smith, Scanlon	Gordon	3:37
11.	"White Lightning"	J.P. Richardson	Leon; Smith	2:14
12.	"A Lot of Wind"	Smith	Leon; Showbiz	3:46
13.	"Rose"	Smith, Scanlon	Leon	3:20
14.	"Sinister Waltz"	Smith	Leon	4:13
Total length:				51:54

2002 CD re-issue bonus tracks
No.	Title	Writer(s)	Producer(s)	Length
15.	"Blood Outta Stone"	Smith, Martin Beddington	Leon; Smith	3:33
16.	"Xmas with Simon"	Smith, Scanlon, Wolstencroft	Showbiz; Smith	3:29
Total length:				58:52

=== 2007 reissue ===
Disc One

- As per original UK vinyl

Disc Two

No.	Title	Writer(s)	Producer(s)	Length
1.	"White Lightning" ("White Lightning" single; The Dredger EP, 1990)	Richardson	Leon; Smith	2:14
2.	"Blood Outta Stone" ("White Lightning" single; The Dredger EP)	Smith, Beddington	Leon; Smith	3:34
3.	"Zagreb (Movements I+II+III)" ("White Lightning" single; The Dredger EP)	Smith, Marcia Schofield (I+II); Smith, Matt Black, Jon More (III)	Leon; Smith	5:55
4.	"Life Just Bounces" ("White Lightning" single; The Dredger EP)	Smith, Scanlon	Leon; Smith	4:13
5.	"The Funeral Mix" ("White Lightning" 12" single)	Smith, Black, More	Coldcut	3:31
6.	"High Tension Line" ("High Tension Line" single, 1990)	Smith, Scanlon, Hanley	Showbiz; Smith	3:47
7.	"Xmas with Simon" ("High Tension Line" single)	Smith, Scanlon, Wolstencroft	Showbiz; Smith	3:28
8.	"Don't Take the Pizza" ("High Tension Line" 12" single)	Smith, Simon Rogers	Showbiz; Smith	2:37
9.	"So What About It?" (remix 1) ("So What About It?" 12" promo single, 1991)	Smith, Scanlon, Wolstencroft	Gordon	4:23
10.	"So What About It?" (remix 2) ("So What About It?" 12" promo single)	Smith, Scanlon, Wolstencroft	Gordon	4:33
11.	"So What About It?" (remix 3) ("So What About It?" 12" promo single)	Smith, Scanlon, Wolstencroft	Gordon	4:11
12.	"The Re-Mixer" ("Why Are People Grudgeful?" single, 1993)	Smith, Scanlon	Gordon	4:08
13.	"Cloud of Black" (Shift-Work outtake; The Twenty-Seven Points, 1995)	Smith	Gordon	4:28
14.	"Arid Al's Dream" (Volume Four, 1992; Volume magazine compilation album)	Smith, Scanlon	Leon; Smith; Rogers	4:48
15.	"The War Against Intelligence" (Peel Session; recorded 5 March 1991)	Smith, Scanlon	Mike Robinson	3:03
16.	"Idiot Joy Showland" (Peel Session; recorded 5 March 1991)	Smith, Hanley	Robinson	3:47
17.	"A Lot of Wind" (Peel Session; recorded 5 March 1991)	Smith	Robinson	5:25
18.	"The Mixer" (Peel Session; recorded 5 March 1991)	Smith, Scanlon	Robinson	4:32
Total length:				74:00

== Miscellanea ==
The War Against Intelligence was the original title of the album until the outbreak of the Gulf War convinced Smith to change it to something less controversial. In October 2003, Universal released The War Against Intelligence – The Fontana Years, a collection of Fall songs from the albums Extricate, Shift-Work, Code: Selfish and related singles, even as the United Kingdom was involved in another Persian Gulf war.

== Personnel ==
The Fall

- Mark E. Smith – vocals
- Craig Scanlon – guitar
- Steve Hanley – bass guitar
- Simon Wolstencroft – drums, keyboards
- Kenny Brady – fiddle; co-lead vocal on "The Book of Lies"

Additional personnel

- Craig Leon – organ, guitar
- Cassell Webb – backing vocals
- Martin Bramah – guitar on "Rose", "White Lightning" (+ bonus tracks "Blood Outta Stone", "Zagreb" and "Life Just Bounces")
- Marcia Schofield – flute on "Rose", keyboards on "White Lightning" (+ bonus tracks "Blood Outta Stone", "Zagreb" and "Life Just Bounces")
- Dave Bush – electronics; keyboards on "Arid Al's Dream" (bonus track)
- Robert Gordon – synth bass and keyboards on "Cloud of Black" (bonus track)

Technical

- Craig Leon – production; mixing (tracks 2–4, 7, 8, 10–12)
- Robert Gordon – production
- Grant Showbiz – production
- Pascal Le Gras – cover art
