= Freaky Dancing =

At The Haçiendra Nightclub

- Editor: Paul Gill, Ste Pickford
- Categories: Fanzine, Madchester
- Frequency: Monthly
- Founded: 1989
- First issue: July 1989; 37 years ago
- Final issue Number: August 1990; 11
- Country: United Kingdom
- Based in: Manchester
- Language: English

Freaky Dancing was a fanzine produced for and about The Haçienda nightclub in Manchester during the rise of acid house and the Madchester music scene.

The fanzine was put together by Paul 'Fish Kid' Gill and Ste 'Ste*2' Pickford with contributions from friends and Hacienda regulars. It ran for 11 issues between July 1989 and August 1990. The first eight issues were given away for free to people queuing up outside the club on a Friday night. Subsequent issues were sold in shops and bars around Manchester and London.

Its subject matter has been described by Sarah Champion (journalist) "for and about kids in the queue for the Hacienda! Such editorial scope. Getting to, in and home from The Hac".

Describing the early distribution of the fanzine, co-owner of the Hacienda Tony Wilson wrote in his autobiography "Nobody complained about the queue. Which was why people loved it. Which was why a fanzine, Freaky Dancing, was written for the queue".

As the club became increasingly popular, Peter Hook of New Order added "Queues became even more lengthy; the distribution of the fanzine Freaky Dancing... did little to make this aspect of the experience seem more appealing."

The fanzine came to an end as the Madchester scene disintegrated into drug-fueled paranoia "People we're getting over the top. A lot of people became casualties. Freaky Dancing never came out again. It just died."

Freaky Dancing was a subject in the 1990 Granada TV documentary about the Madchester scene 'Celebration: Madchester - Sound of the North'.

A compilation of the fanzine was published by The Quietus in March 2019.

== Books ==
- Freaky Dancing: The Complete Collection The Quietus, 2019. ISBN 978-1725660892.
