= Graeme Park (DJ) =

- Born: Graeme George Park; 4 August 1963 (age 62); Aberdeen, Scotland
- Genres: House, soul, funk, disco
- Occupations: Disc jockey, radio presenter, record producer
- Years active: 1984–present
- Labels: Submission
- Website: www.thisisgraemepark.com

Graeme George Park (born 4 August 1963) is a British house music DJ and is widely credited as one of the original founders of the UK's rave/club scene, notably as a leading figure of The Haçienda club in Manchester, England.

== Beginnings ==
Park started out working in the Nottingham record shop, Select-a-Disc Records, from where his early forays into DJing were at The Garage Club (later The Kool Kat) in Nottingham, The Leadmill in Sheffield, and other clubs in the Midlands and North of England. It gained him an invite to join Mike Pickering (of M-People fame) at the decks of The Haçienda club in 1987, where he played until the venue closed in June 1997. Park and Pickering were credited with putting the club on the map with their successful club nights, notably hosting the visionary "Nude" night on Fridays.

His long career first began in the early 1984 playing acid house around numerous bars and clubs in Nottingham. Park was the runner-up to Danny Rampling in the inaugural Best DJ in the World Award by DJ Magazine in 1991.

== 24 Hour Party People ==
Park was a consultant on the film, 24 Hour Party People, and also appeared in it DJing on set alongside Steve Coogan who played the Factory Records boss Tony Wilson.

== DJ Magazine Awards ==
Artists are nominated to the DJ Magazine top 100 list for each year the public decides who they rank as the World's No. 1 DJ at the end of the poll. Park was the runner up in the inaugural award that ranked the World's No. 1 DJs in 1991.

Year	Nominee / work	Award	Result
1991	Graeme Park	World's Top 100 DJs	2nd place

== Discography ==
=== Albums ===
- 2000: Vol 3 House (CD, mixtape)
- 2016: Haçienda Classiçal

=== Singles and EPs ===
- 1989: "Karl Denver Meets Pickering and Park", Wimoweh

=== Mixed compilations ===
- 1992: Danny Rampling & Graeme Park - Mixmag Live! Vol. 4
- 1992: DJ Magazine Union City Recordings Megamix
- 1993: Graeme Park and Ellis Dee - Fantazia - Twice As Nice
- 1993: DJ Magazine - Liam Howlett / DJ Pogo / Graeme Park - The Heavyweight Selection
- 1994: No Repetitive Beats (Clause 58 Government Criminal Justice Bill)
- 1994: Liquid Grooves Vol. 1
- 1994: Graeme Park, LuvDup, Mike C - Fantazia Presents the House Collection Vol 1
- 1995: Graeme Park, Jeremy Healy - Up Yer Ronson Soundtrack
- 1995: Graeme Park, Pete Tong, Paul Oakenfold, Justin Robertson - Cream Live
- 1995: DJs at Work Volume 2
- 1995: Summer 1995 Live
- 1996: Graeme Park, Angel, Chris & James - National Anthems
- 1996: Eau De House Volume 1
- 1996: Graham Gold / Graeme Park - Kissmix 96
- 1997: The History of Mixmag Live 4
- 1998: Graeme Park / Jim "Shaft" Ryan - Too Glamorous
- 2002: We Love the Haçienda
- 2002: Bargrooves - On the House

=== Remixes ===
- 2018: Noel Gallagher's High Flying Birds - "It's a Beautiful World (Mike Pickering & Graeme Park Hacienda Mix)"
