= Lynn Venable (writer) =

American writer (1927–2025)

Marilyn "Lynn" Venable (June 3, 1927 – March 31, 2025) was an American writer.

== Early life ==
Lynn Venable was born on June 3, 1927, and was from New Jersey.

== Career ==
Venable's short story "Time Enough at Last" (If Magazine 1953) was adapted for television as an episode of The Twilight Zone in 1959, starring Burgess Meredith. The story is frequently anthologized and discussed by scholars, who note that it was published in the same year as Ray Bradbury's Fahrenheit 451 and includes similar themes about reading and books.

Other stories by Venable include "Homesick" (Galaxy Science Fiction Magazine 1952), "Punishment Fit the Crime" (Other Worlds 1953), "The Missing Room" (Weird Tales 1953), "Doppelganger" (Mystic Magazine 1954), "Parry's Paradox" (Authentic Science Fiction 1955), and "Grove of the Unborn" (Fantastic Universe 1957). "Someone once asked me, 'Why do you write these things? Why do you like to scare yourself?'" she told a reporter in 2012. "I said, 'I don't scare myself. I scare other people.'"

== Personal life and death ==
Venable married at 18 and moved to Dallas, Texas. By 1988 she had moved again to Walnut Creek, California.

In 2012, Venable was living in a retirement community in El Cerrito, California. She died on March 31, 2025, at the age of 97.
