= TG+ =

Box set by Throbbing Gristle
- Released: 26 January 2004
- Recorded: 1980–1981
- Genre: Industrial
- Label: Industrial

Throbbing Gristle chronology
TG24 (2002)	TG+ (2004)	TG Now (2004)

TG+ is a box set by Throbbing Gristle. The 10-CD set contains Throbbing Gristle live performances, all digitally remastered by Chris Carter. The set is a follow-up to TG24. These recordings represent the final ten live TG recordings that were not included in the TG24 release. Other than CDs, the set contains an inlay with five laser cut metal plates that are about the size of a business card. Each plate is a variation of the TG logo.

== CD information ==
1. IRCD30: Live at Oundle Public School, UK, 16 March 1980.
2. IRCD33: Live at Sheffield University, UK, 10 June 1980.
3. IRCD36: Live at SO36 Club, Berlin Germany, 7 November 1980.
4. IRCD37: Live at SO36 Club, Berlin Germany, 8 November 1980.
5. IRCD38: Live at Kunsthofschule, Frankfurt Germany, 10 November 1980.
6. IRCD39: Live at Rafters Club, Manchester, 4 December 1980.
7. IRCD40: Live at Heaven, London, 23 December 1980.
8. IRCD41: Live at Lyceum, London, 8 February 1981.
9. IRCD42: Live at Veterans Auditorium, Los Angeles USA, 22 May 1981.
10. IRCD43: Live at Kezar Pavilion, San Francisco USA, 29 May 1981.

== Cassette information ==
Release Cover	Release Information
	At Oundle Public School: Catalog number: IRC30; Date of performance: 16 March 1980; Audio: Binaural; Set list: An Old Man Smiled, Subhumans, Heathen Earth, Something Came Over Me, Don't Do What You're Told Do What You Think, Wall of Sound
	At Sheffield University: Catalog number: IRC33; Date of performance: 10 June 1980; Audio: Binaural Stereo; Set list: Heathen Earth, Strangers in the Night, We Said No, Flesh Eaters

== See also ==
- Throbbing Gristle live
