= Calico Printers' Association =

British textile company

The Calico Printers' Association Ltd was a British textile company founded in 1899, from the amalgamation of 46 textile printing companies and 13 textile merchants. The industry had prospered in the latter half of the 19th century but the fierce competition led to a decline in quality and profit margins. Most of the leading companies in the industry decided to amalgamate in order "to preserve the tradition and standing of calico printing and to produce textiles of a high standard at reasonable prices." The company at its inception accounted for over 80% of Britain’s output of printed cloth.

The Calico Printers' Association Limited was incorporated on 8 November 1899 with an issued share capital of £8,200,000, consisting of £5,000,000 share capital and £3,200,000 of debenture stock. Under the chairmanship of F. F. Grafton, the company established its first head office at 2 Charlotte Street, Manchester, before moving to more suitable premises at 56 Mosley Street. In 1912, a new head office, the magnificent St James's Buildings was completed on Oxford Street, Manchester.

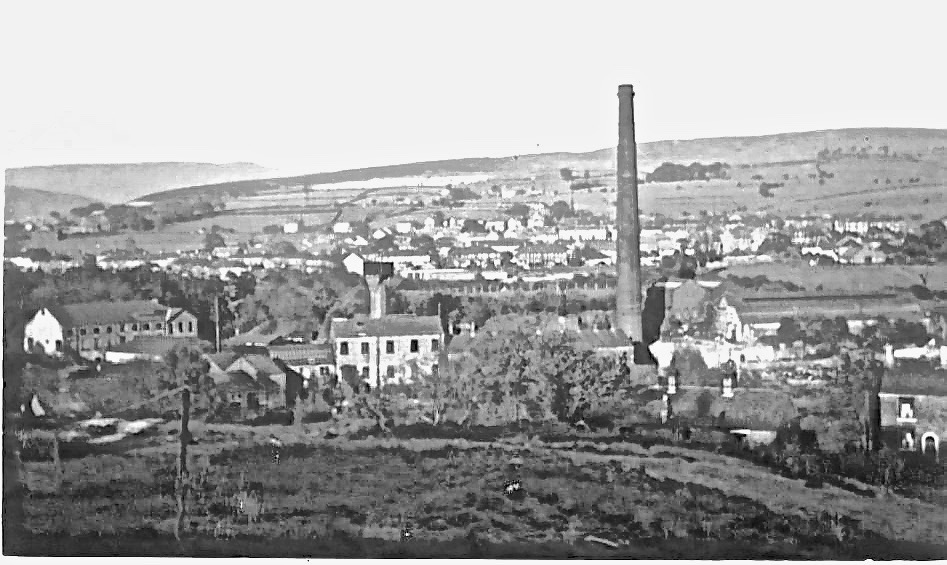
Watford CPA Print Works from Mellor Rd, New Mills in 1963

Companies involved in the merger included:

- F. W. Ashton & Co, Newton Bank Works, Hyde
- Bradshaw, Hammond & Co
- James Black & Co, Dalmonach Works, Bonhill
- Thornliebank Co Ltd
- John H. Gartside & Co
- F. W. Grafton & Co
- Hayfield Printing Company Ltd
- Hewit & Wingate Ltd
- Thomas Hoyle and Sons
- Edmund Potter & Co
- Rossendale Printing Company Ltd, Loveclough
- Salis Schwabe & Co
- Strines Printing Company Ltd
- Whalley Abbey Printing Company Ltd
- Allan Arthur, Fletcher & Co
- Bayley and Craven Ltd
- Bingswood Printing Company Ltd
- R. Dalglish, Falconer & Co
- Inglis & Wakefield Ltd
- A. R. Macgregor & Co

== Later history ==
In 1941, polyethylene terephthalate was discovered in the research laboratories of the Calico Printers' Association. The new polymer was later developed into the synthetic textile fibre Terylene by ICI.

During the second World War the Calico Printer's Association produced cloth insignia for the armed forces of the UK and other Commonwealth countries like Canada. This was an economical measure to replace melton wool normally used in military insignia production.

The Calico Printers' Association acquired the assets of the United Turkey Red Company Ltd in 1960.

In 1968, the Calico Printers' Association merged with the English Sewing Cotton Company to form English Calico Ltd, which changed its name to Tootal Ltd in 1973.
