= Mark Kamins =

American DJ (1955–2013

Mark Kamins (April 11, 1950 – February 14, 2013) was an American record producer, remixer, and disc jockey famous for his role in the New York club scene. He is best known for helping launch the career of singer Madonna by bringing her to Sire Records and producing her debut single "Everybody" in 1982.

== Life and career ==
Kamins attended Elizabeth Irwin High School in New York City. He grew up with songwriter Bob Thiele Jr. and they went to school with jazz drummer Denardo Coleman and photographer Amy Arbus.

As a teenager, Kamins worked at a record shop, Record Connection, where he met DJs and that led to his first DJing gig at the nightclub Le Jardin. After Kamins graduated from college in 1976, he went to London where his then-girlfriend worked at Virgin Megastore. At the shop, he met someone who offered him a job in Greece and he ended up DJing in Athens for a year at a club called Anabella's. When he returned to New York, he got a job at a rock club called Trax on 72nd Street and Columbus Avenue.

In 1979, Chris Blackwell, the founder of Island Records, heard Kamins DJing at Trax and hired him to do A&R for the label. Kamins signed The Waitresses and Was Not Was to Island Records.

When Jim Fouratt and Rudolf Pieper opened the first Danceteria nightclub in 1980, they hired Kamins as a DJ. When the club closed, he was hired by Steve Mass to DJ at the Mudd Club on White Street. He later returned to work at the second Danceteria on 21st Street.

Around this time, Kamins began remixing songs. His first remix was "Big Business" (1981) by David Byrne. He suggested the instrumental for "Pull Up to the Bumper" (1981) by Grace Jones. "That was a B-Side of a Junior Tucker song. It was just a Sly & Robbie dub track that was hanging around. I gave it to Grace to write some lyrics on it, and she came up with "Pull Up to the Bumper."

In 1982, Madonna, then an aspiring singer, gave Kamins the demo tape of her song "Everybody" at Danceteria. They became romantically involved and Kamins played her music for Blackwell, hoping to sign her. The Island Records chief said, "I'm not gonna sign my A&R guy's girlfriend." Kamins then sent the tape to Seymour Stein, head of Sire Records. Stein was impressed with the song and asked to meet Madonna while he was admitted to Lenox Hill Hospital, ultimately signing her to a singles deal. Kamins produced "Everybody", which was released as Madonna's debut single in October 1982.

Kamins remixed "A Nite Out" (1983) and "Peacetrain" (1984) by Urban Blight. In 1984, Kamins recorded the Beastie Boys. He produced the 1985 album Pigs and Battleships by Quando Quango. In 1985, Steve Rubell hired Kamins as DJ at the opening week of the Palladium nightclub, but his style didn't work well at the club and he was fired after the opening night.

Kamins opened his own venue, The Harem, where live Turkish musicians played along with his instrumental house tracks.

On February 14, 2013, Kamins died at the age of 57 after he suffered "a massive coronary" in Guadalajara, Mexico, where he had been teaching. He was survived by a son.
