= Rob Gretton =

British music promoter and manager (1953–1999)

- Born: 15 January 1953; Newall Green, Wythenshawe, Manchester, England
- Died: 15 May 1999 (aged 46)
- Genres: New wave, post-punk
- Occupations: Promoter, manager
- Years active: 1977–1999
- Label: Factory
- Formerly of: Joy Division, New Order

Robert Leo Gretton (15 January 1953 – 15 May 1999) was the manager of Joy Division and New Order. He was a partner in and co-director of Factory Records and a founding partner of The Haçienda. For ten years until his death in 1999, Gretton ran his own label, Rob's Records.

== Life and career ==
In 1977, Gretton became a leading figure in the Manchester punk scene with his involvement with Slaughter & the Dogs. He was a DJ in Rafters club and manager of The Panik.

Gretton's involvement with the Manchester scene began when he contributed £200 to co-finance Slaughter & the Dogs' first single, the punk classic "Cranked Up Really High".

In 1978, Gretton saw Joy Division perform at the Stiff Test/Chiswick Challenge battle of the bands in Manchester City centre. The next day, he accosted Bernard Sumner in a phone box and insisted he be the band's manager. Tony Wilson of newly formed Factory Records also saw Joy Division, and perhaps Gretton, for the first time that night. He then went on to write to Wilson twice, once asking to appear on Wilson's regional music show, and again to thank him for mentioning Joy Division on the show. Wilson replied, telling Gretton that "Joy Division (were) the best thing I've heard in Manchester for about six months".

After joining Factory Records in 1979, Gretton brought many new bands to the label, including Section 25, X-O-Dus, Crispy Ambulance, Stockholm Monsters, Minny Pops, The Names, Quando Quango, The Wake, 52nd Street and Happy Mondays.

Gretton was proprietor of the Rob's Records label and a co-founder of The Haçienda nightclub in Manchester. In 1995, he founded Manchester Records.

He was a supporter of Manchester City F.C.

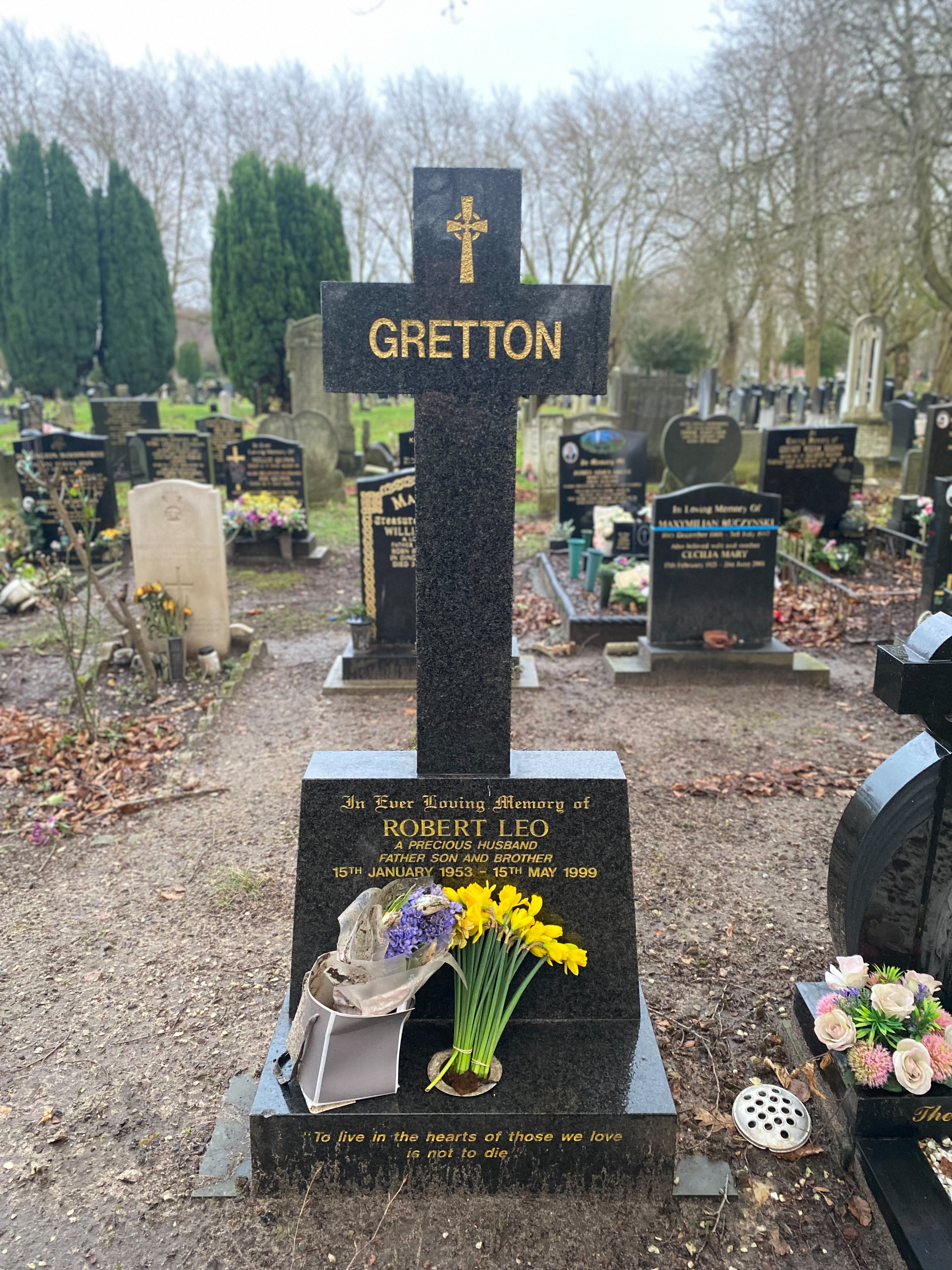
Rob Gretton's grave in Southern Cemetery, Manchester

Peter Hook recalls in his memoirs, Unknown Pleasures: Inside Joy Division and Substance: Inside New Order how Gretton would sometimes record backing vocals on New Order tracks and often helped with deliberations over song and album titles with both Joy Division and New Order.

He died in May 1999 at the age of 46 as the result of a heart attack.

== Portrayal in the media ==
Gretton was portrayed by Paddy Considine in the 2002 film 24 Hour Party People, which dramatised the rise and fall of Factory Records, and by Toby Kebbell in the 2007 film Control, a biopic of Joy Division singer Ian Curtis.
