= Quando Quango =

1980s British band

- Origin: Manchester, England; Rotterdam, Netherlands
- Genres: New wave, alternative dance, electronic
- Years active: 1981–1986
- Labels: Factory; LTM; Factory Benelux
- Members: Mike Pickering (Vocals); Hillegonda Rietveld (Programming); Simon Topping (Percussion); Barry Johnson (Bass)

Quando Quango were a British electronic music group, formed by The Haçienda DJ and Factory Records A&R man Mike Pickering, Hillegonda Rietveld (Gonnie) and Reinier Rietveld. Their unique sound influenced the underground dance music scenes in New York and Chicago in the 1980s. Their first release was the "Go Exciting" twelve-inch single on Factory Records in 1982, and their last release of new music was the 1985 full-length album Pigs + Battleships (reissued on CD by LTM Recordings in 2003 and 2013).

== Music ==
Quando Quango remain best known for the dance singles "Love Tempo," which reached number four on the US Billboard Dance Chart, and "Atom Rock." Their sound was the result of an eclectic mix of Latin music, jazz, reggae and disco, all in a pioneering new wave context. Hillegonda Rietveld said, describing the group's music, "...Fela Kuti meets Kraftwerk somewhere between Manchester and Rotterdam, part of a new wave of post-punk electronica, with a whole lot of Mike Pickering's admirably broad knowledge of soul music, disco music, reggae and pop to stuff the gaps". Bernard Sumner of Joy Division and New Order, who with Donald Johnson of A Certain Ratio produced early Quando Quango recordings, was a major influence on the group.

== History ==
The group was formed in Rotterdam, the Netherlands in 1980, by the Mancunian Mike Pickering and Rotterdam-based Gonnie Rietveld, supported on drums by her brother Reinier Rietveld. In 1982 they moved to Manchester, England, where Pickering's friend Rob Gretton was setting up The Haçienda nightclub.

In 1983, Reinier Rietveld left the group to concentrate on his band Spasmodique. Soon after, former A Certain Ratio singer/trumpeter/percussionist Simon Topping joined as percussionist. Gonnie Rietveld settled into her role programming their electronic music, and Pickering continued to write lyrics and melodies.

The same year, Derek Johnson of fellow Factory act 52nd Street joined on bass, soon to be replaced by his brother Barry Johnson, formerly of Sweet Sensation, and later of Aswad.

After releasing a few singles that were minor dance club hits, the group collaborated with Johnny Marr and Vini Reilly to create the full-length album Pigs + Battleships. Andy Connell of A Certain Ratio and Beverley McDonald of 52nd Street also contributed.

The group did not last long after the album's release, but before their collapse they recorded more material with prominent guests. Lisa Stansfield sang on demos of "Bad Blood" and "Vision of America" in 1986. Stephen Morris contributed percussion to "What Price Beauty," which later became the M People track "Kiss It Better."

After the group's demise, Pickering went on to form dance duo T-Coy with Topping and, later, M People. Rietveld's connection with The Haçienda continued when she researched and co-edited the book The Haçienda Must Be Built!, edited by Jon Savage. After gaining her doctorate (supervised by Steve Redhead), Dr Rietveld wrote a monograph on house music cultures This Is Our House: House Music, Cultural Spaces and Technologies, and is currently Professor of Sonic Culture at London South Bank University, where she initiated the study of music and sound design in 2004, and supervises postgraduate research projects in related topics.

== Discography ==
The discography of Quando Quango consists of one studio album and six singles.

=== Albums ===
- Pigs + Battleships (1985) Factory Records FAC 110 (UK Indie No. 17)

=== Singles ===
- "Go Exciting" (1982) Factory Records FAC 67

Tracks: "Go Exciting" / "Tingle"

- "Love Tempo" (1983) Factory Records FAC 79T (UK Indie No. 32)

Tracks: "Love Tempo" / "Love Tempo" (remix)

- "Atom Rock" (1984) Factory Records FAC 102T (UK Indie No. 42)

Tracks: "Atom Rock" / "Triangle"

- "Genius" (1985) Factory Records FAC 137 (UK Indie No. 38)

Tracks: "Genius" / "Rock"

- "Bad Blood" Factory Records FAC 156 (Not released due to breakup)
- "Love Tempo" (2004) LTM Recordings LTMS 12-2370

Tracks: "Love Tempo (Mark Kamins Mix)" / "Genius" / "Atom Rock (Dub)"
