= Jon Dasilva =

British DJ & producer (born 1963)

- Born: August 30, 1963 (age 63); Preston, Lancashire, England
- Genres: Acid house, house music, techno
- Occupations: DJ, Record producer
- Years active: 1988–present

Jon Dasilva is a British DJ and producer. As a former resident of Manchester club, The Haçienda, he is a figure in the early UK house scene.

== Hacienda residency and DJ career ==
After graduating in Film and History from the University of Kent, Jon moved to Manchester. He was soon offered a residency at the Manchester club, Fac 51 The Hacienda. Dasilva and DJ Mike Pickering started Ibiza-inspired HOT nights, which were the birthplace of UK acid house, alongside Danny Rampling's Shoom.

During his residency at The Hacienda, he became known for his use of a cappella vocals and sound effects. Such techniques influenced a new generation of young DJs, including Sasha, who credits Dasilva for teaching him how to mix harmonically and build sets.

Since leaving The Hacienda, Dasilva's career has taken him around the world. He was the first guest DJ to be booked by Slam (Soma Records) in Glasgow back in 1989, first UK DJ to play Tresor in Berlin around 1990. He was also one of the first British DJs to play China in the mid-90s, and was resident on the first Strictly Rhythm Records Tour alongside Todd Terry and a young Roger Sanchez. Since 2015 he has been one of the resident DJs at 'I Love Acid', currently the longest running dedicated, regular Acid House club night in the UK (established 2007) and winner of DJ Mag's Best Club Event 2019 award.

== Production ==
Jon has remixed for bands such as; New Fast Automatic Daffodils, New Order, A Certain Ratio, Inspiral Carpets and M People, and has released productions on labels including Ellum Audio, Rush Hour, Soma, Mute, Deconstruction, Better Days, Eskimo, DMC and many others.

Some release highlights include "Soul On Ice" featuring Rowetta from the Happy Mondays on vocals, "Hot" by Ideal, Jon's most successful solo project to date and Jon's blistering remix of Screen IIs, "Hey Mr. DJ", on Cleveland City Records. Jon was signed to Cleveland City for some years.

In 2013, Jon collaborated with Maceo Plex to produce "Love Somebody Else" which won "Best House Track" that year at the International Dance Awards in Miami. He is currently finishing a second album with his band The Virgo Mechanically Replayed, alongside a solo E.P. and collaborations with Josef K and Posthuman.
