= TG24 =

Box set by Throbbing Gristle
- Released: 2002
- Recorded: 1976–1980
- Genre: Industrial
- Label: Industrial

Throbbing Gristle chronology
CD1 (1986)	TG24 (2002)	TG+ (2004)

TG24 is a box set by industrial music pioneers Throbbing Gristle.

== Cassette set ==
TG24 was originally released as a cassette boxed set in 1980. The set contained the first of Throbbing Gristle's 24 shows in addition to two C90 cassettes taken from a Throbbing Gristle radio interview. The set was presented in a small attache case with a personalised handmade collage and various autographed pictures.

== CD set ==
The box set originally was planned to be released with 24 CDs, however orders from Mute.com included an extra CD. The set contains a total of 26 Throbbing Gristle live performances (IRCD03 has two shows on it). The follow-up boxset, TG+ contains an additional 10 live performances.

Box set includes the following items: certificate of authenticity, wax sealed envelope, two patches, three stickers, four pictures of Throbbing Gristle, four collage prints (1 of 2 made by each member of the band specifically for this release), three button badges and a newsletter with a history of the group and the track listing of the box set.

== CD information ==
Dates given in Year-Month-Day format.

1. IRCD02: 1976-10-18 – UK-London – I.C.A. [this includes a hidden track, with parts of radio about 'Prostitution' with Genesis P. Orridge, probably from JJJ Radio, Sydney, interviewer: Bruce Elder, 1978]
2. IRCD03:
  - 1. 1976-07-06 – UK-England-London – Air Gallery
  - 2. 1976-08-21 – UK-England-Winchester – Hat Fair
3. IRCD04: 1977-02-11 – Nags Head – High Wycombe
4. IRCD05: 1977-03-26 – Brighton Polytechnic
5. IRCD06: 1977-05-07 – Southampton – Nuffield Theatre
6. IRCD07: 1977-05-22 – UK-London – Rat Club, Pindar
7. IRCD08: 1977-09-29 – UK-London – Highbury Roundhouse
8. IRCD09: 1977-11-11 – Winchester Art School
9. IRCD10: 1977-12-17 – UK-London – Rat Club, Pinda
10. IRCD11: 1978-02-25 – Brighton Polytechnic
11. IRCD12: 1978-03-03 – UK-London – Architectural Association
12. IRCD13: 1978-05-18 – UK-London – Goldsmiths College
13. IRCD14: 1978-07-01 – Wakefield – Industrial Training College
14. IRCD15: 1978-07-06 – UK-London – London Film-Makers' Co-op
15. IRCD16: 1978-12-11 – UK-London – Cryptic One Club
16. IRCD17: 1979-01-21 – UK-London – Centro Iberico
17. IRCD18: 1979-04-12 – Derby – Ajanta Cinema
18. IRCD19: 1979-04-25 – Sheffield University
19. IRCD20: 1979-05-19 – Manchester – The Factory
20. IRCD21: 1979-05-26 – Northampton – Guild Hall
21. IRCD22: 1979-08-03 – UK-London – Y.M.C.A.
22. IRCD24: 1979-12-23 – UK-London – Butlers Wharf
23. IRCD25: 1980-02-24 – Leeds – Fan Club
24. IRCD26: 1980-02-29 – UK-London – Scala Cinema (this CD was only included with orders from Mute.com)
25. IRCD29: 1980-03-13 – Goldsmiths College

== Cassette information ==
=== Live ===
Release	Catalog number	Date of performance	Audio	Set list
At the ICA	IRC2	18 October 1976	Stereo	Inc. Very Friendly, We Hate You, Slugbait, Dead Ed, Zyklon B Zombie.
At the Air Gallery/Winchester	IRC3	6 July 1976/21 August 1976	Mono	Dead Ed, Very Friendly
At the Nag's Head, High Wycombe	IRC4	11 February 1977	Stereo	We Hate You, Very Friendly/Slugbait, Zyklon B Zombie
At the Brighton Polytechnic	IRC5	26 March 1977	Mono	Zyklon B Zombie, Last Exit, Maggot Life, Mary Jane, Record Contract, One Note, One Life, One Purpose
At Nuffield Theatre, Southampton	IRC6	7 May 1977	Stereo	Industrial Introduction, National Afront
At the Rat Club	IRC7	22 May 1977	Stereo	Tesco Disco, Fuck Off Cunt, One Pound Thirty Pence Wolverhampton, Goldilocks and the Three Fingers
At the Highbury Roundhouse	IRC8	29 September 1977	Stereo	Hit by a Rock, Blood on the Floor, You Me Here
At the Art School Winchester	IRC9	11 November 1977	Binaural Stereo	Dead Head
At the Rat Club	IRC10	17 December 1977	Stereo	White Christmas, Tesco Disco, Knife in My Side, Urge to Kill, Assume Power Focus, Wall of Sound
At the Brighton Polytechnic	IRC11	28 February 1978	Binaural Stereo	E-Coli, Anthony, Why does Carol eat Brown Bread?, He's My Friend, Wall of Sound
At The Architectural Association	IRC12	3 March 1978	Binaural Stereo	Dead Ed, Wall of Sound
At Goldsmiths College	IRC13	18 May 1978	Stereo	IBM, It's Always the Way, Hamburger Lady, Dead on Arrival, Wall of Sound
At The Industrial Training College	IRC14	1 July 1978	Stereo	IBM, Family Death, Cabaret Voltaire, Industrial Muzak, Hamburger Lady, Slugbait, Mother Spunk, Five Knuckle Shuffle, Whorle of Sound
At the London Film Makers Co-Op	IRC15	6 July 1978	Stereo	IBM, new After Cease to Exist Soundtrack, Hamburger Lady, Mother Spunk, Five Knuckle Shuffle
At the Crypt Club	IRC16	11 November 1978	Stereo	Whistling Song, Tesco Disco, E-Coli, High Note
At Centro Iberico	IRC17	21 January 1979	Stereo	Persuasion, Day Song, Five Knuckle Shuffle, Wall of Sound
At Ajanta Cinema	IRC18	12 April 1979	Stereo	Weapon Training, Eee Ahh Oooh, Convincing People, Chat Up, Hamburger Lady, Day Song, Persuasion, Five Knuckle Shuffle
At Now Society	IRC19	25 April 1979	Stereo	Weapon Training, Convincing People, Hamburger Lady, Chat Up, Day Song, Persuastion, Five Knuckle Shuffle
At the Factory	IRC20	18 May 1979	Stereo	Weapon Training, See You Are, Convincing People, Hamburger Lady, His Arm Was Her Leg, What a Day, Persuasion, Five Knuckle Shuffle
At Guild Hall	IRC21	26 May 1979	Binaural Stereo	Wall of Sound, No Bones, Ice Cool Down, They Make No Say, Hamburger Lady, Day Song, Saw Mill
At the Y.M.C.A.	IRC22	3 August 1979	Binaural Stereo	Convincing People, Hamburger Lady, Still Walking, Persuasion, Day Song, Five Knuckle Shuffle, Wall of Sound
At Butlers Wharf	IRC24	23 December 1979	Binaural Stereo	Gloria Leonard, Six Six Sixties, An Old Man Smiled, Anal Sex, Chariot and Galley
At Leeds Fan Club	IRC25	24 February 1980	Binaural Stereo	Six Six Sixties, Subhuman, The World is a War Film, Something Came Over Me, Don't Do What You're Told Do What You Think
At Scala Cinema	IRC26	29 February 1980	Binaural	An Old Man Smiled, Subhuman, The World is a War Film, Something Came Over Me, Don't Do What You're Told Do What You Think
At Goldsmiths College	IRC29	13 March 1980	Side A is Binaural Stereo, Side B is Stereo	An Old Man Smiled, Russ, Subhumans, Heathen Earth, World is a War Film, Don't Do What You're Told Do What You Think

=== Other ===
Release	Catalog number	Audio	Content
Cassette A	IRCA	Binaural Stereo	TG radio interview
Cassette B	IRCB	Binaural Stereo	TG radio interview

== 1 Hour Sample ==
Previous to the release of the TG24 boxset, a sampler titled TG24 1 Hour Sample was released for promotion. The CD was available via Mute Records carrying the dual catalogue number: IRCD--/PTG60CD. The CD was compiled by Olivier Cormier Otano and edited on Pro Tools by Anne Carruthers.

Release Cover	Release Information
	1 Hour Sample: Catalog number: PTG 60 CD; Track listing: 1. Nags Head Intro/Persuasion/Fed Up/Something Came Over Me/Dead Ed – 30:03; 2. An Old Man Smiled/What A Day/Hamburger Lady/(electro instrumental)/(What A Day intro)/We Hate You Little Girls/Dead Ed – 29:56

== See also ==
- Throbbing Gristle live
