= I, Ludicrous =

English pop music group

I, Ludicrous is an English pop music trio, formed in February 1985, by John Procter (born 1957) and David Rippingale ("Will Hung") (b. 1956). Their debut flexi release ("Preposterous Tales") reached Number 11 in John Peel's Festive Fifty in 1987.

In January 2008, Martin Brett from Voice of the Beehive joined the band on bass guitar.

I, Ludicrous released their most recent album in 2017 and play occasional live dates, primarily in London. The band have not appeared live since playing The Prince Albert, Brighton in July 2017.

== Discography ==
=== Albums ===
- It's Like Everything Else (Kaleidoscope Sound) (1987)
- Too Ludicrous (unreleased) (1988)
- A Warning to the Curious (Rodney Rodney!) (1989)
- Light And Bitter (Rodney Rodney!) (1990)
- Idiots Savants (Old King Lud) (1992)
- The Museum of Installation (Old King Lud) (2003)
- 20 Years In Show Business (Sanctuary / Rough Trade) (April 2007)
- Dull Is The New Interesting (Cherry Red/Old King Lud) (August 2015)
- Songs From The Sides Of Lorries (Cherry Red/Old King Lud) (September 2017)

=== Official bootlegs (CDRs) ===
- Deadpan Alley ("It's Like Everything Else" + "A Warning to the Curious")
- Following On (A compilation album of mostly previously unreleased material)

=== Singles ===
- "Preposterous Tales" (7" flexi given away free with Blah, Blah, Blah magazine) (1987)
- "Quite Extraordinary" (Kaleidoscope Sound) (1988)
- "Preposterous Tales" (Rodney Rodney!) (1990)
- "We Stand Around" (Roman Carbage) (1992)
- "Hats Off to Eldorado" (Old King Lud) (1993)
- "Man's Man" (Old King Lud) (1997)
- "Approaching 40" (Old King Lud) (2000)
- "Dirty Washing" (5 track EP, Old King Lud LUD006) (February 2008)
- "George Jenkins" (Cherry Red) (20 November 2015)
