= The Weeds (band) =

- Origin: Manchester, England
- Genres: Indie pop
- Years active: 1986
- Label: In Tape
- Past members: Simon Wolstencroft; Andrew Berry; Nick Arrojo; Carrie Lawson

The Weeds were a short-lived indie pop band formed in Manchester, England in 1986 who were "fronted by Andrew Berry...'China Doll' was their debut single and they had split up before it had even been released".

The band featured Simon Wolstencroft; latterly of The Fall and The Stone Roses, Andrew Berry - a close friend of Johnny Marr and Morrissey, Nick Arrojo and Carrie Lawson - one time girlfriend of early Fall drummer Karl Burns.

Berry and Wolstencroft formed the band in 1986 and played several gigs around Manchester (including supporting Happy Mondays at FAC 151 - The Festival of The Tenth Summer) at the start of the year before recording and releasing their only single "China Doll" on Marc Riley's In Tape label; however, before the single was actually released Wolstencroft was recruited by Mark E Smith to join The Fall following a successful support slot.

Berry and Arrojo were employed at various times as hairdressers at The Haçienda club in Manchester.
