= Kevin Cummins (photographer) =

British photographer

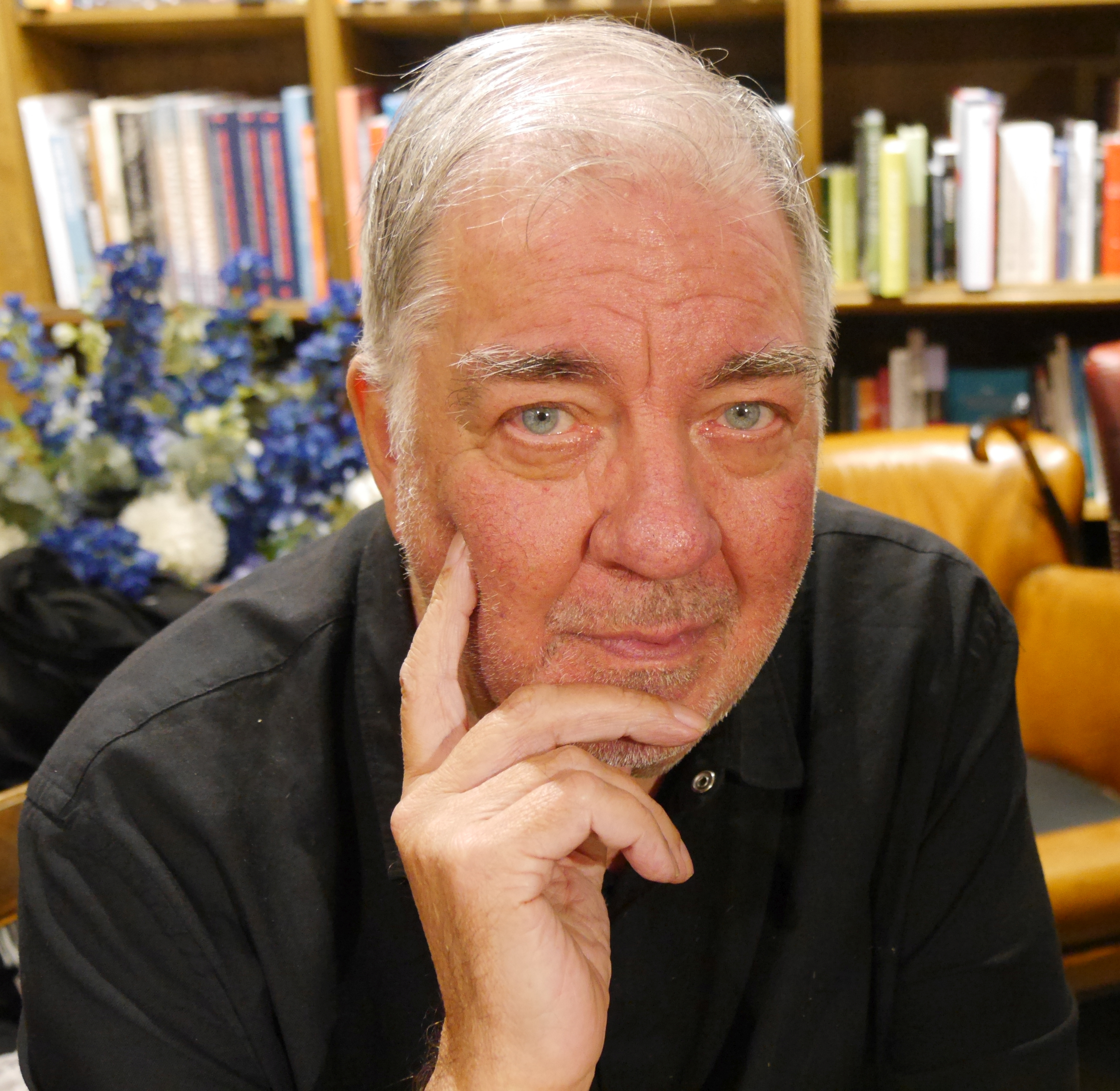
- Cummins, Hatchards, London, 2023
- Born: 1953 (age 72–73); Manchester, England
- Known for: Photography
- Website: kevincummins.co.uk

Kevin Cummins (born 1953) is a British photographer known for his work with rock bands and musicians. His work is held in the collections of the National Portrait Gallery and the Victoria and Albert Museum, London.

== Career ==
Cummins studied photography at Salford College. He started photographing rock bands in the mid-1970s in Manchester. Cummins had a 25-year association with the NME, including 10 years as their chief photographer. He has photographed numerous bands and musicians. His images have been seen as a contributing factor in the rise of the Madchester and Cool Britannia scenes.

Cummins was instrumental in establishing City Life, Manchester's what's on guide and was a founding contributor to The Face, the style magazine where he won an award for Magazine Cover of the Year.

Cummins's photographs have been used extensively in cinema and TV documentaries, including Grant Gee's Joy Division and John Dower's Live Forever: The Rise and Fall of Brit Pop.

He worked extensively for the Royal Exchange Theatre in Manchester when it opened in the late 1970s through the mid-1980s. He shoots regularly for the National Theatre in London, most recently for Harper Regan and Mrs. Affleck.

A lifelong Manchester City F.C. supporter, Cummins documented City's final season at Maine Road in the book We're Not Really Here.

In 2005, British pop artist Peter Blake produced a screen print based on one of Cummins' Joy Division prints.

== Publications ==
- The Smiths and Beyond (2002)
- We're Not Really Here: Manchester City's Final Season at Maine Road
- Juvenes (2007). Edition of 226 copies.
  - Joy Division: Juvenes. Cassell, 2021. ISBN 978-1788402712.
- Manchester: Looking For the Light Through the Pouring Rain
- Joy Division (Rizzoli, 2010)
- New Order (Rizzoli, 2015)
- Assassinated Beauty: Photographs of the Manic St Preachers. London: Faber & Faber, 2014. ISBN 978-0571312139.
- Telling Stories: Photographs of The Fall. London: Mitchell Beazley, 2022. With a foreword by Simon Armitage. ISBN 978-1784728250.

== Exhibitions ==
=== Solo exhibitions ===
- 1981 Stage Struck, Royal Exchange, Manchester
- 1983 Access all Areas, Royal Exchange, Manchester
- 1985 Silent Faces, Oldham City Art Gallery
- 1986 Cummins 10, Cornerhouse, Manchester (part of the Festival of the Tenth Summer)
- 1986–96 The Way We Were, Wigan Heritage Centre
- 1994 Salfordians, Salford City Art Gallery
- 2002 The Smiths and Beyond, Proud Central, London
- 2003 We're Not Really Here, Richard Goodall Gallery, Manchester
- 2006 Arca: Joy Division, Paul Stolper Gallery, London
- 2009 The Crucial 30: Post Punk Liverpool, The Hard Day's Night Hotel Gallery, Liverpool
- 2012: Exemplar: Joy Division, Manchester Photographic Gallery, Manchester
- 2014: New Order, Manchester Photographic Gallery, Manchester

=== Group exhibitions ===
- 1999 Icons of Pop, National Portrait Gallery, London, included three of Cummins' photographs

== Awards and honours ==
In November 2009, Cummins was awarded an Outstanding Contribution to Music Photography award by the music industry website: Record of the Day.

In 2015 Cummins was awarded an Honorary Doctorate (Arts) by Manchester Metropolitan University.

== Collections ==
Cummins' work is held in the following permanent collections:

- National Portrait Gallery, London: 4 prints (as of 12 October 2022)
- Victoria and Albert Museum, London: 7 prints (as of 12 October 2022)
