= St James Buildings, Manchester =

Listed building in Manchester, England

St James Buildings
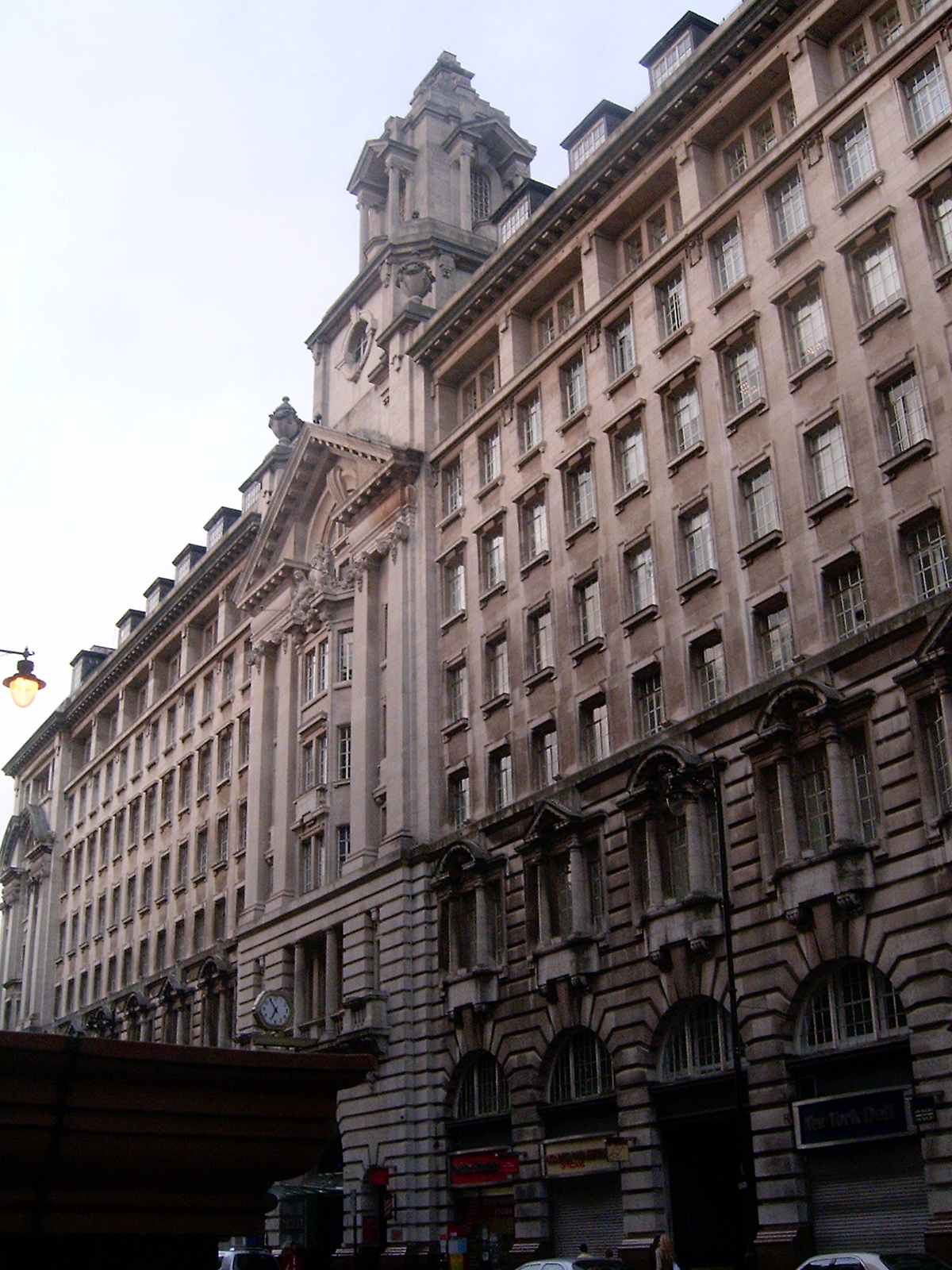

General information
- Status: Completed
- Type: Office
- Architectural style: Edwardian Baroque
- Address: 61–95 Oxford Street, Manchester, Greater Manchester, M1 6EJ
- Coordinates: 53.4755°N 2.2416°W
- Opened: 1912
- Client: Calico Printers' Association Ltd
- Owner: Bruntwood
- Height: 60 metres (200 ft)

Technical details
- Floor count: 9

Design and construction
- Architect(s): Clegg, Fryer & Penman
- Designations

Listed Building – Grade II
- Official name: St James Buildings
- Designated: 20 June 1988
- Reference no.: 1246571

Website
- Official website

St James Buildings is a high-rise, Grade II listed building on Oxford Street, in Manchester, England, completed in 1912. The building was constructed in the Edwardian Baroque style and has a Portland stone exterior reaching a maximum height of 60 metres (200 ft).

== History ==
The building opened in 1912 as the headquarters of the Calico Printers' Association Ltd, a company formed in 1899 from the amalgamation of 46 textile printing companies and 13 textile merchants. Companies involved in the merger included F. W. Grafton & Co, Edmund Potter & Co, Hoyle's Prints Ltd, John Gartside & Co, F. W. Ashton & Co, Rossendale Printing Company, Hewit & Wingate Ltd, and the Thornliebank Company Ltd.

The renovated building is leased to other businesses by its owner Bruntwood. As of February 2025, notable lessees include Kaplan Financial Ltd, BPP Law School, the Medical Practitioners Tribunal Service and the Manchester city centre campus for Edge Hill University, mainly for their paramedic and operating department practitioner courses.

== Architecture ==
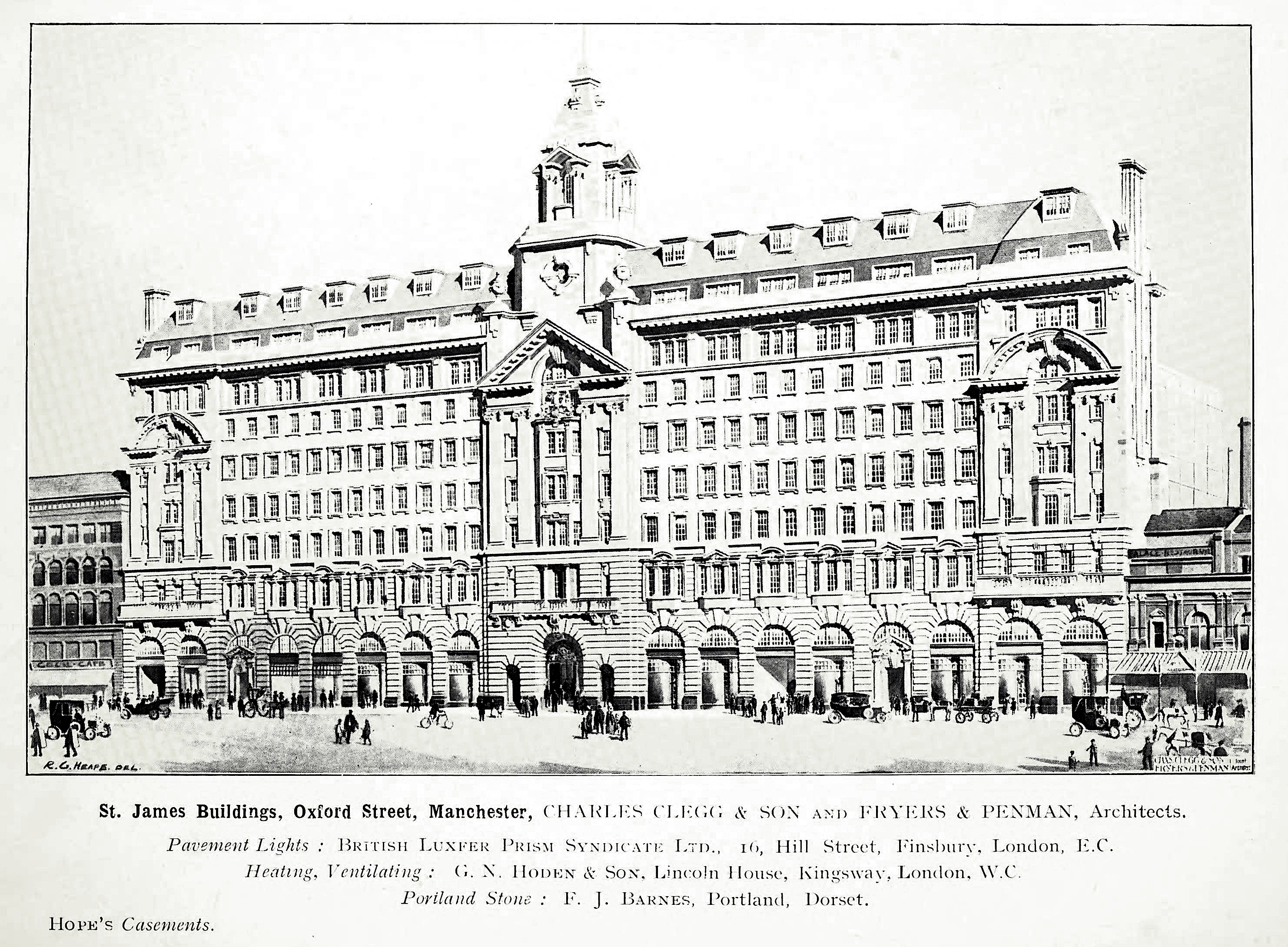
Drawing published in 1913.

The building is Edwardian Baroque in style, has a Portland stone exterior and reaches a maximum height of 60 metres (200 ft). The architects Clegg, Fryer & Penman designed the long façade with three slightly protruding pavilions with grossly inflated pilasters and pediments; in the centre the principal pediment is topped by a stumpy tower which breaks through the cornice line. The lowest third of the façade is emphasised by rustication and by having a more elaborate arrangement of windows.

== See also ==
- Listed buildings in Manchester-M1
- Tootal, Broadhurst and Lee Building, which faces the St. James Buildings across Oxford Street
