= Simon Wolstencroft =

English drummer (born 1963)

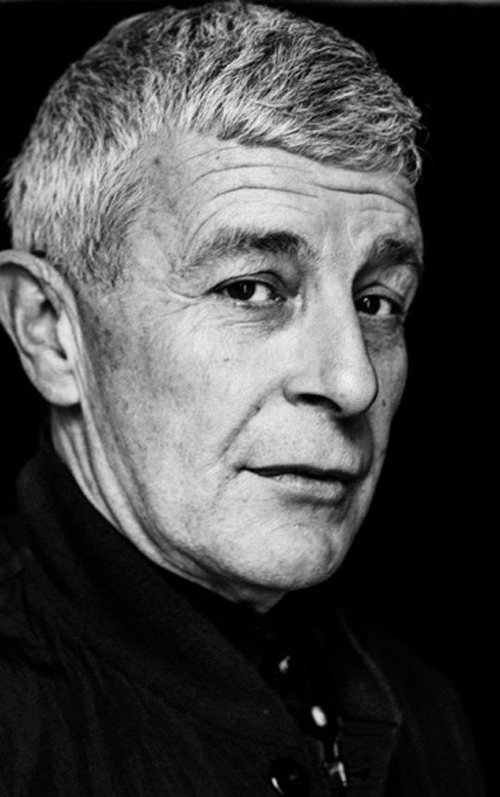
- Wolstencroft in 2014

Background information
- Also known as: Funky Si
- Born: Simon John Wolstencroft; 19 January 1963 (age 63); Altrincham, Cheshire, England
- Genres: Indie rock, post-punk
- Occupation: Musician
- Instrument: Drums
- Years active: 1979–present
- Formerly of: The Fall; The Patrol; Freak Party; The Smiths; The Stone Roses; The Colourfield; The Weeds; The Family Bizarre; Big Unit; Stemz; I-Monster; I, Ludicrous; The G-O-D
- Website: https://youcandrum.wordpress.com/

Simon John Wolstencroft (born 19 January 1963) is an English rock drummer best known for playing with the Fall from 1986 to 1997. He also played with early incarnations of the Smiths and the Stone Roses. His highly praised autobiography You Can Drum But You Can't Hide was published in 2014.

== The Stone Roses ==
Wolstencroft was a member of the Patrol, an early incarnation of the Stone Roses, with childhood friends Ian Brown and John Squire. He was also the drummer for Freak Party, which featured Johnny Marr and Andy Rourke. In Songs That Saved Your Life, Marr states that Wolstencroft declined to join the then-upcoming the Smiths as he did not like Morrissey's voice. In his subsequent memoir Set The Boy Free, Marr states that Morrissey was reluctant to take on drummer Mike Joyce as he was still hankering after having Wolstencroft in the band. Wolstencroft returned briefly to play with Ian Brown and John Squire in the nascent Stone Roses before taking a short-lived stint with Terry Hall's band the Colourfield.

== The Fall ==
In 1985, Wolstencroft formed the Weeds with friend Andrew Berry, who released the single "China Doll" on the In Tape label. Wolstencroft reveals in his memoir that when the Weeds played support to the Fall at Harlesden Mean Fiddler, a blazing row between Mark E. Smith and Fall drummer Karl Burns led to Smith offering Wolstencroft the stool in the Fall.

Wolstencroft joined the Fall in time to play on most of the group's Bend Sinister album (on which he was credited as "John' S. Woolstencroft") and remained in the band for over a decade, occasionally adding keyboards and programming to his role as well as co-writing the group's only self-penned Top 40 single, "Free Range", from their Code: Selfish album. He left the band following a dispute over the recording of the Levitate album.

== Later career ==
In 1996, Wolstencroft had a daughter, Emily Wolstencroft. After this, he went on to reunite with Stone Roses singer Ian Brown, performing and co-writing on his Golden Greats album in 1999. He toured with Sheffield-based electronica outfit, I-Monster, followed by a stint with Jez Kerr of A Certain Ratio in the Family Bizarre before joining ex 808 State player Darren Partington's band, Big Unit. Wolstencroft made a guest appearance on drums for I, Ludicrous at the Polyfest festival and recorded an album playing drums for One Manc Banned.

In 2016, Wolstencroft recorded a session for Neville Staple on the "Take Out The War" track with Juliette Ashby and worked with producer Mike Bennett on Stemz and a reworking of some early Freak Party recordings which incorporated Angie Brown on vocals and Craig Gannon on additional guitar. In the same year, he made his acting debut in a video for the Tim Burgess & Peter Gordon song "Say" directed by Wolstencroft's nephew, Nico Mirallegro.

Wolstencroft started a new band, the G-O-D, with long-time friend Chris Bridgett (Dub Sex) in 2015. They released an EP, Grafters Ov Denton, in 2017. Wolstencroft joined House of All in January 2023 along with ex-Fall members Martin Bramah, Steve and Paul Hanley, and Pete Greenway. It was announced they would release an eponymously named album in May 2023.

== You Can Drum But You Can't Hide ==
Wolstencroft's memoir You Can Drum But You Can't Hide was published by Strata Books in 2014, and an updated edition was published in 2017 by Route Publishing. The book is a comprehensive overview of his career in which he reveals a 30-year drug habit which he managed to keep secret from most of his colleagues and friends. He talked about the book at the 2014 and 2016 Louder Than Words literary festival and said that inspiration for writing his memoir came when a contestant on Mastermind correctly identified him as the original drummer of the Smiths.

== Discography ==
=== With the Fall ===
==== Studio albums ====
- 1986 Bend Sinister
- 1988 The Frenz Experiment
- 1988 I Am Kurious, Oranj
- 1990 Extricate
- 1991 Shift-Work
- 1992 Code: Selfish
- 1993 The Infotainment Scan
- 1994 Middle Class Revolt
- 1995 Cerebral Caustic
- 1996 The Light User Syndrome
- 1997 Levitate

==== Live albums ====
- 1993 BBC Radio One Live in Concert
- 1997 In the City
- 1997 15 Ways to Leave Your Man, Live
- 1998 Live Various Years
- 1998 Nottingham 92
- 2000 I Am as Pure as Oranj
- 2000 Live in Cambridge 1988
- 2003 The Idiot Joy Show
- 2003 Live at the Phoenix Festival

==== Part studio, part live albums ====
- 1989 Seminal Live
- 1995 The Twenty Seven Points

==== Compilation albums ====
- 1990 458489 A Sides
- 1990 458489 B Sides
- 1993 The Collection
- 1994 Backdrop
- 1998 Smile – It's The Best of the Fall
- 1999 The Peel Sessions
- 2003 Rebellious Jukebox
- 2004 50,000 Fall Fans Can't Be Wrong – 39 Golden Greats
- 2005 The Complete Peel Sessions 1978-2004
- 2007 The Fall Box Set – 1976–2007

==== EPs ====
- 1990 The Dredger EP
- 1993 Kimble

==== Singles ====
- 1986 "Living Too Late"
- 1986 "Mr. Pharmacist"
- 1986 "Hey! Luciani"
- 1987 "There's a Ghost in My House"
- 1987 "Hit the North"
- 1988 "Victoria"
- 1988 "Jerusalem"
- 1989 "Cab It Up!"
- 1990 "Telephone Thing"
- 1990 "Popcorn Double Feature"
- 1990 "White Lightning"
- 1990 "High Tension Line"
- 1992 "Free Range"
- 1992 "Ed's Babe"
- 1993 "Why Are People Grudgeful?"
- 1993 "Behind the Counter"
- 1994 "15 Ways"
- 1996 "The Chiselers"

=== With Ian Brown ===
==== Studio album ====
- 1999 Golden Greats
