= Time Enough at Last =

- The Twilight Zone episode
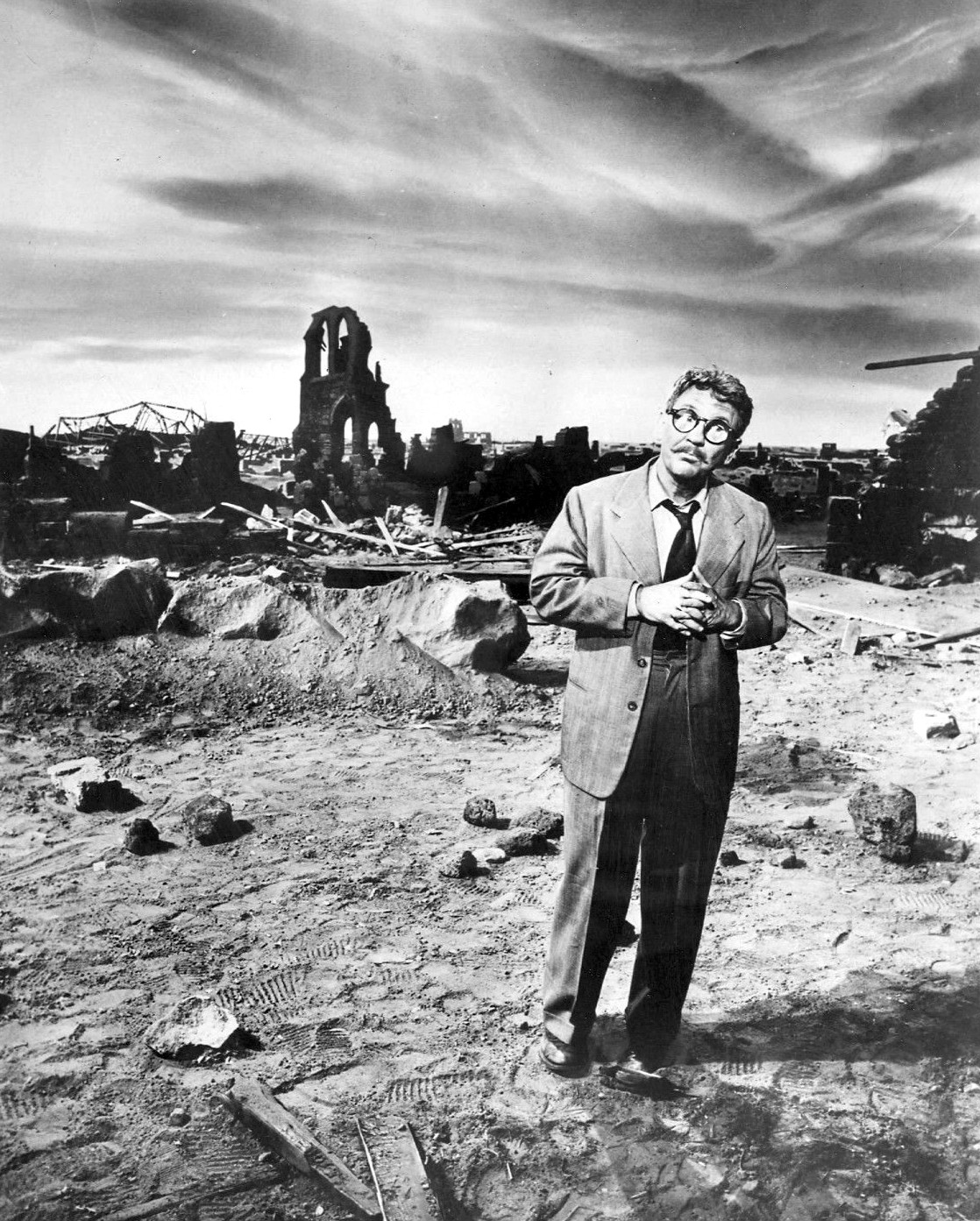
- Episode no.: Season 1 Episode 8
- Directed by: John Brahm
- Teleplay by: Rod Serling
- Based on: "Time Enough at Last" by Lynn Venable
- Production code: 173-3614
- Original air date: November 20, 1959

Guest appearances
- Burgess Meredith as Henry Bemis; Jacqueline deWit as Helen Bemis; Vaughn Taylor as Carsville

Episode chronology
← Previous "The Lonely"	Next → "Perchance to Dream"
- The Twilight Zone (1959 TV series, season 1)

"Time Enough at Last" is the eighth episode of the American anthology series The Twilight Zone, first airing on November 20, 1959. The episode was adapted from a short story by Lynn Venable, which appeared in the January 1953 edition of If: Worlds of Science Fiction.

"Time Enough at Last" became one of the most famous episodes of the original Twilight Zone. It tells "the story of a man who seeks salvation in the rubble of a ruined world". The man in question is Henry Bemis (/ˈbiːmɪs/), played by Burgess Meredith, who loves books but is surrounded by those who would prevent him from reading them. The episode follows Bemis through a post-apocalyptic world, touching on such social issues as anti-intellectualism, the dangers of reliance upon technology, and the distinction between solitude and loneliness.

== Opening narration ==
Witness Mr. Henry Bemis, a charter member in the fraternity of dreamers. A bookish little man whose passion is the printed page but who is conspired against by a bank president and a wife and a world full of tongue-cluckers and the unrelenting hands of a clock. But in just a moment, Mr. Bemis will enter a world without bank presidents or wives or clocks or anything else. He'll have a world all to himself - without anyone.

== Plot ==
Bank teller and avid bookworm Henry Bemis reads David Copperfield while serving a customer. He is so engrossed in the novel that he attempts to regale the increasingly annoyed woman with information about the characters and shortchanges her. Bemis' angry boss, and later his nagging wife, both complain to him that he wastes far too much time reading "doggerel". Back at home as a cruel joke, his wife asks him to read poetry to her from one of his books; he eagerly obliges, only to find that she has crossed out the text on every page. Seconds later, she destroys the book by ripping the pages from it.

The next day, as usual, Bemis takes his lunch break in the bank's vault, where his reading cannot be disturbed. Moments after he sees a newspaper headline, which reads "H-Bomb Capable of Total Destruction", an enormous explosion outside shakes the vault, knocking Bemis unconscious. After regaining consciousness and recovering his thick glasses, Bemis emerges from the vault to find the bank demolished and everyone in it dead. Leaving the bank, he sees that the entire city has been destroyed and realizes that though nuclear war has devastated Earth, his being in the vault has saved him. Rod Serling introduces an additional narration, a rarity for The Twilight Zone.

Seconds, minutes, hours, they crawl by on hands and knees for Mr. Henry Bemis, who looks for a spark in the ashes of a dead world. A telephone connected to nothingness, a neighborhood bar, a movie, a baseball diamond, a hardware store, the mailbox that was once his house and now is rubble; they lie at his feet as battered monuments to what was but is no more... Mr. Henry Bemis, on an eight hour tour of a graveyard.

Over eight hours, Bemis looks around the destroyed neighborhood for signs of life. Finding himself alone in the broken world with enough canned food to last him a lifetime and no means of leaving to look for other survivors, Bemis succumbs to despair. As he prepares to kill himself using a revolver he has found, Bemis sees the ruins of a public library in the distance. Investigating, he finds that the books are still intact; all the books he could ever hope for are his for the reading, and all the time he could ever hope for, to read them without interruption.

His despair gone, Bemis contentedly sorts the books he looks forward to reading for years to come, with no obligations to get in the way. Just as he bends down to pick up a book, he stumbles, and his glasses fall off and shatter. In shock, he picks up the broken remains of his glasses and breaks down in tears, surrounded by books he now can never read.

== Closing narration ==
The best-laid plans of mice and men - and Henry Bemis, the small man in the glasses who wanted nothing but time. Henry Bemis, now just a part of a smashed landscape, just a piece of the rubble, just a fragment of what man has deeded to himself. Mr. Henry Bemis - in the Twilight Zone.

== Production ==
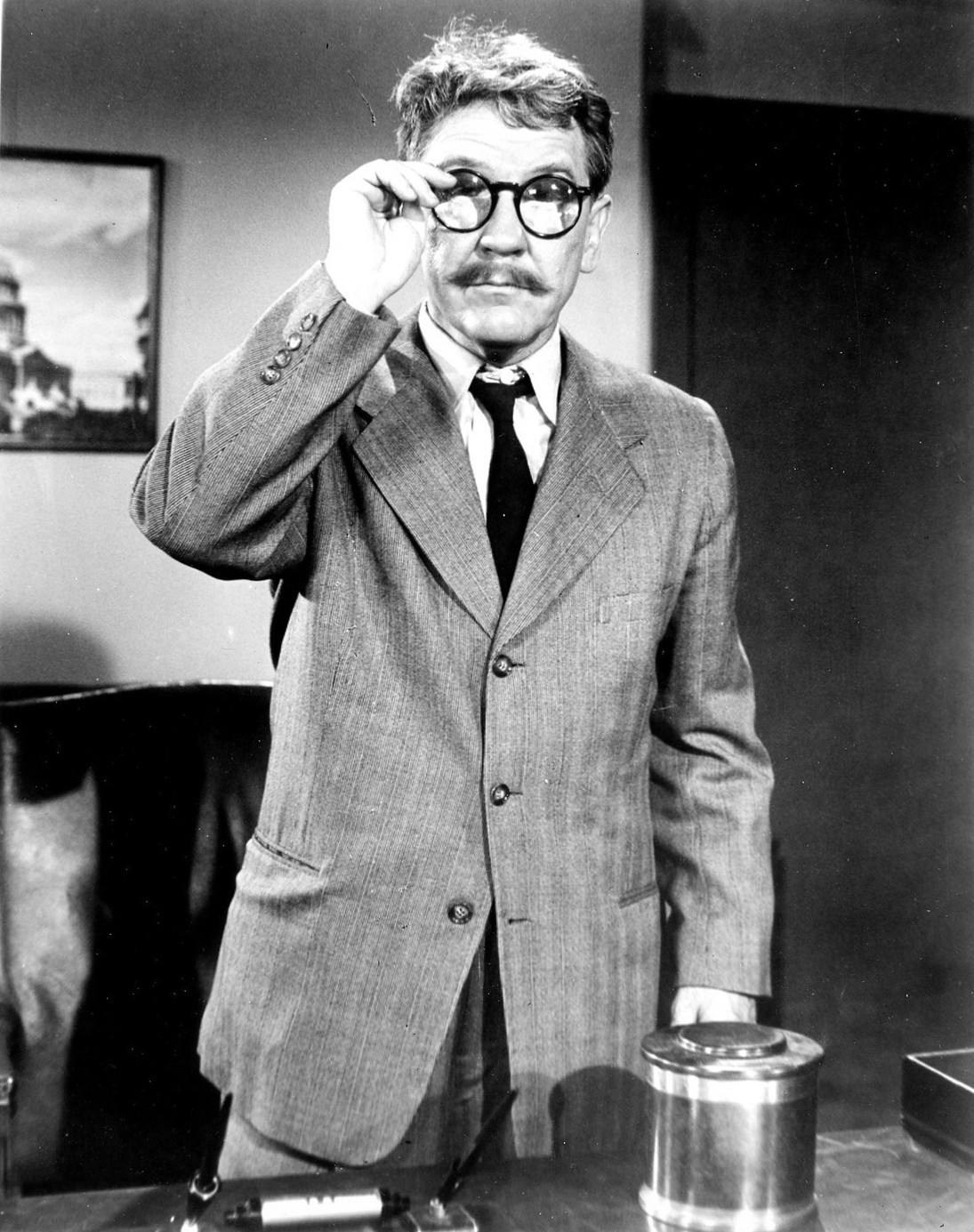
Burgess Meredith as Henry Bemis

"Time Enough at Last" was one of the first episodes written for The Twilight Zone. It introduced Burgess Meredith to the series; he went on to star in three more episodes, being introduced as "no stranger to The Twilight Zone" in promotional spots for season two's "The Obsolete Man". He also narrated the 1983 film Twilight Zone: The Movie, which made reference to "Time Enough at Last" during its opening sequence, with the characters discussing the episode in detail.

Footage of the exterior steps of the library was filmed several months after production had been completed. These steps also appear on the exterior of an Eloi public building in MGM's film of The Time Machine (1960). John Brahm was honored by the Directors Guild of America for his work on the episode. The book that Bemis was reading in the vault and that flips open when the bomb explodes is A History of the Life and Voyages of Christopher Columbus by Washington Irving.

== Themes ==
Although the overriding message may seem to "be careful what you wish for, you just might get it", there are other themes throughout the episode. Among these is the question of solitude versus loneliness, as embodied by Bemis' moment of near-suicide. Additionally, the portrayal of societal attitudes toward books speaks to the contemporary decline of traditional literature and how, given enough time, reading may become a relic of the past. At the same time, the ending "punishes Bemis for his antisocial behavior, and his greatest desire is thwarted".

Rod Serling's concluding statement in the episode alludes to Robert Burns' Scots language poem "To a Mouse". The poem concludes: "The best-laid schemes o' mice an men / Gang aft agley" (translation: "Often go awry"). Meredith himself had portrayed George Milton in the 1939 film adaptation of the Steinbeck novella named for that same line.

Although "Time Enough at Last" implies that nuclear warfare has destroyed humanity, film critic Andrew Sarris notes that the episode's necessarily unrealistic format may have been what allowed its production to commence:

Much of the implacable seriousness of The Twilight Zone is seemingly keyed by the clipped, dour delivery of Serling himself and the interlocutor. He never encourages us to laugh, or even smile, even when the plot twist is at least darkly funny. For example, in "Time Enough at Last" ... The H-bomb is still lurking in the background of the bookworm's "accident." The point is that the bomb could never have gone off on network television were the plot couched in a more realistic format.

In the era of the Internet and eBooks, the irony depicted in "Time Enough at Last" has an Information Age counterpart, according to Weston Ochse of Storytellers Unplugged. As Ochse points out, when Bemis becomes the last person on Earth, he finally has time to read, with all his books at his fingertips and the only impediment is technology when his medium for accessing them—his glasses—breaks. In a hypothetical world where all books are published electronically, Ochse observes, readers would be "only a lightning strike, a faulty switch, a sleepy workman or a natural disaster away from becoming Henry Bemis at the end of the world"—that is, a power outage has the potential to give them time to read, yet like Bemis, they too would lose their medium for accessing their books—namely the computer.

=== Similar episodes ===
The Twilight Zone often explored similar themes throughout its run. "Time Enough at Last" has strong thematic ties to a number of other episodes in the series, starting with that of isolation, first explored in the series pilot, "Where Is Everybody?" It is also a prominent theme in the previous episode, "The Lonely". Additionally, in a plot very similar to that of "Time Enough at Last", "The Mind and the Matter" tells of a man who uses his mind to erase humanity, only to find that existence without other people is unbearable. The notion of being an outsider, lost in a sea of conformity, was another common theme of the series.

Other thematic elements in this episode appear throughout the series as well. "The Obsolete Man" takes the episode's literary subtext—the notion that reading may eventually be considered "obsolete"—to an extreme: The state has declared books obsolete and a librarian (also played by Meredith) finds himself on trial for his own obsolescence. This notion, akin to Ray Bradbury's short story "The Pedestrian" (1951), is also alluded to in the episode "Number 12 Looks Just Like You", in which a perfect and equal world considers works like those of Shakespeare "smut".

== Impact ==
=== Critical reception ===
"Time Enough at Last" was a ratings success in its initial airing and "became an instant classic". It "remains one of the best-remembered and best-loved episodes of The Twilight Zone" according to Marc Zicree, author of The Twilight Zone Companion, as well as one of the most frequently parodied. When a poll asked readers of Twilight Zone Magazine which episode of the series they remembered the most, "Time Enough at Last" was the most frequent response, with "To Serve Man" coming in a distant second. In TV Land's presentation of TV Guide's "100 Most Memorable Moments in Television", "Time Enough at Last" was ranked at No. 25. In an interview, Serling cited "Time Enough at Last" as one of his two favorites from the entire series (the other was "The Invaders", with Agnes Moorehead).

=== In popular culture ===
The episode has been referenced many times in popular culture. For example, The Twilight Zone Tower of Terror, a theme park ride at Disney's Hollywood Studios and formerly Disney California Adventure Park, displays a replica of Henry Bemis' broken glasses in the lobby. Though Bemis's spectacles are reading glasses, Burgess Meredith wears them throughout the entire episode to make Bemis look more bookish. On one appearance of the TV show Futurama's show-within-a-show "The Scary Door", a parody of The Twilight Zone and The Outer Limits, a man like Bemis is presented in a library as "the last man on earth". After he loses his glasses, the show pokes fun at the fact that he can still read books with large print and even in braille, so he successively loses various body parts until the scene ends. The PC game Fallout Tactics (2001) includes a librarian in a desolate world who wants the player to find his missing glasses so he can read his books. The TV show Family Guy parodied the ending in a gag about Peter's last brain cell.
