= Crimson Tonight =

EP by the Stone Roses
- Released: January 1996
- Recorded: August 1995
- Venue: Féile Festival, Ireland
- Genre: Indie rock
- Length: 24:10
- Label: Geffen

Crimson Tonight is a live EP by English rock band the Stone Roses, released with special editions of their album Second Coming. Crimson Tonight was initially only released in Australia and Japan.

The EP was recorded live at Féile Festival, Ireland in August 1995.

== Cover artwork ==
The cover was, as with all other Roses covers, a piece by John Squire, based upon graffiti seen in the city of Dublin.

== Track listing ==
All songs were written by John Squire, except where noted.

Australian CD (Geffen GEFDM 22081)
Japanese CD (Geffen/MCA Victor MVCG-13029)

1. "Daybreak" (Ian Brown, Gary Mounfield, Squire, Alan Wren) – 8:38
2. "Breaking into Heaven" – 7:03
3. "Driving South" – 4:50
4. "Tightrope" – 4:39

== Personnel ==
- Ian Brown – vocals, percussion
- John Squire – guitar
- Mani – bass guitar
- Robbie Maddix – drums
- Nigel Ipinson – keyboards, backing vocals
