= Ten Storey Love Song =

1995 single by the Stone Roses

Single by the Stone Roses

from the album Second Coming
- B-side: "Moses"; "Ride On"
- Released: 27 February 1995
- Length: 4:28
- Label: Geffen
- Songwriter: John Squire
- Producers: Simon Dawson, Paul Schroeder, John Leckie

The Stone Roses singles chronology
| "Love Spreads" (1994) | "Ten Storey Love Song" (1995) | "Begging You" (1995) |

"Ten Storey Love Song" is a song by English rock band the Stone Roses, released as the second single from their album, Second Coming (1994), on 27 February 1995. It was written by guitarist John Squire. The song reached number 11 on the UK Singles Chart and spent three weeks on the chart. The B-sides, "Moses" and "Ride On", were the last new songs released by the group until "All for One" was released in 2016.

== Music video ==
A music video, directed by Sophie Muller, accompanied the single but the video was shot without the drummer, Reni, who did not turn up. An unidentified man wearing a mask of his face appears several times. Ian Brown did not turn up for the first day of the video shoot, reflected in the video when John Squire and Mani are watching footage of Ian Brown and Reni on a TV screen and look at their watches.

== Track listings ==
7-inch vinyl and cassette (GFS 87; GFSC 87)

1. "Ten Storey Love Song" (LP version) - 4:34
2. "Ride On" - 5:46

12-inch vinyl and CD (GFST 87; GFSTD 87)

1. "Ten Storey Love Song" (LP version) - 4:34
2. "Moses" - 6:43
3. "Ride On" - 5:46

== Charts ==
Weekly chart performance
| Chart (1995) | Peak position |
|---|---|
| UK (Network Chart) | 29 |

== Certifications ==
Certifications and sales
| Region | Certification | Certified units/sales |
|---|---|---|
| United Kingdom (BPI) | Silver | 200,000^{‡} |
^{‡} Sales+streaming figures based on certification alone.

== Release history ==
| Region | Date | Format(s) | Label(s) | Ref. |
|---|---|---|---|---|
| United Kingdom | 27 February 1995 | 7-inch vinyl; 12-inch vinyl; CD; cassette | Geffen | |
| United States | 24 April 1995 | Alternative radio | Geffen | |
| Japan | 24 May 1995 | CD | Geffen | |
