= Begging You =

1995 single by the Stone Roses

Single by the Stone Roses

from the album Second Coming
- Released: 30 October 1995
- Length: 4:52
- Label: Geffen
- Songwriters: Ian Brown, John Squire
- Producers: Simon Dawson, Paul Schroeder

The Stone Roses singles chronology
"Ten Storey Love Song" (1995)	"Begging You" (1995)	"All for One" (2016)

"Begging You" is a song by English rock band the Stone Roses, released as the final single until 2016 before their initial break-up a year later, and was the third single from their second album, Second Coming (1994). "Begging You" was released in the United Kingdom and Australia, peaking at number 15 on the UK Singles Chart.

"Begging You" is a loud, cacophonous track with heavy drum beats, soaring guitars, pulsing bass and apocalyptic lyrics. John Squire said that the song was loosely based on material from Public Enemy's Fear of a Black Planet. The song also contains many references to Aesop's Fables.

== Background and composition ==
"Begging You" was inspired by the group's memory of a dark turn of events in Manchester's hedonistic club scene, where ravers would take too many drugs and drugs would become adulterated as "dealers try to maximise profit margins", leading to the emergence of drug gangs. Ian Brown explained, "too many people take one too many". He described the song as "like when you're in a club and everything's beautiful and you're E'd up, and you've got some voice going in your ear saying how can they get you a gun or an ounce of this and that".

Aside from Squire's guitar figure, which has been described as musical punctuation, the music sits at the bottom end, with a "deep, heavy repeated riff" from Mani and Reni. The rhythmic lyrics feature references to Aesop's Fables: "The fly on the coach wheel told me that he got it / And he knew what to do with it / Everybody saw it / Saw the dust that he made".

== Cover artwork ==
John Squire designed the "Begging You" cover with the insides of floppy disks. The disks were supposedly used to teach Squire how to use samplers and sequencers for the track. Squire found the process too complicated and decided to smash the disks and use them for a piece of art instead.

Squire took the insides of the disks and set them in plaster. He arranged them in a grid motif and painted the piece with colours "borrowed" from an Edgar Degas painting.

== Critical reception ==
When Second Coming was released, Select invited several "experts, Roses associates and over-opinionated pundits" to review the album's songs. Radio DJ Mark Radcliffe described "Begging You" as a great song that resembled "the Mondays meets the White Album", while presenter Tracey MacLeod praised the song's techno style "only done with real instruments" and felt it was "like a Steppenwolf for the '90s", and Tricky described it as "wicked".

Writer Simon Reynolds called "Begging You" the "most thrilling track" on Second Coming. Describing it as a "hyperkinetic rock/techno fusion of ballistic blues riffs and looped beats", and highlighting the churning groove and "turbine-roar" guitar, he felt the song accurately simulates "the panic rush of an E'd-up raver wondering how and why the rave dream's dying all around him". David Pollock of The Guardian named it among the Stone Roses' ten best songs in 2016, saying "it still sounds fresher than most of its contemporaries", writing: "It is to drum and bass what the Beatles’ Tomorrow Never Knows was to acid house". NME called the song a "high-speed dancefloor dogfight", while Louder Than War writer John Robb called it an indie dance track with a "disturbed helter skelter, pile driving, neo-industrial nature" that made it ideal for remixing.

== Music video ==
The music video for "Begging You" features a scantily clad female dance troupe wearing masks of the band members' faces, and scenes of the band performing live, intercut with archival film footage of traditional folk dances from various cultures around the globe.

== Track listings ==
12-inch vinyl (Geffen GEFST 22060)

1. "Begging You" (album version) (4:52)
2. "Begging You" (Chic mix) (5:32)
3. "Begging You" (Cox's Ultimatum mix) (6:33)
4. "Begging You" (Stone Corporation Vox) (6:24)

Cassette (Geffen GFSC 22060)

1. "Begging You" (album version) (4:52)
2. "Begging You" (Chic mix) (5:32)

CD (Geffen GEFSTD 22060)

1. "Begging You" (album version) (4:52)
2. "Begging You" (Lakota mix) (7:48)
3. "Begging You" (Stone Corporation Vox) (6:24)
4. "Begging You" (Chic mix) (5:32)
5. "Begging You" (Young American Primitive remix) (5:25)

Australian Tour Edition CD (Geffen GEFDM 22061)

1. "Begging You" (album version) (4:52)
2. "Begging You" (Lakota mix) (7:48)
3. "Begging You" (Stone Corporation Vox) (6:24)
4. "Begging You" (Chic mix) (5:32)
5. "Begging You" (Young American Primitive remix) (5:25)
6. "Begging You" (radio edit version) (3:48)
