= Rusholme Rock =

Studio album by Aziz Ibrahim
- Released: 29 March 2012
- Recorded: Granary Barn, Longsight & BBC Maida Vale Studios
- Genre: Acoustic
- Length: 49:30
- Label: Indus Records
- Producer: Aziz Ibrahim

Aziz Ibrahim chronology
Lahore To Longsight	Rusholme Rock

Rusholme Rock is the second album by former Stone Roses guitarist Aziz Ibrahim on Indus Records. The album has been licensed through the Italian label EGEA Records in conjunction with SAM Productions and was released on 29 March 2012.

The album features the new line-up of Aziz Ibrahim on acoustic guitar/ lead vocals/ sarod and Dalbir Singh Rattan on tabla/ paranth after the departure of Mike Joyce and Andy Rourke formerly of The Smiths.

Ibrahim describes the music on this album as "The Asian Blues". He also states his influences are from his home in the UK, predominantly the eastern culture of Manchester areas like Rusholme and Longsight. Ibrahims' songs vary from social commentary to elaborate instrumentals.

The album features three instrumentals, two of which 'Morassi' and 'Xen And Now' are from their BBC Maida Vale Session in famed Studio 4 recorded and mixed by Guy Worth, where artists such as Jimi Hendrix and Led Zeppelin previously recorded their sessions. Two covers exist, "I Fought the Law" (originally written by Sonny Curtis of The Crickets in 1959) and 'My Sitar' which is an acoustic/military tabla version of My Star, the top ten chart song written by Ian Brown and Aziz Ibrahim. 'Middle Road' and 'Morassi' originally appeared in their electric versions on the Aziz debut album Lahore to Longsight.

Rusholme Rock was mastered at Abbey Road Studios by Peter Mew. Album cover artwork was designed by the Manchester artist Si Scott.

== Personnel ==
- Aziz Ibrahim – lead vocals, acoustic guitar, backing vocals
- Dalbir Singh Rattan – tabla, paranth

== Track listing ==
No.	Title	Writer(s)	Length
1.	"Xen And Now"	Aziz Ibrahim	9:45
2.	"I Fought the Law"	Sonny Curtis	2:57
3.	"Middle Road"	Aziz Ibrahim	4:33
4.	"Kills Me"	Aziz Ibrahim	6:55
5.	"Morassi"	Aziz Ibrahim	11:12
6.	"My Sitar (My Star)"	Aziz Ibrahim, Ian Brown	5:16
7.	"Heavens' Rain"	Aziz Ibrahim	3:56
