= All for One (The Stone Roses song) =

Single by the Stone Roses
- Released: 12 May 2016
- Genre: Britpop; jangle pop; neo-psychedelia; Madchester
- Length: 3:36
- Label: Virgin EMI
- Songwriters: Ian Brown; Gary Mounfield; John Squire; Alan John Wren
- Producer: Paul Epworth

The Stone Roses singles chronology
| "Begging You" (1995) | "All for One" (2016) | "Beautiful Thing" (2016) |

"All for One" is a song by English rock band the Stone Roses. It was released in the UK on 12 May 2016, over 20 years after their previous release. The song debuted on Annie Mac's BBC Radio 1 show at shortly before 8pm on 12 May 2016 and was released immediately afterwards.

The song was released on the Stone Roses Vevo channel on YouTube, accompanied by an image of the song's title with a cut lemon representing the letter "O" of "One". The lemon has come to be associated with the band throughout their history, appearing on previous release cover art, in lyrics ("Bye Bye Badman"), as part of ticket designs, on posters and in 'teasers' of upcoming announcements, as in the run up to the release of the track.

== Track listing ==
MP3 digital download

1. "All For One" – 3:36

CD single, Y4CDRO01

1. "All For One" – 3:36

7" vinyl single, Y4LPRO01

1. "All For One" – 3:36

Neither format included B-sides.

== Personnel ==
- Ian Brown – vocals
- John Squire – guitar
- Mani – bass guitar
- Reni – drums and backing vocals

== Charts ==
| Chart (2016) | Peak position |
|---|---|
| Ireland (IRMA) | 49 |
| Scotland Singles (OCC) | 3 |
| UK Singles (OCC) | 17 |
