= Beautiful Thing (The Stone Roses song) =

Single by the Stone Roses
- Released: 9 June 2016
- Genre: Madchester; dance-rock; neo-psychedelia; funk rock
- Length: 7:02
- Label: Virgin EMI
- Songwriters: Ian Brown; Gary Mounfield; John Squire; Alan John Wren
- Producer: Paul Epworth

The Stone Roses singles chronology
"All for One" (2016)	"Beautiful Thing" (2016)

"Beautiful Thing" is a song by English rock band the Stone Roses. The track was first released on the band's YouTube channel, with a simple image of a green butterfly accompanying the track. The 12" vinyl, limited to 6,000 copies (worldwide), was released on July 22, 2016. This is their final single, prior to their second disbandment the following year in 2017 and the death of bassist Gary Mounfield in 2025.

== Reception ==
The track was reviewed by the Guardian as "solid, rather than earth shattering" but "a substantial improvement on its predecessor", referring to the single "All for One". They also observed it included common Stone Roses touchstones, such as references to Jesus, portions of the song reversed and guitar solos treated with a wah-wah pedal. Neil McCormick described the song as "seven minutes of splendid shuffling psychedelic monster acid rock funk" in a review for The Daily Telegraph.

== Track listing ==
MP3 digital download

1. "Beautiful Thing" – 7:02

12" vinyl single

1. "Beautiful Thing" – 7:02

Neither format includes B-sides.

== Personnel ==
- Ian Brown – vocals
- John Squire – guitar
- Mani – bass guitar
- Reni – drums and backing vocals

== Charts ==
Chart (2016)	Peak position
Ireland (IRMA)	61
UK Singles (OCC)	21
