= Unfinished Monkey Business =

Studio album by Ian Brown
- Released: 2 February 1998
- Recorded: (1997) Manchester/Chiswick Reach Studios, London
- Genres: Alternative rock; psychedelic rock; electronic rock; lo-fi
- Length: 53:02
- Label: Polydor
- Producer: Ian Brown

Ian Brown chronology
Unfinished Monkey Business (1998)	Golden Greats (1999)

Singles from Unfinished Monkey Business
- 1. "My Star" Released: 12 January 1998; 2. "Corpses in Their Mouths" Released: 23 March 1998; 3. "Can't See Me" Released: 8 June 1998

Unfinished Monkey Business is the debut studio album by Ian Brown released in February 1998 via Polydor Records. The album was self-financed and produced by Brown, and was his first album release since the break-up of The Stone Roses in October 1996. Ex-Roses members Mani, Reni, Nigel Ipinson, Aziz Ibrahim and Robbie Maddix helped pen and perform the instruments on many of the album's tracks. "Ice Cold Cube", which premiered at The Stone Roses final concert, was first released on this album.

== Background and recording ==
Much of Unfinished Monkey Business focuses on the acrimonious split between Brown and former Roses' guitarist John Squire. Brown shares his unabashed opinion of his ex-bandmate on tracks including "Ice Cold Cube", "Can't See Me", "What Happened To Ya" and "Deep Pile Dreams", focusing in particular on Squire's supposed self-centredness, two-facedness and dependence on drugs, specifically cocaine.

The track "Intro Under The Paving Stones: The Beach" was inspired by a slogan from the French May 1968 protests, an event that also inspired the song "Bye Bye Badman" from The Stone Roses. A popular protest slogan at the time, "Sous les pavés, la plage !" is translated into English as "Beneath the pavement, the beach!", and refers to the sand found under paving stones ripped up by rioters to use as projectiles aimed at the police.

The words 'I only ever wanted the one with the flag but all you ever wanted was a sixty dollar bag and a cheap limousine for your deep pile dreams on the highway' also appear in Babyshambles' second album, Shotter's Nation. As a result, Brown has songwriting credits on the track "French Dog Blues".

Recording began in Brown's home studio and was completed at Chiswick Reach Studios in London. Brown played most of the instruments himself.

On the album's title, Brown stated "The press used to refer to me as 'simian lead singer'. My arms have always been too long for my body. But I've been called 'monkey' all my life, so I thought I'd keep that theme."

== Critical reception ==
Professional ratings
Review scores
Source	Rating
AllMusic	2.5/5 stars
The Guardian	4/5 stars
The Independent	2/5 stars
NME	8/10 stars
PopMatters	7/10 stars
Select	2/5 stars
Uncut	3/5 stars

The Times Colonist noted, "Although the styles found on Unfinished Monkey Business range from ambient to acoustic to Latin surf rhythms, they all tie up nicely by the album's spacey, electronic ending."

== Track listing ==
1. "Intro Under the Paving Stones: The Beach" (n/a) – 1:50
2. "My Star" (Brown, Aziz Ibrahim) – 5:13
3. "Can't See Me" (Brown, Gary Mounfield) – 4:54
4. "Ice Cold Cube" (Brown, Ibrahim) – 6:27
5. "Sunshine" (Brown) – 3:58
6. "Lions" (Brown) – 6:52
7. "Corpses in Their Mouths" (Brown, Ibrahim) – 4:09
8. "What Happened to Ya Part 1" (Brown, Nigel Ippinson, Robbie Maddix, Ibrahim) – 3:15
9. "What Happened to Ya Part 2" (Brown, Ippinson, Maddix, Ibrahim) – 5:38
10. "Nah Nah" (Ippinson) – 3:55
11. "Deep Pile Dreams" (Brown) – 3:39
12. "Unfinished Monkey Business" (Brown) – 3:11

== Personnel ==
Musicians

- Ian Brown - lead vocals, guitar (tracks 3, 8), bass guitar (tracks 3, 4), keyboards (track 4), drums (track 4), harmonica (track 7), acoustic guitar (track 8), all instruments (tracks 1, 5, 6, 11, 12)
- Aziz Ibrahim - guitar (tracks 2, 4, 9, 10), bass guitar (tracks 2, 7), drums (tracks 2, 4, 7, 8), tabla (track 2), backing vocals (track 7), slide guitar (track 8)
- Simon Moore - drums (tracks 2, 4, 9)
- Mani - bass guitar (track 3)
- Reni - drums (track 3)
- Robbie Maddix - drums (except track 3)
- Nigel Ippinson - bass guitar (track 10), keyboards (track 10)
- Noel Walters - backing vocals (tracks 2, 7)
- Abdul Ibrahim - chant (track 9)
- Denise Johnson - backing vocals (track 6)

Production

- Ian Brown - design, production, mixing (tracks 1, 2, 5 to 9, 11, 12)
- Nigel Luby - additional engineering
- Dave Hyatt - engineering
- Nick Terry - engineering
- Fabiola Quiroz - photography
- Aziz Ibrahim - additional production
