= Time Changes Everything =

Studio album by John Squire
- Released: 16 September 2002
- Studio: The Garage, Kent
- Length: 46:52
- Label: North Country Records
- Producer: John Squire; Simon Dawson

John Squire chronology
Time Changes Everything (2002)	Marshall's House (2004)

Time Changes Everything is the debut studio album by the English guitarist John Squire, released in 2002 on his own North Country Records label.

The album contains many allusions to Squire's former band The Stone Roses, not least the cover which features an animal skull splattered with paint in the style of Jackson Pollock, a technique used by Squire for his covers of The Stone Roses debut album, its accompanying singles, Turns into Stone and The Very Best of The Stone Roses compilations. The songs "I Miss You" and "15 Days" both feature references to The Stone Roses, with many critics seeing the former as evidence of Squire's wish to end his long running feud with singer Ian Brown.

== Critical reception ==
Professional ratings
Aggregate scores
Source	Rating
Metacritic	50/100
Review scores
Source	Rating
AllMusic	3/5 stars
Dotmusic	3/5 stars
Drowned in Sound	2/10
The Guardian	2/5 stars
Mojo	3/5 stars
NME	8/10
Playlouder	1/5 stars
Q	2/5 stars
Stylus	6.9/10
Uncut	1/5 stars

Time Changes Everything was met with "mixed or average" reviews from critics. At Metacritic, which assigns a weighted average rating out of 100 to reviews from mainstream publications, this release received an average score of 50 based on 7 reviews.

In a review for AllMusic, Anders Kaasen wrote: "Let there be no doubt: the singing on this record isn't pretty. Squire croons dementedly throughout the whole album, resembling several other distinctive vocalists. The production is altogether exquisite, giving Time Changes Everything a fittingly warm, organic, early-'70s sound; hammond organ, mellotron, and Fender Rhodes are features throughout the whole record. It is mainly due to his brilliance as a guitarist that John Squire has attained legendary status." Dorian Lynskey of The Guardian said: "Novice vocalist Squire has the voice of a pub singer who has settled on a grim amalgam of David Bowie and Bob Dylan. The music is small improvement: at best amiable Tom Pettyish country-rock, at worst Brothers in Arms by Dire Straits. If it were any more middle-of-the-road it would be a traffic island."

== Chart performance ==
Time Changes Everything peaked at number 17 on the UK Official Albums Chart for the week of 22 September 2002, and number 5 in Scotland.

== Track listing ==
All tracks are written by John Squire, unless noted.

Time Changes Everything track listing
No.	Title	Length
1.	"Joe Louis"	4:05
2.	"I Miss You"	3:51
3.	"Shine a Little Light"	3:43
4.	"Time Changes Everything"	4:45
5.	"Welcome to the Valley"	2:52
6.	"15 Days" (contains an extract from prayer by Archbishop Alexander Christie, taken from The British Soldiers Testament)	6:22
7.	"Transatlantic Near Death Experience"	5:56
8.	"All I Really Want"	3:51
9.	"Strange Feeling"	5:19
10.	"Sophia"	6:03

Japanese bonus edition
No.	Title	Length
11.	"Home Sweet Home (bonus track)"	3:40
12.	"See You on the Other Side (bonus track)"	3:44
13.	"15 Days (home demo)"	6:23
14.	"I Miss You (home demo)"	3:42
15.	"Joe Louis (video)"

== Personnel ==
Credits adapted from AllMusic.

Musicians

- John Squire – vocals, guitar, percussion
- Jonathan White – bass
- Andy Treacey – drums
- Mark Heaney - drums
- John Ellis – piano, Hammond organ, Fender Rhodes, Mellotron, clavinet, saxophone, bass clarinet, snake charmer's pipe

Production

- Simon Dawson − engineer, producer
- Chris Blair − mastering

== Charts ==
Chart performance for Time Changes Everything
Chart (2002)	Peak position
Scottish Albums (OCC)	5
UK Albums (OCC)	17
UK Independent Albums (OCC)	1
