= Aziz Ibrahim =

British musician (born 1964)

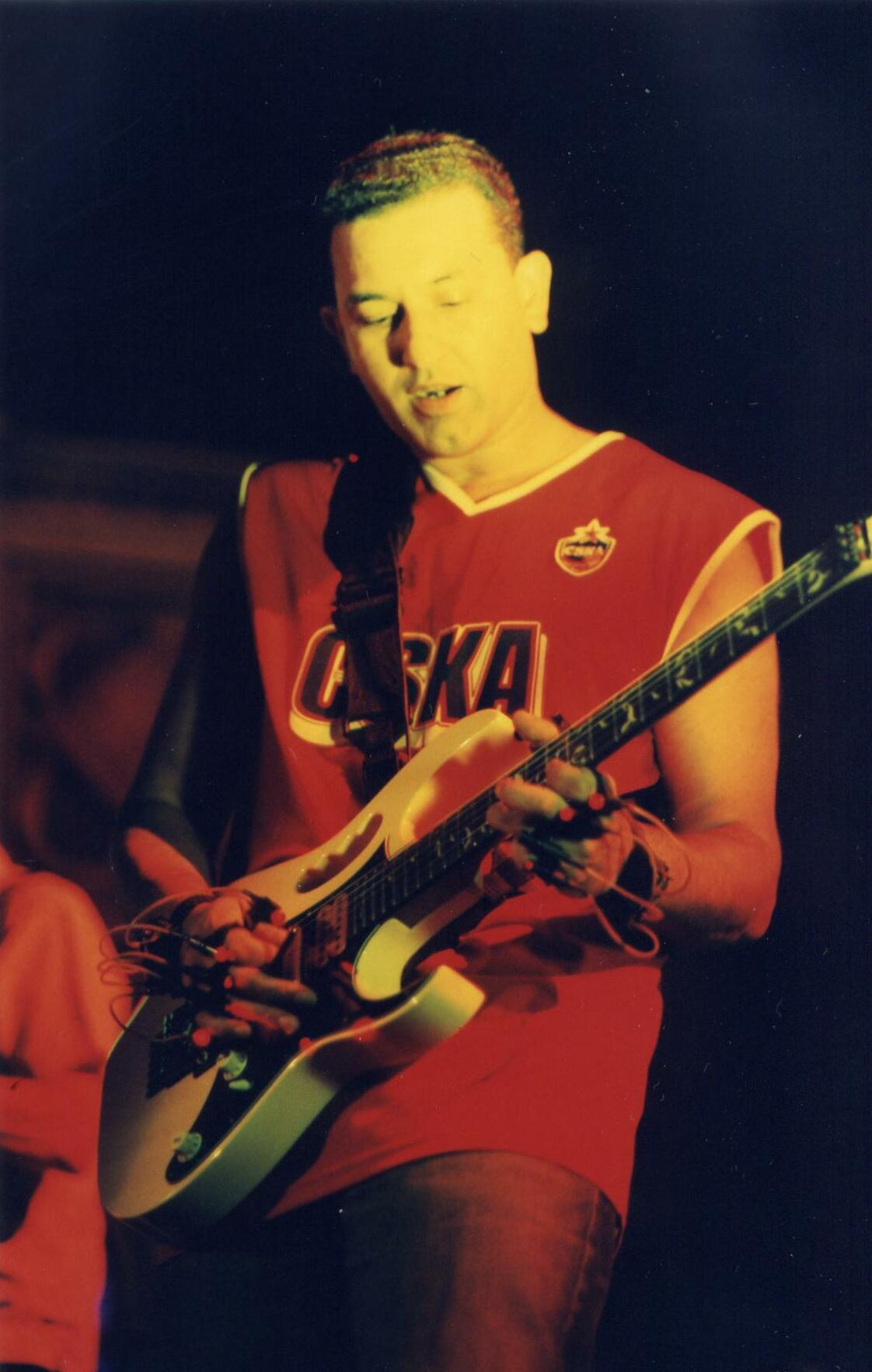
- Performing with The h Band in 2007

Background information
- Born: Aziz-Ur-Rahman Ibrahim; 19 March 1964 (age 62); Longsight, Manchester, England
- Genres: Alternative rock, indie rock, progressive rock, blue-eyed soul
- Occupations: Musician; producer
- Instrument: Guitar
- Years active: 1987–present
- Label: Indus Records - No Label Records
- Member of: The h Band; Ian Brown band
- Formerly of: Simply Red; The Stone Roses; The Players

Aziz Ibrahim (born 19 March 1964) is a British guitarist. He was born in Longsight, Manchester to Pakistani parents on 19 March 1964. He is best known for his work as guitarist with Simply Red, The Stone Roses (post-John Squire) and their former vocalist Ian Brown in whose band he regularly performs – both in the studio and live. He is also a member of the H Band with Marillion's lead singer Steve Hogarth and is involved in the writing of the second H Band album. He has also worked with Paul Weller, Steven Wilson, Asia and contributed to The Players debut album Clear the Decks.

Ibrahim's first release was the CD EP Middle Road featuring guest vocals and guitar from Paul Weller. Ibrahim also provided the vocals for Weller's spoken word song entitled "God", on his 2008 album, 22 Dreams along with guitars for previous Paul Weller releases, e.g. Illumination. He followed that with his début album entitled Lahore to Longsight, which he describes as being 'Asian Blues', the album title describes his family journey from Lahore to Longsight, Lahore being the second city of Pakistan and Longsight Aziz's birthplace in inner city Manchester, where he still lives. He performed on the Simply Red 1987/88 world tour but did not feature on the following album. He was called in to replace original guitarist Sylvan Richardson who had left after recording the second album. At this point, apart from Sylvan the line-up featured all original members.

Most notably, Ibrahim was the guitarist for the last Stone Roses performance before they split, at the 1996 Reading Festival. After their split Ibrahim continued to tour and write with former Stone Roses front man Ian Brown, co-writing songs such as "My Star", "Corpses in Their Mouths", "Longsight M13", "One Way Ticket to Paradise" and numerous other songs from Unfinished Monkey Business, Golden Greats, Solarized and The Greatest.

Ibrahim also scored the music for the Psygnosis PlayStation game Eliminator. The music in the game features samples, electric guitars with effects, electronic drum kits, percussion, and techno sounds.

Ibrahim co-founded "No Label" – the name initially came from Ibrahim in a rant about major record labels, how he didn't need them and would start his own label and call it 'No Label Records'. The label was initially formed with co-directors John Sherrington, Nova Rehman and employing Ahsan Naeem as A&R scout. After No Label was established in Bolton, Ibrahim later took a back seat to the set up concentrating on his music. The labels' first release was the début single 'Middle Road" from Aziz Ibrahim followed by the signing of Mark Coyle's group 'Tailgunner'. No Label was liquidated in 2000. After the demise of No Label, Ibrahim founded the Longsight Manchester based label Indus Records Ltd.

In 2019 Aziz became patron of All Fm 96.9 community radio station in Manchester www.allfm.org

Ibrahim has also been involved in the British Guitar Academy, founded by Steve Rothery of Marillion.
