= Lahore to Longsight =

Studio album by Aziz Ibrahim
- Released: January 2001
- Genre: Rock
- Label: Indus Records
- Producer: Aziz Ibrahim

Aziz Ibrahim chronology
Lahore to Longsight	Rusholme Rock

Lahore to Longsight is the debut album of British musician Aziz Ibrahim. Ibrahim describes it as being 'Asian Blues', the album title describes his family's journey from Lahore to Longsight, Lahore being the second largest city of Pakistan and Longsight Aziz's birthplace in inner city Manchester, where he still lives.

== Description ==
The Album was recorded over at various studios around the country, and is graced with guest appearances from Paul Weller, Steve White, Andy Rourke, Mike Joyce, Talvin Singh, Mani, Reni and Inder Goldfinger. All tracks were produced by Aziz Ibrahim and barring a couple, were written, and arranged by Aziz Ibrahim. The two co-writes on the album are titled "Korma Coma" and 'Mummys' Boy'. The former written with his live band, Andy Rourke and Mike Joyce, the latter inspired by Reni.

== Track list ==
1. "Morassi"
2. "Living a Lie"
3. "Mummy's Boy"
4. "Feeling Better"
5. "Forget Yourself"
6. "She Dances With Angels"
7. "The Other Side"
8. "A Face to Die For"
9. "Middle Road"
10. "Stone Haven"
11. "Korma Coma"
12. "Lahore to Longsight"
13. "It's a Pressure to Know You"

== Reviews ==
The album received positive reviews from critics such as Aaron Warshaw.
