= Just Another Rainbow =

Single by Liam Gallagher and John Squire

from the album Liam Gallagher John Squire
- Released: 5 January 2024
- Genre: Rock
- Length: 5:36
- Label: Warner UK
- Songwriter: John Squire
- Producer: Greg Kurstin

Liam Gallagher singles chronology
"More Power" (2023)	"Just Another Rainbow" (2024)	"Mars to Liverpool" (2024)

John Squire singles chronology
"Room In Brooklyn" (2004)	"Just Another Rainbow" (2024)	"Mars to Liverpool" (2024)

Music video
- "Just Another Rainbow" on YouTube

"Just Another Rainbow" is a song by Liam Gallagher and John Squire, released as the first single from the two's collaborative album Liam Gallagher John Squire.

== Composition and lyrics ==
According to John Squire: "To me, the most obvious take on 'Just Another Rainbow' is that it’s about disappointment, and the sentiment is that you never get what you really want. But I don’t like to explain songs. I think that’s the privilege of the listener; it’s whatever you want it to be. To me, it’s also one of the most uplifting tracks we’ve made together, which is weird." Liam Gallagher sings the colours of the rainbow in order on the track.

== Artwork ==
The artwork, credited to Jamie Hutchinson and John Squire, depicts a can of lacquer spray paint with the song title.

== Release and reception ==
Professional ratings
Review scores
Source	Rating
The Guardian	3/5 stars

The Guardian critic Alexis Petridis states that it "sounds almost exactly like you would expect a collaboration between the pair to sound". Writing that Gallagher does his "patent ennon-esque keening over the top", Petridis likens the track to the Beatles song "Tomorrow Never Knows", giving the single 3 of 5 stars. Consequence of Sound awarded it their song of the week for 5 January 2024, stating it "sounds like ’90s Manchester all over again", noting it "doesn’t necessarily reinvent Gallagher or Squire; all of the usual influences are present in the song’s construction and production". In a review for BrooklynVegan, critic Bill Pearis notes Gallagher's vocals "drip with attitude while Squire brings his signature riffage to the proceedings", and that it "sounds pretty much just like you’d expect it to, which is a good thing".

== Music video ==
A music video for the song directed by Charles Mehling premiered on 10 January 2024, and was filmed in Bury, Greater Manchester, England, and features the two performing in an abandoned railway tunnel, the two performing in front of a wall with psychedelic colours on a wall, and a live performance of the song.

== Credits and personnel ==
Credits adapted from Rolling Stone, the album's liner notes and the single liner notes:

- Liam Gallagher – vocals
- John Squire – guitar, songwriter
- Joey Waronker – drums
- Greg Kurstin – bass, percussion, synthesizers, vibraphone, mellotron, keyboards, producer, engineer
- Mark Stent – mixer
- Julian Burg – engineer
- Matt Tuggle – engineer
- Engineered at No Expectations Studios, Hollywood, CA, USA

== Charts ==
Chart (2024)	Peak position
Ireland (IRMA)	76
UK Singles (OCC)	16
UK Singles Downloads (OCC)	2
