= Ripples (album) =

Studio album by Ian Brown
- Released: 1 February 2019
- Genre: Alternative rock
- Length: 42:43
- Label: Polydor
- Producer: Ian Brown

Ian Brown chronology
My Way (2009)	Ripples (2019)

Singles from Ripples
- 1. "First World Problems" Released: 25 October 2018; 2. "Black Roses" Released: 13 December 2018; 3. "From Chaos to Harmony" Released: 4 January 2019; 4. "Ripples" Released: 26 January 2019

Professional ratings
Aggregate scores
Source	Rating
AnyDecentMusic?	5.3/10
Metacritic	62/100
Review scores
Source	Rating
Clash	5/10
Drowned in Sound	4/10
MusicOMH	2.5/5 stars
NME	2/5 stars

Ripples is the seventh studio album by English singer Ian Brown, and is fully performed and produced by himself. The album was initially set to be released on 1 March 2019, but soon after the album's release date was brought forward to 1 February 2019. The album's release was announced on 25 October 2018 with the release of the first single "First World Problems".

== Release ==
A music video was released to promote the single and the album. The video shows Brown cycling by the Bridgewater Canal on a bike similar to the one seen in the F.E.A.R. music video. In the video, Brown is seen wearing a sweatshirt with the words “I know the truth and I know what you’re thinking” on the back, a reference to the Stone Roses song "Fools Gold". Throughout the video, Brown plays on several instruments, including guitars, bass, drums, bongos, and a cabasa. This album is Brown's first album for a decade since his previous album My Way (2009) and his first since the reunion and second disbandment of The Stone Roses. The album received mixed reviews from music critics.

== Track listing ==
All tracks are written by Ian Brown, excepted where noted.

No.	Title	Writer(s)	Length
1.	"First World Problems"		5:57
2.	"Black Roses"	Barrington Levy	2:38
3.	"Breathe and Breath Easy (The Everness of Now)"		3:27
4.	"The Dream and the Dreamer"		5:37
5.	"From Chaos to Harmony"		4:01
6.	"It's Raining Diamonds"		3:10
7.	"Ripples"		3:43
8.	"Blue Sky Day"		5:10
9.	"Soul Satisfaction"		4:08
10.	"Break Down the Walls (Warm-Up Jams)"	Michael Campbell	4:52
Total length:			42:43

== Charts ==
Chart (2019)	Peak position
Australian Digital Albums (ARIA)	50
Irish Albums (IRMA)	14
Scottish Albums (Official Charts)	2
UK Albums (Official Charts)	4
