= Living a Lie =

Living a Lie may refer to:

== Film and TV ==
- Living a Lie, a 1991 TV movie with Jill Eikenberry and Peter Coyote
- "Living a Lie", episode of Deadly Nightmares

== Music ==
=== Albums ===
- Living a Lie, an EP by Buchanan, or the title track
- Living a Lie, an album by Al Martino, or the title track

=== Songs ===
- "Living a Lie", a 2002 song by 3 Doors Down included with the single release of "When I'm Gone"
- "Living a Lie", a 2012 song by Aimee Mann from Charmer
- "Living a Lie", a 2007 song by Aqueduct from Or Give Me Death
- "Living a Lie", a 2006 song by Axel Rudi Pell from Mystica
- "Living a Lie", a 2001 song by Aziz Ibrahim from album Lahore to Longsight
- "Living a Lie", a 2006 song by Cam'ron from album Killa Season
- "Living a Lie", a 1981 song by Cozy Powell from Tilt
- "Living a Lie", a 1982 song by The dB's from album Repercussion
- "Living a Lie", a 1978 song by David Cassidy from album Getting It in the Street
- "Living a Lie", a 1990 song by Don Dokken from Up from the Ashes
- "Living a Lie", a 2007 song by Epica from album The Divine Conspiracy
- "Living a Lie", a 2012 song by For the Fallen Dreams Wasted Youth
- "Living a Lie", a 2003 song by Fuck the Facts from album Backstabber Etiquette
- "Living a Lie", a 1982 song by Gillan from Magic
- "Living a Lie", a 2011 song by Honor Society
- "Living a Lie", a 2009 song by Hope&Social from album Architect of This Church
- "Living a Lie", a 2012 song by John Dahlbäck
- "Living a Lie", a 1987 song by Johnny Logan included with the single release of "Hold Me Now"
- "Living a Lie", a 1982 song by Laura Branigan from album Branigan
- "Living a Lie", a 2002 song by Mike Tramp from album Recovering the Wasted Years
- "Living a Lie", a 2006 song by Much the Same from Survive
- "Living a Lie", a 2009 song by Pull Tiger Tail from The Lost World
- "Living a Lie", a 2003 song by Reason and Truth from album Reason and Truth
- "Living a Lie", a 1988 song by Side by Side from album You're Only Young Once...
- "Living a Lie", a 2011 song by Skindred from album Union Black
- "Living a Lie", a 2008 song by The Sorry Kisses from Hard Drive
- "Living a Lie", a 1995 song by Violent Femmes from album Rock!!!!!

== See also ==
- Living in a Lie
