= The Greatest (Ian Brown album) =

Compilation album by Ian Brown
- Released: 12 September 2005
- Recorded: 1997–2005
- Genre: Alternative rock; indie rock
- Length: 68:48
- Label: Polydor
- Producer: Various

Ian Brown chronology
Solarized (2004)	The Greatest (2005)	The World Is Yours (2007)

Singles from The Greatest
- 1. "All Ablaze" Released: 5 September 2005

Professional ratings
Review scores
Source	Rating
AllMusic	4/5 stars

The Greatest is the first compilation album from British musician Ian Brown, lead singer of the Stone Roses. It was released on 12 September 2005 and covers material from his first four albums plus two new tracks, "All Ablaze" and "Return of the Fisherman". "All Ablaze" was released as a single on 5 September 2005.

The compilation was released in a single disc Standard Edition and two disc Limited Edition; the latter includes extended liner notes in book-sized packaging.

== Track listing ==
Standard edition

1. "My Star" – 5:23
2. "Corpses in Their Mouths" – 4:11
3. "Can't See Me" (Bacon & Quarmby remix) – 3:57
4. "Be There" (UNKLE featuring Ian Brown) – 5:16
5. "Love Like a Fountain" (radio edit) – 3:32
6. "Dolphins Were Monkeys" (new version) – 2:57
7. "Golden Gaze" (single version) – 3:11
8. "F.E.A.R." – 4:29
9. "Whispers" – 3:56
10. "Forever and a Day" (The Greatest version) – 3:03
11. "Keep What Ya Got" – 4:29
12. "Time Is My Everything" – 3:53
13. "Longsight M13" – 3:12
14. "REIGN" (UNKLE featuring Ian Brown) – 5:33
15. "Lovebug" (The Greatest version) – 3:12
16. "All Ablaze" – 4:07
17. "Return of the Fisherman" – 4:19

Limited edition (bonus disc)

1. "Can't See Me" (Harvey's Invisible mix)
2. "My Star" (2002 version)
3. "Dolphins Were Monkeys" (UNKLE remix)
4. "F.E.A.R." (UNKLE remix)
5. "Thriller"
6. "Billie Jean"
7. "Time Is My Everything" (Stateside Hombres Overeasy mix)
8. "See the Dawn"
9. "Superstar"
10. "Time Is My Everything" (Them Lads remix)
11. GusGus vs Ian Brown – "Desire" (Ian Brown full length remix)
12. "F.E.A.R." (Bulletproof Freestyle version)
13. "Submission" (interview with Steve Jones for Jonesy's Juke Box 103.1 L.A.)
