= The World Is Yours (Ian Brown album) =

Studio album by Ian Brown
- Released: 15 October 2007
- Genre: Alternative rock
- Length: 48:33
- Labels: Fiction, Polydor
- Producers: Emile Haynie, Robert Maxfield, Tim Wills

Ian Brown chronology
The Greatest (2005)	The World Is Yours (2007)	My Way (2009)

Singles from The World Is Yours
- 1. "Illegal Attacks" Released: 17 September 2007; 2. "Sister Rose" Released: 3 December 2007

Professional ratings
Aggregate scores
Source	Rating
Metacritic	58/100
Review scores
Source	Rating
Allmusic	3/5 stars
The Guardian	3/5 stars
NME	6/10 stars
The Observer	3/5 stars
Rockfeedback	4/5 stars

The World Is Yours is the fifth studio album by Ian Brown, released on 15 October 2007.

In making the album, Brown enlisted the help of The Smiths and Happy Mondays bassists Andy Rourke and Paul Ryder respectively. He also sought the services of Paul McCartney to play bass on one of the tracks, but failed as McCartney was too busy at the time. Meanwhile, Sex Pistols guitarist Steve Jones and drummer Paul Cook appeared on the album. Sinéad O'Connor also sings on "Illegal Attacks" and "Some Folks Are Hollow".

"Illegal Attacks" was released as the album's first single, on 8 October 2007, and was a contentious track, dealing head-on with the political issues of the day. The opening notes of the song are plucked softly in arpeggios, which are juxtaposed with the confrontational opening line, "What the fuck is this UK?". The song then pulses with an ominous, grinding cello, and culminates with Ian Brown pleading earnestly for the return of British soldiers from Afghanistan and Iraq: "Soldiers, soldiers come home, Soldiers come home", lyrics which had previously been used in "So Many Soldiers" on Golden Greats.

The single was described by NME as another example of Ian Brown's "godlike genius… an unforgettable plea to world leaders to 'Cop the fook on.'"

The song "On Track" made its debut seven months prior to the release of the album on the soundtrack for the Russian 2-part sci-fi movie Paragraph 78 as an exclusive track. It was used in the closing titles for the first part of the movie. This version was 20 seconds longer as compared to the album version and was a bit lighter as to the orchestral arrangement.

The album was also released in a 2CD deluxe edition, along with a bonus disc containing orchestral arrangements of all twelve tracks.

== Track listing ==
=== Standard edition ===
1. "The World Is Yours"
2. "On Track"
3. "Sister Rose" (feat. Steve Jones and Paul Cook)
4. "Save Us"
5. "Eternal Flame"
6. "The Feeding of the 5000"
7. "Street Children"
8. "Some Folks Are Hollow (feat. Sinéad O'Connor)"
9. "Goodbye to the Broken"
10. "Me and You Forever" (feat. Steve Jones and Paul Cook)
11. "Illegal Attacks (feat. Sinéad O'Connor)"
12. "The World Is Yours (Reprise)"

=== Special edition (bonus disc) ===
1. "The World Is Yours (Orchestral Mix)"
2. "On Track (Orchestral Mix)"
3. "Sister Rose (Orchestral Mix)"
4. "Save Us (Orchestral Mix)"
5. "Eternal Flame (Orchestral Mix)"
6. "The Feeding of the 5000 (Orchestral Mix)"
7. "Street Children (Orchestral Mix)"
8. "Some Folks Are Hollow (featuring Sinéad O'Connor) (Orchestral Mix)"
9. "Goodbye to the Broken (Orchestral Mix)"
10. "Me and You Forever (Orchestral Mix)"
11. "Illegal Attacks (featuring Sinéad O'Connor) (Orchestral Mix)"
12. "The World Is Yours (Reprise) (Orchestral Mix)"

=== Japanese edition ===
1. "The World Is Yours"
2. "On Track"
3. "Sister Rose" (feat. Steve Jones and Paul Cook)
4. "Save Us"
5. "Eternal Flame"
6. "The Feeding of the 5000"
7. "Street Children"
8. "Some Folks Are Hollow (feat. Sinéad O'Connor)"
9. "Goodbye to the Broken"
10. "Me and You Forever" (feat. Steve Jones and Paul Cook)
11. "Illegal Attacks (feat. Sinéad O'Connor)"
12. "Sister Rose (Japanese version)"
13. "The World Is Yours (Reprise)"
