= Liam Gallagher John Squire =

Studio album by Liam Gallagher and John Squire
- Released: 1 March 2024
- Recorded: 2023
- Genres: Britpop revival; psychedelic rock
- Length: 39:40
- Label: Warner Music UK
- Producer: Greg Kurstin

Liam Gallagher chronology
Knebworth 22 (2023)	Liam Gallagher John Squire (2024)

John Squire chronology
Marshall's House (2004)	Liam Gallagher John Squire (2024)

Singles from Liam Gallagher John Squire
- 1. "Just Another Rainbow" Released: 5 January 2024; 2. "Mars to Liverpool" Released: 26 January 2024; 3. "Raise Your Hands" Released: 3 March 2024; 4. "I'm a Wheel" Released: 10 April 2024

Professional ratings
Aggregate scores
Source	Rating
Metacritic	73/100
Review scores
Source	Rating
AllMusic	4.5/5 stars
Clash	7/10
The Daily Express	5/5 stars
The Daily Telegraph	4/5 stars
Evening Standard	4/5 stars
The Guardian	3/5 stars
Hot Press	4/5 stars
Mojo	4/5 stars
NME	4/5 stars
Rolling Stone UK	3/5 stars

Liam Gallagher John Squire (also referred to as Liam Gallagher & John Squire (Note: Promotional materials and Gallagher himself refer to the album without the ampersand; the latter title is used by streaming services.)) is a collaborative studio album by English singer-songwriter Liam Gallagher (of Oasis) and guitarist John Squire (formerly of The Stone Roses) released on 1 March 2024 through Warner Music UK. The album was preceded by the singles "Just Another Rainbow" and "Mars to Liverpool" and debuted in the top position on the U.K. charts. It marks Squire's first album of new material under his own name in 20 years, since Marshall's House (2004); on this record, however, Squire didn't sing on any songs of the album.

== Singles ==
On 5 January 2024, Gallagher and Squire released "Just Another Rainbow". The single debuted and peaked at number 16 on the UK Singles Chart. The song was performed live on ITV on The Jonathan Ross Show which aired 9 March.

The album's second single, "Mars to Liverpool", was released on 26 January 2024. Like its predecessor, it peaked at number 16 on the UK Singles Downloads Chart.

The album's third single, "Raise Your Hands", was released on 3 March 2024.

The album's fourth single, "I'm a Wheel", was released on 10 April 2024, and was promoted on The Tonight Show starring Jimmy Fallon.

== Tour ==
The duo announced a 2024 tour on 26 January, which began on 13 March at the Barrowland Ballroom in Glasgow, Scotland, and concluded on 11 April at the Brooklyn Paramount Theater in New York City. Joining Gallagher and Squire as their backing band were the album's drummer Joey Waronker, Gallagher's longtime touring keyboardist Christian Madden, and Barrie Cadogan – who had played guitar for Gallagher from 2022 to 2023 – on bass. The tour's setlist consisted of all ten tracks from the album, along with a cover of "Jumpin' Jack Flash" by The Rolling Stones.

== Track listing ==
All tracks are written by John Squire.

"Liam Gallagher John Squire" track listing
No.	Title	Length
1.	"Raise Your Hands"	4:20
2.	"Mars to Liverpool"	3:40
3.	"One Day at a Time"	3:43
4.	"I'm a Wheel"	3:46
5.	"Just Another Rainbow"	5:36
6.	"Love You Forever"	3:35
7.	"Make It Up as You Go Along"	2:11
8.	"You're Not the Only One"	3:56
9.	"I'm So Bored"	4:46
10.	"Mother Nature's Song"	4:07
Total length:		39:40

== Personnel ==
Musicians

- Liam Gallagher – vocals (all tracks), hand claps (tracks 1, 3, 4, 7, 8), remixing (track 8)
- John Squire – electric guitar (all tracks), acoustic guitar (tracks 1–3, 7, 9, 10), hand claps (tracks 1, 3, 4, 7)
- Greg Kurstin – bass (all tracks), drum programming (track 1), percussion (tracks 1, 3–8), hand claps (tracks 1, 3, 4), synthesizer (tracks 1, 4, 5, 8), keyboards (tracks 1, 5), piano (tracks 1, 10), Hammond B3 organ (track 2), Wurlitzer (track 2), Mellotron (tracks 5, 10), vibraphone (track 5); congas, upright piano (track 8)
- Joey Waronker – drums
- Debbie Gwyther – hand claps (tracks 1, 3, 4, 7)
- Martha Squire – hand claps (tracks 1, 3, 4, 7)

Technical

- Greg Kurstin – production, engineering
- John Greenham – mastering
- Mark "Spike" Stent – mixing
- Julian Burg – engineering
- Matt Tuggle – engineering

== Charts ==
Chart performance for Liam Gallagher John Squire
Chart (2024)	Peak position
Australian Albums (ARIA)	65
Belgian Albums (Flanders)	38
Belgian Albums (Wallonia)	9
Croatian International Albums (HDU)	14
Dutch Albums (MegaCharts)	84
French Albums (SNEP)	20
German Albums (GfK)	9
Hungarian Albums (MAHASZ)	36
Irish Albums (IRMA)	1
Italian Albums (FIMI)	7
Japanese Combined Albums (Oricon)	30
Japanese Hot Albums (Billboard Japan)	14
New Zealand Albums (RMNZ)	32
Portuguese Albums (AFP)	116
Scottish Albums (Official Charts Company)	1
Swiss Albums (Swiss Charts)	5
UK Albums (Official Charts Company)	1

== Certifications ==
Region	Certification	Certified units/sales
United Kingdom (BPI)	Silver	60,000^{‡}
^{‡} Sales+streaming figures based on certification alone.
