= Can't See Me =

Single by Ian Brown

from the album Unfinished Monkey Business
- Released: 8 June 1998
- Recorded: Manchester/Chiswick Reach Studios, London
- Genre: Alternative, dance-rock
- Length: 4:54; 3:56 (Bacon & Quarmby Remix)
- Label: Polydor
- Songwriters: Brown, Mounfield
- Producer: Ian Brown

Ian Brown singles chronology
"Corpses in Their Mouths" (1998)	"Can't See Me" (1998)	"Be There" (1999)

"Can't See Me" is a song by Ian Brown. It was written by Brown and Mani and produced by Brown. The song was remixed by Bacon & Quarmby and released as the third single from Brown's debut studio album Unfinished Monkey Business. It was released in June 1998, and rose to number 21 on the UK Singles Chart. The song's lyrics refer to an incident when Brown saw His former Stone Roses band-mate John Squire in a village in Hale, Greater Manchester, not long after the split of the band. According to this story, Brown waved to Squire, but Squire hid behind a newspaper and would not acknowledge him.

== Recording ==
In an interview with Making Music in 1998, Brown spoke about the song:

It came from Mani sitting down with his portastudio and coming up with a bassline, but we only found out last week that Reni doesn't actually play on it - it's a breakbeat Mani sampled. I thought it was a sample Reni took from the studio that Mani played to, but it was actually a breakbeat.

I've got a big pillowcase of tapes at home of Roses live shows and rehearsals and stuff, and I was just going through them one day and I found this bassline and remembered it. So I phoned him up, said, 'Can I put some Iyrics over this for my record ?' and he said, 'Course you can'.

== Track listing ==
Enhanced Maxi-Single CD 1

1. "Can't See Me" (Bacon & Quarmby Remix) - 3:56
2. "Can't See Me" (Harvey's Invisible Mix) - 4:40
3. "Come Again (Part 2)" - 3:51
4. "My Star" (CD-Rom Video)

Enhanced Maxi Single CD 2 Enhanced

1. "Can't See Me" (Bacon & Quarmby Remix) - 3:56
2. "Can't See Me" (Bacon & Quarmby Vocal Dub) - 5:02
3. "Under The Paving Stones: The Beach" (Gabriel's 13th Dream Remix) - 4:39
4. "Corpses" (CD-Rom Video)

7" Vinyl Single

1. "Can't See Me" (Bacon & Quarmby Remix) - 3:56
2. "Can't See Me" (Bacon & Quarmby Vocal Dub) - 5:02

12" Vinyl Single

1. "Can't See Me" (Bacon & Quarmby Remix) - 3:56
2. "Can't See Me" (Bacon & Quarmby Vocal Dub) - 5:02
3. "Can't See Me" (Harvey's Invisible Mix) - 4:37
4. "Can't See Me" (Harvey's Instrumental Mix) - 4:37
5. "Under The Paving Stones: The Beach" (Gabriel's 13th Dream Remix) - 4:27

== Personnel ==
- Ian Brown - Rhythm Bass Guitar, Lead Guitar, Producer, Mixing
- Mani - Original Bass, Lead Bass Guitar
- Reni - Drums
- Dave Hyatt - Mixing
