= Little Seed, Big Tree =

Single by Ian Brown
- Released: 18 September 2020
- Genre: Rock
- Length: 5:10
- Label: Black Koi
- Songwriter: Ian Brown
- Producer: Ian Brown

"Little Seed, Big Tree" is a single by English musician Ian Brown, released on 18 September 2020. An anti-lockdown song, it received a negative reaction from critics, and split fan reaction.

== Background ==
Brown had previously made numerous anti-mask and anti-lockdown remarks on Twitter, such as a tweet reading "NO LOCKDOWN NO TESTS NO TRACKS NO MASKS NO VAX #researchanddestroy", and also criticised Bill Gates. In a deleted tweet, he also described the coronavirus pandemic as "planned and designed to make us digital slaves".

== Release ==
The song was released on 18 September 2020. Described by Louder Than War as "sparse and atmospheric", its lyrics feature references to several conspiracy theories, including the New World Order, chemtrails, 5G radiation, and forced microchip implanting. It was removed from Spotify in March 2021, with Brown claiming it as an act of "censorship", while Spotify stated it "prohibits content on the platform which promotes dangerous false, deceptive, or misleading content about Covid-19". During this time it remained available on Apple Music.

== Reception ==
Robin Murray of Clash described the song as "genuinely appalling" and as a "career low from a British great". Ewan Gleadow of Cult Following called the song a "convulsing, flailing pocket of nonsense" which was "set on dismantling and disrupting sensible advice".

Fan reaction to the song was mixed, with some offering praise, while others criticised the political message.
