= Music of the Spheres (Ian Brown album) =

Studio album by Ian Brown
- Released: 1 October 2001
- Genres: Alternative rock; Indie rock; electropop
- Length: 41:08
- Label: Polydor
- Producer: Francis Dunnery

Ian Brown chronology
Golden Greats (1999)	Music of the Spheres (2001)	Remixes of the Spheres (2002)

Singles from Music of the Spheres
- 1. "F.E.A.R." Released: 17 September 2001; 2. "Whispers" Released: 11 February 2002

Professional ratings
Aggregate scores
Source	Rating
Metacritic	63/100
Review scores
Source	Rating
AllMusic	4/5 stars

Music of the Spheres is the third studio album released by Ian Brown, the ex-frontman of the Stone Roses. It employs minimalist song structures with tracks like "Hear No See No" and "El mundo pequeño", sung in Spanish. The song "Whispers" won Muso's 2002 award for Best Single. The Canadian edition of the album omits Track 5, "Hear No See No".

== Track listing ==
No.	Title	Writer(s)	Length
1.	"F.E.A.R."	Ian Brown, Dave McCracken, Dave Colquhoun	4:29
2.	"Stardust"	Brown, McCracken, Tim Wills	4:30
3.	"The Gravy Train"	Brown, McCracken, Dan Bierton, Greg Hatwell	4:23
4.	"Bubbles"	Brown, McCracken, Mark Sayfritz	4:35
5.	"Hear No See No"	Brown, McCracken, Sayfritz	3:35
6.	"Northern Lights"	Brown, McCracken, Dave Colquhoun	4:13
7.	"Whispers"	Brown, McCracken, Wills	3:56
8.	"El Mundo Pequeño"	Brown, Francis Dunnery	4:01
9.	"Forever and a Day"	Brown, McCracken, Dunnery	2:44
10.	"Shadow of a Saint"	Brown, McCracken, Wills	4:42

Japanese edition (UICP 1021) bonus tracks
No.	Title	Writer(s)	Length
11.	"Superstar"	Brown, McCracken	4:49
12.	"My Star 2001"	Brown, Ibrahim	4:04

== Personnel ==
- Ian Brown – vocals
- Dave Colquhoun (1), Dave McCracken (4), Francis Dunnery (1–9), Tim Wills (6, 9) – guitar
- Dave McCracken (4, 6), Francis Dunnery (6), Matt Pegg (5, 7, 9) – bass guitar
- Dave McCracken (1–9), Mark Sayfritz (4) – keyboards, programming
- Inder "Goldfinger" Matharu – percussion (7, 9)
- Dan Liebermann, Francis Dunnery (5) – backing vocals
- Anthony Pleeth, Bill Hawkes, Boguslaw Kostecki, David Daniels, David Woodcock, Dermot Crehan, Emlyn Singleton, Everton Nelson, Frank Schaefer, Helen Hathorn, Jackie Shave, Maciej Rakowski, Mark Berrow, Martin Loveday, Mary Scully, Miffy Hirsch, Patrick Kiernan, Patrick Lannigan, Perry Montague-Mason, Philip Dukes, Philippa Ibbotson, Rita Manning – strings (1, 9)
- Cathy Thompson – string arrangements (1, 9)
