= Marshall's House =

Studio album by John Squire
- Released: 9 February 2004
- Studio: Bryn Derwen Studios
- Genre: Rock
- Length: 35:51
- Label: North Country Records
- Producer: John Squire, Simon Dawson

John Squire chronology
Time Changes Everything (2002)	Marshall's House (2004)	Liam Gallagher John Squire (2024)

Professional ratings
Aggregate scores
Source	Rating
Metacritic	49/100
Review scores
Source	Rating
AllMusic	4/5 stars
Dotmusic	3/10
The Guardian	1/5 stars
The Independent	1/5 stars
Mojo	3.5/5 stars
Q	4/5 stars
Uncut	2/5 stars

Marshall's House is the second studio album by the English guitarist John Squire. It was released in 2004 on his own North Country Records label. It was Squire's last album for two decades, until 2024's eponymous album Liam Gallagher & John Squire.

Each song is inspired by, and shares its title with, a painting by Edward Hopper.

"Room In Brookyn" b/w "Nighthawks" was released as a single in the U.K.; the latter also shares its title with a Hopper painting but was omitted from regular editions of the album.

== Track listing ==
All tracks composed by John Squire

1. "Summertime" - 3:13
2. "Hotel Room" - 2:15
3. "Marshall's House" - 4:15
4. "Lighthouse and Buildings, Portland Head, Cape Elizabeth, Maine" - 2:02
5. "Cape Cod Morning" - 4:23
6. "People In the Sun" - 4:07
7. "Tables for Ladies" - 2:45
8. "Automat" - 3:08
9. "Yawl Riding a Swell" - 3:07
10. "Room In Brooklyn" - 2:40
11. "Gas" – 3:56

== Personnel ==
- John Squire - guitar, vocals
- George Vjestica - guitar, backing vocals
- Jonathan White - bass
- John Ellis - keyboards
- Luke Bullen - drums, percussion
