= Love Spreads =

1994 single by the Stone Roses

Single by the Stone Roses

from the album Second Coming
- B-side: "Your Star Will Shine"; "Breakout"; "Groove Harder"
- Released: 21 November 1994
- Genre: Alternative rock; blues rock
- Length: 5:46
- Label: Geffen
- Songwriter: John Squire
- Producer: Simon Dawson

The Stone Roses singles chronology
"I Am the Resurrection" (1992)	"Love Spreads" (1994)	"Ten Storey Love Song" (1995)

"Love Spreads" is a song by British alternative rock group The Stone Roses, released on 21 November 1994 by Geffen Records as the first single from their second album, Second Coming (1994). The record reached number two on the UK Singles Chart, the highest peak for any song by the band, as well as number 55 on the US Billboard Hot 100 Airplay chart and number 67 on the Canadian RPM 100 Hit Tracks chart. The single also reached the top 10 in Ireland and the top 20 in Sweden.

== Cover art ==
John Squire designed the "Love Spreads" cover, using a photograph of one of the four stone cherubs on the Newport Bridge in Newport, South Wales. The cherubs on the bridge are modelled after Newport's coat of arms, which contains a cherub with winged sea lions. The cherub design was subsequently used on many pieces of Second Coming merchandise.

== Lyrics and composition ==
"Love Spreads" is a blues rock song in D minor. Its lyrics are a telling of the Passion of Christ, reinterpreting Jesus as a black woman.

In 1995, guitarist John Squire said the lyrics were inspired by British author Rosalind Miles' 1988 book The Women's History of the World. The book examines the roles of women, their representation, and their power through history.

== Critical reception ==
Bobby Gillespie of Primal Scream hailed the song as "the greatest comeback single ever." In May 2007, NME magazine placed "Love Spreads" at number 44 in its list of the 50 Greatest Indie Anthems Ever and said it was the band at their "take no prisoners best". AllMusic called the song a "true classic".

== Music video ==
There are two music videos for "Love Spreads". The original UK version, directed by Mike Clark and the Stone Roses, consisted of home footage. There are scenes of Mani, Squire, and Brown dressed as a chicken, the devil, and Death respectively. These scenes were interspliced with hidden images.

Geffen and MTV were unsatisfied with the quality of the first video, so Steven Hanft at Propaganda Films directed a second video for American audiences.

== In popular culture ==
A re-recorded version of "Love Spreads" was used on The Help Album (a compilation of songs for the charity War Child). It was also used in the season 4 episode of CSI: Crime Scene Investigation, "Invisible Evidence" and in a season 5 episode of Entourage, "Return to Queens Boulevard." It also appeared in the season 2 episode of Severance, "Who Is Alive?"

The song is featured in the music video game Guitar Hero World Tour, appearing in the final bonus set in career mode. It is also available as a downloadable track for the music video game series Rock Band and is playable in Rock Band Track Pack: Classic Rock.

== Track listings ==
- 7-inch and cassette single
1. "Love Spreads" (LP version) – 5:46
2. "Your Star Will Shine" (LP version) – 2:56
- 12-inch single

A1. "Love Spreads" (LP version) – 5:46
A2. "Your Star Will Shine" (LP version) – 2:56
B1. "Breakout" – 6:04
B2. "Groove Harder" – 4:26

- CD single
1. "Love Spreads" (LP version) – 5:46
2. "Your Star Will Shine" (LP version) – 2:56
3. "Breakout" – 6:03

== Charts ==
=== Weekly charts ===
Chart (1994–1995)	Peak position
Australia (ARIA)	36
Canada Top Singles (RPM)	67
Europe (Eurochart Hot 100)	8
Europe (European Hit Radio)	33
Ireland (IRMA)	8
New Zealand (Recorded Music NZ)	23
Scottish Singles Sales (Official Charts)	1
Sweden (Sverigetopplistan)	13
UK Singles (Official Charts)	2
UK Rock & Metal (Official Charts)	4
UK Airplay (Music Week)	29
US Radio Songs (Billboard)	55
US Alternative Airplay (Billboard)	2
US Mainstream Rock (Billboard)	4

=== Year-end charts ===
Chart (1994)	Position
UK Singles (OCC)	96

Chart (1995)	Position
US Album Rock Tracks (Billboard)	26
US Modern Rock Tracks (Billboard)	30

== Certifications ==
Region	Certification	Certified units/sales
United Kingdom (BPI)	Gold	400,000^{‡}
^{‡} Sales+streaming figures based on certification alone.

== Release history ==
Region	Date	Format(s)	Label(s)	Ref.
Australia	21 November 1994	CD; cassette	Geffen	
United Kingdom	21 November 1994	7-inch vinyl; CD; cassette	Geffen	
United Kingdom	28 November 1994	12-inch vinyl	Geffen	
Japan	7 December 1994	CD	Geffen	
