= Stellify =

Single by Ian Brown

from the album My Way
- Released: 21 September 2009
- Recorded: 2009
- Genre: Alternative rock
- Label: Universal; Koch; Fiction
- Producer: Dave McCracken

Ian Brown singles chronology
"Sister Rose" (2007)	"Stellify" (2009)	"Just Like You" (2009)

"Stellify" is the first single from Ian Brown's sixth studio album My Way. It was the first time that Brown "sort of consciously sat down and decided to write a love song". The song was released on 21 September 2009. In an interview with XFM Manchester he shared that the song was originally written for Rihanna, for her upcoming studio album, but he realised he had created "a great sound" so claimed the track for himself. The song charted at No.31 in the UK and as of 2020, remains his last top 40 hit as a solo artist.

== Track listing ==
=== Download EP ===
1. "Stellify" (4:58)
2. "Crowning of the Poor" (3:18)
3. "For the Glory" (3:11)
4. "Marathon Man" (3:39)

=== 7″ ===
1. "Stellify" (4:58)
2. "Crowning of the Poor" (3:18)

=== Promo CD ===
1. "Stellify" (single edit) (3:32)
