= The Rub =

English rock band

- Origin: Whalley Range, Manchester, England
- Genres: Alternative rock
- Years active: 1998–2001
- Past members: Reni; Casey Longden; Neil Nisbet; Mik Grant

The Rub were an English rock band, formed in 1998 in Whalley Range, Manchester by former Stone Roses drummer Alan "Reni" Wren.

The band's line up featured Reni on vocals and lead guitar along with rhythm guitarist and backing vocalist Casey Longden, bassist and backing vocalist Neil Nisbet and drummer Mik Grant. Longden and Nisbet were from Manchester, and Grant from Greenock.

Initially called Hunkpapa, earlier incarnations featured former bandmate Pete Garner on bass and Happy Mondays percussionist Lee Mullen.

The band played several gigs in the UK during the spring of 2001, including Manchester University where they were introduced on stage by ex-Stone Roses bassist Mani. They split up prior to releasing any studio material.

The Rub were also a Los Angeles-based post-punk rock band on Happy Squid Records (www.HappySquid.com) that released two critically acclaimed studio albums, including 1987's "Bikini Gospel" LP, named by LA Weekly as a Top Ten Underground album of the year. The Rub has also been featured on compilation albums, and was one of the first alternative bands to release digital-only recordings. The band released singles in 2017 and is working on a new album to be released in 2027.
