= Remixes of the Spheres =

Remix album by Ian Brown
- Released: 26 November 2002
- Recorded: 2001–2002
- Genre: Alternative rock; Indie rock
- Length: 61:44
- Label: Universal
- Producer: James Lavelle

Ian Brown chronology
Music of the Spheres (2001)	Remixes of the Spheres (2002)	Solarized (2004)

Professional ratings
Review scores
Source	Rating
AllMusic	2/5 stars

Remixes of the Spheres is a collection of mixes, live versions and unreleased B-sides by former lead singer of the Stone Roses, Ian Brown. The album reworks many tracks from his third album, Music of the Spheres. UNKLE, Nightmares on Wax and the Freelance Hellraiser were among the collaborators on this album.

== Track listing ==
1. "F.E.A.R. (UNKLE Mix)" – 5:55
2. "Northern Lights (The Freelance Hellraiser Mix)" – 5:42
3. "The Gravy Train (N.O.W. Mix)" – 5:00
4. "Forever and a Day (Cedarblue Mix)" – 4:12
5. "Shadow of a Saint (The Boy Bierton Mix)" – 6:26
6. "Superstar" – 4:50
7. "My Star (2002)" – 4:05
8. "Hear No See No Speak No (Album Version)" – 5:25
9. "Cokane in My Brain (DJ Mek Nuremberg Scratch Mix)" – 1:45
10. "The Gravy Train (N.O.W. Instrumental)" – 5:07
11. "Stardust (Instrumental)" – 4:38
12. "El Mundo Pequeno (Live Acoustic Version)" – 2:48
13. "F.E.A.R. (UNKLE Instrumental)" – 5:51
