= My Way (Ian Brown album) =

Studio album by Ian Brown
- Released: 28 September 2009
- Recorded: Battery Studios, Manchester
- Genre: Alternative rock
- Length: 43:07
- Label: Fiction Records
- Producer: Dave McCracken

Ian Brown chronology
The World is Yours (2007)	My Way (2009)	Ripples (2019)

Singles from My Way
- 1. "Stellify" Released: 21 September 2009; 2. "Just Like You" Released: 30 November 2009

Professional ratings
Aggregate scores
Source	Rating
Metacritic	72/100
Review scores
Source	Rating
Clash	(6/10)
The Daily Telegraph	2/5 stars
Drowned in Sound	(7/10)
entertainment.ie	2/5 stars
The Guardian	3/5 stars
NME	(8/10)
Slant Magazine	2.5/5 stars
The Times	2/5 stars
Uncut	3/5 stars

My Way is the sixth studio album by British artist Ian Brown. The album was released on 28 September 2009. The album's lead single "Stellify" was released on 21 September 2009. In an interview with XFM Manchester he claimed that the song was originally written for Rihanna, but he realised he had created "a great sound" so claimed the track for himself.

The second single "Just Like You" was released on 30 November 2009. This was Brown's final album for a decade, until his comeback with his 2019 album, Ripples.

== Recording ==
My Way was inspired by Michael Jackson's Thriller, with Brown noting that "we mastered it on the day that Michael Jackson died (too), so I'm taking that as a good omen."

== Track listing ==
1. "Stellify" – 4:57
2. "Crowning of the Poor" – 3:18
3. "Just Like You" – 3:22
4. "In the Year 2525" (Zager and Evans cover) – 2:52
5. "Always Remember Me" – 4:49
6. "Vanity Kills" – 3:34
7. "For the Glory" – 3:11
8. "Marathon Man" – 3:39
9. "Own Brain" – 2:56
10. "Laugh Now" – 3:53
11. "By All Means Necessary" – 3:42
12. "So High" – 2:54
