= Nigel Ipinson =

British keyboardist and pastor (born 1970)

- Born: Nigel Ipinson-Fleming; 1970 (age 55–56); Liverpool, England
- Genres: Pop, rock, jazz
- Occupation: Keyboardist
- Instruments: Keyboards, piano

Nigel Ipinson-Fleming (born 1970, Liverpool, England) is a British keyboardist. He has played, written and produced for several acts including Orchestral Manoeuvres in the Dark (OMD), the Stone Roses and Ian Brown.

== Career ==
Ipinson-Fleming started playing piano when he was three years old. He first appeared in the group Juvenile Jazz, which won a 1987 BBC TV talent contest on Saturday Superstore called "Search for a Superstar", and issued a self-titled album the same year. Ipinson later played on the OMD albums Sugar Tax (1991) and Liberator (1993), and co-wrote the band's 1996 single, "Walking on the Milky Way".

Ipinson-Fleming assisted the Stone Roses as keyboardist throughout the band's Second Coming Tour of 1995 as well as on festival gigs in the summer of 1996, and appeared on some studio recordings by the group. Ipinson wrote songs for former Stone Roses singer Ian Brown, and also played on other tracks from the singer's debut album Unfinished Monkey Business (1998). In 1999, Ipinson-Fleming became the Managing Director of UKChurches, a multimedia solutions company. He has also performed and written for Hot Chocolate and The Gospel Music Workshop of America, and has worked with many education bodies including St Mary Redcliffe School, Bristol Cathedral School, The Cabot Learning Federation, and Christchurch School Clifton.
