= Second Coming (The Stone Roses album) =

Studio album by the Stone Roses
- Released: 5 December 1994
- Recorded: 1992–1994
- Genres: Alternative rock; blues rock; funk rock
- Length: 66:25
- Label: Geffen
- Producers: Simon Dawson, Paul Schroeder

The Stone Roses chronology
Turns into Stone (1992)	Second Coming (1994)	The Complete Stone Roses (1995)

Singles from Second Coming
- 1. "Love Spreads" Released: 21 November 1994; 2. "Ten Storey Love Song" Released: 27 February 1995; 3. "Begging You" Released: 30 October 1995

Second Coming is the second and final studio album by the English rock band the Stone Roses, released through Geffen Records on 5 December 1994 in the UK. It was recorded at Forge Studios in Oswestry, Shropshire, and Rockfield Studios near Monmouth, Wales, between 1992 and 1994. It went platinum in the UK, sold over 1 million copies worldwide, and was dedicated to Philip Hall, the band's publicist, who died of cancer in 1993.

Although the band eventually reformed in 2011, and subsequently released two new singles in 2016, it did not materialise into a new studio album, as the band disbanded again the following year in 2017, and bassist Gary Mounfield died in 2025.

== Background ==
The second album by the Manchester four-piece suffered greatly at the time from the sheer weight of expectation generated by the 5½ years since the band's eponymous debut, and the band's withdrawal from the live arena for 4½ of those years. In this time the band were unable to release any new material due to their severance lawsuit against Silverstone records, which led to a feeling of malaise in the band and their waning fanbase who had grown tired of the protracted wait between releases. It was also during the sessions for the album that lead singer Ian Brown developed an addiction to cocaine, which affected his vocal performance considerably.There had been speculation in the British press that the high expectations from their debut record had left the band "paralyzed with self-doubt," according to LA Times pop music critic Robert Hilburn. In addition, the Stone Roses returned to a changed musical environment, competing with a new generation of Britpop bands such as the band Oasis who were widely regarded to have been passed the torch by earlier bands such as the Stone Roses. Many in the wider public had expected the band to continue their successful niche of intricate vocal harmonies and affected guitar parts and were blindsided by the band's heavier guitar driven sound. Nevertheless, the album reached number 4 on the UK Albums Chart.

Three singles ("Love Spreads", "Ten Storey Love Song," and "Begging You") from the album were released in the UK.

== Artwork ==
The album cover, created by Squire, features a dark, fabric-like collage of photographs, artwork, text, and symbols. Most notable is a stone cherub, taken from a photograph of those found on the Newport Town Bridge, smoking a cigarette. The original photograph was later used for the "Love Spreads" single and featured in the monochrome CD.

The liner notes feature black and white photographs of the band members as children.

== Critical reception ==
Professional ratings
Review scores
Source	Rating
AllMusic	3/5 stars
The Encyclopedia of Popular Music	3/5 stars
Entertainment Weekly	B−
The Guardian	4/4 stars
Los Angeles Times	3/4 stars
NME	6/10
Q	2/5 stars
The Rolling Stone Album Guide	2/5 stars
Select	4/5
Spin	6/10

Second Coming was released to generally mixed reviews in the UK and US. Rolling Stone awarded the record two out of five stars, calling its songs "tuneless retro psychedelic grooves bloated to six-plus minutes in length." Robert Hilburn of the Los Angeles Times was more positive, praising John Squire's "inspired guitar work" and concluding that "while the album's impact is undercut by some tunes that seem little more than fragments, the standouts offer a soulful earnestness as they speak of the search for salvation and comfort amid the tension and uncertainty of contemporary life."

Select ranked the album at number twelve in its end-of-year list of the 50 best albums of 1995.

== Track listing ==
All tracks are written by John Squire, except where noted.

No.	Title	Writer(s)	Length
1.	"Breaking into Heaven"		11:21
2.	"Driving South"		5:09
3.	"Ten Storey Love Song"		4:29
4.	"Daybreak"	Ian Brown, Gary Mounfield, Squire, Alan Wren	6:33
5.	"Your Star Will Shine"		2:59
6.	"Straight to the Man"	Brown	3:15
7.	"Begging You"	Squire, Brown	4:56
8.	"Tightrope"		4:28
9.	"Good Times"		5:40
10.	"Tears"		6:50
11.	"How Do You Sleep"		4:59
12.	"Love Spreads"		5:46
Total length:			66:25

Hidden track
No.	Title	Writer(s)	Length
1.	"The Foz"	Brown, Mounfield, Squire, Wren	6:26

== Personnel ==
The Stone Roses

- Ian Brown – lead vocals, harmonica, recording of running water on "Breaking into Heaven"
- John Squire – electric and acoustic guitars, vocals on "Tightrope," backing vocals on "How Do You Sleep," recording of jets on "Begging You," collage
- Mani – bass guitar
- Reni – drums, backing vocals, vocals on "Tightrope," recording of running water on "Breaking into Heaven"

Technical personnel

- Simon Dawson – keyboards, Jew's harp on "Straight to the Man," castanets, Wurlitzer electric piano on "Straight to the Man" and "Tears," acoustic piano on "How Do You Sleep" and "Love Spreads," production, engineering on tracks 1, 2, 5, 6, 9, 12
- Paul Schroeder – production on tracks 1, 2, 3, 6, 7, 9, 10, 11, engineering on tracks 1, 2, 6, 9
- John Leckie – partly responsible for recording on tracks 3, 7, 11, recording on "Breaking into Heaven" intro
- Mark Tolle – initial recording on tracks 4, 8, 10
- Al "Bongo" Shaw – initial recording on tracks 4, 8, 10
- Nick Brine – assistant engineering; tambourine on "Love Spreads"

== Charts ==
Chart performance for Second Coming
Chart (1994–1995)	Peak position
Australian Albums (ARIA)	17
Austrian Albums (Ö3 Austria)	35
Canada Top Albums/CDs (RPM)	24
Dutch Albums (Album Top 100)	61
German Albums (Offizielle Top 100)	57
New Zealand Albums (RMNZ)	38
Swedish Albums (Sverigetopplistan)	26
Swiss Albums (Schweizer Hitparade)	35
UK Albums (OCC)	4
US Billboard 200	47

== Certifications ==
Certifications for The Second Coming
Region	Certification	Certified units/sales
United Kingdom (BPI)	2× Platinum	600,000^{*}
^{*} Sales figures based on certification alone.
