= Solarized (album) =

Studio album by Ian Brown
- Released: 13 September 2004
- Genre: Alternative rock
- Length: 39:07
- Label: Fiction
- Producers: Ian Brown; Dave McCracken

Ian Brown chronology
Remixes of the Spheres (2002)	Solarized (2004)	The Greatest (2005)

Singles from Solarized
- 1. "Keep What Ya Got" Released: 20 September 2004; 2. "Time Is My Everything" Released: 17 January 2005

Professional ratings
Aggregate scores
Source	Rating
Metacritic	61/100
Review scores
Source	Rating
AllMusic	3.5/5 stars
The Guardian	3/5 stars
PopMatters	(Favorable)

Solarized is the fourth studio album released by Ian Brown, the former lead singer of the Stone Roses. The album was first released in the United Kingdom on 13 September 2004.

== Background ==
The album was the first album release on the revived Polydor imprint Fiction Records.

Canadian and Australian releases did not feature "Happy Ever After". The North American edition of Solarized contains an exclusive U.S. bonus track called "Lovebug".

The first single, "Keep What Ya Got", is a reworked version of Noel Gallagher's 1998 instrumental solo track "Teotihuacan", which appeared in the end credits of the 1998 film The X-Files, and was included on the official soundtrack album. Gallagher also appears in the music video of the single.

The song "Happy Ever After" was used in an episode of Top Gear during the review of the 2007 Jaguar XK. It has also been used in the series Ramsay's Kitchen Nightmares and for the adverts of Law & Order: UK.

Unlike his previous, and subsequent albums, Solarized was not originally released on vinyl, but in April 2016, it was finally released on a limited run of 2000 vinyl copies as part of Record Store Day.

== Track listing ==
1. "Longsight M13" (Ian Brown & Aziz Ibrahim) – 3:12
2. "Time Is My Everything" (Brown & Tim Hutton) – 3:52
3. "Destiny or Circumstance" (Brown) – 2:35
4. "Upside Down" (Brown) – 3:12
5. "Solarized" (Brown & Ibrahim) – 3:47
6. "The Sweet Fantastic" (Brown, Charlie Waddington & Dan Bierton) – 3:52
7. "Keep What Ya Got" (feat. Noel Gallagher) (Brown & Noel Gallagher) – 4:28
8. "Home Is Where the Heart Is" (Brown) – 3:06
9. "One Way Ticket to Paradise" (Brown & Ibrahim) – 4:15
10. "Kiss Ya Lips (No I.D.)" (Brown & Darren Moss) – 3:56
11. "Happy Ever After" (Brown, Ibrahim & Inder "Goldfinger" Matharu) – 2:46
12. "Lovebug" [US and Japan bonus track] (Brown & Ibrahim) – 3:03

== Charts ==
=== Weekly charts ===
Chart (2004)	Peak position
Irish Albums (IRMA)	14
Scottish Albums (Official Charts)	5
UK Albums (Official Charts)	7

=== Year-end charts ===
Chart (2004)	Position
UK Albums (OCC)	200
