= F.E.A.R. (song) =

Single by Ian Brown

from the album Music of the Spheres
- Released: 17 September 2001
- Genre: Alternative rock; trip hop
- Length: 4:29
- Label: Polydor
- Songwriters: Ian Brown; Dave McCracken; Dave Colquhoun

Ian Brown singles chronology
"Thriller" / "Billie Jean" (2000)	"F.E.A.R." (2001)	"Whispers" (2002)

Music video
- "F.E.A.R." on YouTube

"F.E.A.R." is the first single from Ian Brown's third studio album, Music of the Spheres. Released on 17 September 2001, it reached number 13 on the UK Singles Chart and was both a commercial and critical success. In late 2002, it won a Muso Award for best single, as voted by his peers in the British music industry. In October 2011, NME placed it at number 67 on its list "150 Best Tracks of the Past 15 Years".

== Influences ==
The song incorporates a lyric scheme where each verse forms the acrostic "F.E.A.R." (for example, "For each a road" and "Fallen empires are ruling"). In an interview with Clash magazine, Brown said that a main influence for "F.E.A.R." was The Autobiography of Malcolm X, which preached the study of etymology, so that one could have "control over people through the use of language." He then created hundreds of acrostics for the word "fear".

Brown revisited the concept in the title of the Solarized track, "Time Is My Everything", which is often abbreviated by with the acronym "T.I.M.E." on concert setlists.

Remixed and instrumental versions of "F.E.A.R." also appeared in the remix album, Remixes of the Spheres. A 30-second clip of the instrumental version appears at the end of the LP version of Music of the Spheres; this is a tribute to Marvin Gaye's What's Going On album, which also featured a clip of the lead track at the end of the album.

== Music video ==
The music video for "F.E.A.R." marked Brown's directorial debut. It featured footage of the singer slowly riding a bicycle through the busy streets of Soho and Chinatown in London, which was then reversed to give the impression of being ridden backwards. The route followed was from Berwick Street to Gerrard Street.

== Track listing ==
CD: Polydor / 587 284-2 (UK)
No.	Title	Writer(s)	Length
1.	"F.E.A.R."	Ian Brown; Dave McCracken; Dave Colquhoun	4:29
2.	"F.E.A.R." (with Dann)	Brown; McCracken; Colquhoun	4:05
3.	"Hear No See No Speak No"	Brown; McCracken; Mark Sayfritz	5:24
4.	"F.E.A.R." (CD-ROM video)

Cassette: Polydor / 587 284-4 (UK)
No.	Title	Writer(s)	Length
1.	"F.E.A.R."	Brown; McCracken; Colquhoun	4:29
2.	"F.E.A.R." (with Dann)	Brown; McCracken; Colquhoun	4:05

7-inch: Polydor / 587 284-7 (UK)
No.	Title	Writer(s)	Length
1.	"F.E.A.R."	Brown; McCracken; Colquhoun	4:29
2.	"F.E.A.R." (instrumental)	Brown; McCracken; Colquhoun	4:29

== Charts ==
Weekly chart performance for "F.E.A.R."
Chart (2001)	Peak position
Ireland (IRMA)	19
Netherlands (Single Top 100)	94
UK Singles (Official Charts)	13

== Certifications ==
Region	Certification	Certified units/sales
United Kingdom (BPI)	Gold	400,000^{‡}
^{‡} Sales+streaming figures based on certification alone.

== Release history ==
Region	Date	Format(s)	Label(s)	Catalog	Ref.
United Kingdom	17 September 2001	CD	Polydor	587 284-2	
United Kingdom	17 September 2001	Cassette	Polydor	587 284-4	
United Kingdom	17 September 2001	7-inch vinyl	Polydor	587 284-7	
United Kingdom	2001	CD	Polydor	IBPRO102 (Note: Promotional copy with only one track, "F.E.A.R.".)	
Netherlands	2004	12-inch vinyl	White label	—N/a	

== Usage in media ==
A remixed version of the song by Unkle was used as the menu music in the video game F1 2010. The song was used in pre-launch music video promos for CNX, a short-lived British television channel, launched in 2002 and a sister channel to Cartoon Network.

== Other versions ==
On 9 October 2012, the English singer-songwriter George Michael performed "F.E.A.R." during his concert at the Manchester Arena in Manchester, as part of the Symphonica Tour. Introducing the song to the audience, Michael said, "It's a truly, truly cool record, so I do feel like a dad getting up and wedding singing. But I really wanted to pay tribute to [Brown]. I think he's a great writer."
