= Golden Greats (Ian Brown album) =

Studio album by Ian Brown
- Released: 8 November 1999
- Genres: Alternative rock; indie rock; electronic rock; alternative dance
- Length: 45:02
- Labels: Polydor; Interscope, Koch (US)
- Producer: Ian Brown

Ian Brown chronology
Unfinished Monkey Business (1998)	Golden Greats (1999)	Music of the Spheres (2001)

Singles from Golden Greats
- 1. "Love Like a Fountain" Released: 25 October 1999; 2. "Dolphins Were Monkeys" Released: 7 February 2000; 3. "Golden Gaze" Released: 5 June 2000

Professional ratings
Aggregate scores
Source	Rating
Metacritic	69/100
Review scores
Source	Rating
AllMusic	4/5 stars
The Austin Chronicle	4/5 stars
The Guardian	4.5/5 stars
The Independent	(Mixed)
NME	4.5/5 stars
Rolling Stone	2/5 stars
Yahoo Music	8/10 stars

Golden Greats is the second studio album released by Ian Brown, first made famous by his role as frontman in the Stone Roses. It was described by NME as "a left-field masterpiece and Brown's best work for a decade", Golden Greats showcases a diverse usage of instruments including strings, mellotron and organs. A number of the tracks on the album were written by Brown whilst he was imprisoned for two months following a fracas with a flight attendant.

Track 10, "Babasónicos", is the name of an actual Argentine band that collaborated with Brown on the song.

== Track listing ==
1. "Gettin' High" (Ian Brown, Aziz Ibrahim) – 4:01
2. "Love Like a Fountain" (Brown) – 5:14
3. "Free My Way" (Brown) – 4:19
4. "Set My Baby Free" (Brown, Aniff Akinola) – 4:26
5. "So Many Soldiers" (Brown, Dave McCracken, Tim Wills) – 5:16
6. "Golden Gaze" (Brown, Simon Wolstencroft, Mike Bennett, McCracken, Wills) – 3:56
7. "Dolphins Were Monkeys" (Brown, McCracken, Wills) – 5:06
8. "Neptune" (Brown, Sylvan Richardson) – 3:32
9. "First World" (Brown, Ibrahim) – 5:07
10. "Babasónicos" (Brown, Diego Tuñon, Walter Kebleris) – 4:05

"Gettin' High" includes an excerpt of "Morrassi" performed by Aziz Ibrahim

2005 US release bonus tracks

11. "Dolphins Were Monkeys" (Single Version) (Brown, McCracken, Wills) – 2:55
12. "Dolphins Were Monkeys" (Unkle Vs. South Remix) (Brown, McCracken, Wills) – 7:09
13. "Billie Jean" (Michael Jackson) – 3:36
14. "Thriller" (Rod Temperton) – 3:23
15. "Love Like a Fountain (Infected By Scourge of the Earth)" (Brown) – 3:35

== Personnel ==
- Ian Brown – vocals, keyboards, drums, arrangements
- Aziz Ibrahim – guitar
- Tim Wills – electric guitar, piano
- Sylvan Richardson – electric guitar, bass guitar, keyboards, cello
- Carlos Hernán "Carca" Carcacha – guitar
- Dave McCracken – keyboards, programming
- Aniff Akinola – keyboards, drums
- Simon Wolstencroft – drums
- Dan Bierton – drums
- Diego Castellano – drums
- Inder "Goldfinger" Matharu – percussion
- Audrey Riley – cello
- Uma-T – harmonica
- DJ Peggyn – sound Fx

Technical

- Ian Wright – cover portrait
