= Reni (musician) =

English drummer

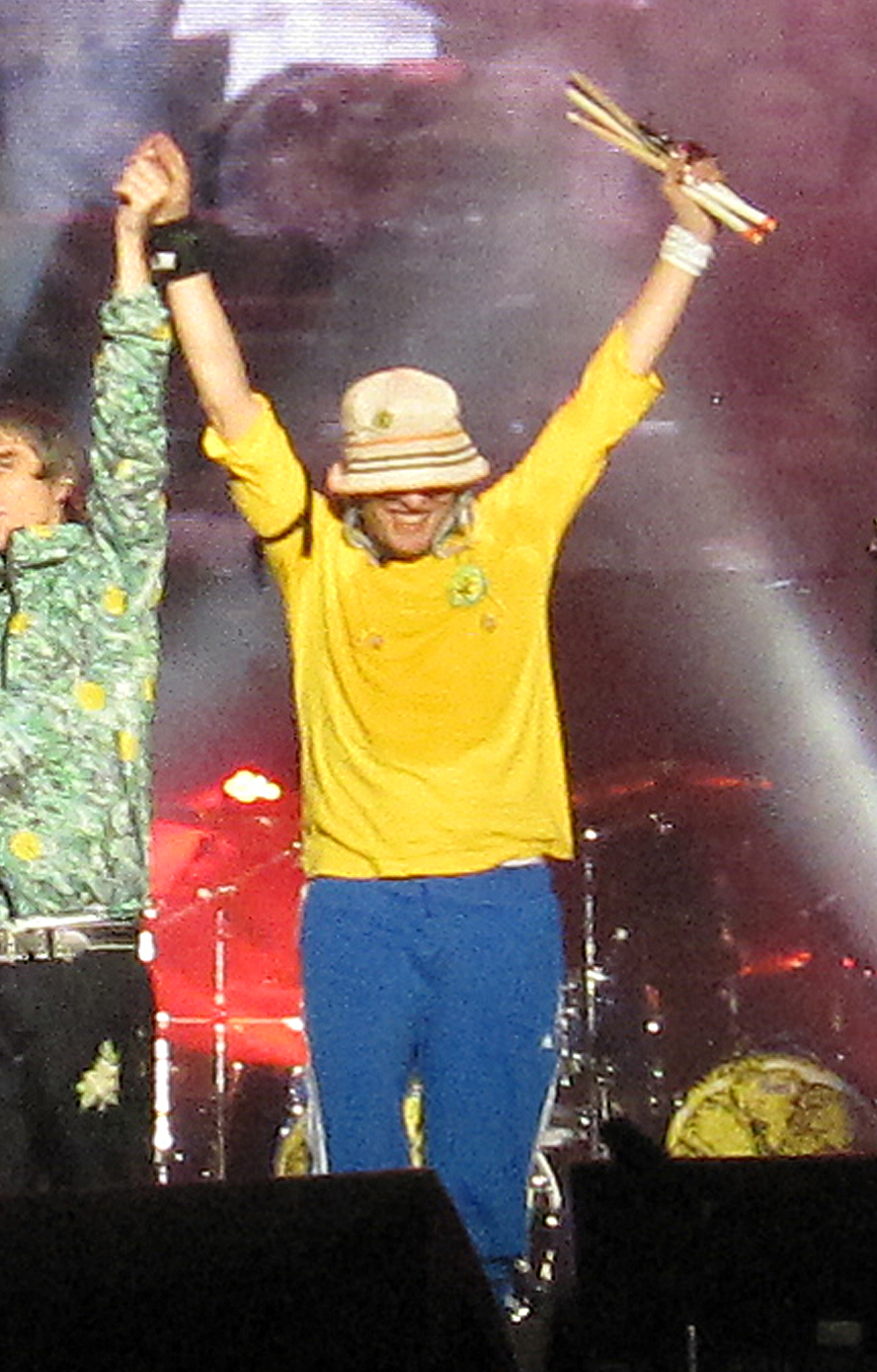
- Reni with The Stone Roses in 2012

Background information
- Born: Alan John Wren; 10 April 1964 (age 62); Manchester, England
- Genres: Alternative rock, Madchester
- Occupations: Musician, songwriter
- Instruments: Drums, percussion, vocals, guitar
- Years active: 1984–2001, 2011–2017
- Labels: Silvertone, Geffen
- Formerly of: The Stone Roses, The Rub

Alan John "Reni" Wren (born 10 April 1964) is an English retired rock drummer and former member of The Stone Roses.

His laid-back style of complex, off-beat rhythms was influential in bringing about the blend of indie and dance music which formed much of the Madchester sound centred on Manchester. He is considered by many musicians, producers, and journalists to be the best drummer of his generation.

During his time with The Stone Roses, Wren could be easily identified by the now iconic bucket hat he often wore. Following his mysterious departure from the band in March 1995, he fronted The Rub as singer and guitarist from 1998 to 2001 and played several low-key shows but split without releasing any material.

After a 10 year industry hiatus, he re-emerged on the music scene with the reformation of The Stone Roses in October 2011. After the band's final show at Hampden Park in Glasgow, Scotland, in June 2017, he returned to private life and runs a property business with his wife.

== Early career ==
Born in Manchester, Wren grew up in Gorton as the second of six siblings and attended Egerton Park Arts College.

He taught himself drums in his youth as, due to his family situation, he was often around musical instruments in a pub environment. He also plays the guitar, bass and piano. John Robb, in his 1997 book The Stone Roses and the Resurrection of British Pop, said Wren could "play guitar almost as well as he plays drums," However, it was his drumming abilities that made him stand out. Whilst growing up, "...the local kids thought Reni was a freak because he was such an amazing drummer, a total natural. Reni didn't care. He was already jamming along to anything and anybody."

He was already in two bands before he joined The Stone Roses, but friend Simon Wright's successful audition for AC/DC in 1984 may have prompted him towards more serious ambitions.

== The Stone Roses ==
Wren joined the Stone Roses in May 1984 after seeing an advertisement the band had placed in Manchester's A1 Music shop on New Wakefield Street (which then became "academy of sound" then turned into the Soundcontrol music venue). He ripped it off the wall in order to make sure only he would get an audition, which occurred in what was at the time Decibel Studios to the north of the city centre. This was a rehearsal studio and required the band to carry Wren's drum kit up three flights of stairs, before running through early songs "Nowhere Fast", "All Stitched Up" and "Mission Impossible". Andy Couzens, then the band's second guitarist, later recalled this first rehearsal with their new-found 20-year-old drummer: "We never discussed it, we knew he was in! He was fucking amazing! What a drummer."

The band's first live show with Wren occurred at an anti-heroin gig in London, which was being hosted by Pete Townshend. This unexpected encounter concluded with The Who star asking the band whether he could use their drummer for his set - the band agreed, which led to Wren performing "Pictures of Lily" and other Who songs.

The band's first bassist, Pete Garner, noted in a 2012 interview for Simon Spence's biography The Stone Roses - War and Peace: "I stood on the side of the stage going 'Oh fuck, he’s going to join the Who now. First gig and we’ve lost him.' That was pretty surreal. I believe the previous gig Townshend had done was some massive stadium on The Who farewell tour ... and then he’d come back to do this charity gig." Andy Couzens stated: "At that time Reni was awe-inspiring. To play with him made us sound phenomenal; he was just this force. Just to watch him play was inspirational. That's what got Pete Townshend that night. He was inspired by what he'd seen." Despite the band's fears, Wren turned down Townshend's offer to play on his solo albums in favour of continuing with the Stone Roses.

His first career with the band would go on to span over a decade, during which time he performed on the albums Garage Flower (the band's abandoned debut album from 1985), the much-celebrated eponymous debut (1989), and Second Coming (1994), as well as dozens of singles and unreleased songs.

== Playing style ==
In his early years with the band, whose songs at the time were inspired by punk and post-punk, Wren's drumming style was characterised by the energy from influences such as Keith Moon - Andy Couzens mentioned he was "like ten Keith Moons in one." Due to his showmanship and natural flair, Manchester music scene regulars such as Martin Hannett noted many people were attending the band's early gigs just to see Wren play. Howard Jones, a director at Factory Records, said of a performance on 15 November 1984: "Reni was out of this world. The way he played, his facial expressions, his finishing, how he'd kill a cymbal once he'd hit it, he'd got total natural technique."

As the band's music progressed, marked by the release of the second single "Sally Cinnamon" in 1987, his playing style made use of a three-piece kit and the additional complement of his backing vocals on the majority of new songs. His minimised kit consisted of "a mixture of Ludwig, vintage, and a big expensive Sonor snare drum", which were all painted with John Squire's Jackson Pollock inspired art style. Wren's use of a smaller kit did not limit his range, with a new focus on a jazz-tinged, but ultimately rock-based, playing style. His busy use of the high-hat, snare, and solitary tom-tom created a complex sound which helped to define the band's significant musical shift.

"Elephant Stone", released in 1988 as the band's third single, was viewed as an ideal opportunity to highlight Wren's talent, as Brown later said: "We wanted people to hear what he could do." The drummer's focus on a propulsive tom-tom beat showcased his ability to create innovative drum rhythms, but was also in line with the burgeoning dance music scene of the day. Peter Hook of New Order produced the song in Cheadle Hulme, Stockport and has since said that Wren remains one of the best rock drummers he ever worked with: "Reni's drumming lent such a character and identity to the songs. Ian and John had got it with the melodies and lyrics but they were lucky to get Reni because he took them from being a traditional, normal rock band into the stratosphere with other great groups."

By the time of the Second Coming rehearsals, in the early 1990s, Wren adapted his style further. Guitarist John Squire, becoming increasingly inspired by Led Zeppelin, led the band in a new musical direction, prompting Wren to adopt a blues-rock approach, adding in extra tom-toms for a style analogous to John Bonham. Ian Brown said of early studio time: "When we started recording we had Reni playing the drums for 40 minutes and it was out of this world. I remember John Leckie turning around with a big beam on his face and saying, 'Can't this be the album?'" His playing on the songs "Love Spreads" and "Daybreak" were particularly praised for their high-quality and complexity, whilst his many long jamming sessions with Mani and Squire, plus several drum solos, also became available through bootlegs.

For the majority of his career, Wren has preferred the use of matched grip, although around 1990, in live television performances of "One Love" and "Fools Gold" he used traditional grip. He can also be seen in rehearsal recordings following the band's reformation using the former and latter interchangeably.

Of his drumming style, in 2004 Rhythm Magazine commented that Wren was "funkier and more subtle than any drummer in the genre [indie] had ever been" and he was, "economical, soulful, and inventive". Rhythm labelled him a drummer hero, stating: "you know him best by his ability to always play it cooler than cool".

== Live performances ==
During the Stone Roses' live performances, Wren's energetic drumming ensured that his reputation grew rapidly and sparked regular praise from the music press, fans, and peers. The Charlatans supported the Stone Roses in the late 1980s and its drummer, Jon Brookes, had observed Wren's playing closely: "He never pounded the drums, he used to caress them and get them to sing, he was that kind of drummer. It was great to just watch him, very poetic, beautiful motion, very light touch, at the same time very musical. And he was singing as well, these beautiful melodies, it was unbelievable."

The music press had also been documenting the drummer's appeal. A review of the band's famous 1989 Blackpool gig stated he was a "spectacular, slipshod blur of energy", whilst the NME noted of a Parisian performance: "Drummer Reni is magnificent. In Amsterdam, I’d watched him soundcheck for an hour on his own, slapping 17 shades of shining shite out of his kit for the sheer unbridled joy of playing."

In addition to his drumming, many fans also found his backing harmonies to be an integral part of the band's music. Described in John Robb's biography of The Stone Roses as "the voice of an angel", listening to their debut album, and live shows such as Blackpool's Empress Ballroom (1989), Glasgow Green (1990) and Manchester's Heaton Park (2012) overtly display his vocal range.

== 1995–2011: The Rub and industry hiatus ==
In 1995, Wren was the first member of the classic Stone Roses line-up to leave the band, with much mystery surrounding his exit. In Simon Spence's The Stone Roses: War and Peace (2012), it was suggested arguments with Brown and frustration with Squire's increasingly insular musical direction angered the drummer. Wren began missing recording sessions to spend time with his young family and often arrived in a dressing gown to the sessions he did attend. A statement was published in NME on 5 April 1995, announcing his immediate departure. After his exit, the band continued with Robbie Maddix as drummer, but broke up in 1996.

Little was heard of Wren in the 16 years which followed. His drumming was long credited on the Ian Brown track "Can't See Me", although Brown later acknowledged the drum loop was a sample Roses bassist Mani had uncovered and not Wren.

In 1998, he formed the short-lived band The Rub, its name inspired by a soliloquy from Hamlet, with Casey Longdon (rhythm guitar), Neil Nisbet (bass) and Mick Grant (drums). Wren wrote the songs, sang lead vocals, and played bass and lead guitar. During the Rub's brief history, it enjoyed strong support from many Stone Roses fans and the press, although The Guardian wrote that "although it's good to have Wren back and clearly enjoying himself, it's a great pity that this world-class percussionist is not behind a drum stool." In 2001, the band split having released no material.

In 2005, Wren gave his first broadcast interview in 10 years to BBC GMR, along with ex-Roses bassist Mani, on the Manchester Music Show whilst attending a concert by the Coral. It was reported in early 2007 that Fun Lovin Criminals had asked Reni to become their drummer. He did not respond and nothing became of the rumour. In June 2008, in an interview with Teletext's Planet Sound, Mani revealed that Wren had formed a new band with an unnamed member of Black Grape, but gave no other details. Nothing emerged from this rumour.

In May 2009, on the 20th anniversary of the Stone Roses' eponymous debut album, Wren and the three other band members sanctioned the release of rare demos and unreleased material. In an exclusive book included with the collector's edition, whilst Ian Brown and Mani included extensive written accounts of their experiences in the Stone Roses, Wren supplied only a drawing and poem.

Prior to the band's 2011 reunion, in 2009 those who worked with Wren had high praise for the drummer in interviews conducted for the 20th anniversary. Ian Brown said "He’d have been like Gene Krupa or Buddy Rich. He'd fill the Apollo up now if he just set up his drum kit in there and played." Mani said "He was an amazing drummer. He was that good, he could do anything. He’s done gigs with one arm – and he played with one arm it was as good as two! The guy is a total genius, a proper fucking one-off you know?" He also provided an explanation for Wren's disappearance from the music scene: "I think what it is with Reni is the fact he doesn't think of it [drumming for another band] as better than he has done before."

John Leckie (the band's producer on the eponymous debut album) provided an insight into Wren's drum kit and playing style: "Reni just had a collection of drums – you can't say Reni plays a lovely drum kit – every tom, cymbal and drum is from a different kit. That's how he makes it up. He's such a great player. When I listen to him play, I just sort of think, "Fuck! No-one else plays like that!" Pete Garner: "Reni was so much better than any drummer in a little band, like another level. He’d learned his craft. Everyone else I knew in bands had started like we did and you work at it, but he was already .... He’d been doing gigs when he was a kid. Those early gigs basically people would just lock onto him, it was pretty mindblowing really. Now, he’s gone down in history as the hat and the Fools Gold riff but most people have not seen Reni drum like he can drum. Later on in the band he toned it down. Those early gigs it was always him people would talk about afterwards, 'Where did you find that fucking drummer?’" John Robb: "The best drummer of his generation. I’ve never seen anyone who could play drums like that – the talk in the early days was often about Reni – "check out the amazing drummer" hipsters would say and he always delivered. If the Roses ever reformed it would be a buzz just to see him play those drums again – dextrous, fluid and exuberant – he could hit hard like a rock drummer but also had a real swing and that infectious energy."

In a press conference on 18 October 2011, Wren, along with the other members of The Stone Roses, announced the band would be reforming for three "homecoming" gigs at Heaton Park, Manchester on 29 and 30 June and 1 July 2012. These dates were part of a Reunion Tour.

== 2011 reunion to the present day ==
On 23 May 2012, Wren played the drums in public for the first time in 17 years. This was at a secret gig in Warrington, a warm-up show before the band's full world tour. For his second career with the band, his kit now consists of two bass drums (with an image of a lemon on each bass drum - a reference to the band's eponymous debut album), with a greater number of tom-toms and cymbals than during his original run with the band.

The Stone Roses completed 30 gigs across the world in 2012 and the band continued to tour in 2013. A documentary film from that year showcasing the band's reformation, The Stone Roses: Made of Stone, directed by Shane Meadows premiered in Manchester's Victoria Warehouse on 30 May 2013.

In May and June 2016, following a brief hiatus, The Stone Roses released the new singles "All For One" and "Beautiful Thing", marking Wren's first new contributions to music since 2001. The band also announced concerts at the Etihad Stadium, which was followed by a wider tour of the world. Media outlets such as The Guardian continued to praise the drummer. After the band's first performance at the Etihad Stadium, the broadsheet newspaper stated: "The Stone Roses must not let Reni leave again". On its music blog, the paper explained: "On the face of it, the drummer is the most obviously replaceable component of a band but while fans are divided over the merits of a live Led Zeppelin without John Bonham, or Black Sabbath minus Bill Ward, the idea of a Reni-free Roses is untenable."

It added: "The man Pete Townshend once hailed as 'the most natural drummer I’ve seen since Keith Moon' has been the individual delight of the last week’s gigs. With an extra bass drum, what look like new teeth and a grin that never leaves his face, Reni has regained his youthful pomp and is playing as well as ever. His backing singing and those trademark funky grooves are powering the band with a gusto that they haven’t had in years."

Once again, the band briefly toured in early 2017 with the final show playing at Glasgow in June. During the gig, singer Brown made a comment which suggested the band will not be playing any further shows. The band's biographer, John Robb, told the NME: "It’s not official 100% confirmed that they’ve stopped, but it looks like they have, doesn’t it?" Of Wren, he added: "To me, the greatest tragedy is that if they have stopped, Reni will only have recorded a few albums in his life. I wanted a full documentation of his drumming. Those records are far more than anyone else is going to do, but I think it’s kind of sad that he’s not made a full record since Second Coming and may never do again. I'm sure he doesn't care, he's got all the money in the bank. I just don't like seeing good talent go to waste, because he's still one of the greatest drummers I’ve ever seen."

In late 2019, Squire confirmed the band had disbanded for a second time.

== "Reni Hats" ==
Wren habitually wore a bucket hat during his time with The Stone Roses. The nickname "Reni hat" for these hats is still in use, particularly in the UK.
