= Ian Brown =

English musician; singer of The Stone Roses

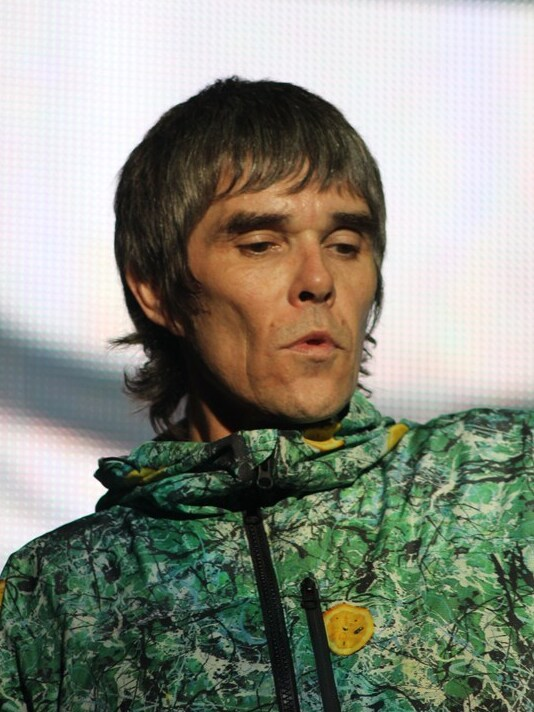
- Brown in 2012

Background information
- Born: Ian George Brown; 20 February 1963 (age 63); Warrington, England
- Genres: Alternative rock; indie rock; psychedelic rock; electronic rock; alternative dance; trip hop; reggae
- Occupations: Singer; musician; songwriter; actor
- Instruments: Vocals; guitar; keyboards; bass; drums; percussion; harmonica
- Years active: 1980–present
- Labels: Polydor/Fiction Records (UK); Interscope/E1 Music (US)
- Formerly of: The Stone Roses; The Patrol; The Waterfront
- Website: www.ianbrown.co.uk

Ian George Brown (born 20 February 1963) is an English musician. He was the lead singer and the only continuous member of the alternative rock band the Stone Roses from their formation in 1983. Following the band's initial split in 1996, he began a solo career, releasing seven studio albums, a greatest hits compilation, a remix album, an 11-disc box set titled Collection, and 19 singles. He returned to singing for the Stone Roses between 2011 and 2017.

== Early life and education ==
Brown was born in Warrington on 20 February 1963 and grew up on Forster Street, Orford, until the age of about six. His father, George, was a joiner, and his mother, Jean, worked as a receptionist in a paper factory. He then moved with his family, including a brother (David) and sister (Sharon) to Sylvan Avenue in Timperley, Altrincham.

He attended Park Road County Primary Infant and Junior School and then Altrincham Grammar School for Boys, leaving aged 16. In 2015 and 2017, he testified against a former teacher at Altrincham Grammar, Fred Talbot, who was found guilty of sexually abusing pupils in the 1970s.

Brown's interest in music was inspired by the punk movement, specifically the bands Sex Pistols, the Clash, and Manchester-based Slaughter & the Dogs. He was also an early follower of psychobilly music and was a regular at many scooter rallies in the north of England. Brown and original Stone Roses bassist Pete Garner attended the recording of the Clash single "Bankrobber" in Manchester.

== Music career ==
=== The Stone Roses ===
Brown's music career began in 1980, playing bass guitar in a band with John Squire and Simon Wolstencroft. They eventually became the Patrol, with Andy Couzens on vocals. The band soon split up, with Brown selling his bass to buy a scooter. Brown moved to Hulme, living in the Hulme Crescents estate, and attended Northern soul "all-nighters" across Northern England in the early 1980s as the scene faded. Around this time, Brown met soul legend Geno Washington, who told him, "You should be a star." In 1983, Brown joined the Waterfront, the band that would evolve into the Stone Roses, as co-vocalist.

The Stone Roses rose to prominence in the late 1980s and early 1990s, with their debut album voted the best British album of all time in 2004. The band's second album, Second Coming, received a mixed reaction, and after several changes of line-up, the band split up in October 1996.

On 17 October 2011, Brown alluded to a Stone Roses reunion via text message, saying, "We are going to rule the world again. It's happening." On the following day, a reunion was announced for the band with performances planned for June 2012 in Manchester. In a press conference interview, the members of the Stone Roses have said that a new album is planned.

On 2 December 2011, Ian Brown and John Squire performed together live for the first time since 1995. They joined Mick Jones from The Clash, The Farm, and Pete Wylie at the Manchester Ritz in a concert in aid of the Justice for Hillsborough campaign. They performed "Elizabeth My Dear" as a duo before being joined by Mick Jones and The Farm for renditions of the Clash's "Bankrobber" and "Armagideon Time", with Ian Brown taking on lead vocals for the three songs.

The Stone Roses reunited in 2011 and went on a reunion tour in 2012. They continued to tour until 2017 when the band disbanded for a second time.

=== Solo career ===
After a break from music in Morocco, Brown established his solo career with the debut solo single "My Star", which was released in the UK on 12 January 1998. The debut album Unfinished Monkey Business followed on 2 February 1998. The album was produced and financed by Brown and featured ex-Roses members Mani, Nigel Ipinson, Aziz Ibrahim, and Robbie Maddix. The album sold over 300,000 copies.

Brown toured in summer 1998 with a band that included Aziz Ibrahim (guitar), Inder "Goldfinger" Matharu (tabla/percussion), Simon Moore (drums), and Sylvan Richardson (bass), including performances at the Glastonbury Festival and the V Festival. Brown was arrested after a flight back from his live show in Paris and later sentenced to four months in prison for using threatening behaviour towards a flight attendant and captain, a charge he denied, causing his tour to be rescheduled. His bandmate Aziz Ibrahim condemned the sentence, saying that Brown was "just being cheeky". He had threatened to cut off the hands of the flight attendant and hammered on the cockpit door, as the plane came in to land. A few weeks before, he had threatened a magazine critic, who had given his album a one-star review, to a "good kicking".

While in Strangeways Prison, Brown wrote the lyrics for "Free My Way", "So Many Soldiers", and "Set My Baby Free". He was released on parole after two months.

His second album, Golden Greats, was released by Polydor Records in 1999. It featured more electronic instrumentation and earned critical acclaim. For his third studio album, Music of the Spheres, Brown sought outside production help for the first time, hiring the services of songwriter and producer Dave McCracken, who would go on to become a regular collaborator. He toured the US for the first time as a solo artist in support of the album.

Brown's fourth solo album, Solarized, was released in the UK on 13 September 2004 and was the first to be released under the revived Polydor imprint Fiction Records. When his new Fiction A&R Jim Chancellor was asked in HitQuarters what contribution he makes to Brown's records, he said, "There's not as much to do. Ian is very much the master of his own records."

Since the break-up of the Stone Roses in 1996, Brown has released six solo albums and fourteen UK Top 40 singles. He has sold out seven UK tours and appeared three times at the Glastonbury Festival, including headlining the Other Stage in 2005. He has appeared five times at V Festival since 1998, along with regular appearances at T in the Park and Oxegen festivals, and played the Move festival in 2002 at Old Trafford Cricket Ground as well as two tours of Australia in 2006 and 2008.

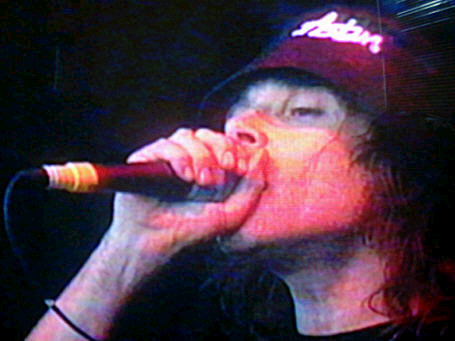
Ian Brown at the Witnness festival in Ireland in 2002

At the 2006 NME awards, Brown was presented with the "Godlike Genius" award and in 2007, was given the Q "Legend" Award.

In September 2007, Brown released his fifth studio album, The World Is Yours. The album represented a more political approach in his music, particularly the anti-war track "Illegal Attacks", which featured Sinéad O'Connor. The album also featured former Smiths bassist Andy Rourke, Paul Ryder of Happy Mondays, and Steve Jones and Paul Cook of The Sex Pistols.

My Way, his sixth solo album, was released in September 2009. It was recorded at London's Battery Studios with producer Dave McCracken; the first single, "Stellify", was released 21 September 2009. Brown played Manchester Arena for the third time in December 2009 and in 2010, made his third appearance in Moscow and second in Beijing, China. Since turning solo in 1998, Brown has played shows in 45 countries.

Brown has collaborated several times with UNKLE, appearing on "Be There" in 1999 and on "Reign" on the 2003 album Never, Never, Land, which was also released as a single.

On 25 October 2018, he released his first solo material in nine years with the single "First World Problems". His seventh studio album, Ripples, was then released on 1 February 2019.

On 18 September 2020, Brown announced the release of new song "Little Seed, Big Tree" through his Twitter account. The song appears to refer to the COVID-19 pandemic, and express anti-lockdown and anti-vaccine sentiment. Brown later complained that it was taken off Spotify. A Spotify spokesman stated that the platform "prohibits content on the platform which promotes dangerous false, deceptive, or misleading content about COVID-19".

In September 2022, he made the first appearance of a UK tour, with a sold-out performance in Leeds. His use of backing tracks in place of a live band was met with a negative reaction by some attendees.

== Film and television ==
Brown had a cameo role in the 2004 film Harry Potter and the Prisoner of Azkaban as a wizard magically stirring his drink while reading Stephen Hawking's A Brief History of Time at the Leaky Cauldron. In 2010, he had a cameo role as a police officer in Shane Meadows' series This is England '86, a sequel to the film This is England.

Brown voices a character in the New Zealand animated TV show Welcome to Cardboard City.

== Awards and achievements ==
Ian Brown has won several awards and magazine polls in his career, in recognition of his work as a solo artist and his work with the Stone Roses. The awards he has won are as follows:

The Stone Roses

- 1997 The Stone Roses reached No. 5 in The Guardian's 100 Best Albums Ever poll
- 1998 The Stone Roses reached No. 4 in Q magazine's 100 Best Albums Ever poll
- 2004 The Stone Roses reached No. 1 in The Observer's 100 Best British Albums Ever poll
- 2006 The Stone Roses reached No. 1 in the NME writers 100 Best British Albums Ever poll
- 2006 The Stone Roses reached No. 7 in NME fans 100 Best Albums Ever poll

Solo

- 2002 Muso Awards Best Single ("Whispers")
- 2002 NME Awards Best Solo Artist
- 2006 NME Awards Godlike Genius Award
- 2007 Q Awards Legend Award
- 1999, 2000, 2002, 2006, 2009 – nominated for Best British Solo Artist at the Brit Awards

== Discography ==
In the UK, Ian Brown as solo artist has sold over 500,000 albums.

=== Solo albums ===
==== Studio ====
Year	Title	UK	IRL	Certification
1998	Unfinished Monkey Business	4		UK: Gold
1999	Golden Greats	14		UK: Gold
2001	Music of the Spheres	3	6	UK: Gold
2004	Solarized	7	14	UK: Gold
2007	The World Is Yours	4	7	UK: Silver
2009	My Way	8	13	UK: Silver
2019	Ripples	4	14	

==== Remixes ====
Year	Title	UK
2002	Remixes of the Spheres	87

==== Compilations ====
Year	Title	UK	IRL	Certification
2005	The Greatest	5	13	UK: Platinum
2005	The Greatest Promos	–	–	

=== Singles ===
Year	Title	UK	IRL	Album
1998	"My Star"	5	9	Unfinished Monkey Business
1998	"Corpses in Their Mouths"	14	26	Unfinished Monkey Business
1998	"Can't See Me"	21	–	Unfinished Monkey Business
1999	"Be There" (UNKLE featuring Ian Brown)	8	22	Psyence Fiction
1999	"Love Like a Fountain"	23	–	Golden Greats
2000	"Dolphins Were Monkeys"	5	28	Golden Greats
2000	"Golden Gaze"	29	50	Golden Greats
2000	"Thriller"	–	–	"Golden Gaze"
2001	"F.E.A.R." (Certified Silver in the UK on 22 July 2013)	13	19	Music of the Spheres
2002	"Whispers"	33	–	Music of the Spheres
2004	"Keep What Ya Got"	18	29	Solarized
2004	"Reign" (UNKLE featuring Ian Brown)	40	–	Never, Never, Land
2005	"Time Is My Everything"	15	29	Solarized
2005	"All Ablaze"	20	32	The Greatest
2007	"Illegal Attacks" (Ian Brown featuring Sinéad O'Connor)	16	32	The World Is Yours
2007	"Sister Rose"	87	–	The World Is Yours
2009	"Stellify"	31	42	My Way
2009	"Just Like You"	–	–	My Way
2018	"First World Problems"	–	–	Ripples
2020	"Little Seed, Big Tree"	–	–	
2023	"Rules"	– (Note: "Rules" did not enter the UK Top 100 Singles Chart but debuted and peaked at number 62 on the UK Singles Downloads Chart on 19 May 2023.)	–	Non-album single

== Personal life ==
Brown is a teetotaler, claiming that he has not had a drink of alcohol since 1999.

Brown was married to Fabiola Quiroz, a model from Mexico. They divorced in 2011. He has three children, one with Quiroz, the other two from a previous relationship.

Brown is a lifelong supporter of Manchester United F.C. and is a season ticket holder. For the 2005–06 season, Brown was the shirt sponsor of London Commercial Division football team Chiswick Homefields, the players wearing an "IB – The Greatest" logo on their chests.

In 2011, Brown was given a driving ban following three speeding violations. He was fined over £1,900.

=== Views ===
Brown believes in God, but does not subscribe to any organised religion.

During the COVID-19 pandemic in the United Kingdom, Brown promoted conspiracy theories that contributed to COVID-19 misinformation, and criticised lockdowns, the use of masks and the COVID-19 vaccine. In July 2021, Brown received a two-week Twitter ban for posting that the vaccine was not effective. He pulled out of a festival headline slot as he disagreed with its vaccine passport for entry policy, calling it the "new nazi normal".

Brown's anti-COVID lockdown song Little Seed, Big Tree, which featured lyrics alluding to conspiracy theories about the COVID-19 vaccine, was taken down from Spotify. The song was re-listed on Spotify, and was available as of February 2026.

== Bibliography ==
- Larkin, Colin (ed.) (1998) The Virgin Encyclopedia of Indie & New Wave, Virgin Books, ISBN 0-7535-0231-3
- Robb, John (2001) The Stone Roses and the Resurrection of British Pop, Random House, ISBN 0-09-187887-X
