= John Squire =

English musician and painter (born 1962)

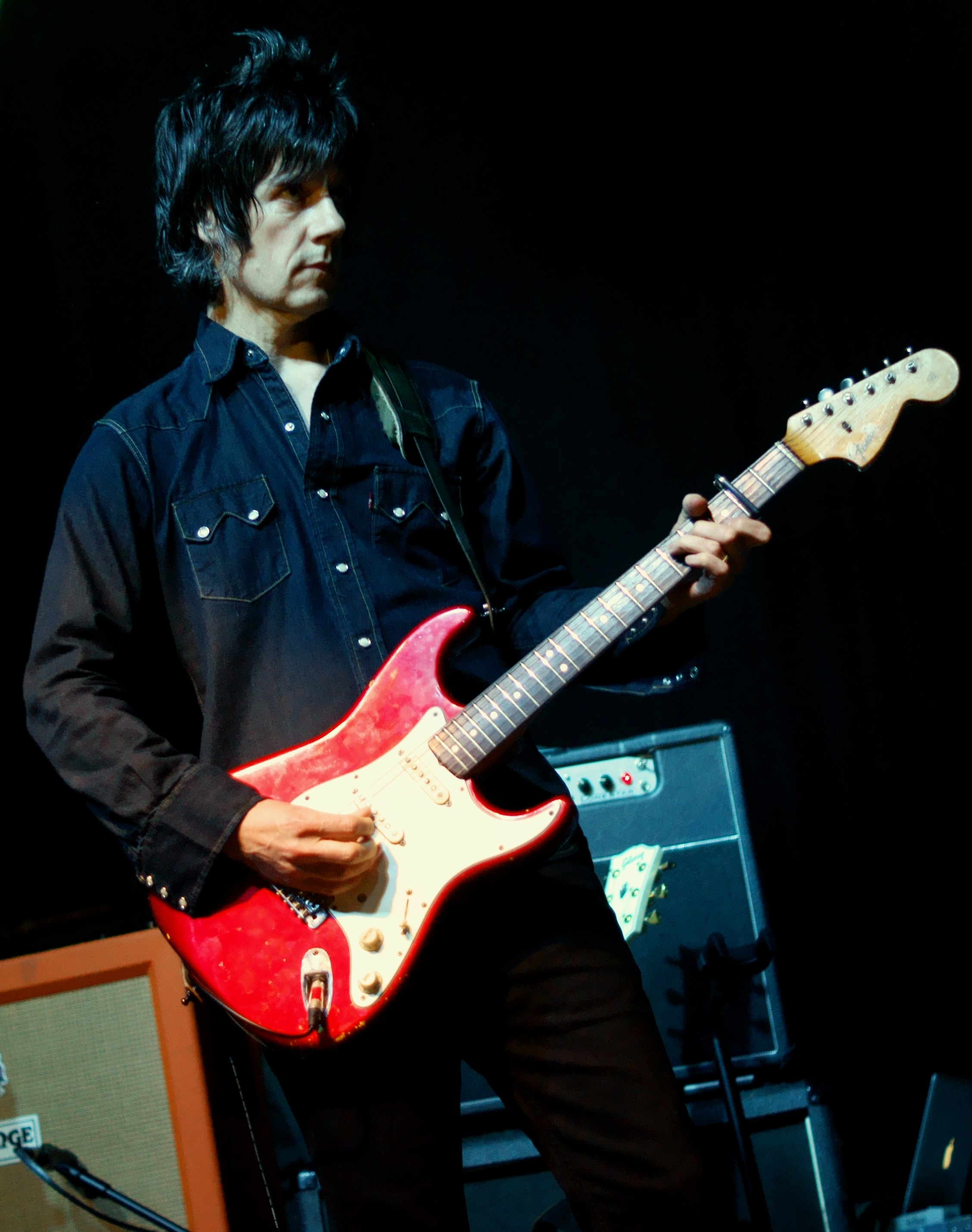
- Squire performing in Manchester, England, 2011

Background information
- Born: Jonathan Thomas Squire; 24 November 1962 (age 63); Altrincham, Cheshire, England
- Genres: Alternative rock; Madchester; psychedelic rock; blues rock
- Instruments: Guitar; vocals
- Years active: 1980–2007; 2011–2017; 2022–2024
- Labels: Silvertone; Geffen
- Formerly of: The Stone Roses; The Patrol; The Seahorses; John Squire's Skunkworks
- Website: johnsquire.com

Jonathan Thomas Squire (born 24 November 1962) is an English musician, songwriter and painter. He was the guitarist for rock band The Stone Roses, in which he formed a songwriting partnership with singer Ian Brown. Known for his chiming melodies, spiralling riffs and live solos, Squire has been described as one of the most accomplished and influential British rock guitarists of the late 1980s and early 1990s. He was voted 13th-greatest guitarist of the last 30 years in a national poll by BBC 6 Music in 2010.

After leaving The Stone Roses he went on to form The Seahorses and released two solo albums. In 2007, Squire gave up music to fully commit to painting. However, he later returned to music when The Stone Roses reformed in 2011.

When The Stone Roses disbanded for a second time in 2017, Squire again retired from music and returned to painting. However, he continued to play guitar occasionally, including making guest appearances for two shows with Oasis frontman Liam Gallagher at Knebworth in 2022. In late 2023, he worked with Gallagher on a collaborative studio album, which was released in 2024.

== Early life ==
Squire was born in Broadheath, Altrincham, Cheshire. He grew up on Sylvan Avenue in Timperley, around the corner from Ian Brown, and, after attending Heyes Lane Junior School, he passed the eleven plus exam and went to Altrincham Grammar School for Boys. As a child he excelled at art. He formed a close friendship with Ian Brown during their last two years at school together after Brown aided him in a fight with a school bully. The two further bonded over a shared love for punk rock, particularly The Clash.

Squire and Brown moved on to South Trafford College after passing O-Levels. Brown got expelled and Squire dropped out shortly after in order to form a band. Although Squire had a couple of guitar lessons, he was largely self taught.

== Music career ==
=== 1983–1996: The Stone Roses ===
In the early 1980s Squire and Brown founded a band, Patrol, that eventually became The Stone Roses. Squire was lead guitarist, and the partnership between him and Brown formed the heart of the band's lyrical and musical output.

The Stone Roses became one of the most influential acts of its era. Their 1989 eponymous debut album quickly achieved the status of a classic in the UK, and topped NME's list of the Greatest British Albums of All Time. Squire (calling himself John, instead of his birth name of Jonathan) co-wrote all of the tracks with Brown and painted the cover art, a Jackson Pollock-influenced piece containing references to the May 1968 riots in Paris.

The band's second album, Second Coming was released in 1994. It featured a heavier blues-rock sound, inspired by Led Zeppelin and the Allman Brothers Band, but fused with Ian Brown's distinct vocal style. The album also featured Squire's vocals for the first time on 'Tightrope' and 'How Do You Sleep'. Squire wrote the majority of its songs alone. The album was met with mixed reaction from fans, and shortly after band infighting and rumoured cocaine abuse led to his departure from the band on 1 April 1996. The band dissolved six months later.

=== 1996–1999: The Seahorses ===
With three previously unknown musicians, Squire formed a new band, The Seahorses, in 1996. The band's only album Do it Yourself was released in 1997. It is alleged the band's name forms an anagram of "He Hates Roses", for Squire's dislike of his previous band. The Seahorses disbanded due to creative differences in 1999, during sessions for their second album set to be named "Minus Blue" or "Motorcade".

=== 1999–2000: John Squire's Skunkworks ===
Following the demise of The Seahorses, Squire continued work with drummer Mark Heaney and ex-Verve bassist Simon Jones along with new vocalist Duncan Baxter as John Squire's Skunkworks, but left prior to the band releasing material as The Shining.

=== 2000–2004: Time Changes Everything, Marshall's House and aborted third album ===
Squire released his first solo album, Time Changes Everything in 2002. A concept album followed in 2004, entitled Marshall's House. Squire also stated that he had recorded a third album but decided not to release it, as he felt that promoting and touring the album would be an excessive burden. This is the second time that Squire has recorded material and opted not to release it, having also done so with the Seahorses' aborted second album.

After leaving The Stone Roses, Squire had a lasting feud with ex-bandmate Ian Brown, with the pair not having spoken in over a decade since Squire's departure from the band. In a 2005 Q magazine article, Squire blasted Brown, claiming "When he (Brown) was stoned, he was at best a tuneless knob and at worst a paranoid mess" (this was in response to queries about what had gone wrong with the Second Coming recording sessions, and the state of Brown's vocal due to his cannabis intake). Although both Brown and Squire performed Stone Roses songs in their solo gigs, a band reunion seemed unlikely. Squire was interviewed in June 2007 by Dave Haslam on XFM Manchester radio and discussed his current work as an artist, and claimed that even if Brown phoned him and suggested a Stone Roses reunion, he would turn the offer down. But in an interview on The Culture Show in 2008, Squire stated: "I went to that Led Zeppelin reunion show, and on the way back in the car I was thinking it would be good to do something like that one day."

In March 2009, Squire appeared to put an end to speculation surrounding The Stone Roses' reunion by defacing one of his artworks with the text "I have no desire whatsoever to desecrate the grave of seminal Manchester pop group the Stone Roses." Also on 19 March 2009, Squire appeared on the BBC's Newsnight, and when asked if a reunion would ever occur, he stated that it would "absolutely most definitely not". He said he came on air to address the fans once and for all and also, "to stop the phones ringing." He also stated his belief that music is a young person's game.

=== 2011–2017: Reunion Tour ===
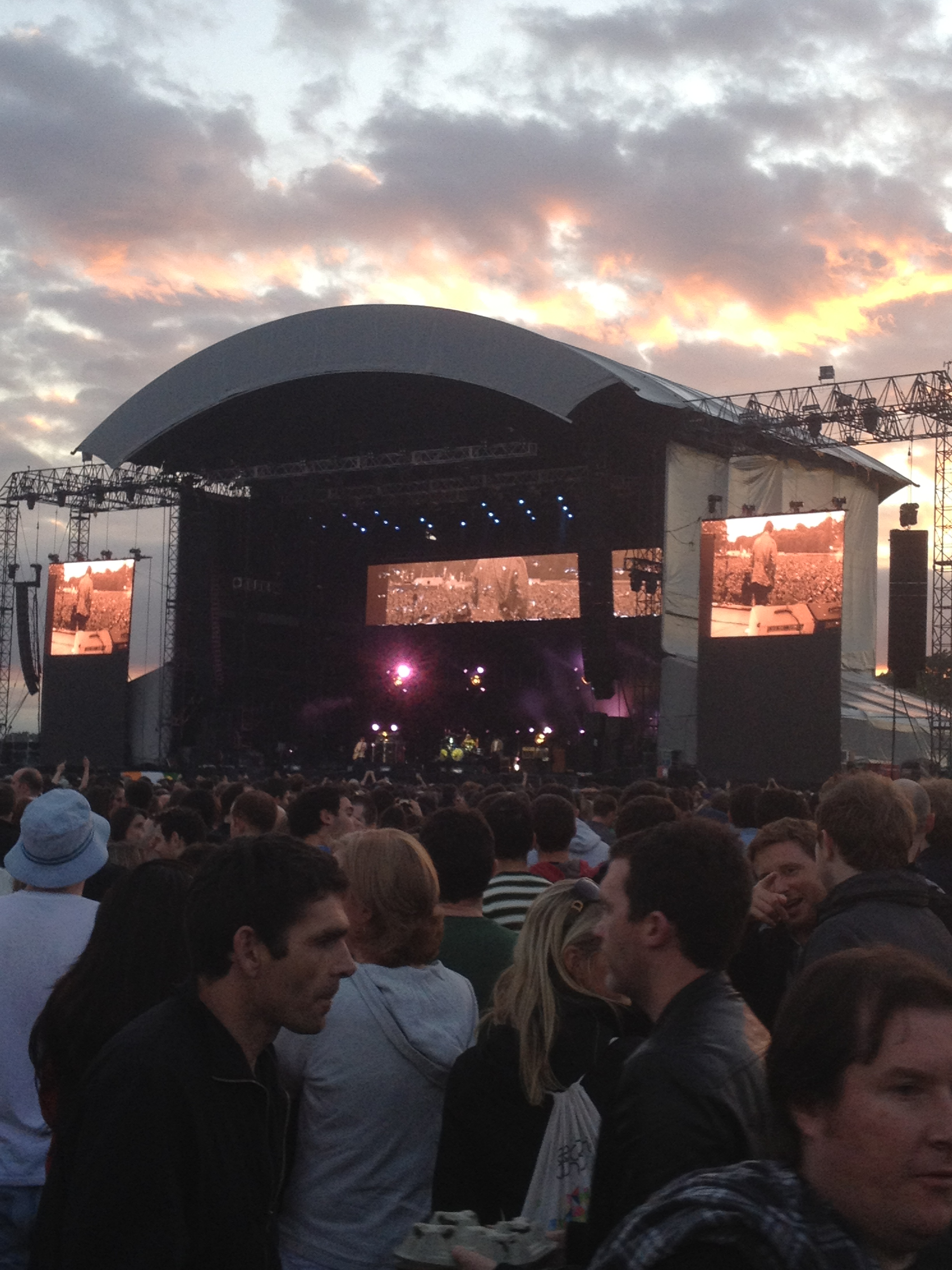
The Stone Roses playing Phoenix Park, Dublin during their 2012 Reunion tour.

In March 2011, Brown and Squire met at the funeral of Mani's mother, leading to speculation that the band would reform. This was angrily denied at the time by Mani. However, on 18 October 2011, at London's Soho Hotel, The Stone Roses announced that they would reunite for the first time in fifteen years, playing three shows at Heaton Park, Manchester, on 29 and 30 June and 1 July 2012 as part of an extensive Reunion Tour, and on 2 December 2011 Brown and Squire performed together live for the first time since 1995. They joined Mick Jones from the Clash, the Farm and Pete Wylie at the Manchester Ritz in aid of the Justice for Hillsborough campaign. They performed "Elizabeth My Dear" as a duo before being joined by Mick Jones and the Farm for renditions of the Clash's "Bankrobber" and "Armagideon Time" with Ian Brown taking on lead vocals for the three songs. The Stone Roses played a European tour in the summer of 2012. The band played around the world, playing their last concert in 2017. Squire then returned to painting. In a 2019 interview, he said he had written and recorded some songs but only his wife had heard them.

=== 2022–2024: Liam Gallagher & John Squire ===
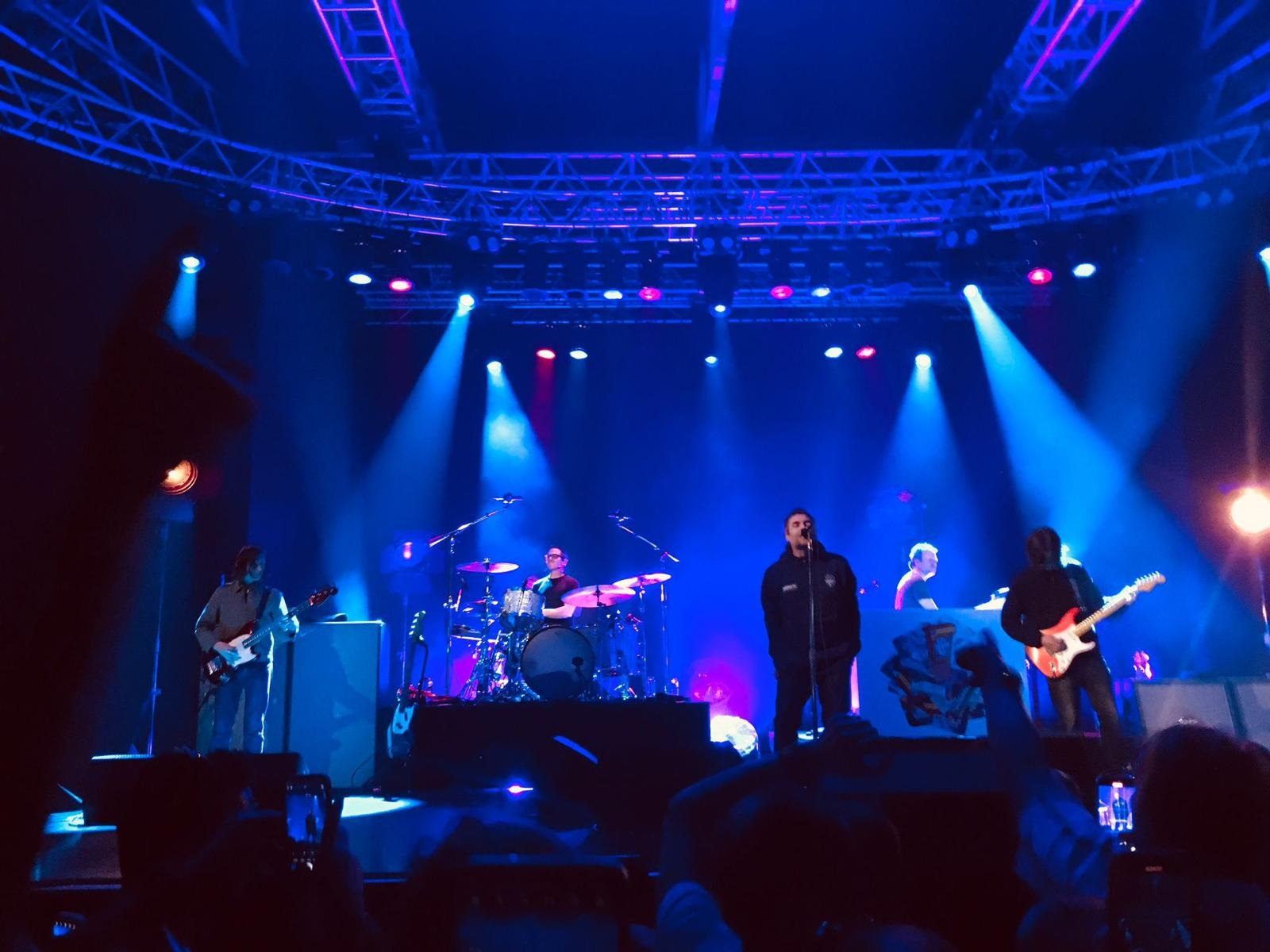
Liam Gallagher and John Squire performing in Milan in 2024

On 3 and 4 June 2022, Squire made his first stage appearances in five years at the encore of Liam Gallagher's two Knebworth Park concerts, as a guest guitarist on the song "Champagne Supernova". These mirrored the guest appearances he had previously made at Oasis' record-breaking Knebworth shows in 1996.

In late 2023, Squire started working with Gallagher on the album Liam Gallagher & John Squire, which they released on 1 March 2024. Debuting atop the U.K. charts, the album was preceded by the singles "Just Another Rainbow" (peaking at number sixteen in the UK Singles Chart) and "Mars to Liverpool". Squire and Gallagher announced their debut tour, on 26 January 2024, with sell out performances in Leeds, Glasgow, Manchester, Newcastle, London and Dublin.

== Art career ==
Besides music, Squire is also a published artist. His artwork has adorned single and album covers and promotional posters for his and the Stone Roses' music. In the 1980s, Squire's artistic style was heavily influenced by the action painting technique of Jackson Pollock. In recent years, Squire has shown a broader use of media and has incorporated newer influences to his work. One such item – a surfboard covered with Beach Boys song lyrics, which was for the War Child charity to auction – featured on the cover for Travis's 1997 single release "U16 Girls" and their debut album Good Feeling. In 2004, Squire held two well-received art exhibitions in London and Manchester.

He has exhibited his artwork at the Smithfield Gallery (July 2007) and the Dazed Gallery, London (September-October 2007). At the Smithfield Gallery opening, Squire told a reporter from the Manchester Evening News he was giving up music for good. He explained that "I'm enjoying this far too much to go back to music." When asked about a Stone Roses reunion, he said it was "highly unlikely".

In January 2009, Squire launched a new exhibition of his art, Heavy Metal Semantics, in London, and further exhibitions in Oldham, Austria and Tokyo later in the year. Further exhibitions include Edinburgh in August 2010, Brussels in early 2011 and London in 2019.

In late 2012, Squire's art studio burned down. The studio, a converted sheep barn on his farm in Cheshire, was ruled to have caught ablaze by accident. Squire said he was "extremely sad" that a lot of his artwork had been destroyed.

== Personal life ==
Squire is married to Sophie Upton, with whom he has three children. He also has three children from a previous relationship. Squire and Upton live on a farm in rural Cheshire.

== Discography ==
=== Albums ===
- Time Changes Everything (2002) No.17 UK
- Marshall's House (2004) No.90 UK
- Liam Gallagher & John Squire (with Liam Gallagher) (2024) No.1 UK

=== Singles ===
- "Joe Louis" (2002) No.43 UK
- "Room in Brooklyn" (2004) No.44 UK
- "Just Another Rainbow" (with Liam Gallagher) (2024) No.16 UK
- "Mars to Liverpool" (with Liam Gallagher) (2024)
- "Raise Your Hands" (with Liam Gallagher) (2024)
- "I'm a Wheel" (with Liam Gallagher) (2024)

=== Live albums and EPS ===
- Time Changes Everything Live EP (Japan only) (2003)

== Touring band members ==
with Liam Gallagher

- Barrie Cadogan – bass (2024)
- Joey Waronker – drums (2024)
- Christian Madden – keyboards (2024)

== Bibliography ==
- Robb, John (2001). The Stone Roses and the Resurrection of British Pop. Random House. ISBN 0-09-187887-X.
