= 808 State discography =

- 808 State in 1991
- Studio albums: 8
- Extended plays: 6
- Compilation albums: 10
- Singles: 25
- Video albums: 2

The following is a comprehensive discography of 808 State, an English electronic music group.

== Albums ==
=== Studio albums ===
Title	Album details	Peak chart positions		Certifications (sales thresholds)
Title	Album details	UK	AUS	Certifications (sales thresholds)
Newbuild	Released: September 1988; Label: Creed; Format: Vinyl, CD, digital download	—	—	
Quadrastate (Note: Released as a mini-album.)	Released: 31 July 1989; Label: Creed; Format: Vinyl, CD, digital download	—	—	
90	Released: 4 December 1989; Label: ZTT; Format: Vinyl, CD, digital download	57	97	BPI: Gold
ex:el	Released: 4 March 1991; Label: ZTT; Format: Vinyl, CD, digital download	4	109	BPI: Gold
Gorgeous	Released: 1 February 1993; Label: ZTT; Format: Vinyl, CD, digital download	17	—	
Don Solaris	Released: 17 June 1996; Label: ZTT; Format: Vinyl, CD, CS, digital download	88	—	
Outpost Transmission	Released: 13 November 2002; Label: Circus; Format: Vinyl, CD, digital download	—	—	
Transmission Suite	Released: 11 October 2019; Label: Self-released; Format: Vinyl, CD, digital download	—	—	
"—" denotes a title that was not released or did not chart in that territory.

=== EPs, compilations, remixes and video compilations ===
Year	Album	Label	Additional information
1990	The Extended Pleasure of Dance	ZTT	3-track EP which includes different versions of songs on their album 90.: 1. Cobra Bora (Call the Cops Mix) – 4:49; 2. Ancodia (Taters Deep Nit Funky Beat Mix) – 5:37; 3. Cübik – 3:32
1990	The North at Its Heights	ZTT	Collaboration album released by MC Tunes and produced by 808 State.
1990	Utd. State 90	Tommy Boy	An alternate version of the 90 album for the United States market. The track "The Fat Shadow (Pointy Head Mix)" is dropped, but additional tracks are included, comprising remixes of 90 and Quadrastate tracks plus new material.
1991	808:90ptical	ZTT	Video complication of tracks from The North At Its Heights and 90.
1993	Forecast	Warner Japan	Includes various remixes that previously appeared as B-sides on singles for "Plan 9", "Timebomb", "One in Ten" and "Cübik" / "Olympic", as well tracks exclusive to the bonus "Disco" 12-inch given away with a limited edition of the Gorgeous LP.
1994	State to State	Feedback Communications / ZTT	An album produced exclusively for members of 808 State's official fan club. It featured artwork and packaging designed by The Designer's Republic. All the tracks were previously unreleased, comprising live performances and tracks from Gorgeous, Quadrastate and Fon Studio sessions.
1996	Sawnoff Dali	ZTT	Sampler EP with select song from their next album Don Solaris.
1996	Thermo Kings	Warner Japan	Like Forecast before it, Thermo Kings was a Japan-only compilation of various B-sides, this time from the singles for "Bond", "Azura" and "Lopez", as well as a number of previously unreleased tracks.
1998	808:88:98	ZTT	A greatest hits compilation, featuring most of 808 State's major single releases. It also includes a new track, "Crash", plus a new remix of "Pacific".
1998	Pacific 808:98 / Cübik:98	ZTT	Set of CDs with remixes of "Pacific State" and "Cübik".
2002	Opti Buk + State to State 2	ZTT	Opti Buk DVD promo video collection. Includes the second State to State compilation with previously unreleased tracks from various studio-based sessions.
2004	Prebuild	Rephlex	A collection of previously unreleased tracks and demos from the Newbuild era. It also includes tracks from an EP released under the pseudonym The Lounge Jays.
2011	Blueprint	ZTT / Salvo	A career overview, that features newly revisited tracks from years 1988 to 2003 as well as original versions there of, unreleased and released before remixes and two new tracks, "Spanish Ice" and "Metaluna". It also features an extensive booklet with a foreword by Orbital's Phil Hartnoll, archive interview with members of the band by Paul Morley, and contributions from The Prodigy, Simian, Moby and The Future Sound of London.
2011	State to State 3	Self-released	Digital album with unreleased songs from the band.
2012	O.T.E.P.	Self-released	An EP containing 4 bonus tracks from the Japanese and North American releases of Output Transmission, available as a free download.
2019	Four States of 808 State	ZTT	Limited edition box set of select tracks by the band.
2019	Initial Granada Report	Self-released	An EP containing 4 tracks, comprising some of the first new original 808 State material since 2002's Outpost Transmission.
2019	Subsequent Granada Report	Self-released	A second EP containing a further 4 new tracks including "Cannonball Waltz" and "The Ludwig Question" from the album Transmission Suite.
2021	ESP: The 808 State Effect	ZTT	Digital compilation album by ZTT.

== Singles ==
Year	Title	Peak chart position					Album
Year	Title	UK	AUS	IRL	US Dance	US Dance Sales	Album
1988	"Let Yourself Go" / "Deepville"	—	—	—	—	—	Non-album single
1989	"Pacific 707"	10	82	17	30	27	Remixed from 90
1990	The Extended Pleasure of Dance (EP)	56	—	—	—	—	EP
1990	"Primary Rhyming" (MC Tunes vs. 808 State)	67	—	—	—	—	The North at Its Heights (MC Tunes vs. 808 State)
1990	"The Only Rhyme That Bites" (MC Tunes vs. 808 State)	10	—	21	—	—	The North at Its Heights (MC Tunes vs. 808 State)
1990	"Tunes Splits the Atom" (MC Tunes vs. 808 State)	18	—	28	—	—	The North at Its Heights (MC Tunes vs. 808 State)
1990	"Cübik" / "Olympic"	10	159	23	8	21	ex:el
1991	"In Yer Face"	9	108	13	—	—	ex:el
1991	"Ooops" (featuring Björk)	42	143	24	13	23	ex:el
1991	"Lift" / "Open Your Mind"	38	153	—	23	27	ex:el
1992	"The Only Rhyme That Bites" (re-issue) (MC Tunes vs. 808 State)	47	—	87	—	—	Non-album single
1992	"Time Bomb" / "Nimbus"	59	—	—	19	36	Gorgeous
1992	"One in Ten" (808 State vs. UB40)	17	135	19	—	—	Gorgeous
1993	"Plan 9"	50	199	—	—	—	Gorgeous
1993	"10 × 10"	67	143	—	43	—	Gorgeous
1994	"Bombadin"	67	—	—	3	—	Non-album single
1996	"Bond"	57	—	—	—	—	Don Solaris
1996	"Azura"	79	—	—	—	—	Don Solaris
1997	"Lopez" (featuring James Dean Bradfield)	20	—	—	—	—	Don Solaris
1998	"Pacific 808:98" / "Cübik" (remixes)	21	—	—	3	—	808:88:98
1999	"The Only Rhyme That Bites 99" (MC Tunes vs. 808 State)	53	—	—	—	—	Non-album singles
1999	"Invader"	—	—	—	—	—	Non-album singles
2011	"Cübik" (21st Anniversary Remix)	—	—	—	—	—	Non-album singles
2019	"Tokyo Tokyo"	—	—	—	—	—	Transmission Suite
2020	“Where Wye & Severn”	—	—	—	—	—	Non-album single
"—" denotes a title that was not released or did not chart in that territory.
