= Andy Barker (musician) =

English musician and DJ (1968–2021)

- Born: Andrew Barker; 9 March 1968; Manchester, England
- Died: 6 November 2021 (aged 53) Manchester, England
- Genres: Acid house; techno; electronic
- Occupations: Musician; DJ; record producer
- Instruments: Keyboards; bass
- Years active: c. 1985–2021
- Formerly of: 808 State, The Spinmasters

Andrew "Andy" Barker (9 March 1968 – 6 November 2021) was an English musician and DJ from Manchester, best known as the bassist and keyboardist of the electronic group 808 State. Having begun as a DJ in the mid-1980s with The Spinmasters, he joined 808 State in 1989 alongside Darren Partington after the departure of Gerald Simpson, and remained – with Graham Massey – the group's only ever-present member from then until his death. He played on the group's UK top-ten singles including "Pacific State", "The Only Rhyme That Bites", "Cubik" and "In Yer Face", and on every studio album from Ninety (1989) to Transmission Suite (2019). With Partington he also presented the 808 State radio show on Manchester's Sunset Radio and later Kiss in the early 1990s.

== Early life and The Spinmasters ==
Barker was born in Manchester on 9 March 1968.

As a teenager in the mid-1980s, he was part of the city's soul and hip hop scene as a member of the DJ group The Spinmasters, with Darren Partington and Shine MC. According to Bill Brewster, the pair began playing at Salvation Army discos, funding their record buying by selling crisps and chocolate on the side. In youth clubs they took part in DJ battles against Gerald Simpson's Scratch Beat Masters crew, which included the rapper MC Tunes.

By the late 1980s The Spinmasters were among the most prominent DJ teams in the north of England, holding a residency at the Thunderdome club on Oldham Road in Manchester.

== 808 State ==
808 State was formed in Manchester by Graham Massey, Martin Price and Gerald Simpson, who released the album Newbuild in 1988. When Simpson left in 1989 to pursue his solo project A Guy Called Gerald, Barker and Partington – whom Massey and Price had met at Price's Eastern Bloc record shop – were recruited to the group, with Barker taking on bass and keyboards. DJ Mag's Carl Loben wrote that the two newcomers "brought more of a song structure" to the group's earlier extended acid house jams.

Barker had been playing an early, unreleased version of "Pacific State" from cassette as the last record of the night at his Thunderdome residency, and it became the group's first hit after they signed to ZTT Records; Barker later said that the version which charted was the one he and Partington had helped structure as a song. The single reached number 10 on the UK Singles Chart. Barker appeared on the album Ninety (1989), and the group had further UK top-ten singles with "The Only Rhyme That Bites" (1990), a collaboration with MC Tunes, and "Cubik" and "In Yer Face" (1990–91), followed by a top-twenty hit in 1992 with a reworking of UB40's "One in Ten".

After Price left in 1991, the group continued as a trio of Barker, Massey and Partington. During the 1990s the group released the albums Ex:el (1991), Gorgeous (1993) and Don Solaris (1996), working with guest vocalists including Björk, Bernard Sumner, James Dean Bradfield and Ian McCulloch.

Barker and Partington also hosted the 808 State radio show, which from 1990 broadcast on Tuesday nights on Manchester's Sunset Radio before moving to Kiss.

The group largely stopped recording after Outpost Transmission (2002), although they continued to play live. Partington left in 2015, leaving Barker and Massey as a duo. In 2017 the pair set up a studio in the former transmission room of the old Granada Studios building in Manchester, where they recorded Transmission Suite, released in 2019 as the group's first studio album in 17 years. Barker said it had taken him about five years to persuade Massey to return to the studio. In his later years Barker also programmed the Unfairground stage at Glastonbury Festival and had been recording with Rowetta of the Happy Mondays.

Barker played on the group's UK top-ten singles and on every studio album from Ninety (1989) to Transmission Suite (2019).

== Death ==
Barker died in Manchester on 6 November 2021, aged 53, after a short illness. The news was announced by 808 State the following day with a statement from his family asking that he be remembered "for the joy he brought through his personality and music". Tributes were paid by musicians and DJs including Rowetta, Justin Robertson, Dave Haslam, The Blessed Madonna and Darren Emerson. Writing in Mixmag, Bill Brewster opined that 808 State, rather than guitar bands such as the Happy Mondays and The Stone Roses, represented "the real heart and soul" of Manchester's dance music scene.

== Discography ==
With 808 State:

- Ninety (1989)
- Ex:el (1991)
- Gorgeous (1993)
- Don Solaris (1996)
- Outpost Transmission (2002)
- Transmission Suite (2019)
