= MVITA =

British sound system and music collective from Manchester

- Also known as: M.V.I.T.A., M-VITA, Manchester Vibes In The Area
- Origin: Manchester, England
- Genres: House; Garage; Reggae; Soul; Funk
- Years active: 1988–present
- Members: Himat Singh (percussion); Anton Behrendt (keyboards/bass); Darren Green (DJ); Stefan Juniper (DJ)
- Past members: Alfonso Buller (MC; died 2026)

MVITA (an acronym of Manchester Vibes In The Area, also styled M.V.I.T.A. or M-VITA) is a British sound system and music collective founded in Manchester in 1988 by MC Alfonso Buller and percussionist Himat Singh. MVITA became part of the Madchester scene of the late 1980s and early 1990s, performing at after-show parties for The Stone Roses, Happy Mondays, New Order and 808 State, and appearing as a support act at The Stone Roses' Spike Island concert in May 1990. The group performed on the Pyramid Stage at Glastonbury Festival in 1990 and appeared on Channel 4's Dancedaze television series the same year. Buller died on 2 February 2026, aged 66.

== History ==
=== Formation (1988) ===
MVITA was founded in early 1988 by MC Alfonso Buller and percussionist Himat Singh at The Midland, a public house in West Didsbury, south Manchester, after being inspired by the Reno club in Moss Side, the racially mixed basement venue Buller had frequented from boyhood. Speaking to Louder Than War in 2012, Buller recalled that the landlord allowed the group to "shut the curtains, turn all the lights off, cover the pool table" and run their own night, with their flag hung above the room. The collective took the name "Manchester Vibes In The Area", abbreviated to MVITA, with a logo combining a pyramid, sun and moon.

By November 1989, MVITA had attracted the attention of Soul Underground magazine, which published a profile of the group.

=== Madchester era (1988–1992) ===
MVITA operated as a sound system before later writing their own material. They became regular fixtures at after-show parties for The Stone Roses, Happy Mondays, New Order and 808 State, and were closely associated with the Madchester scene.

In March 1990, MVITA's demo "Manchester Vibes in the Area" reached number 7 on the KFM Demo Top Ten chart, as reported in Terry Christian's "The Word" column in the Manchester Evening News. The following month, Christian featured MVITA in a further column, describing the scene at The Midland pub as having "a reggae blues party atmosphere fuelled by euphoria" and calling Buller "MC extraordinaire Phonso." The column noted that MVITA had been turned down by Factory Records and The Haçienda before signing with Stockport label Cut Deep Records.

Members of MVITA, including Buller and Himat "Chester" Singh, are listed among the support DJs at The Stone Roses' Spike Island concert on 27 May 1990, alongside Dave Haslam, Paul Oakenfold, Frankie Bones and Dave Booth.

On 1 June 1991, Buller served as MC at the Happy Mondays concert at Elland Road, Leeds, alongside Paul Oakenfold and Mike Pickering as DJs.

In 1991, MVITA were billed alongside Laurent Garnier at The Sands Club in Stretford.

=== Television and recordings ===
In 1990, MVITA appeared on the Channel 4 television series Dancedaze, performing tracks including "Pyramid Sun" and "Dance" at Brixton Academy.

On 4 September 1990, MVITA appeared live on The 808 State Show on the Manchester dance music station Sunset 102, performing tracks and being interviewed by 808 State. Four of the tracks performed on the show—"Pyramid Sun", "Movin'", "More House" and "Dance"—were intended for release as the Pyramid Sun EP on Graham Massey's Cut Deep label (catalogue CUT 90 12008) in October 1990, but the release did not appear after the label folded.

MVITA's track "Time Waits For Nobody" was released in 1990 on Castle Music Pictures' Dancedaze 8 VHS compilation (catalogue CMP 6044), alongside Shut Up & Dance, Bass-O-Matic, Loose Ends and Outlaw Posse. An official music video for the track was filmed in 1991 at the JOOCE event in Morecambe, on a bill with Rozalla, K-Klass, Xpansions and 2 For Joy, and was later released on the Cherry Red Records YouTube channel.

=== Glastonbury Festival ===
In June 1990, MVITA performed on the Pyramid Stage at Glastonbury Festival, appearing on the same bill as Adamski and the Happy Mondays. MVITA returned to Glastonbury for six consecutive years from 1990.

=== Later activity ===
In 1998, MVITA performed with 808 State at a Pepsi Max event in Heaton Park.

MVITA continued to perform sporadically into the 2010s and 2020s, appearing at the Moovin Festival in Stockport. Speaking in 2012, Buller said the collective remained active and were being managed in part by Bez of Happy Mondays and Vince of Black Grape.

Buller, MVITA's co-founder and frontman, died at his home in Cornwall on 2 February 2026, aged 66; tributes were led by Ian Brown and Liam Gallagher. The Daily Express and Daily Mirror also reported on his death.

== Members ==
According to The North At Its Heights, MVITA's core line-up has comprised:

- Alfonso Buller – MC
- Himat Singh – percussion
- Anton Behrendt – keyboards and bass guitar
- Darren Green – DJ
- Stefan Juniper – DJ

Himat Singh, also known as "Chester" or "The Guru", was previously a member of the Manchester group Pleasure Crew, whose 1989 single "So Good" was released by Factory Records as FAC 169; Singh had worked with Mike Pickering on the recording.

=== Associates ===
Members and associates of the MVITA Soundsystem toured in support of Happy Mondays, 808 State and Inspiral Carpets, and played at Brixton Academy, in Reykjavík, Ibiza and Slovenia.

== Style and influences ==
MVITA's roots were in reggae, soul and funk, and the group embraced the wave of house music and garage that emerged in Manchester during the late 1980s. MVITA were noted as "the first soundsystem to have a live Sikh percussionist," and have been described as among the first Manchester sound systems of their era to feature a live percussionist. In the Louder Than War interview, Buller described Himat Singh as the group's "guru of house" and characterised the collective as "two DJs and me MCing", playing a mix of house, garage, soul and reggae.

== Cultural legacy ==
Photographer Ian Tilton has cited Buller as one of the first figures associated with the "Manchester swagger" later adopted by Ian Brown and Liam Gallagher.

MVITA's name has been credited as the source of the phrase "Manchester Vibes In The Area", which has since been used by Liam Gallagher and other Manchester musicians. Gallagher used the phrase to introduce Oasis onto stage during the Oasis Live '25 reunion tour at their Heaton Park shows in July 2025.

Buller was featured in the Arts Council England-funded heritage project "Excavating the Reno" (2017–2018) and the associated exhibition at the Whitworth Art Gallery, which documented the cultural significance of the Reno club in Moss Side. Speaking to The Guardian about the club in 2017, Buller said: "The police, the establishment and what felt like the whole world were against us ... But the Reno was the one place where we could feel special."

Photographer Adrian Fisk's images of Buller at a 1994 rave were exhibited at the Saatchi Gallery's "Sweet Harmony" exhibition, which toured to Manchester's Warehouse Project as a celebration of British rave culture.

== Discography ==
- "Time Waits For Nobody" (1990, on Dancedaze 8, Castle Music Pictures CMP 6044) – percussion, MC

== See also ==
- Madchester
- Spike Island (concert)
- Sunset 102
- Alfonso Buller
