= Alfonso Buller =

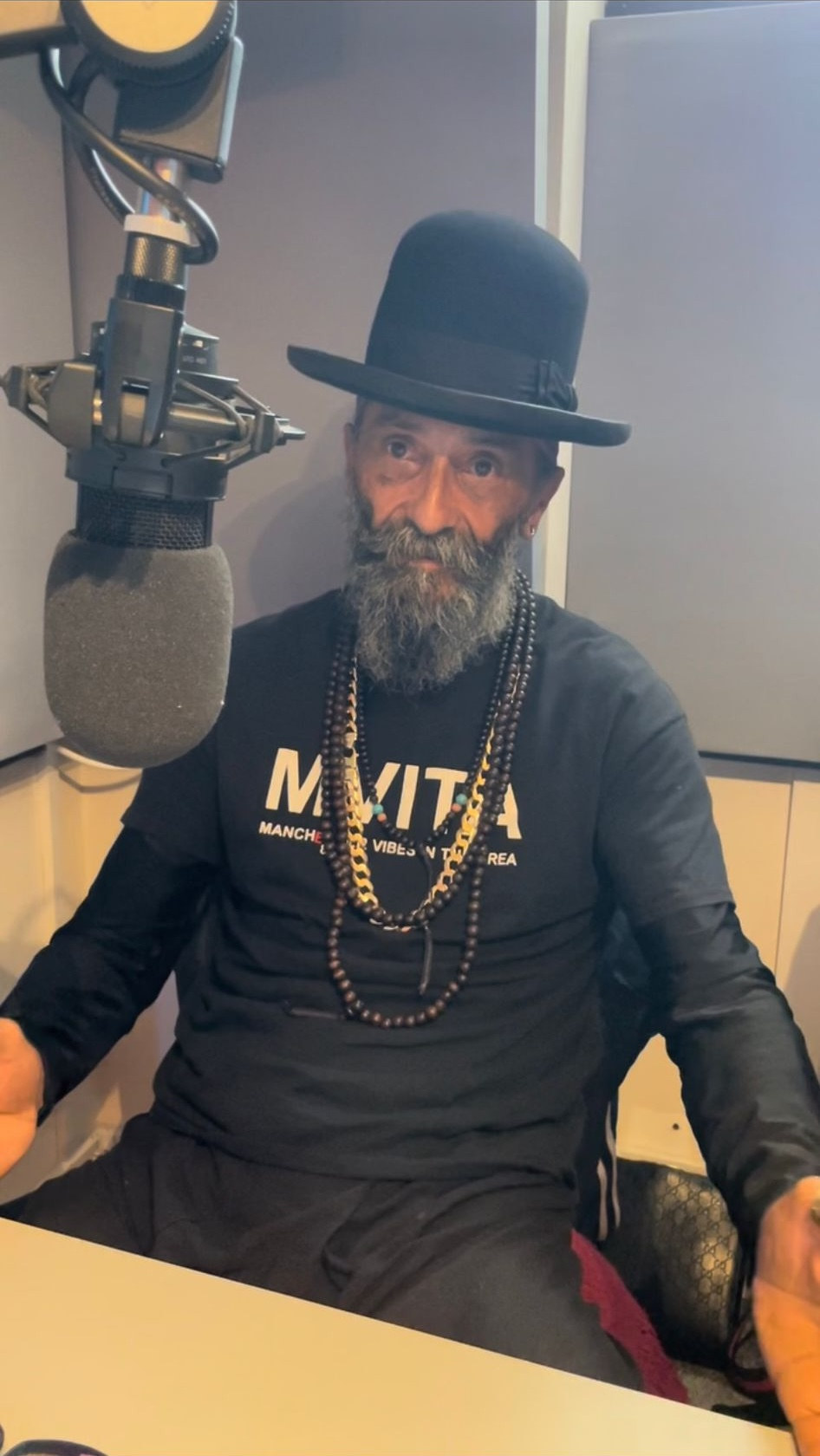
- Alfonso 'Fonzo' Buller being interviewed at Cheshire's MIX 56, September 2024

Background information
- Also known as: Fonzo
- Born: Alfonso Buller; 28th January 1961; Withington, Manchester, England
- Died: 2 February 2026 (aged 65) Cornwall, England
- Genres: House music, rave
- Occupations: MC, soundsystem co-founder, music promoter
- Years active: 1988–2026

Alfonso Lecruit Waters Buller (January 1960 – 2 February 2026) was an English MC, dancer, and music promoter, best known as the co-founder of the sound system MVITA. A key figure in the Madchester scene of the late 1980s and early 1990s, Buller and MVITA provided sound systems and performed at events for bands including The Stone Roses, Happy Mondays, and 808 State. He has been credited as an influence on the performance styles of Ian Brown and Liam Gallagher.

== Early life ==
Buller was born in Withington, a suburb of Manchester, to a Belizean immigrant father and a Romany Gypsy mother. He was one of ten children. He first visited The Reno, a late-night soul and funk club in Moss Side, at the age of 12. Speaking to The Guardian in 2017 about The Reno, Buller said: "The police, the establishment and what felt like the whole world were against us... But the Reno was the one place where we could feel special."

== Career ==
=== MVITA (Manchester Vibes In The Area) ===
In 1988, Buller and percussionist Himat Singh co-founded MVITA at The Midland pub (now The Met) in West Didsbury, Manchester. The sound system began by bringing house music to local pubs before progressing to underground raves. MVITA featured DJs including DJ Dominic, DJ Space Cake (also known as The Madhatter), DJ Stefan Juniper, and Darren Green, with Buller as MC and Singh on percussion. Singh had previously worked with Mike Pickering on Factory Records release FAC 169, "So Good" by The Pleasure Crew (1987). MVITA were noted as "the first soundsystem to have a live Sikh percussionist."

In March 1990, MVITA's demo "Manchester Vibes in the Area" reached number 7 on the KFM Demo Top Ten chart, as reported in Terry Christian's "The Word" column in the Manchester Evening News. In April 1990, Christian featured MVITA in his column, describing the scene at The Midland pub where "a crowd that look like refugees from the last episode of The Bash St Kids out of the Beano comic are raving on the dance floor, swinging from the light fittings and stomping on the tables." He described the nights as having "a reggae blues party atmosphere fuelled by euphoria" and called Buller "MC extraordinaire Phonso." The column noted that MVITA had been turned down by Factory Records and The Haçienda before signing with Stockport label Cut Deep Records.

In 1990, MVITA appeared on the Channel 4 television series Dancedaze, performing tracks including "Pyramid Sun" and "Dance". The tracks were never commercially released; a planned release on Cut Deep Records did not materialise after the label ceased operations.

On 4 September 1990, MVITA appeared live on The 808 State Show on Manchester dance music station Sunset 102, performing and being interviewed by 808 State.

=== Madchester scene ===
MVITA became closely associated with the Madchester movement, providing after-show party sound systems for Happy Mondays, The Stone Roses, and 808 State.

On 27 May 1990, MVITA were among the support acts at Spike Island, The Stone Roses' seminal concert in Widnes, with Buller performing as MC alongside DJs Dave Haslam, Paul Oakenfold, MC Tunes, Dave Booth, and Frankie Bones.

On 1 June 1991, Buller served as MC at the Happy Mondays concert at Elland Road, Leeds, alongside Paul Oakenfold and Mike Pickering as DJs. Buller was known for joining the Happy Mondays on stage, and former Happy Mondays singer Rowetta later shared a photograph of herself performing onstage with Buller in Dublin.

=== Glastonbury Festival ===
In June 1990, MVITA performed on the Pyramid Stage at Glastonbury Festival, appearing on the same bill as Adamski and the Happy Mondays. MVITA manager Alan Ingram later told the Manchester Evening News that Buller had been "on the Pyramid stage for six years running, not officially, but with Stone Roses, Joe Cocker, Finley Quaye, Simply Red – he was on stage with all of them together with Himat Singh the percussionist in MVITA."

=== Later career ===
In 1998, MVITA performed with 808 State at a Pepsi Max event in Heaton Park.

Buller continued performing and attending events in Manchester throughout his later years, despite having moved to Cornwall.

== Cultural influence ==
Photographer Ian Tilton described Buller as "the original one regarding that Oasis/Verve/Roses swagger, the first cool/cocky Northerner thing, a proper character and quite influential in that way." Bars entrepreneur John Locke credited Buller with creating "the Manchester swagger and attitude, which Ian Brown carried onstage and Liam Gallagher then took the energy world wide." Oliver Wilson, son of Tony Wilson, described Buller as a "key architect of the Manchester Vibe."

Before achieving fame with Oasis, Liam Gallagher regularly attended MVITA performances at The Midland pub. Gallagher later adopted Buller's "Manchester Vibes in the Area" catchphrase, using it to introduce Oasis onto stage during the Oasis Live '25 reunion tour, shouting "Manchester vibes in the area!" at their Heaton Park homecoming shows in July 2025.

MVITA manager Alan Ingram told the Manchester Evening News: "Everyone kind of loved him, all those factions that didn't get along, he brought them all together through dancing, music, love. He promoted love – that was his thing."

=== Heritage recognition ===
Buller was featured in the Arts Council England-funded heritage project "Excavating the Reno" (2017–2018) and the associated exhibition at the Whitworth Art Gallery. The project, led by playwright Linda Brogan and supported by a £65,000 National Lottery grant, combined oral history with archaeology to document the cultural significance of The Reno nightclub. Buller travelled from Cornwall for the entire three-week excavation, helping to coordinate attendance and MCing the events.

He also appeared in video memoirs for The Reno documentary project.

== Personal life and death ==
Buller had ten children and fifteen grandchildren. He was one of ten siblings; his brother Carlos Buller appeared on the Manchester edition of Channel 4's Come Dine with Me in 2008. Buller lived in Cornwall for the last 30 years of his life while maintaining regular connections to Manchester. He practised Buddhism.

Buller died peacefully in his sleep at his home in Cornwall on 2 February 2026, aged 65. Tributes were paid by Ian Brown, who called him "a King and Lion of Manchester," and Liam Gallagher, who wrote "RIP FONZO MVITA REWIND." Bez shared a photo with Buller and wrote "Fonso! Things are going to be alot quieter now." Rowetta posted a photograph of herself onstage with Buller in Dublin, calling him "a real gentleman, so supportive of me & so many others. His natural energy & positivity was something I had been yearning for for years."

Author and musician John Robb described him as "the one man riot who was Manchester Vibes In The Area – MVITA and part of the Stone Roses, Happy Mondays extended family." The Daily Express and Daily Mirror also reported on his death.
