= Andrew Barker =

Andrew or Andy Barker may refer to:

- Andrew Barker (merchant) (died 1577), English merchant
- Andrew Barker (classicist) (1943–2021), British academic specialising in ancient Greek music
- Andrew Barker (cricketer) (born 1945), English former cricketer
- Andy Barker (philanthropist) (1924–2011), American philanthropist
- Andy Barker (musician) (1968–2021), English musician and DJ
- Andy Barker, P.I., an American detective sitcom and the title character
