= Blueprint (808 State album) =

Compilation album by 808 State
- Released: 19 September 2011
- Genre: Electronica
- Length: 76:22
- Labels: Salvo, ZTT
- Producer: 808 State

808 State chronology
Prebuild (2004)	Blueprint (2011)	Initial Granada Report (2019)

Professional ratings
Review scores
Source	Rating
Pitchfork	7.5/10

Blueprint is a compilation of lesser known tracks and remixes made by the British electronic music group, 808 State. The album for initially released on 5 September 2011 digitally, but was released on CD 14 days later.

== Track listing ==
1. "Flow Coma" (AFX Remix by Aphex Twin) – 4:59
2. "Pacific State" (Origin) – 5:51
3. "In Yer Face" (Revisited) – 4:08
4. "Cübik" (Remix by Monkey Mafia) – 5:21
5. "Timebomb" (808 Tape Mix) – 4:43
6. "Cobra Bora" (Revisited) – 3:46
7. "Olympic" (Word Production Mix) – 4:55
8. "Nimbus" (Revisited) – 4:29
9. "Nephatiti" – 4:48
10. "Firecracker" (Edit) – 3:59
11. "Plan 9" (Radio Edit by Trevor Horn) – 3:42
12. "Lopez" (Radio Mix by Brian Eno) (featuring James Dean Bradfield) – 3:50
13. "Lemonsoul" (featuring Guy Garvey) –3:21
14. "Qmart" (featuring Björk) – 4:58
15. "606" (Revisited) (featuring Simian) – 5:07
16. "Spanish Ice" – 4:03
17. "Metaluna/Compulsion" (Revisited) – 4:22
