= Utd. State 90 =

Studio album by 808 State
- Released: 11 June 1990
- Genre: Acid house; techno
- Length: 73:13
- Label: Tommy Boy; Warner Bros.; ZTT

808 State chronology
90 (1989)	Utd. State 90 (1990)	ex:el (1991)

Professional ratings
Review scores
Source	Rating
AllMusic	4.5/5 stars
Encyclopedia of Popular Music	4/5 stars
Entertainment Weekly	A
MusicHound	5/5
The Rolling Stone Album Guide	3.5/5 stars
Slant Magazine	3.5/5 stars
Tom Hull – on the Web	B

Utd. State 90 is an album by the English electronic group 808 State. It was released on 11 June 1990 by Tommy Boy Records, Warner Bros. Records and ZTT Records. It is the group's US version of the Ninety album, and it features unique cover art and a longer, revised track listing.

== Track listing ==
1. "Pacific 202" – 5:43
2. "Boneyween" – 6:09
3. "Ancodia" – 5:12
4. "Kinky National" – 3:58
5. "Cobra Bora" – 5:47
6. "Cubik" – 3:36
7. "Magical Dream" – 3:49
8. "808080808" – 4:20
9. "Revenge of the Girlie Men" – 4:16
10. "Donkey Doctor" – 5:25
11. "Sunrise" – 6:33
12. "State to State" – 5:50
13. "Pacific 212" – 6:49*
14. "Pacific 718" – 5:46*

* – Bonus track
