= The Stone Roses: War and Peace =

The Stone Roses: War and Peace is a biography of the Stone Roses written by Stephen Spence and published by Penguin Books Ltd. in 2012.

== Synopsis ==
The biography tells the story of the Stone Roses methodically and comprehensively, recounting 70 new interviews with group members, their friends and commentators.

== Reviews ==
Steve Jelbert wrote in The Independent, "It's a pity, then, that Spence's exhaustive, well-researched biography is so solemn, every anecdote a marker on the road to greatness, rather than a celebration of a uniquely idiosyncratic, often absurd band. Their atrocious swansong at 1996's Reading Festival saw Brown swan onstage in the same togs he'd been wearing for three days in the bar. Even their own rave in a Widnes park was almost washed out by the rising Mersey."

Kitty Empire writing in The Guardian said the book is "A thorough biography of the Stone Roses that illuminates the bickering and court battles that led to their downfall."

Writing in The Scotsman Fiona Shepherd said "Spence doesn't go to great lengths to assess their cultural impact as one of the UK's most influential and adored bands or to get under the skin of these folk heroes. Even his account of Spike Island, at which he was present as a young journalist, is more forensic than personal."

The New York Times wrote "It struggled to grasp the elusive, magical cultural impact that made them "a band that, for a brief moment, held the future of rock 'n' roll in its hands.""
