= Initial Granada Report =

EP by 808 State
- Released: 12 July 2019
- Studio: Old Granada Studios (Manchester)
- Genre: Acid house, electronic
- Length: 18:46 (Initial Granada Report); 19:36 (Subsequent Granada Report)

808 State chronology
Blueprint (2011)	Initial Granada Report (2019)	Transmission Suite (2019)

Initial Granada Report is a 4-track EP by the British electronic music group 808 State. This EP is their first new material in 17 years, the last new material being in 2002's Outpost Transmission. This is the first of two EPs, and is followed by Subsequent Granada Report; both were made to tease the album Transmission Suite. Both EPs each contain two tracks from the album and two stand-alone tracks.

== Track listing ==
1. "Ujala" – 4:50
2. "Tokyo Tokyo" – 4:52
3. "Planeten" – 5:12
4. "Bataglia" – 3:52

== Subsequent Granada Report ==
Subsequent Granada Report was released on 30 August 2019. With about a total length of 20 minutes, it was the second EP to be released as a tease for their next album, Transmission Suite.

1. "Marconi" – 3:58
2. "The Ludwig Question" – 4:31
3. "Cannonball Waltz" – 5:15
4. "Spiral Arms" – 5:52
