= Transmission Suite (album) =

Studio album by 808 State
- Released: 11 October 2019
- Studio: The Transmission Suite at Old Granada Studios (Manchester)
- Genre: Electronica
- Length: 59:50
- Label: Self-released label

808 State chronology
Initial Granada Report (2019)	Transmission Suite (2019)

Transmission Suite is a 2019 studio album by the British electronic music group, 808 State. It is their seventh studio album, released 17 years after their last album Outpost Transmission. It is also their final to feature Andy Barker, who died on 6 November 2021, leaving Graham Massey as the sole remaining member of the group. Before the album was released, the group produced two EP albums called Initial Granada Report and Subsequent Granada Report both released about five months before the album was released.

Professional ratings
Review scores
Source	Rating
Metacritic	76/100

== Track listing ==
1. "Tokyo Tokyo" – 4:52
2. "Skylon" – 4:41
3. "Cannonball Waltz" – 5:15
4. "The Ludwig Question" – 4:31
5. "Huronic" – 3:46
6. "Landau" – 4:08
7. "Westland" – 3:20
8. "Trinity" – 3:18
9. "Ujala" – 4:51
10. "Carbonade" – 3:49
11. "Pulcenta" – 2:11
12. "Angol Argol" – 4:17
13. "Bushy Bushy" – 3:37
14. "13 13" – 4:01
15. "Crab Claw" – 3:13
