= Let Yourself Go (808 State song) =

Single by 808 State
- Released: 21 November 1988
- Recorded: 1987
- Genre: Acid house
- Length: 6:14
- Label: Creed
- Songwriter(s): Graham Massey, Martin Price, Gerald Simpson
- Producer(s): 808 State

808 State singles chronology
"Let Yourself Go" / "Deepville" (1988)	"Pacific State" (1989)

"Let Yourself Go" is the first 12" single by English electronic music group 808 State, released in 1988. The cover depicts a Matryoshka doll in the shape of a bear.

== Track listing ==
=== Side A ===
1. "Let Yourself Go" (303 Mix) – 6:14
2. "Let Yourself Go" (D 50 Mix) – 4:23

=== Side B ===
1. "Deepville" – 7:24

"Deepville" was originally titled "Sxmatic".

== See also ==
- 1988 in music
