= 808:88:98 =

Album by 808 State

Greatest hits album by 808 State
- Released: 18 May 1998
- Length: 73:43
- Label: ZTT

808 State chronology
Thermo Kings (1996)	808:88:98 (1998)	Outpost Transmission (2002)

Professional ratings
Review scores
Source	Rating
AllMusic	4.5/5 stars

808:88:98 is a greatest hits album by English electronic music group 808 State. It was released on 18 May 1998 by ZTT Records.

== Track listing ==
1. "Pacific 707" – 3:53
2. "Cübik" – 3:33
3. "Cobra Bora" – 6:18
4. "In Yer Face" – 3:55
5. "The Only Rhyme That Bites" (Extended Mix) (featuring MC Tunes) – 4:17
6. "Olympic" (Flutey Mix) – 4:09
7. "Ooops" (featuring Björk) – 4:44
8. "Lift" (EX:EL Mix) – 5:12
9. "One in Ten" (featuring UB40) – 2:41
10. "Plan 9" (LP Mix) – 4:02
11. "10 x 10" (Gorgeous Mix) – 3:33
12. "Bombadin" (Quica Mix) – 4:43
13. "Bond" (featuring Mike Doughty) – 5:06
14. "Azura" (featuring Louise Rhodes) – 5:44
15. "Lopez" (featuring James Dean Bradfield) – 4:31
16. "Crash" – 5:11
17. "Pacific" (808:98) – 5:56

== Pre-album remixes ==
Pacific 808:98 / Cübik:98
- Cover of CD 1

Remix album by 808 State
- Released: 27 April 1998
- Length: 19:26 (part 1); 24:19 (part 2)
- Label: ZTT

Part 2
- Cover of CD 2

Pacific 808:98 / Cübik:98 is a remix album released before 808:88:98. The album is split into two parts.

=== Pacific 808:98 / Cübik:98 [part 1] ===
1. "Pacific:808:98Edit" – 3:36
2. "Pacific:GrooveJeepMix" – 8:22
3. "Pacific:707" – 3:56
4. "Cubik:Original" – 3:35

=== Pacific 808:98 / Cübik:98 [part 2] ===
1. "Cubik:98" – 4:43
2. "Cubik:MonkeyMafiaRemix" – 6:40
3. "Pacific:Original" – 6:28
4. "Pacific:303" – 6:28
