= Newbuild =

Newbuild may refer to:

- Newbuild, or Newbuilding in shipbuilding
- Newbuild, a housing category eligible for Equity sharing in the UK
- Newbuild (album), a 1988 album by 808 State
