= Prebuild (album) =

Compilation album by 808 State
- Released: 4 October 2004
- Recorded: 1987–88
- Genre: Acid house, lo-fi
- Length: 62:51
- Label: Rephlex

808 State chronology
Outpost Transmission (2002)	Prebuild (2004)	Blueprint (2011)

Professional ratings
Review scores
Source	Rating
AllMusic	3.5/5 stars
Uncut	3/5

Prebuild is a compilation album by English electronic music group 808 State, which was released on 4 October 2004 by Rephlex Records. It contains tracks recorded during the Newbuild recording sessions in 1987 and 1988.

== Original track listing ==
1. "Automatic" – 10:36
2. "Ride" – 5:09
3. "Johnnycab" – 5:59
4. "Massagearama" – 5:18
5. "Clonezone" – 3:34
6. "CosaCosa" – 4:06
7. "Sex Mechanic" – 6:55
8. "C.I.S." – 3:19
9. "K.Narcossa" – 3:27
10. "Thermo Kings" – 14:28
