= Quadrastate =

1989 808 State EP

Studio album by 808 State
- Released: 31 July 1989
- Recorded: November 1988 – March 1989
- Length: 28:31
- Label: Creed
- Producer: 808 State

808 State chronology
Newbuild (1988)	Quadrastate (1989)	90 (1989)

Professional ratings
Review scores
Source	Rating
AllMusic	3/5 stars

Quadrastate is a mini-album by the British electronic music group 808 State. It was released in July 1989 through Creed Records. It contains the original version of "Pacific State", one of the most popular tracks by 808 State, which later made the band famous after extended airplay on BBC Radio 1 led to their signing to ZTT Records.

The record entered the Top Dance Albums chart at number 10 on 9 September 1989, and reached number 1 on 4 November.

On 19 May 2008, the British Rephlex Records label re-released the record in double vinyl and CD format.

The re-issued version featured seven additional bonus tracks not included in the original. In addition, there were some alterations to the originally released version, including editing to the track "106".

== Track listing ==
Original 12" mini-album release (1989):

=== Side A ===
1. "Pacific State" – 6:16
2. "106" – 0:48
3. "State Ritual" – 5:53

=== Side B ===
1. "Disco State" – 5:01
2. "Fire Cracker" – 4:41
3. "State to State" – 5:52

==== 2008 CD Tracklist ====
1. "Pacific State"
2. "106"
3. "State Ritual"
4. "Disco State"
5. "Fire Cracker"
6. "State to State"
7. "Let Yourself Go (303 Mix)" – Originally released on 12" as a single in 1989.
8. "Deepville"
9. 808 State vs. Zenarchy - "Got It Huh"
10. "Techclock"
11. "In Yolk" – Early version of "God C.P.U." Hypnotone
12. "State Ritual Scam"
13. "Let Yourself Go (D50 Mix)"

== Personnel ==
- Graham Massey
- Martin Price
- Andy Barker
- Darren Partington
- Gerald Simpson
- Adam Clark
