= Opti buk =

opti buk

Video by 808 State
- Released: 2002
- Recorded: 1989–1997
- Genre: Electronica
- Label: ZTT Records

808 State video chronology
808:90ptical (1991)	opti buk (2002)

opti buk is a DVD by electronic music group 808 State which was released in 2002. Also included is a bonus album, State to State 2, which contains 8 unreleased tracks made between 1994 and 1998. The DVD has been deleted, and only archive copies may be available. The name of the DVD is derived from optical (opti) and book (buk).

== Contents ==
- 17 promo videos
- 15-minute documentary about the G-Mex Turborave gig in Manchester, 1991
- 15 minutes of home movies made by 808 State, including studio footage
- Albums and singles discography
- Bonus CD (State to State 2) containing 8 unreleased tracks

== Video track listing ==
1. "Pacific 707"
2. "Ancodia"
3. "The Only Rhyme That Bites"
4. "Tunes Splits The Atom"
5. "Cubik"
6. "Olympic"
7. "In Yer Face"
8. "Ooops" ('Live' Version)
9. "Ooops" (Iceland Version)
10. "Lift"
11. "Time Bomb"
12. "One In Ten"
13. "Plan 9"
14. "10 x 10"
15. "Bond"
16. "Azura"
17. "Lopez"
