= 808:90ptical =

Video by 808 State
- Released: 1991
- Recorded: 1989–1990
- Genres: Acid house, electronica, alternative dance
- Label: ZTT Records (United Kingdom)

808 State video chronology
808:90ptical (1991)	Opti buk (2002)

808:90ptical is a video compilation by electronic music group 808 State which was released in 1991 on VHS. The videos are a mixture of the band's music videos, animated backgrounds while excerpts of tracks are played, and live footage recorded at "Re-live The Dream", Ku Club, Ibiza, Spain, in September 1990.

== Video Track listing ==
1. "The Fat Shadow (excerpt)"
2. "Cobra Bora (Call The Cops mix)"
3. "Olympic"
4. "Donkey Doctor (excerpt)"
5. "Cubik (similar to Pan Am mix)"
6. "The Only Rhyme That Bites"
7. "Sunrise (excerpt)"
8. "In Yer Face (In Yer Face mix – edit)"
9. "Sunrise (excerpt)"
10. "Tunes Splits The Atom"
11. "Pacific 707"
12. "Pacific (similar to Pacific 303 – excerpt)"
