= Forecast (album) =

Compilation album by 808 State
- Released: 25 May 1993
- Length: 53:17
- Label: ZTT

808 State chronology
| Gorgeous (1993) | Forecast (1993) | Don Solaris (1996) |

Forecast is a compilation album by the English electronic music group 808 State, released on 25 May 1993 by ZTT Records, exclusively in Japan. The album contains a collection of B-sides and remixes from the Gorgeous era.

== Critical reception ==
Professional ratings
Review scores
| Source | Rating |
|---|---|
| AllMusic | 2/5 stars |
| Calgary Herald | B− |
| Martin C. Strong | 6/10 |
| The Virgin Encyclopedia of Eighties Music | 3/5 stars |

The Calgary Herald wrote that "the beats-per-minute do not lash the body like industrial or heavy-duty techno and elements of New Age infiltrate its club world of synthesizer-driven music."

== Original track listing ==
1. "Plan 9" (Choki Galaxy Mix) – 4:45
2. "One in Ten" (808 Original Mix) – 4:19
3. "Reaper Repo" (12" Mix) – 8:27
4. "Plan 9" (Guitars on Fire Mix) – 4:45
5. "One in Ten" (UB40 Full Instrumental) – 5:02
6. "One in Ten" (UB40 Vocal) – 4:03
7. "Nbambi" (The April Showers Mix) – 4:20
8. "Femme Deluxe" – 3:22
9. "Lemon" – 4:52
10. "Purple Dust" – 4:24
11. "Olympic '93" (The Word Mix) – 4:58
