= Andrew Barker (cricketer) =

English cricketer (born 1945)

Personal information
- Full name: Andrew Hunter Barker
- Born: 7 August 1945 (age 81); Salisbury, Wiltshire, England
- Batting: Left-handed
- Bowling: Slow left-arm orthodox

Domestic team information
- Years: Team
- 1982: Wiltshire
- 1972-1973: Minor Counties South
- 1964-1967: Oxford University
- 1963-1973: Wiltshire

Career statistics
Competition	FC	LA
Matches	44	6
Runs scored	864	72
Batting average	14.64	12.00
100s/50s	–/1	–/–
Top score	94	26
Balls bowled	6,966	134
Wickets	70	3
Bowling average	41.51	28.66
5 wickets in innings	2	–
10 wickets in match	–	–
Best bowling	5/42	2/24
Catches/stumpings	24/–	–/–
- Source: Cricinfo, 10 October 2010

Andrew Hunter Barker (born 7 August 1945) is an English former cricketer. Barker was a left-handed batsman who bowled slow left-arm orthodox. He was born at Salisbury, Wiltshire. He was educated at Charterhouse School and later Keble College, Oxford.

In 1963, Barker joined Wiltshire. He made his Minor Counties Championship debut for the county against Berkshire. From 1963 to 1973, he represented the county in 27 Minor Counties Championship matches, the last of which came against Berkshire. Barker also represented Wiltshire in List A cricket. His debut List A match came against Essex in the 1969 Gillette Cup. From 1969 to 1973, he represented the county in 3 List A matches, the last of which came against Hampshire in the 1973 Gillette Cup. During this period he also represented Minor Counties South from 1972 to 1973 in the Benson and Hedges Cup, twice against Gloucestershire and once against Glamorgan. In his combined 6 List A matches, he scored 72 runs at a batting average of 12.00, with a high score of 26. With the ball he took 3 wickets at a bowling average of 28.66, with best figures of 2/24.

Barker made his first-class debut for Oxford University against Gloucestershire in 1964. From 1964 to 1967, he represented the University in 44 first-class matches, the last of which came against Cambridge University at Lord's. In his 44 first-class matches, he scored 864 runs at an average of 14.64, with a single half century score of 94. With the ball he took 70 wickets at an average of 41.51, with 2 five wicket hauls and best figures of 5/42.

In 1982, Barker returned to play for Wiltshire in the 1982 Minor Counties Championship, where he played 3 matches. Two of them were against Oxfordshire and his final match for the county was against Cornwall.
