= Ex:el =

ex:el

Studio album by 808 State
- Released: 4 March 1991
- Recorded: September – December 1990
- Studio: Revolution Studios
- Genres: Electronic dance; sound collage; synth-pop; alternative dance; rave; Tech House; IDM; post-acid house
- Length: 57:32 (UK); 63:34 (US)
- Labels: ZTT; Tommy Boy; Warner Bros.

808 State chronology
| Utd. State 90 (1990) | ex:el (1991) | Gorgeous (1993) |

Singles from ex:el
- 1. "Cubik / Olympic" Released: 1990; 2. "In Yer Face" Released: 1991; 3. "Ooops" Released: 1991; 4. "Lift / Open Your Mind" Released: 1991

Professional ratings
Review scores
| Source | Rating |
|---|---|
| AllMusic | 4/5 stars |
| Drowned in Sound | 7/10 |
| Encyclopedia of Popular Music | 4/5 stars |
| Entertainment Weekly | B+ |
| The Line of Best Fit | 82% |
| MusicHound | 4.5/5 |
| Q | 4/5 stars |
| Record Mirror | 8/10 |
| Select | 4/5 medals |
| Tom Hull – on the Web | B+ |

ex:el is the third studio album by 808 State, released on 4 March 1991 by ZTT Records. In contrast to the band's previous work, the album features more catchy melodies and heavier acid techno beats and percussion, "embracing earlier flirtations with hip-hop and industrial music".

The album also features the guest vocals of Bernard Sumner of Joy Division and New Order, who sings on "Spanish Heart". In addition, Björk sings on "Qmart" and "Ooops", and is credited with co-writing both; this album marked the start of a long-running working relationship between Björk and Graham Massey.

It is considered to be the first major release to feature the sample from the film Willy Wonka & the Chocolate Factory of the phrase "we are the music makers", which became one of the most common vocal samples in electronic music. It is also the first electronic album to feature guest vocals by important alternative rock artists on selected tracks, which became commonplace too on later pop-oriented electronic albums.

Phil Sutcliffe in Q Magazine called the album "irresistibly full of fun"

The album is last to feature founding member Martin Price, who left the group in October 1991 to perform solo production work, eventually forming his own label, Sun Text.

In 2025, The Guardian included the album in their list of "1000 Albums to Hear Before You Die".

== Track listing ==
| No. | Title | Length |
|---|---|---|
| 1. | "San Francisco" | 4:56 |
| 2. | "Spanish Heart" (featuring Bernard Sumner) | 3:51 |
| 3. | "Leo Leo" | 4:01 |
| 4. | "Qmart" (featuring Björk) | 4:58 |
| 5. | "Nephatiti" | 4:50 |
| 6. | "Lift" | 5:12 |
| 7. | "Ooops" (featuring Björk) | 4:41 |
| 8. | "Empire" | 4:20 |
| 9. | "In Yer Face" | 4:54 |
| 10. | "Cubik" | 3:44 |
| 11. | "Lambrusco Cowboy" | 4:05 |
| 12. | "Techno Bell" | 4:56 |
| 13. | "Olympic" | 4:21 |

- "Olympic" was initially only available on the CD version of the album.
- The US version includes an alternate version of "Cubik", subtitled "Tomix", with a duration of 9:28, as track 10.

=== 2008 deluxe edition ===
In September 2008, ex:el was re-released as a 'deluxe edition'. The original album was remastered by Graham Massey, and Ian Peel and Graham Massey compiled a bonus disc of remixes and unreleased tracks which included:

1. "In Yer Face" (Facially Yours Remix) – 4:17
2. "Olympic" (Euro Bass Mix) – 5:44
3. "Lift" (Heavy Mix) – 4:42
4. "Cubik" (State to Pan Am Mix) – 4:29
5. "Open Your Mind" (Sound Garden Mix) – 4:28
6. "Lambrusco Cowboy" (Alt Mix) – 4:17
7. "Ski Family" – 5:14
8. "Ooops" (Mellow Birds Mix) – 4:04
9. "In Yer Face" (Cheadle Royal Mix) – 3:26
10. "Olympic" (Unreleased Mix) – 4:55

== Charts ==
Chart performance for Ex:el
| Chart (2009) | Peak position |
|---|---|
| Australian Albums (ARIA) | 109 |
| UK Albums (Official Charts) | 4 |
