= Andrew Barker (merchant) =

Bristol merchant and privateer

Captain Andrew Barker
- Born: Before 1570; Bristol
- Died: August 1577; Guanaja
- Era: Elizabethan
- Known for: first Englishman in Bay of Honduras
- Relatives: John Barker brother
- Piratical career
- Type: Privateer
- Allegiance: England
- Years active: 1576‍–‍1577
- Rank: Captain
- Base of operations: Bay of Honduras; West Indies
- Commands: Ragged Staffe; Beare

Andrew Barker (d. 1577) was an Bristolian merchant and Elizabethan privateer.

== Career ==
=== Inquisition ===
Barker, of Bristol, in partnership with his brother John, was for some years engaged in the adventurous and often disputed trade with the Spanish in the Canary Islands. In 1570 one of their ships, the Falcon, was seized at Terceira, the cargo (worth £2,600) confiscated, and the greater part of her crew sent to the galleys. In 1574, after having resided in Tenerife for some years, Barker returned to Bristol, leaving John Drue as his resident factor.

The following year, the Spanish Inquisition at Tenerife detained the captain and crew of one of the Barker brothers' ships, the Christopher of Dartmouth (Henry Roberts of Bristol captain), and seized her cargo (worth £1,700), released the captain and crew only upon payment of fines which amounted to the value of the whole cargo. (Note: Inquisitors alleged that Barker had been accused by Charles Chester. Drue, Barker's local factor in Tenerife, was also detained. Roberts's release was mediated by a Spanish friar, and the further payment of £200, which fine Barker discharged (Hakluyt 1600, p. 528).)

=== Expedition ===
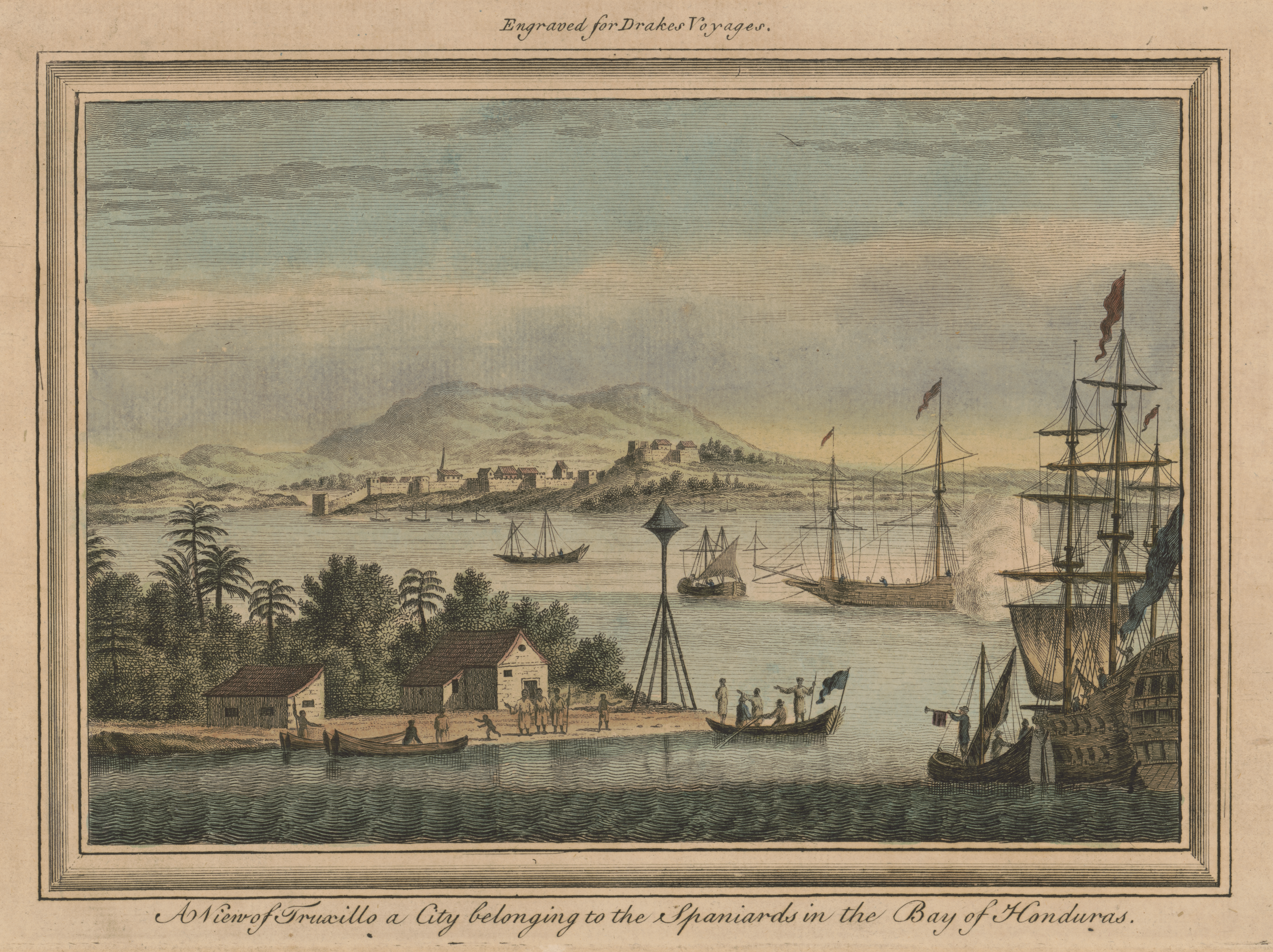
A view of Truxillo Bay and city on the coast of Honduras / 1796 lithograph by Thomas Bowen / via LC

==== Departure ====
Barker thereupon fitted out two ships for a voyage of reprisals against the Spanish in the West Indies—the Ragged Staffe, of which he himself took command, with one Philip Roche as master, and the Beare, commanded by William Coxe of Limehouse. The company sailed from Plymouth on Whitsunday, 1576.

The crew watered at Isla del Sal and Isle of Maio, in the Cape Verde Islands, and (illicitly) traded with Portuguese residents (knives and blades for victuals). In Isle of Maio, Barker's trumpeter was murdered, purportedly by locals, whereupon the crew burnt two villages before making their escape.

==== Cruise ====
===== Southern leg =====
The crew first landed in Trinidad, where they were (reportedly) well received by Ameridian residents, spending five days amongst them. They next cruised near the Isle of Margarita, seizing their first Spanish prize here– four or five tonnes of Canary wine. They next watered at Curaçao, where Spanish and Amerindian residents set upon 14 of the men (non-fatally harming them), forcing the crew to retreat to the Spanish Main. Some days afterwards, Barker and Roche had a falling out, 'upon comparisons made betweene them concerning the knowledge of Navigation, and about other quarels, which quarels afterward were an occasion of further mischiefe.' Setting their differences aside, the company sailed for the Bay of Tulu (18 leagues southwest of Carthagena), where they came upon a frigate laden with £500 of silver and gold. A Spanish man of war (belatedly) chased the men away.

===== Northern leg =====
The Ragged Staffe and the Beare were steered past Nombre de Dios, towards the mouth of the Chagres River, where Barker, seeking to consort with Simerons (runaway African slaves), sent ten men upriver to make contact. These latter returned empty handed, having developed a fever which proved fatal for eight or nine of the crew.

Frustrated, Barker headed to Veragua, where the crew seized a frigate with some gold, 23 Spaniards, and two Flemish passenger or detainees aboard. The former were marooned (or thrown overboard and left to drown), while the latter joined the cruise. Here, the Ragged Staffe was scuttled, having proved leaky, with the Veraguan frigate taking its stead. (Note: Barker's crew would later testify (during a suit brought against them by Andrew's brother, John) that the 23 Spaniards were marooned (Hakluyt 1600, p. 529), but the colonial governor of Veragua reported to the Spanish Crown that they had been thrown overboard, whereupon they drowned (Laughton 2004, para. 2).)

Now, 'by the direction of certaine Indians,' Barker entered the Bay of Honduras. Here, they surprised a Spanish bark laden with plate (worth £100) and provisions. Its passengers were shortly marooned, excepting the scrivano or Secretary of Carthagena, who was freed only after paying a ransom in gold, he 'being a man of some note.' The crew next passed by 'divers Islands', arriving 'at an Island called S. Francisco, being in the mouth of the great bay, called the Honduras.' Here, William Coxe and some of the Beare's crew ('which for certaine causes shalbe namelesse') successfully mutinied, resulting in the stranding of thirty crew-mates, and Barker.

On a certain morning, sixty Spaniards fell upon the stranded crew, killing Barker and eight others. Coxe, still at the Isle of S. Francisco, now took the survivors and made for 'an Island distant from thence a league.' Now safely ensconced, Coxe and the crew resolved raid Trujillo. Consequently, some of the crew, aboard a pinnace (Coxe captain) and a skiff, sailed for that city, while the rest stayed in the island (to recuperate, presumably). In Trujillo, Coxe and company found 'wine and oyle as much as they would, and divers other good things, but no gold nor silver, nor any other treasure which they would confesse.' Presently, a Spanish man of war gave chase, forcing Coxe (aboard the pinnace) to lose the rest of his men (eight mates, in the skiff), and 'what became of them afterward God knoweth.' (Note: Those slain in the Spanish engagement were 'one Wilde of Bristol, and Michael [the crew's] Chirurgian, Richard of Bristol, Thomas Sampoole, Thomas Freeman, Thomas Nightingale, Robert Iackson, Walter Newton.' The captain's boy and one other sustained injuries (Hakluyt 1600, p. 530).) (Note: Laughton 2004, para. 2 suggests that S. Francisco was Guanaja, that the 'Island distant from [S. Francisco] a league' was Roatan, that the Spanish attack occurred in August 1577, and that Barker (or his corpse) was beheaded, with his head being sent to Trujillo as a trophy.)

==== Return ====
Coxe now set sail for England. Some 60 leagues from the Isle of S. Francisco, the men encountered a storm or hurricane, which cost them £2,000 in treasure (which, purportedly, was caught by one of the frigate's sails and blown overboard), and further proved fatal for five mates and Philip Roche (formerly master of the Ragged Staffe), who drowned. The surviving crew finally, 'by the helpe of God,' arrived in the Isle of Silly near Cornwall, on 7 June 1578, with 'ten botisios of oyle, and [...] foure cast Peeces that were in Iohn Oxnams frigat (which the yeere before was taken in the streit of Dariene)[,] three harquebuzes on crocke, certaine calivers, and certaine treasure.' At Silly, the treasure was divided amongst the company, 'to some five pound, to some sixe pound, to some seven pound, to some more, as every man was thought to have deserved.' Upon their (later) arrival at Plymouth, though, some of the crew were imprisoned, John Barker (brother of the late Andrew Barker) having sued them as accessaries to their captain's death, 'and betrayers of him unto the enemie.' Some of the 'chiefe malefactors' were given lengthy sentences, while the rest, 'although they escaped the rigor of mans law, yet could they not avoide the heavy iudgement of God, but shortly after came to miserable ends.'

== Legacy ==
It has been suggested that Barker was the first English privateer to cruise the Bay of Honduras against the Spanish, thereby presaging Peter Wallace and the Baymen by over half a century. (Note: Though non-Spanish pirates or privateers, described simply as Lutherans in Spanish records, raided Puerto Caballos on 13 January 1572 (De la O Torres 2020, p. 287). Furthermore, Gilbert Horseley may have strayed near Trujillo and Puerto Caballos en route to Plymouth from Veragua sometime during April‍–‍June 1575 (Wright 1932, p. xlviii).)

== Notes ==
This article incorporates text from a publication now in the public domain: "Barker, Andrew". Dictionary of National Biography. London: Smith, Elder & Co. 1885–1900.
