= Thermo Kings =

Remix album by 808 State
- Released: 21 December 1996 (Japan)
- Length: 56:42
- Label: ZTT; WEA; Hypnotic
- Producer: 808 State

808 State chronology
Don Solaris (1996)	Thermo Kings (1996)	808:88:98 (1998)

Professional ratings
Review scores
Source	Rating
AllMusic	2.5/5 stars

Thermo Kings is a 1996 remix album by the British electronic music group 808 State.

== Track listing ==
1. "Joyrider" (A Natural Mix by 808state) – 7:00
2. "Balboa" (A Paranormal Mix by 808state) – 6:14
3. "Azura" (An Ultramarine Mix by 808state) – 5:50
4. "Azura" (A Fiendish Mix by Dillinja) – 6:18
5. "Lopez" (A Metamorphic Mix by Brian Eno) – 6:23
6. "Lopez" (A Direct Neural Mix by the Propellerheads) – 6:44
7. "Paradan" (A Paranoid Mix by 808state) – 5:01
8. "Spanish Marching" (A Gala Mix by 808state) – 5:44
9. "Goa" (A Pagan Mix by 808state) – 4:07
10. "Pump" (A Mesmer Mix by 808state) – 3:21
