= Spike Island (concert) =

1990 concert by the Stone Roses

The promotional poster for the concert

Spike Island was a concert by English rock band The Stone Roses held on 27 May 1990 at Spike Island in Widnes. The concert is considered a seminal moment for the Britpop movement. Noel Gallagher of Oasis described the concert as "the blueprint for my band." The BBC wrote that "it has become one of rock music's most mythologised gigs."

30,000 people attended the concert, about 28,000 paying revellers and 2,000 gatecrashers. The pop band Pulp has released two songs using the concert as a theme, "Sorted for E's and Wizz" and "Spike Island". A film about the concert called Spike Island was released in 2012, and there was a tribute concert held on the island in 2021.

== Location ==
The concert was held at Spike Island, Widnes, on 27 May 1990. During the 19th century the island was at the centre of the British chemical industry, the industry was unregulated and brought exceptional levels of pollution. Widnes was described as one of the most dirty and dangerous places to work in the country, and as a "poisonous hell-town". Everett True of Melody Maker went to the concert and wrote that the location was grim, and that he felt like he was a character in a Lowry painting or should be checking in to begin work at a factory. Bob Stanley of Melody Maker described Spike Island as a horrible field surrounded by huge electricity pylons, factories and chemical plants. He wrote "Your hair felt very odd and greasy, like it was totally coated with chemicals from the factories."

The lead singer of the Stone Roses, Ian Brown, said that "We wanted to do something outside the rock'n'roll norm and do it in a venue which had never been used for that sort of thing before. We started out doing warehouse parties and we still had that mentality where we wanted to play different venues."

Gareth Evans, Stone Roses manager, came up with the idea of using Spike Island". Classic Pop Magazine wrote "staging this behemothic, epochal gig at a former toxic waste dump came as much from their chaotic, wildly capricious manager than it was a middle finger to the rock'n'roll establishment." John Robb remarked that Evans was an old-school manager who made it up as he went along.

== Promotion ==
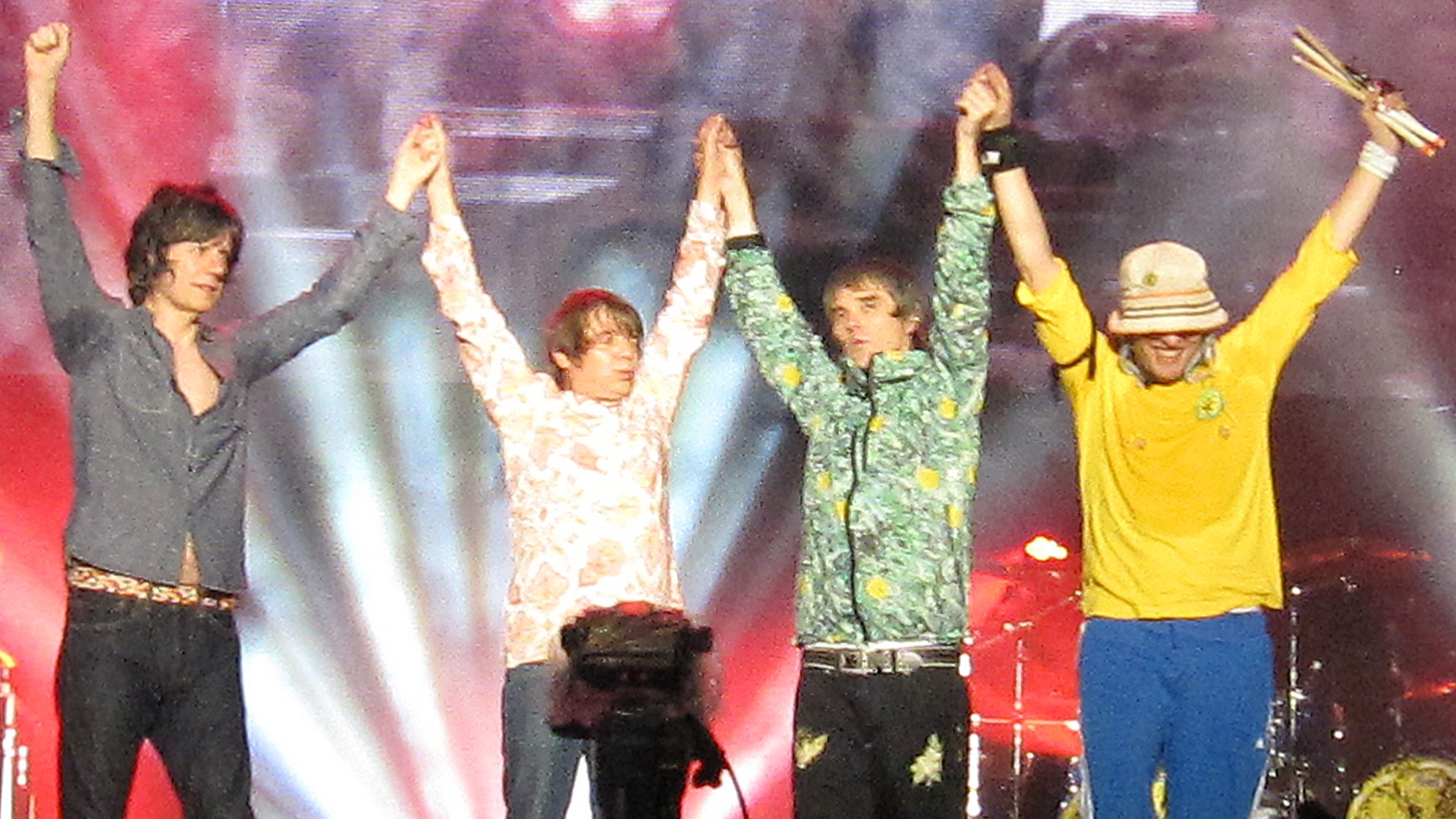
The Stone Roses in 2012

Anticipation for the concert was high, the Stone Roses had not played live for 6 months because a court case was hanging over them, and it was uncertain whether they would ever play live again. The band's record company, FM Revolver, had re-released the song Sally Cinnamon with an unofficial video and without the band's permission, so the group had vandalised the offices of their record label boss, Paul Birch, and daubed paint on his girlfriend. The band members were arrested and charged with criminal damage, appearing before magistrates in March 1990. In October 1990 the band members appeared in court and were fined £3,000 each.

A press conference was held the day before the concert in Manchester but the BBC and ITV news crews refused to cover the conference because Evans attempted to charge them for access. The band themselves were described as surly and uncommunicative during the conference.

== The concert ==
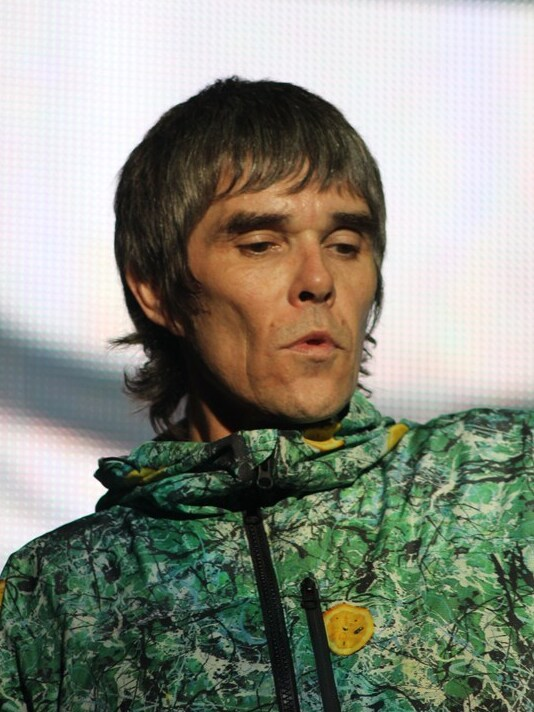
Ian Brown

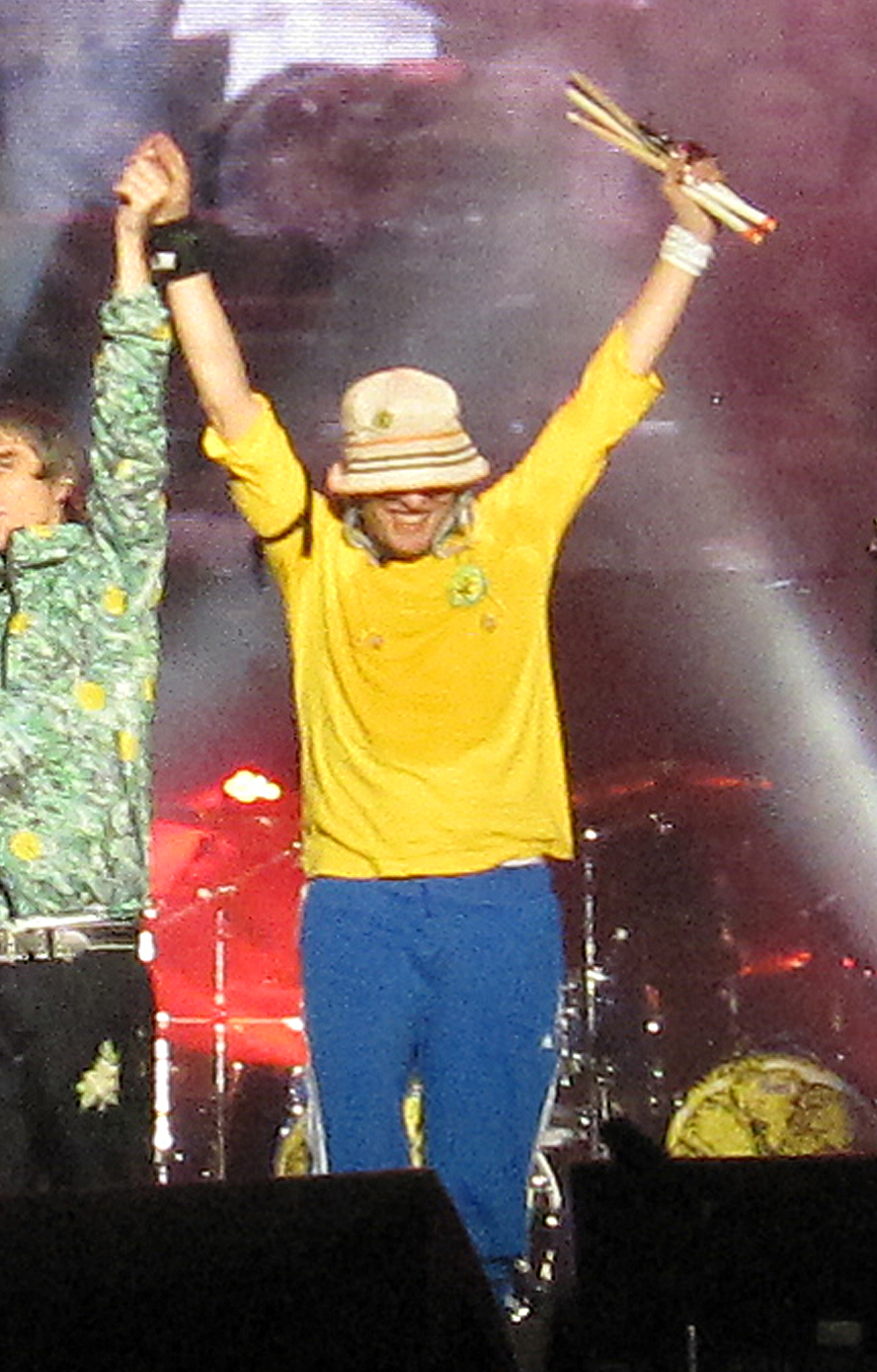
Reni wearing a bucket hat

The band were scheduled to arrive by helicopter, but Evans arrived by helicopter first and further landings were deemed unsafe. So the band arrived in a minivan driven by Steve "Adge" Atherton, their tour manager. The band members on stage were Ian Brown (lead vocals), John Squire (lead guitars), Alan Wren (drums) and Gary Mounfield (bass guitars). While not a band member Steve "Cressa" Cresser was on stage as a dancer. He had been employed by John Squire to assist with guitar effect changes, but over time his role had evolved.

The Stone Roses played the songs below, in the order noted. One Love was a new song that made its debut at the concert, it was released as a single one month later.

- I Wanna Be Adored
- Elephant Stone
- She Bangs The Drums
- Shoot You Down
- One Love
- Sally Cinnamon
- (Song For My) Sugar Spun Sister
- Standing Here
- Fools Gold
- Where Angels Play
- Waterfall
- Don’t Stop
- Something’s Burning
- Made Of Stone
- Elizabeth My Dear
- I Am The Resurrection

The band became associated wtih bucket hats, band member "Reni" wore them routinely with other members wearing them occasionally, so at the concert many people in the crowd were wearing them. Steve Cresser, the band's dancer, had inspired them to wear flared trousers. One journalist travelling to Manchester to interview the quartet was taken by Brown to a clothes shop. He explained that here "he would source the baggy leg-wear that was becoming, along with Reni's bucket hats, a signature of the group."

The support act DJs included Dave Booth who was the lead DJ at two of their other concerts, but one of several at Spike Island. The other DJs were Dave Haslam, Paul Oakenfold, MC Tunes and MVITA (Manchester Vibes In The Area). The band had intended to book DJ Frankie Knuckles but a mix up occurred and instead they booked Frankie Bones. A ska/rock/reggae fusion band called Ruff Ruff & Ready played and the reggae artist Gary Clail. Thomas Mapfumo was booked, his set was described as excellent but his Zimbabwe political dissident message was unsuited for the crowd he was facing.

Thirty thousand people attended the concert, however, the Stone Roses had no experience of staging a concert on this scale resulting in organisational problems; there were too few toilets, no official merchandise was on sale, sandwiches and beer were confiscated by security guards and people scaled the fences to gatecrash. As the Stone Roses took to the stage a cloud of red dust formed in front of the stage, triggering asthma attacks among some members of the crowd. The audio system at the concert caused sound production problems. Phil Jones, the concert promoter, blamed the council who he said mandated a certain decibel level." A firework display concluded the night. Farout magazine wrote "the chaotic nature of the event has only added to its legend".

The concert demonstrated that indie groups could put on much bigger shows and heralded a new era of large outdoor events that was exploited by later bands. The Stone Roses made no profit from the concert but they did make a piece of history.

== Reception ==
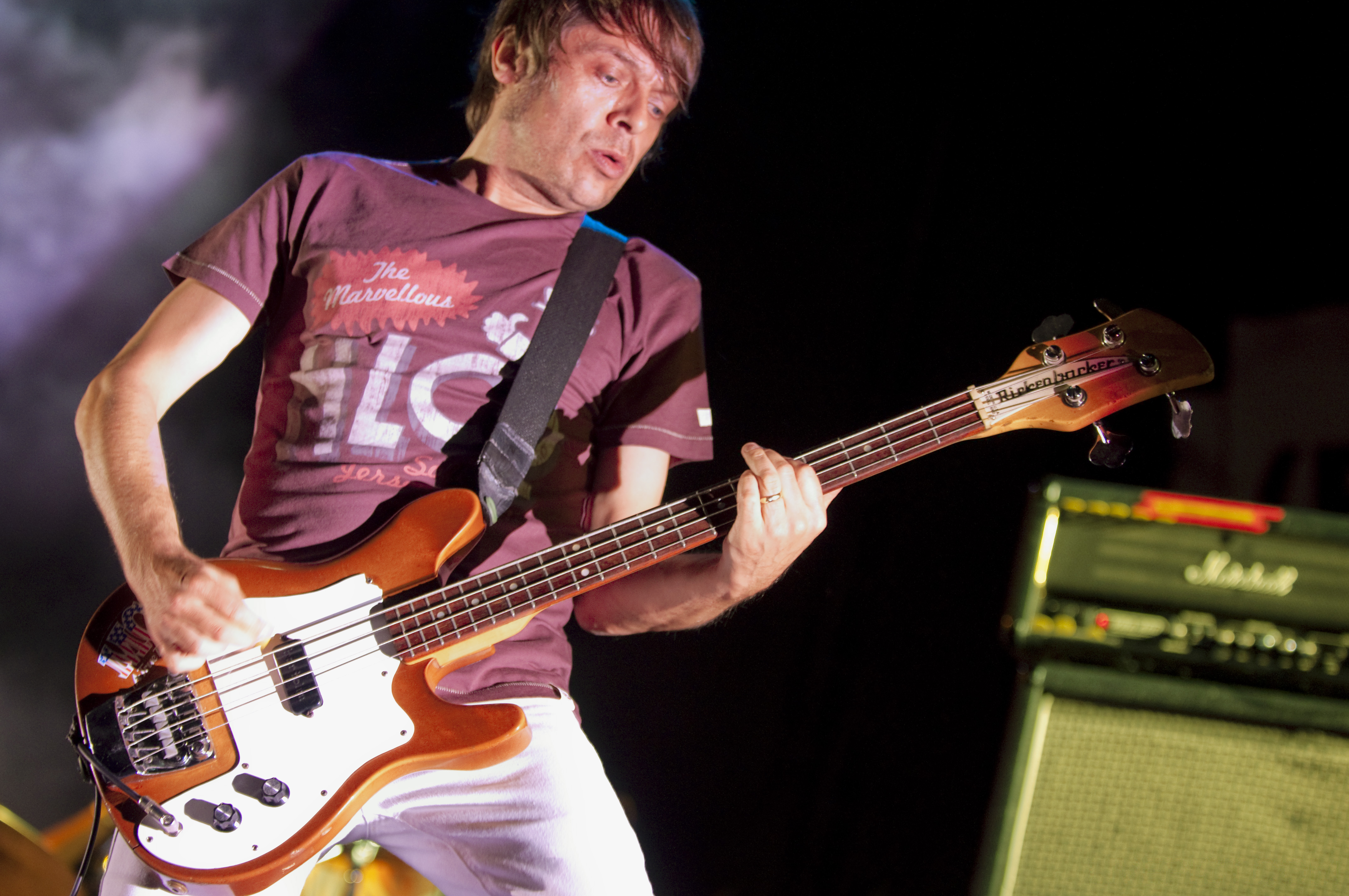
Mani in 2009

The Face magazine dedicated a 12 page spread to the concert titled "The Third Summer of Love" in their July 1990 issue, they described Spike Island as the birth of a new scene, a blend of pop music, fashion and football, and a new type of music - funky rock with psychedelic overtones that was easy to dance along to. On the cover of the magazine was a teenage Kate Moss, then unknown, the photograph helped her to become a supermodel. The magazine had intended to use an image of the concert on its cover but upon reviewing the available pictures decided none were good enough. The issue has become one of magazines most sought after publications.

The NME wrote "Spike Island was to be the Roses' defining statement, a celebration of not only their own success, but of an entire youth culture" and also "It was a real moment in time; the beginning of a long hot summer that saw England nearly go all the way in the World Cup, the peak of a period when Manchester and the north-west felt like the centre of the universe."

Everett True in his review for Melody Maker discussed sound production problems that marred the experience. Finishing his article with the comment "Spike Island was an event, and events, even if they are disasters at the time, are what count."

Jon Ronson said "It didn’t feel to me like the start of something as the end of it – the ideal place to bring down the curtain on what it had been. The record had been out for a year by then, and because the Roses didn’t release another record for so many years afterwards, it framed perfectly the summit of what they’d become and what they meant to people."

== Legacy ==
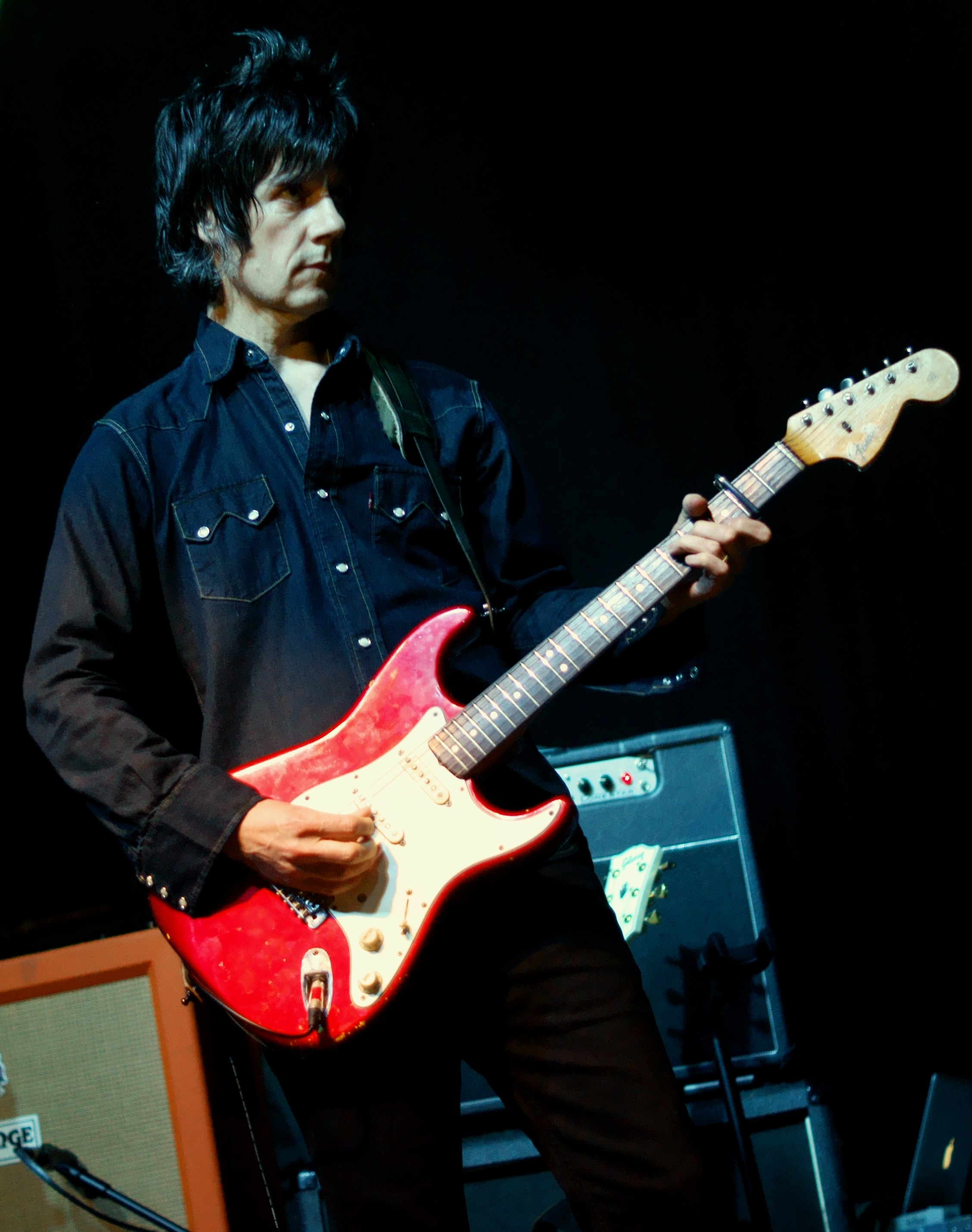
John Squire

The BBC wrote that "it has become one of rock music's most mythologised gigs." The Herald wrote that Spike Island was like Woodstock for the rave generation - a religious experience. A new sound and scene was born by blending indie guitar rock with Acid House energy. Graham Reid wrote that the Stone Roses "played their 1990 game-changing show and birthed Britpop." Noel Gallagher of Oasis saw the concert and described it as the blueprint for his band. It was the beginning of a new era where indie bands played to much larger crowds. Six years later Oasis would be at Knebworth House in front of 250,000 people with John Squire invited onto the stage to play guitars during the song Champagne Supernova.

The Pulp song "Sorted for E's & Wizz" is inspired by one girl's memories of the concert. Jarvis Cocker remarked that he'd spoken to the girl about the concert and she could remember virtually nothing apart from the drug taking. In 2025, Pulp released their second song about the concert, "Spike Island". Thom Donovan, reviewing the song in American Songwriter, wrote "the legend around the disappointing concert provides Cocker with a metaphor for how nostalgia polishes bad memories." The song's co-writer Jason Buckle of the band All Seeing I, attended the gig and recalled a DJ who between every song said, 'Spike Island come alive, Spike Island come alive', and consequently he used those words for the chorus.

A film about the concert called Spike Island was released in 2012. The film is a comedy and coming-of-age drama that focuses on a "wannabee" band who idolise the Stone Roses and set out to deliver their demo tape personally to the Roses at the concert. Emma Dibdin of Digital Spy wrote that within its limited remit it is an affable watch, but the "domestic drama our heroes are running from never resonates". Dibdin added that the "performances are charming, and within the predictable tropes there are genuinely powerful moments." Mat Whitecross, director of the film, discovered varying accounts of the gig during his research, he heard that it was a magical night and a disaster. Remarking that most gigs are forgotten the next day, and few can be remembered 30 years later."

A tribute concert on the island by "the Clone Roses" was planned for May 2020, thirty years after the original concert. The event was rescheduled for 2021 as public gatherings were prohibited because of the COVID-19 pandemic. The music festival took place on 24 July 2021; it was called "Spike Island: The Resurrection" and was headlined by the Clone Roses, with other 1990s tribute bands such as Oas-is, Happy Mondaze and True Order also featuring.

The concert wasn't officially recorded but a crew member, Martin Cornell, recorded the concert unofficially. Three hours of video footage, including a soundcheck on 26 May 1990, and preparations, came to light in 2024 and may be used in a documentary film about the concert. The documentary is being developed by freelance journalist Matt Mead and director and producer Paul Crompton. In December 2008, Martin's brother David Cornell began uploading nine short clips from the video footage to YouTube. In the 2013 Shane Meadows documentary, The Stone Roses: Made of Stone, a DVD extra includes 10 minutes of this video footage.
