= Gorgeous (808 State album) =

Studio album by 808 State
- Released: 1 February 1993
- Length: 56:29
- Labels: ZTT; Tommy Boy; Warner Bros.
- Producer: 808 State

808 State chronology
| Ex:el (1991) | Gorgeous (1993) | Forecast (1993) |

Professional ratings
Review scores
| Source | Rating |
|---|---|
| AllMusic | 3/5 stars |
| Calgary Herald | B− |
| The Encyclopedia of Popular Music | 3/5 stars |
| Los Angeles Times | 2.5/4 stars |
| MusicHound Rock: The Essential Album Guide | 3.5/5 stars |
| NME | 7/10 |
| The Philadelphia Inquirer | 3/4 stars |
| Select | 3/5 medals |

Gorgeous is the fourth studio album by the English electronic music group 808 State. It was released on 1 February 1993 by ZTT Records in the UK and Tommy Boy Records in the US. In October 2008, the album was reissued on ZTT Records and an additional bonus disc, containing 14 remixed tracks, including an unreleased edit of the song "Bombadin".

The album peaked at No. 17 on the UK Albums Chart and No. 35 on the US Top Heatseekers albums chart.

It is their first album to not feature founding member Martin Price, who left the group in October 1991 to perform solo production work, eventually forming his own label, Sun Text.

== Critical reception ==
Select gave the album a three out of five rating, stating that it is "never more nor less than 'interesting'" and concluding that "the weaknesses of over-familiarity are fully apparent" and "too often leaves you wanting more". The Washington Post wrote that "the thumping beats of 'Colony' or the hip-hopped 'Timebomb' are lively enough, and 'Plan 9' does have moments that qualify as gorgeous, but the notable tracks all involve outsiders: Ian McCulloch helps the State create a New Order-ly song on 'Moses', Caroline Seaman's multi-tracked vocals define the Cocteau Twins-ish 'Europa' and 'One in Ten' is an unsurprising remix of the early UB40 single". The Baltimore Sun stated: "Even though the 808-ers' taste in electronics doesn't quite conform to classical notions of aural beauty, like many synth-heavy dance acts these days, they adore the buzz of sawtooth waves and the hiss of cheap drum machines, there's something undeniably luscious about the soundscapes here".

== Track listing ==
1. "Plan 9" – 4:02
2. "Moses" (featuring Ian McCulloch) – 2:54
3. "Contrique" – 3:40
4. "10 X 10" (featuring Barrington Stewart and Rachel McFarlane) – 3:33
5. "One in Ten" (Remix) – 2:40
6. "Europa" (featuring Caroline Seaman) – 4:16
7. "Orbit" – 4:01
8. "Black Morpheus" – 4:04
9. "Southern Cross" – 5:03
10. "Nimbus" – 4:34
11. "Colony" – 4:45
12. "Timebomb" – 2:55
13. "Stormin Norman" – 3:23
14. "Sexy Dancer" – 3:00
15. "Sexy Synthesizer" – 3:39

=== Deluxe edition ===
1. "Freak" (Astroban Mix) – 6:43
2. "Lemon" (Oberheim 4 Mix) – 4:47
3. "La Luz" (Acid Mix) – 5:35
4. "Icecream On Elm Street" (Sex Synth) – 3:43
5. "Mondonet" – 4:52
6. "Reaper Repo" (12" Mix) – 8:28
7. "Bombadin" (Unreleased Edit) – 4:34
8. "Marathon" (Original 2 Four Pub Mix) – 6:15
9. "Insane Lover" (Analogue Mix) – 6:02
10. "The Jackson Fraction" (Jaco Taco Mix) – 5:25
11. "Timebomb" (Oldham Mix) – 3:53
12. "10 X 10" (Vox) – 4:08
13. "Plan 9" (Memory Moog Mix) – 4:21
14. "Nbambi" (March Hare Mix) – 4:20

== Charts ==
Chart performance for Gorgeous
| Chart (1993) | Peak position |
|---|---|
| UK Albums (Official Charts) | 17 |
