= Newbuild (album) =

Studio album by 808 State
- Released: September 1988
- Recorded: January 1988
- Genre: Acid house
- Length: 39:39
- Label: Creed
- Producer: Graham Massey; Martin Price; Gerald Simpson

808 State chronology
Newbuild (1988)	Quadrastate (1989)

Newbuild is the debut studio album by English electronic music group 808 State, released in September 1988 by Creed Records. It was the only album recorded with founding member Gerald Simpson, who departed shortly afterward for a solo career.

== Production ==
The album was recorded at Spirit Studios in Manchester. The group recorded the album on tape found discarded outside the BBC's Manchester studios. It had been recorded on and edited many times; meaning it would no longer meet the organization's quality requirements. The group used a lot of Roland equipment including a TR808, TR909, TB303, a Juno 106 and four SH101s. One technique used was 'silhouetting' where the group would build a track around an atmospheric sample, then remove the sample from the final cut. The album was named after a local council housing project.

== Reception and legacy ==
Professional ratings
Review scores
Source	Rating
AllMusic	4.5/5 stars
Alternative Press	4/5
OffBeat	4/5 stars
Pitchfork	9.8/10

In a 1988 review, OffBeat described the album as "compulsive stuff, you don't exactly listen to it, more like feeel the frequencies... and respond." In 1999, Alternative Press called it an "artificial dystopia" in which the tracks "strip away the soul of Detroit techno and replace it with a cold and rhythmic paranoia."

Later techno artists Aphex Twin and Autechre have saluted the album as a major influence. The former reissued the album on his Rephlex label in 1999. He stated: "It was the next step after Chicago acid, and as much as I loved that, I could relate much better to 808 State. It seemed colder and more human at the same time." He also produced a remix of "Flow Coma", which appeared on his 2001 EP 2 Remixes by AFX.

A collection of unreleased material from the era was released in 2004 as Prebuild.

== Track listing ==
1. "Sync/Swim" – 6:20
2. "Flow Coma" – 6:01
3. "Dr. Lowfruit (4 A.M. Mix)" – 7:36
4. "Headhunters" – 5:02
5. "Narcossa" – 5:17
6. "E Talk" – 4:01
7. "Compulsion" – 5:22

== Personnel ==
- Performer, writer – Gerald Simpson, Graham Massey, Martin Price
- Engineer – Graham Massey
- Artwork – Metropark
- Design – Johnson & Panas
