= Don Solaris =

Studio album by 808 State
- Released: 17 June 1996
- Genre: Acid house; electro; jungle; trip hop
- Length: 55:41; 67:21 (Japan)
- Label: ZTT
- Producer: 808 State

808 State chronology
Forecast (1993)	Don Solaris (1996)	Thermo Kings (1996)

Professional ratings
Review scores
Source	Rating
AllMusic	4/5 stars
Muzik	2/5 stars

Don Solaris is a 1996 studio album by the British electronic music group 808 State, their fifth studio album overall. In October 2008, the album was reissued on ZTT Records with an additional bonus disc of unreleased and remixed tracks.

== Track listing ==
=== Standard edition ===
1. "Intro" – 1:16
2. "Bond" (featuring Mike Doughty) – 5:09
3. "Bird" – 3:53
4. "Azura" (featuring Louise Rhodes) – 5:30
5. "Black Dartagnon" – 5:30
6. "Joyrider" – 4:40
7. "Lopez" (featuring James Dean Bradfield) – 4:17
8. "Balboa" – 5:14
9. "Kohoutek" – 4:46
10. "Mooz" (featuring Ragga) – 4:35
11. "Jerusahat" – 5:12
12. "Banacheq" – 5:39
13. "Bonded" – 5:50*
14. "Chisler" – 5:50*

* – Appear on Japanese release only

=== Deluxe edition disc 2 ===
1. "Spanish Marching" (Fonphone Mix) – 5:58
2. "Joyrider" (A Natural Mix) – 7:01
3. "Baton Rouge" (Cajun Mix) – 5:48
4. "Lopez" (Instrumental) – 4:25
5. "Mondays" (Part One) – 4:56
6. "Relay" (Wool Hall Mix One) – 2:54
7. "Goa" – 4:09
8. "Bonded" – 5:51
9. "Paradan" – 5:03
10. "The Chisler" – 5:49
11. "Lopez" (Brian Eno Mix) – 6:25
12. "Joyrider" (Sure Is Pure Remix) – 11:02

== Charts ==
Chart performance for Don Solaris
Chart (1996)	Peak position
UK Albums (OCC)	88
