= The Reno, Manchester =

Former nightclub in Manchester, England

Coordinates: 53°27′33.17″N 2°14′42.11″W

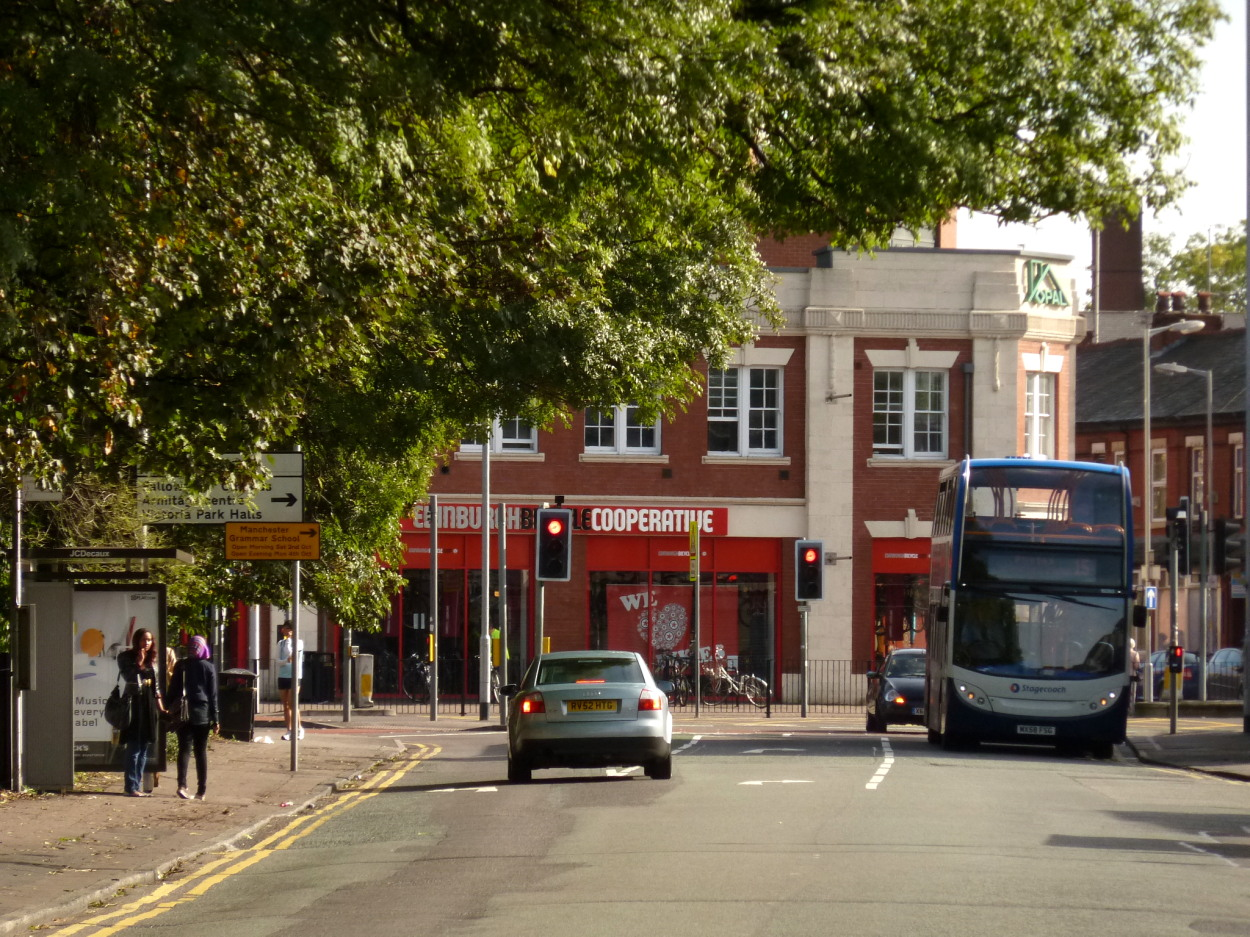
Moss Lane East today

The Reno was a late night club in Moss Side, Manchester, England. The Reno and the Nile (upstairs from the Reno) were Manchester's most famous drinking clubs for the city's West Indian community and played a key role in the development of black culture in the city.

It was located at the corner of Princess Road and Moss Lane East.

In 2017 the remains of the club were excavated.

== History ==
The Reno was started by Phil Magbotiwan in 1962, initially as a Salvation Army hostel for African seamen. Before then it was a club called "The Palm Beach", which was run by Roland West. The Reno was in the downstairs of the building, with the Nile Club upstairs.

In the early days, there was live music with calypso bands, including the tenor sax player and band leader Lord Kitchener, and the West Indian cricketer Clive Lloyd was a regular visitor.

Both clubs were often open until 5 am or 6 am.

The clubs closed in 1986 and the building was demolished. However the site was just filled in and not completely destroyed and in 2017 it was excavated. The intention is to exhibit remains at a temporary exhibition at Whitworth Art Gallery and then permanently at Manchester Museum.

== See also ==
- Modern ruins
