= 90 (album) =

Studio album by 808 State
- Released: 4 December 1989
- Genres: Acid house; dance; techno; electropop
- Length: 39:14
- Label: ZTT
- Producer: 808 State

808 State chronology
Quadrastate (1989)	90 (1989)	Utd. State 90 (1990)

90 is the second studio album by British electronic group 808 State, released on 4 December 1989 as their first album on ZTT Records. The album features the single "Pacific State", which reached number 10 on the UK Singles Chart in November 1989. 90 was released in the United States as Utd. State 90, without "The Fat Shadow (Pointy Head Mix)", but with other bonus tracks.

== Critical reception ==
Professional ratings
Review scores
Source	Rating
AllMusic	4.5/5 stars
The Encyclopedia of Popular Music	4/5 stars
Drowned in Sound	8/10
NME	10/10
Q	4/5 stars
Record Collector	5/5 stars
Record Mirror	4.8080808/5
Sounds	3.5/5 stars

Slant Magazine listed the album at number 54 on its list of the "Best Albums of the 1980s", calling it a "thrilling expansion of the possibilities for acid house and arguably the best LP ever produced in the style". The album was also included in the book 1001 Albums You Must Hear Before You Die.

== Track listing ==
1. "Magical Dream" (features vocals from Vanessa Sherrington) – 3:52
2. "Ancodia" – 5:47
3. "Cobra Bora" – 6:36
4. "Pacific 202" – 5:43
5. "Donkey Doctor" – 5:24
6. "808080808" – 4:20
7. "Sunrise" – 6:33
8. "The Fat Shadow" (Pointy Head Mix) – 0:59

=== 2008 deluxe edition ===
In September 2008, 90 was re-released as a "deluxe edition", the original album remastered by Graham Massey, and Ian Peel and Graham Massey compiled a bonus disc of remixes and tracks, of which were previously exclusive to Utd. State 90, which included:

1. "Pacific" (Britmix) – 4:23
2. "Cobra Bora" (Call the Cops Mix) – 4:53
3. "Donkey Doctor" (Gmex Mix) – 4:45
4. "Boneyween" – 6:12
5. "Kinky National" – 4:01
6. "State to State" – 5:56
7. "Revenge of the Girlie Men" – 4:13
8. "Magical Dream" (Instrumental) – 5:09

== Charts ==
Chart performance for 90
Chart (2007–2008)	Peak position
Australian Albums (ARIA)	97
UK Albums (Official Charts)	57
