= Outpost Transmission =

Studio album by 808 State
- Released: 13 November 2002
- Studio: Testa Rossa Studios (Manchester)
- Genre: Electronica
- Length: 68:21 (UK); 69:57 (US); 73:23 (Japan)
- Label: Bad News; Circus; Shadow

808 State chronology
808:88:98 (1998)	Outpost Transmission (2002)	Prebuild (2004)

Professional ratings
Review scores
Source	Rating
AllMusic	3/5 stars
Drowned in Sound	8/10

Outpost Transmission is a studio album by the British electronic music group 808 State, released in 2002. It is their sixth studio album, and their first new material since 1996's Thermo Kings.

Guests on this album were: Simon Lord (Simian) on "606", Guy Garvey (Elbow) on "Lemonsoul", and Larry Love (Alabama 3) on "Crossword".

It is also their final studio recording to feature Darren Partington, as he left the band after being jailed for 18 months in January 2015 for dealing heroin and crack cocaine.

== UK track listing ==
1. "606" (featuring Simian) – 4:58
2. "Chopsumwong" – 5:18
3. "Wheatstraw" – 4:54
4. "Boogieman" – 4:40
5. "Roundbum Mary" – 3:44
6. "Lemonsoul" (featuring Guy Garvey) – 3:20
7. "Suntower" – 5:56
8. "Dissadis" – 5:53
9. "Bent" – 4:59
10. "Souflex" – 4:58
11. "Crossword" (featuring Larry Love) – 2:58
12. "Lungfoo" – 4:29
13. "Slowboat" – 5:16
14. "Yoyo" – 6:58

== US track listing ==
1. "606" (featuring Simian) – 4:58
2. "Chopsumwong" – 5:18
3. "Wheatstraw" – 4:54
4. "Lemonsoul" (featuring Guy Garvey) – 3:20
5. "Suntower" – 5:56
6. "Bent" – 4:59
7. "Souflex" – 4:58
8. "Crossword" (featuring Larry Love) – 2:58
9. "Lungfoo" – 4:29
10. "Quincy's Lunch" – 5:02
11. "Dissadis" – 5:53
12. "Doctors and Nurses" – 6:39
13. "Brown Sauce" – 5:33
14. "Long Orange (Testa)" – 5:00

== Japanese track listing ==
1. "606" (featuring Simian) – 4:58
2. "Chopsumwong" – 5:18
3. "Wheatstraw" – 4:54
4. "Boogieman" – 4:40
5. "Roundbum Mary" – 3:44
6. "Lemonsoul" (featuring Guy Garvey) – 3:20
7. "Suntower" – 5:56
8. "Dissadis" – 5:53
9. "Bent" – 4:59
10. "Souflex" – 4:58
11. "Crossword" (featuring Larry Love) – 2:58
12. "Lungfoo" – 4:29
13. "Slowboat" – 5:16
14. "Yoyo" – 6:58
15. "Quincy's Lunch" – 5:02

== O.T.E.P. ==
In 2012, the band released a free EP with four tracks from the Japanese and North America versions of the album.

1. "Long Orange" (Testa) – 5:02
2. "Doctors & Nurses" – 6:41
3. "Quincy's Lunch" (Testa) – 5:04
4. "Brown Sauce" – 5:33
