= In Yer Face =

Single by 808 State

from the album Ex:el
- Released: 1991
- Genre: Electronic; trip hop; acid house; techno
- Length: 5:00 (album version); 3:53 (radio edit)
- Label: ZTT; WEA
- Songwriters: 808 State (Graham Massey, Andrew Barker, Martin Price, Darren Partington)
- Producer: 808 State

808 State singles chronology
"Cubik/Olympic" (1990)	"In Yer Face" (1991)	"Oooops" (1991)

"In Yer Face" is a song by English electronic music group 808 State, released in 1991 by ZTT and WEA as the second single from their third album, Ex:el (1991). The song peaked at number nine on the UK Singles Chart.

== Track listings ==
- 7" vinyl

A. "In Yer Face" (Edit)
B. "Leo Leo"

- 12" vinyl

A. "In Yer Face" (In Yer Face Mix)
B. "Leo Leo" (featuring Raagman)

- Remix version
1. "In Yer Face" (Facially Yours Remix)
2. "Leo Leo" (Poonchanting Instrumental)
- 12" promo

A1. "In Yer Face" (In Yer Face Mix)
A2. "In Yer Face" (Facially Yours Remix)
B1. "Leo Leo" (featuring Raagman)
B2. "Leo Leo" (Poonchanting Instrumental)

- CD single
1. "In Yer Face" (Edit)
2. "In Yer Face" (In Yer Face Mix)
3. "Leo Leo" (featuring Raagman)
- Cassette single
1. "In Yer Face" (Edit)
2. "Leo Leo" (Edit)

== Charts ==
Chart (1991)	Peak position
UK Singles (OCC)	9
UK Airplay (Music Week)	58
UK Dance (Music Week)	7
