= Pacific State (song) =

Single by 808 State
- Released: 21 November 1989
- Genre: Ambient house; Balearic beat; acid house; techno
- Length: 3:53 (7" edit also known as "Pacific 707"); 6:29 (Quadrastate version known as "Pacific State"); 5:36 (90 version also known as "Pacific 202")
- Label: ZTT
- Songwriters: Gerald Simpson; 808 State
- Producer: 808 State

808 State singles chronology
"Let Yourself Go" / "Deepville" (1988)	"Pacific State" (1989)	"The Extended Pleasure of Dance (EP)" (1990)

"Pacific" is a single by the English electronic music group 808 State, released in November 1989 by ZTT Records. It exists in various mix versions known by different titles, such as "Pacific State" (as included on the Quadrastate mini-album that year) and "Pacific 202" (as included on the album 90). The song charted for 11 weeks in the United Kingdom, peaking at number ten on the UK Singles Chart. In 2022, Rolling Stone ranked "Pacific State" among the "200 Greatest Dance Songs of All Time".

== Background and release ==
Gerald Simpson began working on the track before leaving 808 State in 1989, after which it was released and entered the charts. However, according to Simpson, they had finished and released the track without his permission. Although Simpson was credited on its first release on the album Quadrastate both as a writer and co-producer, the dispute escalated as Simpson claimed to have written the entire track.

According to 808 State leader Graham Massey, "Pacific" was "the last track at The Haçienda for the six months before it even got out. Then Gary Davies heard it in Ibiza and started playing it on daytime Radio 1. A few features made it stand out: the birdsong and the saxophone. I played the sax part – which is good because I didn't really play saxophone at the time. It's a moot point whether I can play that part properly now."

== Release and legacy ==
There are many variations and remixes of the song. The remix called "Pacific 707" would be released as a single by ZTT in 1989 and "Pacific 202" would be released on their album 90. Though, many versions of the song are still performed by the band during live shows.

The single was released by Tommy Boy Records on 15 March 1990 in the United States.

In retrospective reviews, The Independent reviewed a live concert by 808 State in 1997, describing "Pacific State" as "the song that made a nation chill out. Mellow but insistent beats, a light garnishing of wildlife noises, and a soprano sax threading through it like a viper in the Eden undergrowth. It was the aural equivalent of throwing a party inside a giant flotation tank. That was 808 State." In 2022, Rolling Stone ranked the song number 107 in their list of the "200 Greatest Dance Songs of All Time". In 2025, Billboard magazine ranked it number 22 in their list of "The 50 Best House Songs of All Time".

"Pacific"'s iconic bird sample, a recording of a loon, was popularized by the song, and went on to be used in many other electronic songs such as Lady Gaga's "Babylon".

== Charts ==
=== Weekly charts ===
Chart (1990)	Peak position
UK Singles (OCC)	10

=== Year-end charts ===
Chart (1990)	Position
UK Club Chart (Record Mirror)	89
