= Dave Haslam =

British writer, broadcaster and DJ

Dave Haslam is a British writer, broadcaster and DJ who DJed over 450 times at the Haçienda nightclub in Manchester and has since DJed worldwide. He has written for the New Musical Express, The Guardian, the London Review of Books and The Times, and has published five books.

== Early life, family and education ==
Haslam is originally from Moseley, Birmingham. He was educated at King Edward's School, Birmingham, then moved to Manchester in 1980, and later graduated from the University of Manchester.

== Career ==
After graduating from the University of Manchester, Haslam worked as a concert promoter, hosting live performances by Sonic Youth, Big Black, Primal Scream, the Stone Roses, and others. He began DJing at clubs including the Man Alive and the Venue. In 1983, he founded the fanzine Debris and later also wrote for the New Musical Express. Later in the 1980s, he ran a music label, Play Hard Records, signing bands such as King of the Slums, The Bodines and The Train Set.

From May 1986 he was a DJ at The Haçienda nightclub, including a residency at Thursday's Temperance club night until October 1990. In the 1990s, he hosted the weekly night Yellow at the Boardwalk nightclub in Manchester.

In 1999, he published Manchester, England, a book about the Manchester music scene. Subsequently, he wrote books about superstar DJs, Adventures on the Wheels of Steel; the music and politics of the 1970s, Not Abba; the Real Story of the 1970s (reprinted as Young Hearts Run Free; the Real Story of the 1970s); and Life After Dark; A History of British Nightclubs & Music Venues.

In May 2018, his autobiography Sonic Youth Slept On My Floor: Music, Manchester & More was published. It was described by Victoria Segal in The Sunday Times, as "Smart... beautifully written...utterly endearing". In December 2018 it was acclaimed a 'Book of the Year' by DJ and broadcaster Gilles Peterson.

Other cultural activities of Haslam included creating an installation for the Berlin-based 'Shrinking Cities' exhibition; presenting a twenty-minute talk on the North/South divide for BBC Radio 3; appearing on TV shows on BBC Two (including the series The Seven Ages of Rock, 2007,) and on Channel 4, Granada TV, and Canal Plus (France); and, for two years, hosting a weekly music show on XFM.

In 2009, he created the 'Close Up' series of live onstage interviews. He has since conducted onstage interviews with guests including Jeremy Deller, writers Will Self, Jackie Kay, Michael Chabon, and Jonathan Franzen, musicians Terry Hall, Edwyn Collins, Kevin Rowland, Jarvis Cocker, Nile Rodgers and John Lydon. In January 2014 he hosted his first 'Close Up' interview in Paris, which took place at Silencio and featured Laurent Garnier. He returned to Silencio in October 2014 to interview the disco pioneer Marc Cerrone.

His DJ history includes touring with The Stone Roses, aftershow parties for New Order, Depeche Mode, Gorillaz, and the Charlatans, and gigs in Chicago, Cleveland, Detroit, Berlin, Paris, Reykjavik, Ibiza, Lima, and Geneva. From 2001-2007 he hosted an infrequent guest-only night, 'Sweet Sensation' at various venues in Manchester.

Haslam has taught music journalism at the University of Salford and lectured at Manchester Metropolitan University in the School of Art.

In 2012, he co-curated the exhibition 'Dreams Without Frontiers' at the Manchester Art Gallery. In 2017 he co-curated 'So It Goes' a collaboration between New Order, Liam Gillick, and a 12-piece synthesizer orchestra which was commissioned by Manchester International Festival.

In 2019 he published the first of a series of limited edition "mini-books"; the series is dubbed Art Decades. The subjects of the books includes vinyl record collecting, Keith Haring's relationship with New York nightlife, Courtney Love living in Liverpool in 1982, and the poet Sylvia Plath. The broadcaster James O'Brien has described the Art Decades series as "Lovely editions & beautifully written".
