= Graham Massey =

- Also known as: Massonix
- Born: Graham Vernon Massey; 4 August 1960 (age 66); Manchester, England
- Genres: Electronic; house; rock
- Occupations: Record producer; musician; remixer
- Instruments: Synthesizers; drums; guitar; saxophone
- Years active: 1979–present
- Labels: ZTT; Tommy Boy

Graham Vernon Massey (born 4 August 1960) is a British record producer, musician, and remixer.

== Early career ==
He was a member of experimental punk jazz rock group Biting Tongues, once signed to Factory Records. After recording with the latter he enrolled in a sound engineer course. By 1988, he was a founding member of the British band 808 State. Originally a hip-hop group called Hit Squad Manchester, they shifted to an acid house sound for recording their debut album Newbuild.

== Music ==
808 State was named after Massey's favourite drum machine, the Roland TR-808. He said he thought Roland drum machines were "severely uncool" when they first appeared. Massey had also been a member of the D.I.Y. band Danny and the Dressmakers, a member of the Manchester punk rock band Aqua in the late 1970s (not to be confused with the Danish pop band Aqua from the 1990s), and collaborated with violinist Graham Clark.

Massey co-wrote and co-produced the tracks "Army of Me" and "The Modern Things" for Björk's album Post. Initially recorded in 1992 for her album Debut, they were not released until her second album Post in 1995. "Army of Me" was the first single off Post in May 1995, reaching number 10 in the UK singles chart.

Massey released the solo album Subtracks under the name Massonix on Skam Records. He has side projects with 'Toolshed' and 'Sisters of Transistors', and remixed Brian Dougans's (of The Future Sound of London) track "Stakker Humanoid" for the remix album, "Your Body Sub Atomic". He has also remixed FSOL before on "Papua New Guinea".

In 2004 he worked as a composer for the score of the movie It's All Gone Pete Tong.

2008 saw the realization of a research project as the keyboard quartet Sisters of Transistors with whom he also plays live drums. Massey provided lyrics and music to much of their debut album released in 2009.

Massey is part of the Part-Time Heliocentric Cosmo Drama After-School Club, a Sun Ra tribute band formed in 2013 by Paddy Steer. The group performed at the BBC 6 Music Festival in March 2014.
