= 808 State =

English electronic music group

- 808 State in 1991

Background information
- Origin: Manchester, England
- Genres: Electronic; acid house; techno; Madchester
- Years active: 1987–present
- Labels: ZTT; Tommy Boy; Warner Bros.; Rephlex; Circus; Shadow
- Members: Graham Massey
- Past members: Andy Barker; Gerald Simpson; Martin Price; Darren Partington
- Website: www.808state.com

808 State are an English electronic music group formed in 1987 in Manchester by Graham Massey, Martin Price and Gerald Simpson. Taking their name from the Roland TR-808 drum machine and the "state of mind" the members shared, they released their debut album Newbuild in September 1988. They secured commercial success in 1989, when their song "Pacific State" was picked up by BBC Radio 1 DJ Gary Davies and charted for 11 weeks in the UK.

The group's early work influenced the UK's burgeoning acid house scene. AllMusic called them "one of the most important dance music acts of all time," and noted their influence on subsequent techno, IDM, and alternative dance artists.

== History ==
Martin Price owned Manchester's influential Eastern Bloc Records and was also the founder of the independent record label, Creed. Customers Graham Massey and Gerald Simpson joined with Price to form a hip-hop group called Hit Squad Manchester. The group shifted to an acid house sound and recorded their debut Newbuild in 1988, under the name 808 State.

Newbuild was released on Price's own record label. In an interview with Mojo magazine in 2005, Graham Massey explained that the album was recorded over a weekend in January 1988 at Spirit Studios, Manchester. Named after a Bolton housing co-operative, the record was re-released in 2005 on Aphex Twin's Rephlex Records. Aphex Twin was a huge fan of the record: "It was the next step after Chicago acid, and as much as I loved that, I could relate much better to 808 State. It seemed colder and more human at the same time."

Around the same time, the band also recorded an acid house version of New Order's "Blue Monday". A favourite at The Haçienda's 'Hot' night, the recording was believed lost until Autechre's Sean Booth asked Massey to dig through his archive of old material. The record was released in 2004 by Rephlex Records. "We didn't put a lot of thought into it but maybe that's its charm," said Massey at the time.

The band's song "Pacific State" became the band's breakthrough single, peaking at number 10 on the UK Singles Chart. Simpson left the group in 1989 to form his own solo project, A Guy Called Gerald.

As "Pacific State" climbed the charts in late 1989, Simpson entered a legal dispute with 808 State over its writing credits. He alleged that he was not being given due credit for his contribution to the track, which he said included supplying its main bass and drum samples, and that although he had been credited on the song's first appearance on the band's Creed-label debut album, later versions and remixes had appeared without acknowledging him. The band responded that no problem had arisen until Simpson's new publisher, Zomba Music, became involved. Graham Massey stated that the track had been recorded more than a year earlier, that Simpson had long been aware of it, and that Simpson's publisher had first claimed he was owed the entire song before revising the demand to 75 per cent the following week. The dispute was complicated by 808 State's contention that variously titled remixes—"Pacific 202", "303" and "909"—were distinct songs containing none of Simpson's samples, while Simpson maintained they were essentially the same track and that he was therefore owed a writing credit.

Rapper MC Tunes worked with the band on the 1990 album The North at Its Heights. The album was a moderate success, reaching number 26 on the UK Albums Chart, and also saw a European and Japanese release. It spawned three UK singles, "The Only Rhyme That Bites" – featuring a sample of "The Big Country" performed by the City of Prague Philharmonic (UK number 10), "Tunes Splits the Atom" (UK number 18) and "Primary Rhyming" (UK number 67). The first two issues credited MC Tunes versus 808 State, whilst the latter was simply MC Tunes. Tunes later returned in 1996 to work on a new track, "Pump", taken from 808 State's album Thermo Kings.

808 State's next album, 1991's ex:el, featured the vocals of Bernard Sumner and Björk and the singles "In Yer Face" (UK number 9), "Cübik" (UK number 10) and "Lift" (UK number 38).

In October 1991, Price left the group to perform solo production work, eventually forming his own label, Sun Text. The remaining members released a fourth album called Gorgeous, and after that, did some remix work for David Bowie, Soundgarden, and other performers, before returning with the album entitled Don Solaris in 1996. It featured vocal contributions from James Dean Bradfield on "Lopez", which reached number 20 on the UK Singles Chart and was remixed by Brian Eno. In 1997, they had remixed the Mansun track "Skin Up Pin Up" for the Spawn soundtrack. The song "Bond" featured vocals by Mike Doughty from the band Soul Coughing and "Azura" featured Lou Rhodes from Lamb. They released a greatest hits compilation album, 808:88:98 in 1998. In 2000, Newbuild was re-released.

Some of the band's work, particularly in the albums ex:el and Gorgeous show their new wave influences by sampling or featuring new wave icons such as Bernard Sumner on the song "Spanish Heart" and Ian McCulloch on "Moses". The song "Contrique" samples the bassline to Joy Division's "She's Lost Control" and "10 X 10" is a gospel-house track built on the foundation of the Jam's "Start!".

In 2003, they released Outpost Transmission which featured guest collaborations from Alabama 3 and Guy Garvey from Elbow.

In May 2008, the re-issue of the mini-album Quadrastate completed a trilogy of pre-ZTT releases on CD for the first time.

Partington left the band after being jailed for 18 months in January 2015 for dealing heroin and crack cocaine.

Barker died on 6 November 2021, leaving Massey as the sole remaining member of the group.

== Musical style ==
808 State's style has been labeled as techno and house, and the band are regarded as "a pioneer of the acid house sound". The band's album, Newbuild, was influential in the development of the Madchester and baggy scenes.

== Pseudonyms and side projects ==
In 1990, 808 State composed the theme tune to the Channel 4 television programme, The Word.

Partington and Barker presented the 808 State Radio Show, first on Sunset 102 from 1989 to 1993, and later on Kiss 102 from 1994 to 1997. In 2012, they reinvented the program as the 808 State Webio Show for a number of months on Mike Joyce's internet based BeatWolf Radio.

808 State and its various members have recorded under a variety of pseudonyms. An early EP, containing the tracks "Massage-a-Rama" and "Sex Mechanic", was released under the name Lounge Jays. These tracks have since been re-released by Rephlex Records on the Prebuild LP. Another early EP, Wax on the Melt, was released under the name Hit Squad Mcr. This is the only release on which all five members of the group (Massey, Price, Simpson, Barker, and Partington) contributed simultaneously.

Massey released the solo album Subtracks under the name Massonix on Skam Records. He was a member of Biting Tongues, an experimental jazz rock group once signed to Factory Records. He also created the big band project called Massey's Toolshed Allstars (eventually shortened to 'Toolshed'). Under the pseudonym Professor Vernon World, Massey as drummer/producer with the ladies combo organ quartet the Sisters of Transistors released an album, and is also a member of Sun Ra homage the Part-Time Heliocentric Cosmo Drama After School Club.

Price released a couple of EPs under the name Switzerland. He also managed the band Kaliphz (later known as Kaleef) who had a hit with a hip-hop cover version of the Stranglers' "Golden Brown". Barker has produced a small number of tracks under the names Atlas and Benaco. Partington has also recorded under the name Jeep.

== Band members ==
- Graham Massey (born 4 August 1960, Manchester) – keyboards, programming, guitars, saxophone (1987–present)

=== Former members ===
- Gerald Simpson (born 16 February 1967, Manchester) – keyboards (1987–1989)
- Martin Price (born 26 March 1955, Farnworth) – keyboards (1987–1991)
- Darren Partington (born 1 November 1969, Manchester) – keyboards, congas, electronic drums (1989–2015)
- Andy Barker (9 March 1968, Manchester – 6 November 2021) – keyboards, bass (1989–2021)

== Discography ==
Studio albums

- Newbuild (1988)
- Quadrastate (mini-album) (1989)
- 90 (1989)
- ex:el (1991)
- Gorgeous (1993)
- Don Solaris (1996)
- Outpost Transmission (2002)
- Transmission Suite (2019)
