= Live at Jodrell Bank =

Live album by Elbow
- Released: 25 November 2013
- Recorded: 23 June 2012
- Venue: Jodrell Bank Observatory, Manchester
- Genre: Alternative rock; art rock; post-Britpop; indie rock; electronic rock
- Length: 103:29
- Label: Fiction Records
- Producer: Lesley Douglas

Elbow chronology
Dead in the Boot (2012)	Live at Jodrell Bank (2013)

Live at Jodrell Bank is a live album and DVD released by Elbow on 25 November 2013 through Fiction Records.

== Track listing ==
All tracks are written by Elbow

CD 1
No.	Title	Length
1.	"High Ideals"	7:36
2.	"The Bones of You"	5:08
3.	"Station Approach"	5:49
4.	"Lippy Kids"	7:01
5.	"Leaders of the Free World"	8:08
6.	"Grounds for Divorce"	5:02
7.	"The Loneliness of a Tower Crane Driver"	6:43
8.	"The Night Will Always Win"	4:52

CD 2
No.	Title	Length
1.	"Starlings"	7:02
2.	"Mirrorball"	6:07
3.	"Weather to Fly"	8:03
4.	"Open Arms"	6:18
5.	"Scattered Black and Whites"	7:40
6.	"The Birds"	9:32
7.	"One Day Like This"	8:35

DVD
No.	Title	Length
1.	"Concert Film"	103:29
2.	"Documentary"	59:16
3.	"Bonus"	3:00
