= Flying Dream 1 =

Studio album by Elbow
- Released: 19 November 2021
- Venues: Theatre Royal, Brighton, England
- Length: 44:32
- Label: Polydor
- Producer: Craig Potter

Elbow chronology
Giants of All Sizes (2019)	Flying Dream 1 (2021)	Audio Vertigo (2024)

Flying Dream 1 is the ninth studio album by British alternative rock band Elbow. It was released on 19 November 2021, through Polydor Records.

== Composition and recording ==
Flying Dream 1 was written remotely during the COVID-19 pandemic, with each band member composing music at their homes in Manchester and London and exchanging their ideas online with the other members. The songs were then completed and recorded at the Theatre Royal in Brighton while it was still closed and empty, as a result of the pandemic. Singer Guy Garvey stated that the writing of Flying Dream 1 had been influenced by "patient, quiet, whole albums" by artists such as Chet Baker, Van Morrison, John Martyn, Kate Bush, PJ Harvey, Talk Talk and the Blue Nile.

== Critical reception ==
Professional ratings
Aggregate scores
Source	Rating
AnyDecentMusic?	7.8/10
Metacritic	83/100
Review scores
Source	Rating
The Arts Desk	4/5 stars
Gigwise	8/10 stars
The Irish Times	3/5 stars
Mojo	4/5 stars
musicOMH	4/5 stars
NME	3/5 stars
The Observer	4/5 stars
Paste	8.2/10
Uncut	9/10

Flying Dream 1 received positive reviews from critics, with many noting that the album's focus on quieter songs, compared with previous albums. Steven Edelstone of Paste said, "It sounds like the band held a competition during quarantine last year to write the prettiest songs they possibly could, ranked the 10 most beautiful ones they came up with and packaged them into a single record ... And the results are stunning." Johnny Sharp of Uncut stated that there was "a gorgeously somnambulant yet softly romantic feel to these 10 songs" and that they benefitted from the "masterfully subtle arrangement touches". In Mojo, Victoria Segal said that the band had gone "back into a gentler bubble" following the bleakness of previous album Giants of All Sizes, and that "Garvey's lyricism is elevated by the subtle complexity of the music, clarinets, choral voices and churchy keyboards whispering through the vents of these songs, causing a quiet stir". Phil Mongredien of The Observer stated that "With the exception of impassioned closer 'What Am I Without You', there is nothing on Flying Dream 1 that leaps out at the listener; instead these songs represent subtle gradations of softly articulated warmth and empathy." He compared parts of the album to Talk Talk's Laughing Stock, and concluded, "this is an album that (once again) quietly demands to be heard, and enjoyed, as an inseparable whole".

Writing for NME, Damian Jones called Flying Dream 1 "by far the most downbeat, mellow collection the Bury band have put to record" and noted the repeated references to memories of friends and family, and previous Elbow records. He ended his review saying, "Flying Dream 1 may be devoid of gnarly anthems like 'Grounds For Divorce' or grandiose moments like 'One Day Like This', but the record's unhurried approach and unassuming manner will still bring comfort to those who seek solace in Garvey's lyrics and Elbow's adept consistency." Andrea Cleary of The Irish Times called the album "a soft-spoken collection of vivid vignettes, driven by warm piano and Garvey's well-honed sincerity", and observed that "Absent from the album are the bombastic anthems Elbow are probably best known for. This is a welcome breather, which allows the band's musicianship to shine." She felt, however, that the band "relies too much on these previously established modes. There is more mood than melody here, but while the band never manages to match their divine influences, there are moments when this newfound restraint pays off."

== Track listing ==
All songs music by Elbow, lyrics by Guy Garvey.

1. "Flying Dream 1" – 4:34
2. "After the Eclipse" – 4:18
3. "Is It a Bird" – 4:12
4. "Six Words" – 5:06
5. "Calm and Happy" – 3:06
6. "Come On, Blue" – 5:19
7. "The Only Road" – 4:23
8. "Red Sky Radio (Baby Baby Baby)" – 4:08
9. "The Seldom Seen Kid" – 4:18
10. "What Am I Without You" – 5:08
- Note: "Red Sky Radio (Baby Baby Baby)" contains elements of "Looking Back, I Should Have Been Home More", written by Richard Swift

== Personnel ==
Elbow

- Guy Garvey – vocals
- Craig Potter – keyboards
- Mark Potter – guitars
- Pete Turner – bass

Additional personnel

- Sarah Field – clarinet, saxophone
- Jesca Hoop – backing vocals
- Alex Reeves – drums, percussion
- Wilson Atie, Adeleye Omotayo and Marit Røkeberg – backing vocals

== Charts ==
Chart performance for Flying Dream 1
Chart (2021)	Peak position
Belgian Albums (Ultratop Flanders)	26
Belgian Albums (Ultratop Wallonia)	125
Dutch Albums (Album Top 100)	16
German Albums (Offizielle Top 100)	50
Irish Albums (Official Charts)	39
Scottish Albums (Official Charts)	8
Swiss Albums (Schweizer Hitparade)	41
UK Albums (Official Charts)	7
