= Giants of All Sizes =

Studio album by Elbow
- Released: 11 October 2019
- Studios: Clouds Hill, Hamburg; The Dairy, Brixton; 604 Studios, Vancouver; Blueprint Studios, Salford; Band members' home studios
- Length: 40:05 (physical); 39:45 (streaming)
- Label: Polydor
- Producer: Craig Potter

Elbow chronology
Little Fictions (2017)	Giants of All Sizes (2019)	Flying Dream 1 (2021)

Singles from Giants of All Sizes
- 1. "Dexter & Sinister" Released: 1 August 2019; 2. "Empires" Released: 21 August 2019; 3. "White Noise White Heat" Released: 3 October 2019

Giants of All Sizes is the eighth studio album by British alternative rock band Elbow, released on Polydor Records on 11 October 2019. The album has a darker lyrical tone than previous Elbow albums, with singer Guy Garvey's lyrics relating to Brexit, the Grenfell Tower fire tragedy and the deaths of his father and two close friends. It was widely praised by critics, and entered the UK Albums Chart at number one, becoming the band's third consecutive chart-topping studio album.

== Writing and composition ==
During the writing and recording of Giants of All Sizes three people close to the band died: Guy Garvey's father Don died of lung cancer in March 2018; further, in October 2018 two close friends of the group who lived and worked in Manchester, Scott Alexander (owner of live venues Big Hands and the Temple) and Jan Oldenburg (owner of the Night and Day Café, where Elbow gained their first record deal), both died unexpectedly within eight days of each other. The album's liner notes carry a dedication to all three men. Garvey stated that these deaths greatly affected the band and influenced the "darker place" that the album comes from. "Dexter & Sinister" is a reference to the left and right sides of a heraldic design – Manchester's coat of arms includes a shield with an antelope and a lion as supporters on either side, and Garvey said that he now pictured the shield without the two animals, representing the fact that Alexander and Oldenburg were no longer around.

Other songs on the album also touch on the subject of death. "The Delayed 3:15" tells the story of a man who committed suicide by throwing himself under a train that Garvey was travelling on between Manchester and London, causing the train to be held up while the body was retrieved. Garvey had been trying to write lyrics during the journey for the song's music, which had been composed by guitarist Mark Potter. He noted that the spot where the suicide occurred was one of the less picturesque places along the train route, and that the man had therefore seen no beauty in the act he committed. "Empires" acknowledges that someone somewhere in the world is always affected by deaths, natural disasters or job losses, and also describes Garvey's belief that Brexit will trigger the eventual break-up of the European Union.

Another recurring theme on the album is the divisions in societies. "Dexter & Sinister"'s title alludes to the sharp division in the UK between the voters of the Leave and Remain sides in the Brexit debate. "White Noise White Heat" expresses Garvey's anger at the neglect by the authorities that led to the Grenfell Tower fire and the lack of justice for the affected families in its aftermath, stating that it was "because they were poor". "Doldrums" describes an event in Vancouver, where Garvey was accompanying his wife Rachael Stirling while she was filming The Bletchley Circle, when he saw a well-dressed woman walk down the street past homeless men, who stepped aside to let her through, and she never acknowledged them.

Garvey also stated that despite the album's subdued tone, the record tries to find comfort in personal relationships. "My Trouble" and "On Deronda Road" are tributes to his wife and son, respectively, with the latter describing the happy memory of a bus journey Garvey made with his young son in south London, passing the Deronda Road bus stop. On closing track "Weightless" Garvey notes the similarities and connections between himself, his newborn son and his dying father, and said, "Jack's arrival really helped me through Dad's death, because it made Dad's death part of things, rather than the end of things. And it made my own life part of things, rather than the point of things."

== Artwork ==
The album cover artwork is a stock photograph from Visual China Group (VCG) licensed to Getty Images, showing a crowded Chinese swimming pool in summer. Garvey explained to Music Week that the band had wanted to use an image that showed as many people as possible, to depict a wide range of human emotions and interactions, and which could be opened out to display a larger photograph on gatefold versions of the album.

== Release and promotion ==
The band shared the album's first single, "Dexter & Sinister", online on 1 August 2019. The song was made available to purchase as a download and as a single-sided 10" vinyl record on 2 August 2019. On 7 August 2019 it was announced that Giants of All Sizes would be released on 11 October 2019. A second single, "Empires", was made available to stream and download on 21 August 2019. "White Noise White Heat" was shared online as the album's third single on 3 October 2019.

On 7 October 2019, it was announced that, to celebrate National Album Day on 12 October, a special "don't skip" CD version Giants of All Sizes featuring the entire album as one single track would be available for that day only. A UK tour in March and April 2020 in support of the album was announced on 20 September 2019.

== Critical reception ==
Professional ratings
Aggregate scores
Source	Rating
AnyDecentMusic?	7.9/10
Metacritic	84/100
Review scores
Source	Rating
AllMusic	4/5 stars
The Daily Telegraph	4/5 stars
The Guardian	4/5 stars
The Independent	4/5 stars
Mojo	4/5 stars
Paste	8.0/10
Q	4/5 stars
The Times	2/5 stars
Uncut	4/5 stars

Roisin O'Connor of The Independent called it "perhaps their greatest album since their Mercury Prize-winning breakthrough The Seldom Seen Kid" and "more explicit statements on social and political affairs than we're used to from Elbow". The Guardian's Alexis Petridis called it "a succession of troubling songs", noting the references to Grenfell Tower fire and deaths of Garvey's father and two close friends, and that Giants of All Sizes "digs into prog's more disruptive side, the wilful awkwardness expressed by its jarring time signatures, unpredictable shifts and knotty cramp-inducing riffs", but concluded that the album "is richer and stranger than anything they've released since their commercial breakthrough" and that the style suited them. In Q Dorian Lynskey said that for much of the album "Elbow use ominous rhythms and keyboard drones to paint with a different palette: bruise-violet and midnight blue". He stated that Garvey's vocals were also changed, "willing to sit with his fears than chase them away with optimism and charm". Steven Edelstone of Paste noted that "Garvey's lyrical frustration with the outside world is accompanied by louder and heavier instrumentals than anything we've heard since The Seldom Seen Kid's 'Grounds for Divorce'" but that although the music and lyrics expressed anger at "post-Brexit malaise" and death, the band find hope for the future in family and friends. Writing for Mojo, Victoria Segal said that "grand images ... are used to describe bereavement, decline, a nation in a state" and that "Elbow reflect an unruly world here, but if they sometimes lose faith, they never lose heart." A negative review came from Will Hodgkinson of The Times, who felt that "Elbow's trademark hypnotic tastefulness has merely been welded on to a bit of heavy subject matter and the result is naggingly unsatisfying."

== Track listing ==
All music written by Elbow, all lyrics written by Guy Garvey.

1. "Dexter & Sinister" – 7:00 on physical and download versions, 6:40 on streaming version
2. "Seven Veils" – 4:36
3. "Empires" – 4:00
4. "The Delayed 3:15" – 3:25
5. "White Noise White Heat" – 3:56
6. "Doldrums" – 3:02
7. "My Trouble" – 5:18
8. "On Deronda Road" – 4:02
9. "Weightless" – 4:45

== Personnel ==
Credits adapted from the album's liner notes.

Elbow

- Guy Garvey – vocals, string arrangement on "The Delayed 3:15"
- Craig Potter – keyboards
- Mark Potter – guitars
- Pete Turner – bass guitar

Additional personnel

- Violeta Barreña – violin on "The Delayed 3:15"
- Chilli Chilton – backing vocals on "Doldrums"
- Marius de Vries – string arrangement on "My Trouble"
- Sarah Field – trumpet, tenor saxophone and soprano saxophone on "Dexter & Sinister"
- Jesca Hoop – additional vocals on "Dexter & Sinister"
- The Plumedores (Dean Casement, Andy Hargreaves, Danny McTague, Mark Potter, Mat Skinner) – vocals on "On Deronda Road"
- Alex Reeves – drums on all tracks except "My Trouble" and "On Deronda Road", percussion on "Seven Veils", "Empires" and "White Noise White Heat"
- Matt Robertson – string arrangement on "My Trouble"
- Nathan "Nathan Sudders" Sudders – vocals on "On Deronda Road"
- The Hallé Orchestra – strings on "White Noise White Heat" and "My Trouble"
  - Conductor: Jonathan Heyward
  - First violin: Sarah Ewins (leader), Nicola Clarke, Zoe Coleman, Peter Liang, Michelle Marsh, Steven Proctor
  - Second violin: Rosemary Attree, Paulette Bayley, Elizabeth Bosworth, Helena Buckie, Philippa Heys, John Purton
  - Viola: Cameron Campbell, Chris Emerson, Julian Mottram, Timothy Pooley
  - Cello: Dale Culliford, Jane Hallett, David Petri, Clare Rowe, Nick Trygstad, Simon Turner
  - Double bass: Daniel Storer, Yi Xin Salvage

Production

- Craig Potter – production, mixing
- Danny Evans – engineer
- Tom Baird – additional engineer on "Dexter & Sinister", "Empires", "White Noise White Heat", "On Deronda Road" and "Weightless"
- Pedro Dzelme – assistant engineer on "Doldrums"
- Charlie Leake – additional engineer on "Dexter & Sinister", "Empires", "White Noise White Heat", "On Deronda Road" and "Weightless"
- Sebastian Muxfeldt – additional engineer on "Dexter & Sinister", "Empires" and "Weightless"
- Gary Hadfield – assistant engineer on "Dexter & Sinister", "The Delayed 3:15", "White Noise White Heat" and "My Trouble"
- Katie May – assistant engineer on "Empires", "White Noise White Heat" and "Weightless"
- Ollie Middleton – assistant engineer on "Empires", "White Noise White Heat" and "Weightless"
- Ian Stewart – assistant engineer on "Dexter & Sinister", "Seven Veils", "The Delayed 3:15" and "White Noise White Heat"
- VGC – cover photography
- Elbow – art direction

== Charts ==
Chart (2019)	Peak position
Australian Albums (ARIA)	60
Austrian Albums (Ö3 Austria)	58
Belgian Albums (Ultratop Flanders)	5
Belgian Albums (Ultratop Wallonia)	38
Dutch Albums (Album Top 100)	10
German Albums (Offizielle Top 100)	32
Irish Albums (IRMA)	6
Scottish Albums (Official Charts)	1
Swiss Albums (Schweizer Hitparade)	27
UK Albums (Official Charts)	1
