= Little Fictions =

2017 studio album by English rock band Elbow

Studio album by Elbow
- Released: 3 February 2017
- Recorded: 2015–2016
- Studio: Blueprint Studios (Salford); Gargunnock House (Stirling); Elbow Rooms (Manchester)
- Genre: Art rock, indie rock
- Length: 48:32
- Label: Polydor; Concord
- Producer: Craig Potter

Elbow chronology
The Take Off and Landing of Everything (2014)	Little Fictions (2017)	Giants of All Sizes (2019)

Singles from Little Fictions
- 1. "Magnificent (She Says)" Released: 15 December 2016; 2. "All Disco" Released: 5 January 2017; 3. "Gentle Storm" Released: 27 January 2017

Little Fictions is the seventh studio album by English rock band Elbow, released on 3 February 2017 on Polydor Records and Concord Records. Produced by pianist and keyboardist Craig Potter, the album is the band's first without founding drummer Richard Jupp, who had departed from the band the previous year.

The album was preceded by the singles "Magnificent (She Says)", "All Disco" and "Gentle Storm", and features collaborations with The Hallé Orchestra and their choir.

== Singles ==
The lead single from the album, "Magnificent (She Says)", was released on 6 December 2016. The second single, "All Disco", was released on 5 January 2017, and was inspired by American musician Black Francis of the band Pixies. The third single, "Gentle Storm", was released on 27 January 2017. The music video for the song, directed by Kevin Godley, was released alongside the single. The video was inspired by the song "Cry" by Godley & Creme, and featured English actor Benedict Cumberbatch alongside the band members and some family and friends.

== Reception ==
Professional ratings
Aggregate scores
Source	Rating
Metacritic	80/100
Review scores
Source	Rating
AllMusic	3.5/5 stars
The Guardian	4/5 stars
Slant Magazine	4/5 stars
MusicOMH	4/5 stars
Under the Radar	8/10

Little Fictions was well-received from music critics upon its release. At Metacritic, which assigns a normalized rating out of 100 to reviews from mainstream critics, the album has received an average score of 80 based on 19 reviews, indicating "generally favourable reviews". Many reviews credited the changes the band made on the album, mainly pointing towards the more 'soulful' sound they had achieved.

In the review for AllMusic, editor Stephen Thomas Erlewine wrote that "By moving forward steadily, encompassing a changing present -- both in musical and personal terms -- Elbow wind up with a mature, resonant record. Little Fictions feels quietly hopeful, making it a tonic for troubled times." In the review for The Guardian, Dave Simpson described the album as having "Songs are built around loops or percussive pianos; electric guitar motifs replace strummed acoustics and Garvey is audibly a man in love, although the results are more uplifting than gooey." In the write-up for Slant Magazine, Josh Hurst declared that "Little Fictions, then, might be called the quietest of Elbow albums, as it’s the tamest and most ballad-heavy. It might just as easily be christened their most intimate, their most casual, and their most soulful. All of these superlatives are relative, of course; the album grows in stature and appeal with every spin, and distinguishes itself as an Elbow album not quite like any other."

Amongst the other positively-received reviews of the album, Alan Ashton-Smith from MusicOMH stated that "It might just as easily be christened their most intimate, their most casual, and their most soulful. All of these superlatives are relative, of course; the album grows in stature and appeal with every spin, and distinguishes itself as an Elbow album not quite like any other." With similar levels of praise, Under the Radar magazine's Scott Dransfield called the album "epic" and that it "seem[ed] designed to mimic techno and other electronic forms via organic instruments," while concluding overall that "compositionally Elbow sounds more refreshed than they have since The Seldom Seen Kid, and hopefully Little Fictions is a signal of the beginning of a new creative phase." Concluding their review for Pretty Much Amazing, Landon MacDonald declared that "Little Fictions is another solid entry in the Elbow catalog that is destined to be mostly ignored. The band peaked almost a decade ago, but still churns out surprisingly deep, solid records every couple of years. If you are still reading this, you probably are a fan and maybe even wish they were more on top of the world like Coldplay or something, know that I agree and its really all disco anyway."

== Track listing ==
No.	Title	Length
1.	"Magnificent (She Says)"	4:26
2.	"Gentle Storm"	3:40
3.	"Trust the Sun"	5:55
4.	"All Disco"	4:28
5.	"Head for Supplies"	3:56
6.	"Firebrand & Angel"	5:25
7.	"K2"	5:20
8.	"Montparnasse"	2:40
9.	"Little Fictions"	8:26
10.	"Kindling"	4:16
Total length:		48:32

== Accolades ==
Publication	Accolade	Rank	Ref.
Abc News	Top 50 Albums of 2017	17	
Albumism	Top 50 Albums of 2017	16	
KCRW	Top 10 Albums of 2017	10	

== Credits ==
=== Elbow ===
- Guy Garvey – lead vocals, guitar
- Craig Potter – keyboard, piano, backing vocals, producer
- Mark Potter – guitar, backing vocals
- Pete Turner – bass guitar, backing vocals

=== Additional musicians ===
- Alex Reeves – drums percussion
- The Halle Orchestra, the Halle Ancoats Community Choir, members of London Contemporary Voices

== Charts ==
=== Weekly charts ===
Chart (2017)	Peak position
Australian Albums (ARIA)	16
Austrian Albums (Ö3 Austria)	31
Belgian Albums (Ultratop Flanders)	3
Belgian Albums (Ultratop Wallonia)	28
Dutch Albums (Album Top 100)	1
French Albums (SNEP)	185
German Albums (Offizielle Top 100)	19
Irish Albums (IRMA)	1
New Zealand Heatseeker Albums (RMNZ)	1
Scottish Albums (OCC)	1
Swiss Albums (Schweizer Hitparade)	23
UK Albums (OCC)	1
US Billboard 200	172

=== Year-end charts ===
Chart (2017)	Position
Belgian Albums (Ultratop Flanders)	60
UK Albums (OCC)	61
