= First Steps (song) =

Single by Elbow
- Released: 27 July 2012
- Length: 6:21
- Label: Polydor
- Songwriters: Guy Garvey, Elbow

Elbow singles chronology
"Lippy Kids" (2011)	"First Steps" (2012)

"First Steps" is a song composed and recorded by Elbow as the BBC's theme for the 2012 Summer Olympics.

== Production history ==
The BBC invited Elbow to present ideas for the 2012 Olympic theme, on the strength of their 2008 song "One Day Like This", which had been used during the Beijing Olympics and televising of subsequent sporting events.

In November 2011 it was announced that the BBC had commissioned Elbow to composing the theme music. The six-minute anthem was recorded with the BBC Philharmonic Orchestra and the NovaVox gospel choir.

The anthemic composition and the accompanying visuals were intended to sum up the achievement of reaching the Olympics, the emotions of those who win and those who do not, and the coming together of the whole country to support the event. The title was inspired by a child of one of the band members learning to walk during the composition of the song, symbolising the hope and achievement of the moment.

The title sequence used for television coverage of the Games pairs the song with an animation depicting the United Kingdom as one vast stadium.

Although the full version lasts more than six minutes, it was intentionally composed to allow different clips of one or two minutes to be played during montages of winners or losers.

== Availability ==
"First Steps" was available only as a digital download from selected retailers, who waived their profits. Elbow also waived any fees from sales. At least 20p from each download was shared equally between the charities BBC Children in Need and Sport Relief. The song is no longer available for download from any of the retailers.

== Track listing ==
No.	Title	Length
1.	"First Steps"	6:21
2.	"First Steps" (edit)	4:01
