= Ivor Novello Award for Best Song Musically and Lyrically =

Award for songwriting

- Awarded for: quality songwriting from Britain and Ireland
- Country: United Kingdom
- Presented by: The Ivors Academy
- First award: 1968
- Currently held by: Victoria Canal, Jonny Lattimer and Eg White for "Black Swan" (2024)
- Website: ivorsacademy.com/awards

The Ivor Novello Award for Best Song Musically and Lyrically is one of the awards presented annually by the Ivors Academy at the Ivor Novello Awards to recognize the best in songwriting and composing talents from the United Kingdom and Ireland. The award was first presented in 1968, with John Lennon and Paul McCartney being the first recipients for the song "She's Leaving Home", performed by The Beatles. The award goes to the writers of the song, not the performers unless they share songwriting credits.

== Recipients ==
=== 1960s ===
List of award nominees and winners for the 1960s
Year	Songwriter(s)	Song	Performing artist(s)	Result	Ref.
1968	John Lennon, Paul McCartney	"She's Leaving Home"	The Beatles	Won	
1968	Tony Hatch, Jackie Trent	"Don't Sleep in the Subway"	Petula Clark	Nominated	
1969	Category inactive				

=== 1970s ===
List of award nominees and winners for the 1970s
Year	Songwriter(s)	Song	Performing artist(s)	Result	Ref.
1970	Peter Sarstedt	"Where Do You Go To (My Lovely)?"	Peter Sarstedt	Won	
1971	George Harrison	"Something"	The Beatles	Won	
1972	Hurricane Smith	"Don't Let It Die"	Hurricane Smith	Won	
1973	Tom Evans and Peter Ham	'"Without You"	Badfinger	Won	
1974	Elton John and Bernie Taupin	'"Daniel"	Elton John	Won	
1975	Ralph McTell	"Streets of London"	Ralph McTell	Won	
1976	Category inactive				
1977	Category inactive				
1978	Tim Rice and Andrew Lloyd Webber	"Don't Cry for Me Argentina"	Julie Covington	Won	
1978	Barry Gibb, Robin Gibb, Maurice Gibb	"How Deep Is Your Love"	Bee Gees	Nominated	
1978	John Farrar, Hank Marvin, Don Black	"Sam"	Olivia Newton-John	Nominated	
1979	Gerry Rafferty	"Baker Street"	Gerry Rafferty	Won	
1979	Chris Arnold, David Martin, Geoff Morrow	"Can't Smile Without You"	The Carpenters	Nominated	
1979	Kate Bush	"Wuthering Heights"	Kate Bush	Nominated	

=== 1980s ===
List of award nominees and winners for the 1980s
Year	Songwriter(s)	Song	Performing artist(s)	Result	Ref.
1980	Rick Davies and Roger Hodgson	"The Logical Song"	Supertramp	Won	
1980	Mike Batt	"Bright Eyes"	Art Garfunkel	Nominated	
1980	Alan Tarney	"We Don't Talk Anymore"	Cliff Richard	Nominated	
1981	Barry Gibb and Robin Gibb	"Woman in Love"	Barbra Streisand	Won	
1981	Kate Bush	"Babooshka"	Kate Bush	Nominated	
1981	Ken Leray	"Together We Are Beautiful"	Fern Kinney	Nominated	
1981	Tony Macaulay, Don Black	"Your Ears Should Be Burning Now"	Marti Webb	Nominated	
1982	Andrew Lloyd Webber, T.S. Eliot, Trevor Nunn	"Memory"	Elaine Paige	Won	
1982	Andy Hill, Pete Sinfield	"The Land of Make Believe"	Bucks Fizz	Nominated	
1982	John Lennon	"Woman"	John Lennon	Nominated	
1983	Andy Hill, Pete Sinfield, John Danter	"Have You Ever Been in Love"	Leo Sayer	Won	
1983	Barry Gibb, Robin Gibb, Maurice Gibb	"Heartbreaker"	Dionne Warwick	Nominated	
1983	Andy Hill, Nichola Martin	"Now Those Days Are Gone"	Bucks Fizz	Nominated	
1984	Sting	"Every Breath You Take"	The Police	Won	
1984	Paul McCartney	"Pipes of Peace"	Paul McCartney	Nominated	
1984	Gary Kemp	"True"	Spandau Ballet	Nominated	
1985	Phil Collins	"Against All Odds (Take a Look at Me Now)"	Phil Collins	Won	
1985	George Michael, Andrew Ridgeley	"Careless Whisper"	George Michael	Nominated	
1985	Jim Diamond, Graham Lyle	"I Should Have Known Better"	Jim Diamond	Nominated	
1986	Elton John, Bernie Taupin	"Nikita"	Elton John	Won	
1986	Roland Orzabal, Ian Stanley, Chris Hughes	"Everybody Wants to Rule the World"	Tears for Fears	Nominated	
1986	Tim Rice, Björn Ulvaeus, Benny Andersson	"I Know Him So Well"	Elaine Paige and Barbara Dickson	Nominated	
1986	Mick Jones	"I Want to Know What Love Is"	Foreigner	Nominated	
1987	Peter Gabriel	"Don't Give Up"	Peter Gabriel and Kate Bush	Won	
1987	Charles Hart, Andrew Lloyd Webber, Richard Stilgoe	"All I Ask of You"	Cliff Richard and Sarah Brightman	Nominated	
1987	Annie Lennox, Dave Stewart	"The Miracle of Love"	Eurythmics	Nominated	
1988	Labi Siffre	"(Something Inside) So Strong"	Labi Siffre	Won	
1988	Simon Climie, Dennis Morgan	"I Knew You Were Waiting (For Me)"	Aretha Franklin and George Michael	Nominated	
1988	Tony Banks, Phil Collins, Michael Rutherford	"Throwing It All Away"	Genesis	Nominated	
1989	Sting	"They Dance Alone"	Sting	Won	
1989	Gary Clark	"Mary's Prayer"	Danny Wilson	Nominated	
1989	Mark Nevin	"Perfect"	Fairground Attraction	Nominated	

=== 1990s ===
List of award nominees and winners for the 1990s
Year	Songwriter(s)	Song	Performing artist(s)	Result	Ref.
1990	B.A. Robertson and Mike Rutherford	"The Living Years"	Mike + The Mechanics	Won	
1990	Phil Collins	"Another Day in Paradise"	Phil Collins	Nominated	
1990	Marcus Vere, Richard Darbyshire, Albert Hammond	"Room in Your Heart"	Living in a Box	Nominated	
1991	Elton John, Bernie Taupin	"Sacrifice"	Elton John	Won	
1991	Justin Currie	"Nothing Ever Happens"	Del Amitri	Nominated	
1991	Paddy McAloon	"We Let the Stars Go"	Prefab Sprout	Nominated	
1992	Mike Scott	"The Whole of the Moon"	The Waterboys	Won	
1992	Mick Hucknall	"Stars"	Simply Red	Nominated	
1992	Freddie Mercury, Brian May, Roger Taylor, John Deacon	"The Show Must Go On"	Queen	Nominated	
1993	Annie Lennox	"Why"	Annie Lennox	Won	
1993	Eric Clapton, Will Jennings	"Tears in Heaven"	Eric Clapton	Nominated	
1993	Andy Partridge	"The Disappointed"	XTC	Nominated	
1994	Sting	"If I Ever Lose My Faith in You"	Sting	Won	
1994	Steve Duberry, Billy Lawrie, Lulu	"I Don't Wanna Fight"	Tina Turner	Nominated	
1994	Simon Le Bon, Nick Rhodes, John Taylor, Warren Cuccurullo	"Ordinary World"	Duran Duran	Nominated	
1995	Andy Hill, Peter Sinfield	"Think Twice"	Celine Dion	Won	
1995	Mark Nevin, Kirsty McColl	"Dear John"	Eddi Reader	Nominated	
1995	Boo Hewerdine	"Patience of Angels"	Eddi Reader	Nominated	
1996	Jarvis Cocker, Nick Banks, Candida Doyle, Steve Mackey, Russell Senior	"Common People"	Pulp	Won	
1996	Gary Barlow	"Back for Good"	Take That	Nominated	
1996	David Freeman, Joseph Hughes	"No More "I Love You's""	Annie Lennox	Nominated	
1997	Brian May, Frank Musker, Elizabeth Lamers	"Too Much Love Will Kill You"	Brian May	Won	
1997	Terence Martin, Karen Poole, Michelle Poole	"I Am, I Feel"	Alisha's Attic	Nominated	
1997	Thomas Scott, Andrew Parle, James Edwards, Franny Griffiths	"Neighbourhood"	Space	Nominated	
1998	Thom Yorke, Jonny Greenwood, Phil Selway, Colin Greenwood, Ed O'Brien	"Paranoid Android"	Radiohead	Won	
1998	Robbie Williams, Guy Chambers	"Angels"	Robbie Williams	Nominated	
1998	Tjinder Singh	"Brimful of Asha"	Cornershop	Nominated	
1999	Brian Higgins, Steve Torch, Paul Barry, Stuart McLennan, Tim Powell, Matt Gray	"Believe"	Cher	Won	
1999	Tracy Ackerman, Ray Hedges, Martin Brannigan, Edele Lynch, Keavy Lynch, Lindsay Armaou, Sinead O'Carroll	"C'est la Vie"	B*Witched	Nominated	
1999	Jarvis Cocker, Nick Banks, Candida Doyle, Steve Mackey, Mark Webber	"A Little Soul"	Pulp	Nominated	

=== 2000s ===
List of award nominees and winners for the 2000s
Year	Songwriter(s)	Song	Performing artist(s)	Result	Ref.
2000	Robbie Williams, Guy Chambers	"Strong"	Robbie Williams	Won	
2000	Pam Sheyne, David Frank, Steve Kipner	"Genie in a Bottle"	Christina Aguilera	Nominated	
2000	Mutt Lange, Shania Twain	"You're Still the One"	Shania Twain	Nominated	
2001	David Gray	"Babylon"	David Gray	Won	
2001	Cathy Dennis, Simon Ellis	"Never Had a Dream Come True"	S Club 7	Nominated	
2001	Guy Berryman, Jonny Buckland, Will Champion, Chris Martin	"Trouble"	Coldplay	Nominated	
2002	Adam Clayton, The Edge, Bono, Larry Mullen Jr.	"Walk On"	U2	Won	
2002	David Gray	"Sail Away"	David Gray	Nominated	
2002	Fran Healy	"Side"	Travis	Nominated	
2003	David Gray	"The Other Side"	David Gray	Won	
2003	Noel Gallagher	"Stop Crying Your Heart Out"	Oasis	Nominated	
2003	Matthew Hales, Kim Oliver	"Strange & Beautiful (I'll Put A Spell On You)"	Aqualung	Nominated	
2004	Francis Eg White	"Leave Right Now"	Will Young	Won	
2004	Stuart Murdoch, Stephen Jackson, Christopher Geddes, Richard Colburn, Michael Cooke, Sarah Martin, Robert Kildea	"Step into My Office, Baby"	Belle and Sebastian	Nominated	
2004	Dido Armstrong, Rollo Armstrong, Richard Nowels	"White Flag"	Dido	Nominated	
2005	Mike Skinner	"Dry Your Eyes"	The Streets	Won	
2005	Tom Chaplin, Richard Hughes, Tim Rice-Oxley	"Everybody's Changing"	Keane	Nominated	
2005	Stephen Kipner, Andrew Frampton, Natasha Bedingfield, Wayne Wilkins	"These Words"	Natasha Bedingfield	Nominated	
2006	KT Tunstall	"Suddenly I See"	KT Tunstall	Won	
2006	Guy Berryman, Jonathan Buckland, William Champion, Chris Martin	"Fix You"	Coldplay	Nominated	
2006	Alex Turner	"I Bet You Look Good on the Dancefloor"	Arctic Monkeys	Nominated	
2007	Scott Matthews	"Elusive"	Scott Matthews	Won	
2007	Nerina Pallot	"Sophia"	Nerina Pallot	Nominated	
2007	Alex Turner	"When the Sun Goes Down"	Arctic Monkeys	Nominated	
2008	Amy Winehouse	"Love Is a Losing Game"	Amy Winehouse	Won	
2008	Rosi Golan, Jamie Hartman	"Let Me Out"	Ben's Brother	Nominated	
2008	Amy Winehouse	"You Know I'm No Good"	Amy Winehouse	Nominated	
2009	Guy Garvey, Richard Jupp, Craig Potter, Mark Potter, Peter Turner	"One Day Like This"	Elbow	Won	
2009	Miles Kane, Alex Turner	"My Mistakes Were Made for You"	The Last Shadow Puppets	Nominated	
2009	Nicholas Hemming	"The Last of the Melting Snow"	The Leisure Society	Nominated	

=== 2010s ===
List of award nominees and winners for the 2010s
Year	Songwriter(s)	Song	Performing artist(s)	Result	Ref.
2010	Lily Allen, Greg Kurstin	"The Fear"	Lily Allen	Won	
2010	Nick Hemming	"Save It for Someone Who Cares"	The Leisure Society	Nominated	
2010	Ed Adlard, Will Adlard, Ali Digby, George Eddy	"The Last Bus"	Patch William	Nominated	
2011	Conor O'Brien	"Becoming a Jackal"	Villagers	Won	
2011	Jonathan Higgs, Jeremy Pritchard, Alexander Robertshaw, Michael Spearman	"My Kz, Ur Bf"	Everything Everything	Nominated	
2011	Jack Bevan, Edwin Congreave, Walter Gervers, Yannis Philippakis, James Smith	"Spanish Sahara"	Foals	Nominated	
2012	Ed Sheeran	"The A Team"	Ed Sheeran	Won	
2012	Adele, Paul Epworth	"Rolling in the Deep"	Adele	Nominated	
2012	Paul Epworth, Kid Harpoon, Florence Welch	"Shake It Out"	Florence + the Machine	Nominated	
2013	Hugo Chegwin, Harry Craze, Anup Paul, Emeli Sandé	"Next to Me"	Emeli Sandé	Won	
2013	Natasha Khan, Justin Parker	"Laura"	Bat for Lashes	Nominated	
2013	Iain Archer, Jake Bugg	"Two Fingers"	Jake Bugg	Nominated	
2014	Dominic Major, Hannah Reid, Daniel Rothman	"Strong"	London Grammar	Won	
2014	Will Doyle, Sam Fryer, Chilli Jesson, Pete Mayhew	"Best of Friends"	Palma Violets	Nominated	
2014	John Newman, Steve Booker	"Love Me Again"	John Newman	Nominated	
2015	Andrew Hozier-Byrne	"Take Me to Church"	Hozier	Won	
2015	Andrew Davie	"Above the Clouds of Pompeii"	Bear's Den	Nominated	
2015	Ben Howard	"I Forget Where We Were"	Ben Howard	Nominated	
2016	Jamie Lawson	"Wasn't Expecting That"	Jamie Lawson	Won	
2016	Piers Aggett, Kesi Dryden, Amir Izadkhah, Gary Lightbody, Johnny McDaid, Leon Rolle, Ed Sheeran	"Bloodstream"	Ed Sheeran	Nominated	
2016	Ellie Rowsell	"Bros"	Wolf Alice	Nominated	
2017	Dean 'Inflo' Joisah Cover, Michael Kiwanuka	"Black Man in a White World"	Michael Kiwanuka	Won	
2017	Laura Mvula, Nile Rodgers	"Overcome"	Laura Mvula	Nominated	
2017	Blaine Harrison, Henry Harrison	"Telomere"	Mystery Jets	Nominated	
2018	Guy Garvey, Craig Potter, Mark Potter, Pete Turner	"Magnificent (She Says)"	Elbow	Won	
2018	Jonathan Higgs, Jeremy Pritchard, Alex Robertshaw, Michael Spearman	"Can't Do"	Everything Everything	Nominated	
2018	Sampha	"(No One Knows Me) Like the Piano"	Sampha	Nominated	
2019	Ben Howard	"Nica Libres at Dusk"	Ben Howard	Won	
2019	Alex Turner	"Four Out of Five"	Arctic Monkeys	Nominated	
2019	Andrew Hozier-Byrne	"Nina Cried Power"	Hozier	Nominated	

=== 2020s ===
List of award nominees and winners for the 2020s
Year	Songwriter(s)	Song	Performing artist(s)	Result	Ref.
2020	Jamie Cullum	"Age of Anxiety"	Jamie Cullum	Won	
2020	MJ Cole, Jimmy Napes, Stormzy	"Crown"	Stormzy	Nominated	
2020	Sam Fender	"Dead Boys"	Sam Fender	Nominated	
2021	Barney Lister, Obongjayar	"God's Own Children"	Obongjayar	Won	
2021	Gianluca Buccellati, Arlo Parks	"Black Dog"	Arlo Parks	Nominated	
2021	Headie One, Fred again...	"Gang"	Headie One and Fred again...	Nominated	
2021	Marina Diamandis	"Man's World"	Marina	Nominated	
2021	Celeste and Jamie Hartman	"Stop This Flame"	(Celeste)	Nominated	
2022	Sam Fender	"Seventeen Going Under"	Sam Fender	Won	
2022	Adele, Greg Kurstin	"Easy on Me"	Adele	Nominated	
2022	Mike Elzondo, Natalie Hemby, Ben Jackson-Cook, Rag'n'Bone Man	"All You Ever Wanted"	Rag'n'Bone Man	Nominated	
2022	Sarah Aarons, Holly Humberstone, Rob Milton	"Haunted House"	Holly Humberstone	Nominated	
2022	Ella Henderson, Ben Kohn, Pete "Merf" Kelleher, Tom "Froe" Barnes, James Arthur	"Let's Go Home Together"	Ella Henderson featuring Tom Grennan	Nominated	
2023	Jack Antonoff and Florence Welch	"King"	Florence + The Machine	Won	
2023	Kid Harpoon, Tyler Johnson and Harry Styles	"As It Was"	Harry Styles	Nominated	
2023	Laurie Blundell and Tom Odell	"Best Day of My Life"	Tom Odell	Nominated	
2023	Katie Gregson-MacLeod	"Complex"	Katie Gregson-MacLeod	Nominated	
2023	Dean "Inflo" Josiah Cover and Cleopatra Nikolic	"Stronger"	SAULT	Nominated	
2024	Victoria Canal, Jonny Lattimer, Eg White	"Black Swan"	Victoria Canal	Won	
2024	Laurie Blundell, Max Clilverd, Tom Odell	"Black Friday"	Tom Odell		
2024	Yussef Dayes, Sampha	"Spirit 2.0"	Sampha		
2024	Amber Bain	"Sunshine Baby"	The Japanese House		
2024	Damon Albarn, Graham Coxon, Alex James, Dave Rowntree	"The Narcissist"	Blur		
2025	Orla Gartland	"Mine"	Orla Gartland	Won	
2025	Laura Marling	"Child of Mine"	Laura Marling		
2025	Rodney Jerkins, RAYE, Toneworld	"Genesis"	RAYE		
2025	Grian Chatten, Conor Curley, Conor Deegan, Thomas Coll, Carlos O'Connell	"In the Modern World"	Fontaines D.C.		
2025	Conor Dickinson, Lola Young	"Messy"	Lola Young		
2026	Jacob Alon	"Don't Fall Asleep"	Jacob Alon	Won	
2026	Mark Bowen, Mitski, Florence Welch	"Everybody Scream"	Florence + the Machine		
2026	Johan Hugo, Self Esteem, Pale Jay	"Focus Is Power"	Self Esteem		
2026	Ellie Rowsell	"The Sofa"	Wolf Alice		
2026	Tove Burman, Anya Jones, Jon Shave	"Weeds"	Sugababes		
