= Build a Rocket Boys! =

2011 album by Elbow

Studio album by Elbow
- Released: 4 March 2011
- Recorded: 2009–2010
- Studios: Blueprint Studios (Manchester); Elbow Rooms (Manchester); Real World Studios (Wiltshire); The Church House (Isle of Mull); The Barn (Cheshire)
- Genres: Alternative rock, indie rock
- Length: 51:42
- Labels: Fiction, Polydor
- Producers: Craig Potter, Elbow

Elbow chronology
The Seldom Seen Kid (2008)	Build a Rocket Boys! (2011)	Dead in the Boot (2012)

Singles from Build a Rocket Boys!
- 1. "Neat Little Rows" Released: 27 February 2011; 2. "Open Arms" Released: 24 April 2011; 3. "Lippy Kids" Released: 8 August 2011; 4. "Dear Friends" Released: 5 December 2011

Build a Rocket Boys! is the fifth studio album by English rock band Elbow, released on 4 March 2011 in the UK. Coinciding with the UK release, the album was available digitally in the United States on 8 March and released in the physical format on 12 April. It is the follow-up to the highly successful The Seldom Seen Kid; like its predecessor, the album was self-produced by the band in Blueprint Studios, Manchester. The album was nominated for the 2011 Mercury Prize. It was supported by the Build a Rocket Boys! Tour.

The first single, "Neat Little Rows", was released on 27 February 2011. The song received its first radio airplay on 13 January 2011. The video for the single was produced by The Soup Collective and filmed at Blueprint Studios where the album was recorded. It premiered on 31 January 2011.

== Background ==
The album's title, track listing and cover art were "accidentally" revealed by frontman Guy Garvey on 22 December 2010. It is said to be influenced by Garvey's childhood, as he moved back to the area he grew up in before the album was recorded, and is aimed to appease both their traditional fanbase and those who took a shine to the arena anthems of The Seldom Seen Kid.

The band's success, according to Garvey, made it difficult for the band to continue in the same vein when it came to lyrics. For, as Q magazine put it, "...when heartbreaking melancholia is your currency, success and contentment can be a problem." The group's frontman admitted that due to being "too happy" he had to "look elsewhere for lyrics." "I can't sincerely write about where I'm at because I'm doing OK. It wouldn't work."

Elbow began writing new material and reviewing previous material they'd made on the road in January 2010, while on the Isle of Mull. It was there and then that the new album's major motif began to take shape: that of nostalgia, missing family life and detesting the feeling of being unable to settle in. "In essence, they realised they've grown up, and the thought set Garvey on a nostalgic, reflective course," according to Q.

The agenda, both thematically and musically, was set by "Jesus Is a Rochdale Girl", a minimalist, Eno-esque track based on Garvey's earlier poem he wrote about his first love. "I think our records have always had light and shade to a degree, this one more so than the others", commented Garvey. A couple of times, when struggling with lyrics, he made trips to Peter Gabriel's Real World Studios in Wiltshire to "share thoughts" with its owner. On such occasions the frontman communicated via video calls with his band, which, on some occasions, had to place the laptop on top of the piano and play the latest versions of songs virtually to Garvey.

"Lippy Kids", according to Q, is a key song: it was written in defence of the British teenager, victim to, as Garvey put it, "the anti-hoody shit that goes on in the media, the thought that if you hang around on a street corner you're a criminal." Speaking of the overall sound and its apparent lack of radio-friendliness, Garvey commented: "We could write deliberate radio hits until the cows come home, but I think you can hear it really obviously when a band has done that." The singer mentioned the relative easiness of the atmosphere in which the album was recorded. "It's the first album we've made without the comedy anvil hanging over our heads," he said.

In January, Guy Garvey sent Q Magazine a 'new album update', mentioning among many things that happened since the magazine's correspondent last visit to the studio:

...We had a pair of young ladies called Cupid's Bow come in and play cello for us. We also crane-lifted a grand piano into the top floor of the studio. Windows had to be removed and it took 12 hours to complete. The 55-strong Halle Youth Choir gave up a Sunday to come in and sing a number of songs. I felt a bit cheeky asking such well-trained vocalists to sound a bit more 'Manc' but they were up to it. So many real musicians under one roof, we were very flattered that they agreed to work with us.

Halle Youth Choir (which performed with the band in 2009) features on six of the tracks, most noticeably, "With Love" and "Open Arms".

In 2012, the song "The Night Will Always Win" was used for the introduction for the video game Call of Duty: Black Ops 2.

== Reception ==
Professional ratings
Aggregate scores
Source	Rating
AnyDecentMusic?	7.9/10
Metacritic	82/100
Review scores
Source	Rating
AllMusic	4/5 stars
The A.V. Club	B+
The Daily Telegraph	5/5 stars
The Guardian	4/5 stars
The Independent	4/5 stars
Mojo	4/5 stars
NME	8/10
Pitchfork	6.9/10
Q	4/5 stars
Spin	8/10

Critics praised the album highly as it scored a rating of 82 on Metacritic, which indicates "universal acclaim". According to The Daily Telegraph's Helen Brown, Guy Garvey, very much in the vein of artist LS Lowry, "make(s) something moving and original from the experience of the man on the street", drawing "poignant, minimalist sketches of urban life that seem to be observed with a big yearning heart from a remote distance". The band followed the success of Seldom Seen Kid with "greatness and without fuss", providing "…more of the same: richly textured, intelligent and warm stuff", according to the critic.

NME's John Doran, insisting that its 'artistic bravery' that places Elbow "in a different league to other purveyors of emotional atmospheric rock", compares the album favourably to Coldplay's Viva la Vida or Death and All His Friends, noting that the group is "rooted in the sublimely specific and the gloriously mundane" with Guy Garvey here cementing his position of "the laureate of the everyday". "If you've ever been chucked, realised that you miss your parents, or thought that you don't see enough of your mates, then he has written a song that hits the heart of the matter with frightening resonance", writes the reviewer. Not exactly impressed by the track "Lippy Kids" ("which sees him lamenting the shortness of childhood in a manner that threatens to become Hovis ad-esque"), the critic points to "Jesus Is a Rochdale Girl" as a "sublime counterpoint to this", calling it "a beautifully vivid recollection of moving in with someone for the first time." Elbow, according to NME, remain "a gently progressive and subtly innovative force." On the other hand, Alexis Petridis of The Guardian pinpoints "Lippy Kids" as "the album's emotional centre", calling it "a gorgeous meditation on adolescence that recognises both the gauche awfulness of it all [...] and the fact that you may never feel quite as rawly alive again."

Johnny Davis of Q argues that this is an album "that maximizes the use of light and shade"; this is what makes it different from The Seldom Seen Kid, which was full of "autumnal melancholy". According to Ian Cohen of Pitchfork, Elbow, who are more than ever "hitching their fortunes to their lead singer" have recorded "by a large margin their quietest record to date, the closest thing to a Garvey solo album we've heard."

== Commercial performance ==
The album debuted at number 2 on the UK album chart with first week sales of 78,177 units, having been kept off the top by the sixth week sales of Adele's album 21. In 2011, Build a Rocket Boys! sold 327,000 copies in the UK.

== Track listing ==
All lyrics written by Guy Garvey; all music composed by Elbow.

No.	Title	Length
1.	"The Birds"	8:03
2.	"Lippy Kids"	6:06
3.	"With Love"	4:12
4.	"Neat Little Rows"	5:39
5.	"Jesus Is a Rochdale Girl"	3:18
6.	"The Night Will Always Win"	4:24
7.	"High Ideals"	5:39
8.	"The River"	2:51
9.	"Open Arms"	4:53
10.	"The Birds" (Reprise)	1:31
11.	"Dear Friends"	5:01

iTunes Deluxe Edition
No.	Title	Length
12.	"The River" (Live Video)	2:52
13.	"Jesus Is a Rochdale Girl" (Live Video)	3:17
14.	"Dear Friends" (Live Video)	4:59

Belgian Live Limited Edition
No.	Title	Length
12.	"The Birds" (Live from Brussels Forest National)	8:16
13.	"Lippy Kids" (Live from Brussels Forest National)	6:30
14.	"The Night Will Always Win" (Live from Antwerp Lotto Arena)	5:06
15.	"Dear Friends" (Live from Antwerp Lotto Arena)	6:12
16.	"Open Arms" (Live from Antwerp Lotto Arena)	5:22

Dutch Live Limited Edition
No.	Title	Length
12.	"The Birds" (Live from Pinkpop)	8:49
13.	"Neat Little Rows" (Live from Lowlands)	7:58
14.	"Lippy Kids" (Live from Pinkpop)	6:52
15.	"The Night Will Always Win" (Live from Lowlands)	4:34
16.	"Open Arms" (Live from Lowlands)	5:40

== Personnel ==
Elbow

- Guy Garvey – vocals; string, brass & choral arrangements
- Mark Potter – guitars
- Craig Potter – keyboards
- Pete Turner – bass
- Richard Jupp – drums

Additional musicians

- John Moseley – lead vocal (track 10)
- The Hallé Youth Choir – additional vocals (tracks 2, 3, 8, 9, 10 & 11)
- Margit Van Der Zwan – cello (tracks 1, 7 & 9)
- Adrianne Wininsky – cello (tracks 1 & 9)
- Stella Page – violin & viola (track 7)
- Bob Marsh – trumpet & flugelhorn (track 7 & 11)

Production

- Craig Potter – production, mixing
- Danny Evans – additional engineering (tracks 2, 3, 8, 9, 10 & 11)
- Tim Young – mastering
- Gregory Batsleer – youth choir director
- Joe Duddell – assistant
- Oliver East – illustrations
- Paul West – layout & design

== Promotion ==
In July 2011, Elbow and Robinson's Brewery announced the release of a cask-ale named after the album. Formally unveiled at the Manchester Food & Drink Festival on 13 October 2011, the beer was available by the cask or in a case of 8 bottles and was served at various Robinson's pubs and the brewery. Originally intended for a two-month run, its popularity kept it an active product until the end of 2013.

== Charts ==
=== Weekly charts ===
Chart (2011)	Peak position
Australian Albums (ARIA)	13
Belgian Albums (Ultratop Flanders)	3
Belgian Albums (Ultratop Wallonia)	47
Danish Albums (Hitlisten)	31
Dutch Albums (Album Top 100)	5
German Albums (Offizielle Top 100)	50
Irish Albums (IRMA)	2
New Zealand Albums (RMNZ)	18
Scottish Albums (Official Charts)	2
Swedish Albums (Sverigetopplistan)	57
Swiss Albums (Schweizer Hitparade)	54
UK Albums (Official Charts)	2
US Billboard 200	151
US Heatseekers Albums (Billboard)	1
US Top Rock Albums (Billboard)	36

=== Year-end charts ===
Chart (2011)	Position
Belgian Albums (Ultratop Flanders)	15
Dutch Albums (Album Top 100)	44
UK Albums (OCC)	31

== Release history ==
Region	Date	Format	Label
Ireland	4 March 2011	Digital Download	Polydor
United Kingdom	4 March 2011	Digital Download	Polydor
