= The Take Off and Landing of Everything =

Studio album by Elbow
- Released: 10 March 2014
- Recorded: 2012–2013
- Studios: Real World Studios, Box, Wiltshire; Blueprint Studios, Salford
- Genres: Art rock; alternative rock; indie rock
- Length: 56:51
- Labels: Fiction, Polydor (UK, Europe, Australia & Canada); Concord (US)
- Producer: Craig Potter

Elbow chronology
Dead in the Boot (2012)	The Take Off and Landing of Everything (2014)	Little Fictions (2017)

Singles from The Take Off and Landing of Everything
- 1. "New York Morning" Released: 27 January 2014; 2. "Charge" Released: 19 April 2014; 3. "My Sad Captains" Released: 26 May 2014; 4. "Real Life (Angel)" Released: 4 August 2014

The Take Off and Landing of Everything is the sixth studio album by English rock band Elbow, released in the UK, Europe, and Australia through Fiction Records and Polydor Records on 10 March 2014 and in the US on Concord Records on 11 March 2014.

Originally recorded with the working title of All at Once and then renamed Carry Her, Carry Me after a line in closing track "The Blanket of Night", the band changed their mind shortly before the album's release and settled on naming the album after one of its tracks. Singer Guy Garvey explained, "It's to do with the fact that there have been [so many] life events. There are five members of the band—people have split up, got together, had children. It never stops, this stuff. Especially round the [age of] 40 mark... and yet I wanted to remain celebratory about that. Everybody's feeling relief, with remorse, next to joy, next to loss. But I think laughing very hard and worrying very little is a good way to keep young."

== Writing and composition ==
Garvey split up with his long-term girlfriend, journalist and novelist Emma Jane Unsworth, during the making of the album, which led him to revise some of the album's lyrics. Talking about the album's opening track, "This Blue World", Garvey originally stated, "It's almost saying, everything from the beginning of time was leading up to the day we met. So that's very romantic, but something I'm fond of doing, when I'm offering a huge romantic gesture, is to point out the realities as well." After the break-up, he said that the song "was about this mythical mix of ex-girlfriends, it's really about her, it's this prophetic thing. I added some lyrics at the end, about imagining her going on and having a family without me, which is tough to swallow."

Unsworth also influenced some of the album's other tracks: she suggested the title of "My Sad Captains" from a line in Shakespeare's play Antony and Cleopatra in which Mark Antony speaks about his drinking partners ("Come, let's have one other gaudy night; call to me all my sad captains; fill our bowls; once more, let's mock the midnight bell"). According to Garvey the song is about "missing my friends that have dropped out of the drinking culture that we all met in, or moved away, or died". The lyrics for "New York Morning" were adapted from one of Garvey's diary entries about a trip he and Unsworth made to New York City. In an interview on radio station XFM on 24 January 2014, he told presenter Jo Good that the lyrics were "pretty much verbatim, 6 o'clock in the morning, in Manhattan in the Moonstruck Café [named after the 1987 film Moonstruck], it's verbatim how I was feeling as the city was waking up". The track was called "The City" for a short while, until Elbow realised the implications of such a name in their home city of Manchester, where the two rival football teams of Manchester United and Manchester City are often referred to as simply "United" and "City", and the band could have been accused of being partisan. Garvey spent a large part of 2012 in New York while working on the King Kong musical, and he told Q magazine that the time he had spent in the city had been a big influence on the album, saying, "I'm having an intense love affair with Brooklyn. One overarching theme on this record is me flitting between Manchester and New York."

"The Blanket of Night" is about a refugee couple attempting to travel to another country by boat. "Charge" is the story of an ageing man drinking in his regular bar, and complaining about the lack of respect shown to him by the bar's younger patrons. Garvey admitted that "the character from the song is definitely me but a bit older". He said that the album's title track, written after the amicable ending of his relationship with Unsworth, had been "born of our love for space rock, prog, Primal Scream and Spiritualized" and that he had wanted the song's lyrics "to be a celebration, not just of the throes of great relationships but of the timely end of things. The landings are as important as the take-offs."

For the first time in their career, Elbow did not write the album together as a group, with band members composing songs separately and bringing them to the other members when they were almost completed. Keyboard player and producer Craig Potter was chiefly responsible for "Real Life (Angel)", his brother guitarist Mark Potter wrote and recorded "Honey Sun" at home; bassist Pete Turner composed "Colour Fields" using apps on his iPad; and the rhythm section of Turner, Mark Potter and drummer Richard Jupp created "Fly Boy Blue/Lunette" in the studio in the absence of Garvey and of Mark's brother Craig.

== Recording ==
The group spent the first two weeks of the album's recording at Peter Gabriel's Real World Studios in November 2012, before moving back to their own Blueprint Studios in Salford to complete the album. Speaking about the decision to start the recording process at Real World, Garvey said, "When you're there, you get six months work done in two weeks. To go and live and breathe your record without the distractions of the rest of life, you make creative decisions you would not have made at home."

As with the songwriting, Elbow broke with their traditional method of recording together as a group, and—on the advice of an engineer at Abbey Road Studios—they instead recorded their parts separately at different times in the studio.

== Release and promotion ==
The album was released in three versions: CD, deluxe digipak CD, and double vinyl LP. The track "Fly Boy Blue/Lunette" was made available as a digital download on 15 January 2014. On the same day, Elbow's YouTube channel posted a video of the band performing the song in the studio, directed by long-time collaborators The Soup Collective. The song belatedly debuted on the UK Singles Chart at number 183 on 9 March 2014. The first official single from the album was "New York Morning", released on 27 January 2014. The video for the single featured Dennis and Lois, the New York couple who had become famous for their patronage of the New York alternative music scene since the 1970s.

On Record Store Day on 19 April 2014 Elbow released "Charge" as a 7" single, limited to 1000 copies. This single featured the song on the A-side and an etching of the album cover instead of a song on the B-side.

== Reception ==
Professional ratings
Aggregate scores
Source	Rating
Metacritic	80/100
Review scores
Source	Rating
AllMusic	4/5 stars
Consequence of Sound	B−
The Daily Telegraph	5/5 stars
Drowned in Sound	8/10
The Guardian	4/5 stars
Mojo	4/5 stars
NME	6/10
Pitchfork	6.2/10
Q	5/5 stars
Slant Magazine	4/5 stars

The Take Off and Landing of Everything has received acclaim from music critics. At Metacritic, which assigns a normalized rating out of 100 to reviews from mainstream critics, the album has received an average score of 80 based on 28 reviews, indicating "generally favourable reviews". Many critics praised the band for moving on from the previous success as the last two albums into something of their own.

Writing for The Daily Telegraph, reviewer Neil McCormick awarded The Take Off and Landing of Everything a maximum score of five stars, stating that it was "fantastic: an album of world-beating standard yet still intimate and friendly, an epic of the everyday, a romance of the real." Drowned in Sound's Aaron Lavery was similarly impressed, describing it as "a record that's designed to be listened to as a whole, complete with a sense of mood and place that runs throughout", before concluding that it was "an impressive feat indeed" and scoring the album eight out of ten. In his review for The Guardian, music critic Alexis Petridis accorded the album a rating of four stars out of five, and noted that "instead of pushing obvious buttons, The Take Off and Landing of Everything concentrates on what Elbow do best: Northern snug-philosopher wisdom...buoyed by music that's subtly expansive and adventurous".

Q's Tom Doyle hailed the album, saying, "These 10 magnificent songs see the singer and lyricist trying to get his head around life, death, love, the universe and what he calls 'the mysteries of the human heart'... Always musically sure-footed and prog-minded – less, of course, in terms of never-ending solos; more in the sense that you never know what's up next sonically – here Elbow stretch themselves musically without tearing up their original blueprint... Topping even The Seldom Seen Kid, The Take Off... is the perfect expression yet of everything that is Elbow. As their best album to date, it will lift yor heart and fill your soul." Referring to the group's concert at Jodrell Bank in 2012, Mojo's Victoria Segal noted, "You don't need the world's largest radio telescope to pick up the issues of mortality and make-or-break change pulsing through the record... Plotting their course through these highs and lows – those take-offs and landings – Elbow are no clearer than anyone else about how they will reach the final destination. By sharing that uncertainty and navigating by what little light there is, artistically, at least, they never lose their way."

Some critics were disappointed that the band had stayed too close to the sound of their previous records, with NME reviewer Emily Mackay saying that "too often you feel the band collapse back into comfy...making music shouldn't always be as easy as giving someone a big sonic hug"; Mackay awarded the album six out of ten. Pitchfork Media's Jason Heller, who scored The Take Off and Landing of Everything 6.2 out of 10.0, shared this view, stating that "the album dangles there, an effortlessly leaden exhibition of glum triumphalism—and an example of what makes Elbow, at its least potent, so subtly unsubtle."

== Track listing ==
All lyrics are written by Guy Garvey; all music is composed by Elbow.

No.	Title	Length
1.	"This Blue World"	7:13
2.	"Charge"	5:16
3.	"Fly Boy Blue/Lunette"	6:23
4.	"New York Morning"	5:19
5.	"Real Life (Angel)"	6:47
6.	"Honey Sun"	4:56
7.	"My Sad Captains"	6:00
8.	"Colour Fields"	3:42
9.	"The Take Off and Landing of Everything"	7:11
10.	"The Blanket of Night"	4:24

== Personnel ==
Elbow:

- Guy Garvey – vocals, strings and horns arrangements
- Richard Jupp – drums
- Craig Potter – keyboards
- Mark Potter – guitar
- Pete Turner – bass

Additional personnel:

- Tim Barber – trumpet on "New York Morning" and "My Sad Captains"
- Katharine Curlett – trumpet on "New York Morning" and "My Sad Captains"
- Jimi Goodwin – backing vocals on "New York Morning"
- Peter McPhail – baritone saxophone, clarinet and sopranino saxophone on "Fly Boy Blue/Lunette", alto saxophone and baritone saxophone on "New York Morning"
- Bob Marsh – trumpet on "My Sad Captains"
- The Hallé Orchestra – strings on "Charge", "Real Life (Angel)" and "Honey Sun"
- Chris Worsley – score on "Charge" and "Real Life (Angel)"

== Charts ==
=== Weekly charts ===
Chart (2014)	Peak position
Australian Albums (ARIA)	12
Austrian Albums (Ö3 Austria)	29
Belgian Albums (Ultratop Flanders)	1
Belgian Albums (Ultratop Wallonia)	15
Danish Albums (Hitlisten)	25
Dutch Albums (Album Top 100)	4
French Albums (SNEP)	183
German Albums (Offizielle Top 100)	22
Italian Albums (FIMI)	61
Irish Albums (IRMA)	1
New Zealand Albums (RMNZ)	29
Scottish Albums (Official Charts)	1
Swiss Albums (Schweizer Hitparade)	30
UK Albums (Official Charts)	1
US Billboard 200	83
US Top Alternative Albums (Billboard)	14
US Top Current Albums (Billboard)	80
US Heatseekers Albums (Billboard)	1
US Top Rock Albums (Billboard)	20

=== Year-end charts ===
Chart (2014)	Position
Belgian Albums (Ultratop Flanders)	34
Dutch Albums (Album Top 100)	91
UK Albums (OCC)	32

== Release history ==
Region	Date	Label	Format	Catalog
United Kingdom & Europe	10 March 2014	Fiction	CD	3754767
United Kingdom & Europe	10 March 2014	Fiction	deluxe digipak CD	3754768
United Kingdom & Europe	10 March 2014	Fiction	double LP	3754769
Canada	11 March 2014	Fiction	CD	
United States	11 March 2014	Concord	CD	CRE-35323-02
United States	25 March 2014	Concord	double LP	3754769
