= Audio Vertigo =

2024 studio album by Elbow

- Cover of standard edition

Studio album by Elbow
- Released: 22 March 2024
- Recorded: 2023
- Studio: Band members' home studios, UK; Migration, Gloucestershire, UK; The Dairy, London, UK
- Length: 39:10
- Label: Polydor
- Producer: Craig Potter

Elbow chronology
Flying Dream 1 (2021)	Audio Vertigo (2024)	Audio Vertigo Echo (2025)

Singles from Audio Vertigo
- 1. "Lovers' Leap" Released: 25 January 2024; 2. "Balu" Released: 1 March 2024; 3. "Good Blood Mexico City" Released: 12 March 2024; 4. "Things I've Been Telling Myself for Years" Released: 22 March 2024

Audio Vertigo (stylised in all caps as AUDIO VERTIGO) is the tenth studio album by British alternative rock band Elbow, released on 22 March 2024 via Polydor Records. It received acclaim from critics, and debuted at number one on the UK Albums Chart, becoming the band's fourth number-one album in the UK.

== Composition and recording ==
Singer Guy Garvey told Under the Radar that the record had been influenced by the Beastie Boys, Sly and the Family Stone, Jimi Hendrix, Cream and the Meters. The band members had all agreed that they wanted the record to have shorter tracks than on previous albums, and ones that focused on beats. Drummer Alex Reeves, who had asked to have more creative input on the record, started by creating drum patterns in his home studio along with keyboardist and producer Craig Potter, and sent them to the other band members to work on. The band spent two weeks at Migration Studios in Gloucestershire to work on writing the songs, and then relocated to their own Blueprint Studios in Salford to finish the record. The studio's main room was booked out, so the band had to play together in a smaller room. Garvey said that the result of the band members forced proximity to each other in the room was that "the riffs became very simple, and the drums took up a lot of space", resulting in the album's sound.

Garvey stated that many of the lyrics on the album, particularly for "The Picture" and "Poker Face", had been inspired by toxic relationships in the past, both his own and those of other people he knew. "Lovers Leap" tells the story of a pair of lovers so infatuated with each other that they decide to commit suicide by leaping off a high point, and then spraying graffiti on the wall below the point where they died.

"Very Heaven" is an autobiographical account of when Garvey left his family home at the age of 17 and moved in to a house which he shared with other people, and his experiences of sex, drugs and misbehaviour.

The title of the track "Balu" is a corruption of Baloo, the bear from The Jungle Book, and is the nickname of Garvey's nephew. Garvey appropriated the name to create a composite fictional character, using characteristics from the personalities of several of his friends. Garvey stated that the lyrics reflected the problems he had had with some of his friends when Elbow had become successful, and their difficulties in reconciling Garvey's fame with their working-class lives.

"Her to the Earth" had been written by Craig Potter and bassist Pete Turner, but the other members of the band were unconvinced by the song until they decided to use the drum pattern of Talk Talk's "Happiness Is Easy" along with the melody. Garvey said that it was the only track on the album with lyrics that reflected the state of the world, as he had "made a deliberate decision not to reflect all the stuff that's on our minds on this record, because I don't want to listen to music about it".

"Good Blood Mexico City", mostly written by guitarist Mark Potter, is a "little uplifting homage" to the late Foo Fighters drummer Taylor Hawkins, whom Elbow had met when the band and Foo Fighters had both played the Corona Capital music festival in Mexico City in 2017. Garvey had also been impressed by the festival's audience, describing the Mexican people as "political, passionate, and very warm and welcoming".

Closing song "From the River" was written by Garvey to his young son, telling him to go out and do what he wants in the world.

== Promotion ==
On 20 October 2023, Elbow announced a list of UK arena dates for May 2024. The band's singer Guy Garvey told NME that their forthcoming album would be "in very sharp contrast to [Flying Dream 1]" (2021), the band's previous album, stating that while Flying Dream 1 was "a beautiful, gentle record", the new album "deals with some pretty inky stuff ... all set to a very thick, guitar, drum and groove-based thing".

On 25 January 2024, the band announced the album's title, Audio Vertigo, and its release date of 22 March 2024, and shared the first single from the album, "Lovers' Leap".

The album was promoted by two more singles ahead of its release: "Balu" was released on 1 March 2024, and "Good Blood Mexico City" on 12 March 2024. A fourth single, "Things I've Been Telling Myself for Years", was released on the same day as the album on 22 March 2024.

== Critical reception ==
Professional ratings
Aggregate scores
Source	Rating
AnyDecentMusic?	8.1/10
Metacritic	86/100
Review scores
Source	Rating
The Arts Desk	5/5 stars
Clash	9/10
Classic Rock	9/10 stars
The Guardian	4/5 stars
The Independent	3/5 stars
The Irish Times	4/5 stars
Mojo	4/5 stars
NME	4/5 stars
Uncut	8/10
Under the Radar	8/10

Audio Vertigo received acclaim from critics, with several calling it the band's "best album in years". It has a score of 86 out of 100 on review aggregator Metacritic based on eleven critics' reviews, indicating "universal acclaim". In Uncut, John Lewis noted the "wonderful turns of phrase" and called the album "top stuff", while James McNair of Mojo stated that "a panoply of touchstones informs Audio Vertigo, from Arctic Monkeys' recent spy-noir to Fela Kuti grooves to Smithsian indie ... ennobling imagination-overload songs about self-deception, toxic relationships, and a real-life knife fight Elbow's frontman saw in Istanbul", while "Garvey's allusive, playful lyrics are as golden as those of your Bermans and Caves here". In Classic Rock, Chris Roberts described the record as "wild, sweaty fun" with "influences from Marc Bolan to Tom Waits", but that "the energy and buoyancy never sacrifice Elbow's innate knack for emotional impact, as Garvey sings with poetic accuracy of the abyss, various hallelujahs and the meaning of love".

Kathryn Reilly of The Arts Desk stated that "The entire album is dirtier and freer and, as ever, they seem to pull something extra out of the bag" and called the record "another triumph that deepens with every listen." Mark Beaumont in The Independent was more critical, saying that the album preferred "to evoke the skittering polyrhythms, dank moods and spare melodies of early records such as 2001's Asleep in the Back ... but beyond 'Lovers Leap' and the buzz rock bits of 'Balu', 'The Picture', and 'Good Blood Mexico City', little else on Audio Vertigo slashes out of the speakers at you". Writing for The Irish Times, Lauren Murphy called Audio Vertigo "an enjoyable tussle between offbeat, weird indie tunes and anthemic, beefy war cries", and that "It sounds as if Elbow have rediscovered the sense of experimentation that informed their early material ... the sound of a band not just surviving but creatively thriving".

NME's Andrew Trendell said that the album had an "impish spirit" and would be "the grit in the oyster of their catalogue", concluding that "this is a record to be enjoyed in its fullest form with all its hefty meat, mirrorball flashes and grizzly peaks". In The Guardian, Dave Simpson stated that the album features "bubbling synths, playful orchestrations, African-inspired rhythms ... The lyrics, meanwhile, are a darkly humorous rumination on how we romanticise tragic youth", but that "for all Elbow's adventures, the foundations are still classy songwriting, heart and soul". For Under the Radar, Matt the Raven stated that "in classic Elbow style, the songs on Audio Vertigo sound unmistakably Elbow, but also like nothing you might expect", describing the album as "excellent" and "a testament to the band's gifted musicianship, capable songwriting, and mindset to create something special". Christopher Connor of Clash called the album "a stellar record" and "a hugely eclectic tapestry of influences, woven together seamlessly", and that it was "an album that further cements their legacy and feels like it captures elements from across their 20-year career into something wholly new and exciting".

== Track listing ==
All lyrics are written by Guy Garvey; all music is composed by Guy Garvey, Craig Potter, Mark Potter, Pete Turner and Alex Reeves.

Audio Vertigo track listing
No.	Title	Length
1.	"Things I've Been Telling Myself for Years"	3:33
2.	"Lovers' Leap"	4:34
3.	"(Where Is It?)"	0:26
4.	"Balu"	3:52
5.	"Very Heaven"	3:46
6.	"Her to the Earth"	5:00
7.	"The Picture"	3:31
8.	"Poker Face"	1:42
9.	"Knife Fight"	3:33
10.	"Embers of Day"	0:38
11.	"Good Blood Mexico City"	2:52
12.	"From the River"	5:43
Total length:		39:10

Audio Vertigo (extended edition) track listing
No.	Title	Writer(s)	Length
13.	"Lovers' Leap" (live with the BBC Concert Orchestra)		4:37
14.	"We Have All the Time in the World" (live with the BBC Concert Orchestra)	John Barry; Hal David	3:16

== Personnel ==
Credits are adapted from the album's liner notes.

Elbow

- Guy Garvey – vocals, horn arrangements
- Craig Potter – keyboards, producer, mixing
- Mark Potter – guitars
- Pete Turner – bass
- Alex Reeves – drums

Additional personnel

- Sarah Field – trumpet, saxophones
- Carol Jarvis – trombones
- Victoria Rule – trumpet
- Ella Hohnen-Ford, Kianja, Eliza Oakes – additional backing vocals
- Jack Heyworth, Elvin Reeves, Otto Simpson, Jack Stirling Garvey, Martha Turner, Ted Turner – kids choir

Production

- Danny Evans – engineer
- Charlie Leake – additional engineering on "Things I've Been Telling Myself for Years", "Balu" and "Her to the Earth"
- Dicky – co-engineer on "Lovers' Leap", assistant engineer on "Things I've Been Telling Myself for Years", "Balu", "Her to the Earth", "Knife Fight" and "Good Blood Mexico City"
- Ronan Murphy – assistant engineer on "Things I've Been Telling Myself for Years", "Balu" and "Her to the Earth"
- Thurston Jepps – assistant engineer on "Her to the Earth"
- Matt Colton – mastering at Metropolis Mastering, London
- Richard Andrews – design at Supermatic
- Peter Neill – contributing photography

== Audio Vertigo Echo ==
Audio Vertigo Echo

EP by Elbow
- Released: 6 June 2025
- Recorded: 2024
- Length: 17:32
- Label: Polydor
- Producer: Craig Potter

Elbow chronology
Audio Vertigo (2024)	Audio Vertigo Echo (2025)

Singles from Audio Vertigo
- 1. "Adriana Again" Released: 7 November 2024; 2. "Sober" Released: 9 May 2025; 3. "Dis-Graceland 463-465 Bury New Road" Released: 23 May 2025

On 6 June 2025 they released Audio Vertigo Echo, a 4 track EP created after the release of Audio Vertigo.

In November 2024, Elbow released single "Adriana Again" as the first track of an upcoming EP along with a music video featuring a mystery band. The band wanted to give the sound from Audio Vertigo "another crack", as Garvey put it.

Audio Vertigo Echo track listing
No.	Title	Length
1.	"Dis-Graceland 463-465 Bury New Road"	4:14
2.	"Adriana Again"	3:46
3.	"Timber"	4:44
4.	"Sober"	4:46
Total length:		17:32

== Charts ==
Chart performance for Audio Vertigo
Chart (2024)	Peak position
Belgian Albums (Ultratop Flanders)	7
Belgian Albums (Ultratop Wallonia)	126
Dutch Albums (Album Top 100)	5
German Albums (Offizielle Top 100)	35
Irish Albums (OCC)	28
Scottish Albums (OCC)	2
Swiss Albums (Schweizer Hitparade)	24
UK Albums (OCC)	1
