= Dead in the Boot =

Compilation album by Elbow
- Released: 27 August 2012
- Recorded: 1997–2012
- Genre: Alternative rock, indie rock
- Length: 51:33
- Label: Fiction, Polydor
- Producer: Ben Hillier, Craig Potter, Elbow

Elbow chronology
| Build a Rocket Boys! (2011) | Dead in the Boot (2012) | The Take Off and Landing of Everything (2014) |

Dead in the Boot is a B-sides compilation album by English rock band Elbow, released in the UK on 27 August 2012. The title is a reference to the band's debut album Asleep in the Back and was suggested by singer Guy Garvey's sister Beckie.

== Reception ==
Professional ratings
Review scores
| Source | Rating |
|---|---|
| Allmusic | 3.5/5 stars |
| BBC Music | favourable |
| The Daily Telegraph | 4/5 stars |
| The Independent | 4/5 stars |
| Mojo | 4/5 stars |
| NME | 7/10 |
| Slant Magazine | 4/5 stars |

The reviews for the album were mostly positive, with many reviewers commenting on the overall downbeat nature of the songs. NME noted that "there is a strain of nocturnal lethargy that seems to run through Elbow's flipsides... it's odd that its somnolent air actually renders it slightly one-note... But there's nothing wrong with a gentle head massage after a hard night." The Daily Telegraph described the tracks as "mostly steady, lo-fi grooves, propelled by blue-collar bluesy riffs, detached electronic bleeps and mournful pianos", and stated that "in the best possible sense, these songs are come-downs, reflective descents from the band's often soaring, more melody-driven A-sides. They may have been left in the band's boot for a while, but there's nothing dead about them." Mojo called it "an accomplished compilation" and proclaimed that "Dead in the Boot is less throwaway than its name suggests."

BBC Music said "This is more than just a stopgap between the albums, and while not exactly standing alongside their best in terms of outright quality, shows that even Elbow's 'hidden' past is worthy of deeper exploration." The Independent had some criticisms, saying that the album was "far from exhaustive, with tracks cherry-picked for quality and sequenced non-chronologically. Indeed, if anything, there's a touch too many of the tender piano ostinatos", but overall opining that "most B-sides compilations seem to have been thrown together to fulfil contracts but Dead in the Boot has a form and substance beyond that".

== Track listing ==
All lyrics are written by Guy Garvey; all music is composed by Elbow.

| No. | Title | Originally from | Length |
|---|---|---|---|
| 1. | "Whisper Grass" | "Fallen Angel" CD single, 2003 | 4:30 |
| 2. | "Lucky with Disease" | "Newborn" CD single, 2001 | 3:44 |
| 3. | "Lay Down Your Cross" | "Not a Job" CD single, 2004 | 4:41 |
| 4. | "The Long War Shuffle" | "Leaders of the Free World" CD single, 2005 | 4:14 |
| 5. | "Every Bit the Little Girl" | "One Day Like This" 7" vinyl single, 2008 | 4:25 |
| 6. | "Love Blown Down" | "Fugitive Motel" CD single, 2003 | 4:30 |
| 7. | "None One" | The Newborn EP, 2000 | 3:44 |
| 8. | "Lullaby" | "One Day Like This" CD single, 2008 | 3:15 |
| 9. | "McGreggor" | "Forget Myself" 7" vinyl single, 2005 | 2:40 |
| 10. | "Buffalo Ghosts" | "Open Arms" 10" vinyl single, 2011 | 3:37 |
| 11. | "Waving from Windows" | "Grace Under Pressure"/"Switching Off" CD single, 2004 | 4:14 |
| 12. | "Snowball" | Help!: A Day in the Life album, 2005 | 5:01 |
| 13. | "Gentle As" | "Leaders of the Free World" 7" vinyl single, 2005 | 2:58 |
| Total length: | | | 51:33 |

== Personnel ==
Elbow

- Guy Garvey – vocals, slide guitar on "The Long War Shuffle", string, percussion, brass & choral arrangements
- Mark Potter – guitars
- Craig Potter – keys, percussion
- Pete Turner – bass
- Richard Jupp – drums, percussion

== Release history ==
| Region | Date | Format | Label |
|---|---|---|---|
| United Kingdom | 27 August 2012 | CD, LP, digital download | Polydor |
| United States | 19 November 2012 | CD, LP, digital download | Xenon |
