= Courting the Squall =

Studio album by Guy Garvey
- Released: October 30, 2015
- Recorded: Real World Studios, Box, Wiltshire, England
- Label: Polydor

Courting the Squall is the debut solo album by the English musician Guy Garvey, who is best known as the lead singer of Elbow. It was released on 30 October 2015 in the UK through Polydor.

== Reception ==
Writing in Mojo, James McNair said:

'Courting the Squall' finds Garvey and 'his favourite players outside elbow' on superlative, genre-hopping form. The minimalist marvel of in-the-pocket groove that is 'Unwind' blossoms thanks to Pete Jobson of I Am Kloot's divine guitar motif. Harder Edges and Belly Of The Whale mine a kind of wiry, colliery funk and Electricity, a perfectly weighted duet with Jolie Holland, soothes and transports like some between the wars jazz standard. Better yet, Garvey's poetics have acquired still more acuity, and never more so than on the sublime Marxaphone and Pixaphone infused reverie 'Juggernaut'.

The Independent said:

At the album’s heart, however, are the sketched impressions of quiet emotional turmoil that have become part of Garvey’s stock-in-trade, a personal space bookended here by the ebullient energy so charmingly contained by the plaintive melodica, cycling piano and dulcimer of 'Juggernaut' and the gloom that finds him "missing that moody girl" in 'Harder Edges'. "I’m sick of ticking boredom, counting down the beating hours,” he notes; “She was capable of kind, but not inclined" – a couplet that carries a whole world of regret.

Helen Brown of The Daily Telegraph said:

The result is more urgent, less reassuringly structured than your typical Elbow record. Gone are the cross currents of texture, soaring melodies and matey glow. But it's exciting to hear Garvey out on a limb, his windblown voice often striking out alone across the bare wire of a basic groove.

Rob Mesure of musicOMH concluded the album was "as down-to-earth and likeable as its creator" and said it was "an enjoyable collection that mostly avoids the pitfalls of solo albums by members of successful bands that are still very much a going concern."

== Track listing ==
The track listing of the album was confirmed on iTunes.

No.	Title	Length
1.	"Angela's Eyes"	3:44
2.	"Courting the Squall"	4:30
3.	"Harder Edges"	5:28
4.	"Unwind"	5:49
5.	"Juggernaut"	5:36
6.	"Yesterday"	5:06
7.	"Electricity" (feat. Jolie Holland)	3:41
8.	"Belly of the Whale"	3:54
9.	"Broken Bottles and Chandeliers"	4:33
10.	"Three Bells"	2:54

== Personnel ==
=== Musicians ===
- Brass arrangements – Guy Garvey
- Bass – Nathan Sudders
- Drums, percussion – Alex Reeves
- Guitar – Pete Jobson
- Harp – Rachael Gladwin
- Vibes – Heron
- Piano, synthesizer – Ben Christophers
- Saxophone – Anna Kirby
- Trumpet – Victoria Rule
- Trumpet, saxophone – Sarah Field
- Vocals – Guy Garvey, Jolie Holland

=== Production ===
- Score – Chris Worsey
- Recording Assistants – Oli Jacobs, Patrick Philips, Tim Thomas
- Producers – Danny Evans, Guy Garvey
- Engineering, mixing – Danny Evans
- Mastering – Tim Young
- Management – Phil Chadwick, Sharon Chadwick, TRC
- Photography – Deirdre O'Callaghan
- Design – Paul West

== Charts ==
Chart (2015)	Peak position
Belgian Albums (Ultratop Flanders)	19
Belgian Albums (Ultratop Wallonia)	173
Dutch Albums (Album Top 100)	19
Irish Albums (IRMA)	9
UK Albums (Official Charts)	3
