= Elbow (band) =

English alternative rock band

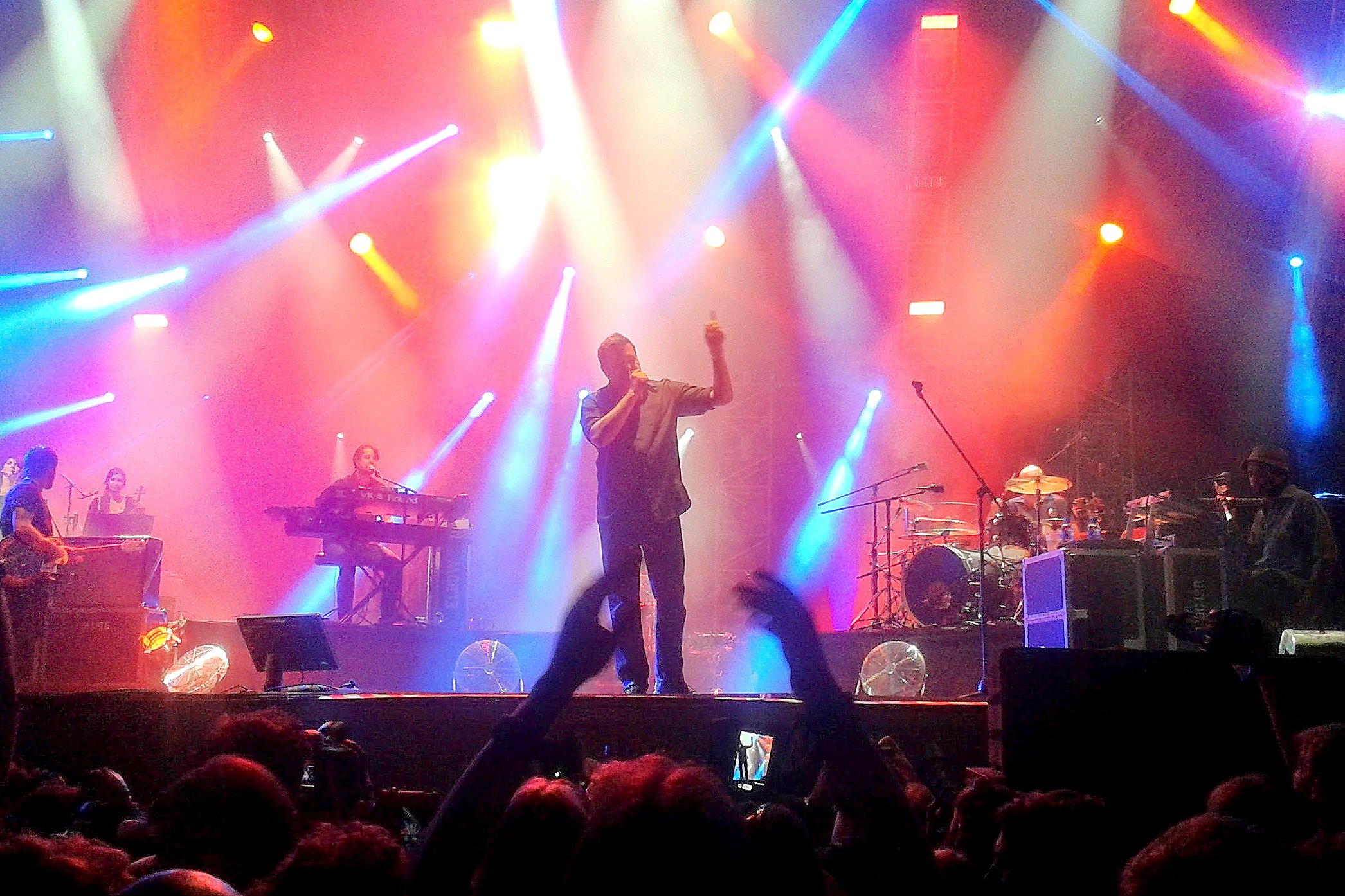
- Elbow performing in 2014

Background information
- Also known as: Mr. Soft (1990–1993); Soft (1993–1997)
- Origin: Bury, Greater Manchester, England
- Genres: Alternative rock; indie rock; art rock; progressive rock; post-Britpop; dream pop
- Years active: 1990–present
- Labels: V2; Fiction; Polydor
- Members: Guy Garvey; Craig Potter; Mark Potter; Pete Turner; Alex Reeves
- Past members: Richard Jupp
- Website: elbow.co.uk

Elbow (stylized in lowercase as elbow) are an English rock band formed in Bury, Greater Manchester, in 1990. The band consists of Guy Garvey (lead vocals, guitar), Craig Potter (keyboard, piano, backing vocals), Mark Potter (guitar, backing vocals), Pete Turner (bass guitar, backing vocals), and Alex Reeves (drums). They have played together since 1990, adopting the name Elbow in 1997. Reeves replaced original drummer Richard Jupp in 2016 as a touring and session musician at first, before becoming a full member in 2024.

The band have released ten studio albums: Asleep in the Back (2001), Cast of Thousands (2003), Leaders of the Free World (2005), The Seldom Seen Kid (2008), Build a Rocket Boys! (2011), The Take Off and Landing of Everything (2014), Little Fictions (2017), Giants of All Sizes (2019), Flying Dream 1 (2021) and Audio Vertigo (2024). Their studio albums, as well as their B-sides compilation Dead in the Boot (2012), all reached the top 15 of the UK Albums Chart. Seven of their singles placed in the top 40 of the British singles chart. Their most recent album, Audio Vertigo, was released on 22 March 2024.

In 2008, Elbow won the Mercury Music Prize for their album The Seldom Seen Kid. In 2009, they won the Brit Award for Best British Group. The same year, the song "One Day Like This" won the Ivor Novello Award for Best Song Musically and Lyrically. In October 2011 NME placed it at number 41 on its list of "150 Best Tracks of the Past 15 Years". After featuring in the 2012 Summer Olympics Closing Ceremony, the single peaked at No. 4 in the UK Singles Chart. In 2012, they released "First Steps", the BBC theme for the 2012 London Olympics.

== History ==
=== 1990-2001: Formation and first EPs ===
After meeting each other in 1990 at the former Stand College in Whitefield near Bury, Greater Manchester, guitarist Mark Potter asked Guy Garvey to sing in a band he was in with drummer Richard Jupp and bassist Pete Turner. Together, the four formed the band Mr. Soft, named after the song by Cockney Rebel (the name was later shortened to Soft). Potter's brother Craig then joined the band on keyboards. That year the band played their first gig together at the Corner Pin pub in Ramsbottom.

They changed their name a second time to Elbow in 1997, inspired by a line in the BBC TV drama The Singing Detective in which the character Philip Marlow describes the word 'elbow' as the loveliest word in the English language. After winning a local Battle of the Bands, the band signed with Island Records and recorded their first album with producer Steve Osborne at Real World Studios. However, Island sold out to major label Universal. The band was dropped in a mass cull and the album was not released.

Elbow continued to record with independent label Ugly Man Records and released The Noisebox EP, The Newborn EP, and The Any Day Now EP. These releases garnered extensive airplay on BBC Radio 1.

=== 2001–2004: Asleep in the Back and Cast of Thousands ===
Elbow's debut album Asleep in the Back was released in May 2001 on V2 Records. The album was written over the course of six years, and contains six rerecorded tracks from the Real World Studios sessions. Asleep in the Back was shortlisted for the Mercury Music Prize and earned the band a BRIT Award nomination for Best New British Band.

The band's second album Cast of Thousands was released in August 2003. The title of the album is a reference to their performance at the 2002 Glastonbury Festival, where they recorded the audience singing, "We still believe in love, so fuck you". The recording is featured on the song "Grace Under Pressure".

In 2004 Elbow toured Cuba, playing songs from Asleep in the Back and Cast of Thousands at venues in and around Havana. British documentary maker Irshad Ashraf filmed a large portion of the tour. The resulting short film was shown at film festivals in 2004, but remains commercially unavailable.

=== 2004–2006: Leaders of the Free World ===
Their third album, Leaders of the Free World, was released in 2005. It was self-produced at Blueprint Studios in Salford, a studio the band hired for the sessions. They teamed up with video artists The Soup Collective to produce an integrated music and video DVD.

In mid-2006, Elbow headlined the Ukula Bright Lights Festival in Toronto's Distillery District.

=== 2006–2009: The Seldom Seen Kid ===
In 2006, the band moved to Fiction Records and completed their fourth studio album The Seldom Seen Kid in late 2007, which was produced and mixed by Craig Potter. The album was released in March 2008 and sold over 1 million copies.

On 9 September 2008, they were awarded the Mercury Music Prize for The Seldom Seen Kid, and in May 2009 the band won two Ivor Novello Awards: "One Day Like This" won the main award for Best Song, and "Grounds for Divorce" was voted Best Contemporary Song. Elbow were also awarded Best International Band at the Meteor Awards in Dublin on 17 March 2009.

Elbow and Bournemouth-based band Air Traffic embarked on an extensive North American tour in May 2008, which was very well received by the media including Blender and Spin magazine. Elbow performed at Delamere Forest in Cheshire on 14 June 2008 as part of the Forestry Commission's 2008 music tours, supported by I Am Kloot. The band commented before the show, "We always love playing gigs in unusual places. We've never done a gig in a forest before so we're really looking forward to it." Elbow appeared on the Other Stage at the Glastonbury Festival on 28 June 2008, joined on stage by violinists and cellists. They performed in the Obelisk Arena at the Latitude Festival on 19 July 2008, and in August played at the Electric Picnic festival. On 9 September, they performed at the National Movie Awards broadcast on ITV, and appeared on BBC2's "Later Live" show hosted by Jools Holland on 23 September.

On 17 January 2009, Elbow gave an exclusive performance of their album The Seldom Seen Kid for BBC Radio 2 and BBC 6 Music together with the BBC Concert Orchestra and London-based chamber choir Chantage at Abbey Road Studios (first broadcast on 31 January 2009). On 14 March 2009, they played Wembley Arena. On 3 July 2009, Elbow played to an audience of 80,000 at Rock Werchter. The next day, Elbow played for approximately 15,000 at Roskilde Festival, Denmark; on stage, Garvey remarked that "last time we played in Denmark, 7 people came." They performed with The Hallé Orchestra and Youth Choir at the Bridgewater Hall as part of the Manchester International Festival on 8 and 9 July 2009. These concerts featured specially-commissioned orchestral and choral arrangements of material spanning all 4 albums. The Hallé musicians and Garvey singers were positioned just to the right of conductor and arranger Joe Duddell.

On 11 July 2009, Elbow played the Main Stage at Oxegen 2009 at Punchestown Racecourse, County Kildare. The band performed on the Main Stage at T in the Park in Balado, Kinross, Scotland, on 12 July 2009. They played the "Escenario Verde" at FIB 2009 in Benicassim, Spain on 18 July. They opened for Coldplay at several stops on the Viva la Vida Tour's 2009 North American leg. They performed at All Points West Music & Arts Festival in Jersey City and the Osheaga Festival in Montreal. On 4 August 2009, Elbow headlined their second show at the 9:30 Club in Washington, DC and on 8 August 2009, they performed at the Center Stage Theatre in Atlanta. They opened for U2 during their August 2009 UK shows at Wembley Stadium in London and the Sheffield Don Valley Stadium.

=== 2009–2011: Build a Rocket Boys! ===
In November 2009, Britain's long-running arts series The South Bank Show aired a 60-minute documentary about Elbow on ITV. Combining live footage of Elbow's September 2009 live performance at Manchester Evening News Arena with an interview between Guy Garvey and presenter Melvyn Bragg, the first half of the documentary focused on Elbow's early career and attempts to get a record deal. The second half discussed songs from Asleep in the Back, Leaders of the Free World and The Seldom Seen Kid. The documentary also contained sequences of Craig Potter demonstrating Elbow's unusual recording techniques at Blueprint Studios, Mark Potter driving around Elbow's old neighbourhood in Bury, Greater Manchester, Pete Turner showing cameras around Manchester's Northern Quarter where the band played their first gigs as Elbow and sequences of Guy Garvey reading through old and new lyric books. Some of the lines Garvey recited became the lyrics to "Jesus Was a Rochdale Girl" and "High Ideals".

Elbow's fifth studio album, Build a Rocket Boys!, was released on 7 March 2011. Upon its release, the album hit Number 2 in the UK album charts, the highest of any Elbow album to date. Build a Rocket Boys! also earned the band their third nomination for the Mercury Prize.

The album had the working title 'Lippy Kids'. Guy Garvey told BBC 6 Music's Shaun Keaveney "It's quite a nostalgic thing. I've got a thing about growing up. Not needing to, but a certain period of your life when – well kids are called 'hoodies' these days aren't they when they reach their teens. I remember it being an amazing important time, so I've written a lot about that."

The album was supported by the Build a Rocket Boys! Tour. On Saturday 11 June 2011, Elbow played at Pinkpop in the Netherlands. On Saturday 25 June 2011, Elbow played the Pyramid stage at Glastonbury 2011, in a performance which music journalist Stuart Maconie described as "career-defining". Between 26 and 28 August 2011 Elbow performed at both Reading and Leeds Festivals, after a long tour of British festivals including Glastonbury 2011.

=== 2011–2012: Dead in the Boot ===
In November 2011, it was announced that Elbow were to compose the theme for the BBC's 2012 Olympic coverage. The six-minute anthem entitled "First Steps" was recorded with the BBC Philharmonic Orchestra and the NovaVox gospel choir. Elbow were also one of the few artists chosen to perform at the 2012 Summer Olympics closing ceremony, where they performed "Open Arms" and "One Day Like This" as the athletes began their entrance into the stadium. This resulted in a sales increase of over 1000%, among the highest of any performers.

Elbow headlined the 2012 Latitude Festival on 14 July. Elbow told Festival Republic that they would only headline the Saturday of Latitude 2012 so they could celebrate the French Revolution by closing their set with a large fireworks display in honour of Bastille Day.

A compilation album called Dead in the Boot was released on 27 August 2012. Described by Garvey as "a real late night vibe", it features B-sides and "hard to find non-album tracks". The title is a reference to Elbow's debut album Asleep in the Back.

=== 2012–2014: The Take Off and Landing of Everything ===
In June 2011, Garvey confirmed to the Daily Mirror that the band had started working on new material for the follow-up to Build a Rocket Boys!, saying, "Rich [drummer Richard Jupp] went into the studio and recorded several different drum patterns for me. I'll go away next week and try and write lyrics for them. We've never worked this way before, but we'll see what happens." The band started recording the album in November 2012, with Turner telling Q magazine that the new album would be "experimental": "We've been going very left-field with things. We are trying out new things". On 30 September 2013, the band simultaneously announced a live album, Live at Jodrell Bank, and the release date of their next studio album as 10 March 2014. Garvey said in an interview with Q that the Manchester band's sixth LP would be called Carry Her Carry Me, after previously having the working title of All at Once.

The group spent two weeks working on the early stages of the album at Peter Gabriel's Real World Studios near Bath. Garvey told NME, "It's the least aptly-named studio in the world. Real World? Is it fuck. But when you're there, you get six months work done in two weeks. To go and live and breathe your record without the distractions of the rest of life, you make creative decisions you would not have made at home."

In January 2014, the band announced that the album's title had changed to The Take Off and Landing of Everything. The album was released on 10 March 2014 and debuted at number one on the UK Albums Chart, becoming the group's first chart-topper.

=== 2015–2018: Departure of Richard Jupp and Little Fictions ===
In July 2015, Elbow released the Lost Worker Bee EP. Announced in June to the NME, Garvey stated "Elbow are involved in various solo projects and collaborative endeavours for the next few months and we just felt we really wanted to get 'something' away to tide fans over until the next album."

In October 2015, Guy Garvey released his first solo album Courting the Squall, preceded by a short UK tour.

On 13 January 2016, Elbow released a 45-second long video filmed by Mark Potter with the tagline "Elbow 7. vibes.", showing the band working on guitar, keyboard and rhythm parts, as a possible indication that the band were in early stages of writing for their seventh album.

It was announced on 6 March 2016, that drummer Richard Jupp would be leaving the group and their forthcoming album would go ahead without him. They have since worked with session drummer Alex Reeves, taking an official photo with him in 2019.

On 27 July 2016, Elbow announced that their new album would be released on 3 February 2017, and would coincide with a British tour that would take place late February through March of the same year. They later released dates and a pre-order link through their website, with the initial cover art being a white background with black text reading "Elbow".

On 6 December 2016, Elbow released further details of the new record. It was revealed the title was Little Fictions, and that it would be released on CD, on vinyl, for digital download, and as a limited edition boxset, all available through their webstore. The lead single, "Magnificent (She Says)", debuted on Jo Whiley's BBC Radio 2 show and was later added to the Elbow YouTube page. On 10 February 2017, Little Fictions reached number 1 on the UK Albums Chart, making the record their second to top the chart.

The band kicked off their US Tour in support of the album on 1 November with a sold-out show at The Paradise Rock Club in Boston, Massachusetts.

The band performed "Magnificent (She Says)" on The Tonight Show Starring Jimmy Fallon on 2 November 2017. Also recorded, but not aired was a shorter version of "One Day Like This" which was released to the Tonight Show's YouTube channel.

On 10 November 2017, Elbow released a cover of "Golden Slumbers" by The Beatles. It was used in the 2017 John Lewis Christmas advert, titled Moz the Monster.

=== 2019: Giants of All Sizes ===
On 1 August 2019, Elbow released the track "Dexter & Sinister" on their official YouTube channel.

On 7 August 2019, Elbow announced their eighth studio album Giants of All Sizes for release on 11 October 2019.

On 4 October 2019, Elbow released the track 'White Noise White Heat' on their official YouTube channel.

=== 2021: Flying Dream 1 ===
On 1 September 2021, Elbow announced their ninth studio album Flying Dream 1 for release on 19 November 2021.

They have released two songs from the album called 'The Seldom Seen Kid' and 'Six Words'

On 4 June 2022 the band performed the song "One Day Like This" at the Platinum Party at the Palace.

=== 2024: Audio Vertigo and addition of Alex Reeves ===
On 25 January 2024, Elbow released single "Lover's Leap" and announced their tenth studio album Audio Vertigo, released on 22 March 2024. Touring and session drummer Alex Reeves contributed to the writing of the album, which led to him becoming a full member of the band. Following delays in the opening of the new Co-op Live arena in Manchester, causing the cancellation of several performances by other artists, Elbow gave the first performance at the venue on the evening of the 14th May, following their support act The Waeve.

On 7 November 2024, Elbow released single "Adriana Again" as the first track of an upcoming EP for release in 2025, along with a music video featuring a mystery band. The band wanted to give the sound from Audio Vertigo "another crack", as Garvey put it.

On 24 February 2025 they announced a US/Canada tour. This marks the first North America shows since 2020 and the first proper North America tour since 2017.

On 9 May 2025 the band announced AUDIO VERTIGO ECHO elbow EP 5. Along with new single "Sober". The 4 track EP released on 6 June 2025 as a standalone EP as well as an extension to Audio Vertigo as its deluxe edition.

== Contributions and collaborations ==
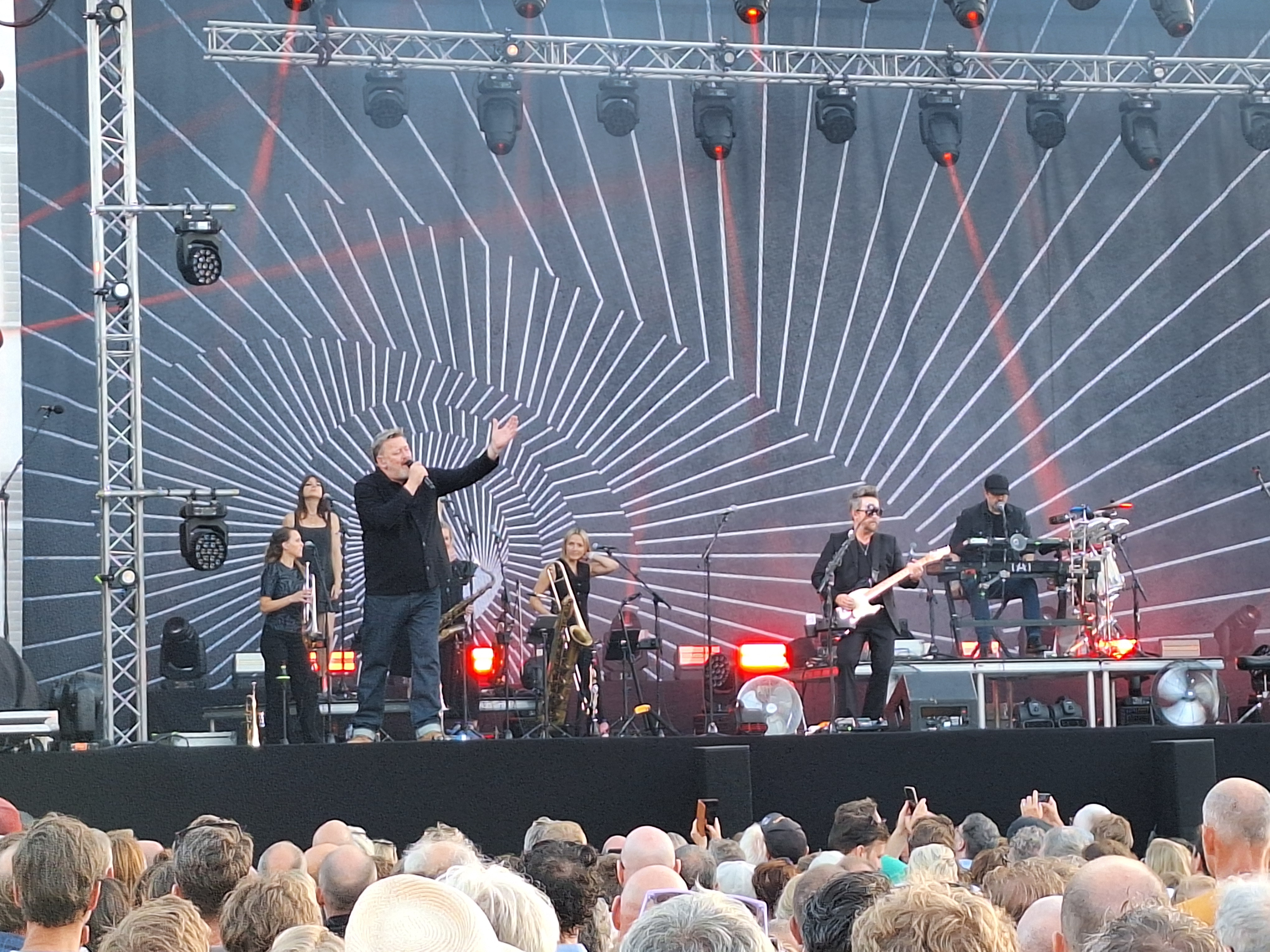
Elbow at Royal Park Live 2025

Elbow recorded an acoustic cover of Destiny's Child's "Independent Women" for a BBC Radio 1 session which was turned into a popular web animation by Joel Veitch, featuring a band of flat-capped northern kittens "performing" the song.

In January 2001, Elbow donated their unreleased original version of "Scattered Black and Whites" to Manchester Aid to Kosovo's compilation Cohesion.

The band released several songs for War Child compilations. In 2002 Elbow recorded a cover of "Something in the Air" for the compilation 1 Love. Elbow contributed the song "Snowball" to another compilation, Help!: A Day in the Life, in September 2005. The song was originally recorded for the Cast of Thousands record but omitted from the final album as the band felt it did not fit; the political lyrics suited the Warchild compilation. In 2009 Elbow contributed their cover of U2's "Running to Stand Still" to War Child Presents Heroes. Garvey explained: "When the band first met each other aged 17, Mark and Craig's father Gareth would lend us his Volvo to get our gear around. It seemed that for a year and a half all that we listened to in that car was Rattle and Hum. I remember the excitement every time a U2 album was released, we just loved them. The first song we ever covered together before we had enough of our own songs to do a performance was 'Running to Stand Still'. For 'Heroes' we've changed the order of things but kept every musical theme in the song. We wrote it with the members of U2 in mind. War Child do exactly what it says on the tin. These kids shouldn't be in such circumstances in the first place, but they are, so thank god someone's doing something about it".

A cover of "Working Class Hero" was recorded by the band as part of a John Lennon tribute album, Lennon: Covered Vol. 1, given away with Q Magazine in 2005. A The The cover of "August and September" was recorded as part of a tribute album Q Covered: Best of 86/06 in 2006.

In 2010, Peter Gabriel released a version of Elbow's song "Mirrorball" on his album Scratch My Back. In return, Elbow recorded a version of Gabriel's song "Mercy Street" from his 1986 album So, which appeared on the album of Gabriel cover versions And I'll Scratch Yours, released in 2013.

The song "Fallen Angel" appeared in the 2004 film 9 Songs, and the song "The Night Will Always Win" was used in the opening credits and title sequence of 2012's Call of Duty: Black Ops II.

Elbow created the song "What Time Do You Call This?" for the film Man Up, where it was featured in the end credits.

Elbow covered the song "Golden Slumbers" by The Beatles for the 2017 John Lewis Christmas commercial.

== Musical style and influences ==
Elbow's musical style has been described as alternative rock, indie rock, indie pop, Britpop, art rock, progressive rock, dream pop, post-rock, and post-Britpop. Elbow have cited a number of influences on their music, including Genesis (in particular the progressive rock years featuring Peter Gabriel and Steve Hackett), Talk Talk and Radiohead. Guy Garvey has said: "I grew up listening to every Genesis record. I learned to write harmonies by listening to Peter Gabriel."

The song "Newborn" from Elbow's debut album was directly influenced by "Entangled" from the Genesis album A Trick of the Tail. Garvey has also said "there'd be no Elbow without Radiohead". He credits the band's sense of dynamics to the influence of Talk Talk and has said: "Volume dynamics are an essential part of classical music, but a lost art with guitar music. I think it's incredibly boring and shortsighted if a band sticks with just one sound song for song. An album should take people on a journey."

== Band members ==
Current members

- Guy Garvey – lead vocals, guitar (1997–present)
- Craig Potter – keyboard, piano, backing vocals (1997–present)
- Mark Potter – guitar, backing vocals (1997–present)
- Pete Turner – bass guitar, backing vocals (1997–present)
- Alex Reeves – drums, percussion (2024–present; sessions and touring 2016–2024)

Former members

- Richard Jupp – drums, percussion (1997–2016)

== Discography ==
Studio albums

- Asleep in the Back (2001)
- Cast of Thousands (2003)
- Leaders of the Free World (2005)
- The Seldom Seen Kid (2008)
- Build a Rocket Boys! (2011)
- The Take Off and Landing of Everything (2014)
- Little Fictions (2017)
- Giants of All Sizes (2019)
- Flying Dream 1 (2021)
- Audio Vertigo (2024)

== Awards ==
- Mercury Music Prize – 2001 (nomination)
- Mercury Music Prize – 2008
- Brit Award – "Best British Group" – 2009
- Ivor Novello Awards – "Best Song Musically and Lyrically" ('One Day Like This') and "Best Contemporary Song" ('Grounds for Divorce') – 2009
- South Bank Show Award – "Pop" – 2009
- NME Award – "Outstanding Contribution to British Music" – 2009
- Mojo Magazine – "Song of the Year" – 2009
- Mercury Music Prize – 2011 (nomination)
- Brit Award – "Best British Group" – 2012 (nomination)
- Ivor Novello Award – "Best Song Musically and Lyrically": 'Magnificent (She Says)' – 2018

== Television appearances ==
Year	Show
2024	The Graham Norton Show
2019	The Graham Norton Show
2017	The Tonight Show Starring Jimmy Fallon
2017	The Last Leg
2017	The Graham Norton Show
2014	The Tonight Show Starring Jimmy Fallon
2011	The Album Chart Show
2011	Later with Jools Holland
2008	Later with Jools Holland
2008	Live from Abbey Road
2004	rage Guest Programmers http://www.abc.net.au/rage/guest/2004/elbow.htm
