= The Geordie Scene =

UK television show (1974–1976)

The Geordie Scene was a British television music series produced by Tyne Tees from 1974 to 1976. The programme showcased artists from the North East of England as well as nationally known groups.

In 2020, performances by a number of pub rock acts who featured on the show (including Dr Feelgood and Ace) was shown as part of Sky Arts' series, Guy Garvey: From The Vaults, produced by Wise Owl Films (part of Lime Pictures).
