= The Seldom Seen Kid =

2008 album by Elbow

Studio album by Elbow
- Released: 17 March 2008
- Recorded: 2006–2008
- Studios: Blueprint Studios, Manchester
- Genres: Alternative rock, art rock
- Length: 54:32
- Labels: Fiction; Polydor; Geffen
- Producers: Craig Potter, Elbow

Elbow chronology
Leaders of the Free World (2005)	The Seldom Seen Kid (2008)	Build a Rocket Boys! (2011)

Singles from The Seldom Seen Kid
- 1. "Grounds for Divorce" Released: 10 March 2008; 2. "One Day Like This" Released: 2 June 2008 (UK), 18 March 2008 (US); 3. "The Bones of You" Released: 29 September 2008

The Seldom Seen Kid is the fourth studio album by English rock band Elbow. It was released by Fiction Records on 17 March 2008 in the United Kingdom and was released by Geffen Records on 22 April 2008 in the United States. The album debuted at number five on the UK Albums Chart and won the Mercury Prize in 2008.

== Production ==
The album was recorded at Blueprint Studios in Manchester, and is the first Elbow album to be entirely self-produced, mixed and recorded without any outside help. The bulk of the record was written and performed by the band, aside from a guest appearance from singer-songwriter Richard Hawley, who contributes guest vocals, lead guitar and co-songwriting on "The Fix". The Seldom Seen Kid also incorporated dynamic range and made note of this in its packaging, by promoting Turn Me Up!^{[unfit]} in the album's packaging.

The title of the album is taken from one of the characters who appears in US author Damon Runyon's humorous, idiosyncratic tales of gangster life on New York's Broadway in the 1920s. In addition to appearing as a lyric within the album's first single, "Grounds for Divorce", The Seldom Seen Kid is also a nickname, given by Guy Garvey's father, to Bryan Glancy, a fellow Mancunian musician and friend of the band who died suddenly in 2006. The closing track, "Friend of Ours", as well as the liner notes of the album, are dedicated in his memory.

== Release ==
The album debuted at number five on the UK Albums Chart, the highest charting position of the band's career so far. The album was released in the UK in three versions: a regular CD in a super-jewel box, a digipak CD (both with one bonus track, "We're Away") and a double 12" vinyl LP.

The song "Grounds for Divorce" was featured in a TV ad for the video game Left 4 Dead. It is also featured in the trailer for the 2008 Coen Brothers film Burn After Reading. Samples of the song are also featured on the motoring series Top Gear. Furthermore, "Grounds For Divorce" has also been featured in a promo-ad for the 6th season of the hit TV-show House, as well as the Rescue Me season 5 episode Jump on 25 August 2009. It was also featured in the soundtrack for Colin McRae: Dirt 2. "Grounds For Divorce" was also a background track in the 2011 season finale of "In Plain Sight" on USA Network. The song also appears on the soundtrack for the video game Driver: San Francisco in 2011. In 2019 the song also appeared in the season 1 episode "No One's Gonna Harm You, Not While I'm Around" of The Morning Show, and is used as the closing song.

"Mirrorball" appears on Skins in 2009 on series 3 episode "Katie and Emily".

A version of the song "One Day Like This", without lyrics, was used as background and theming for the BBC's coverage of the 2008 Olympic Games. It was used in adverts for the film The Soloist, as well as an episode of Waterloo Road, and was included in The Official BBC Children in Need Medley.

On 17 January 2009, at Abbey Road Studios in London, the band played the album live with the BBC Concert Orchestra (conducted by Mike Dixon), featuring London choir Chantage. BBC Radio 2 broadcast the audio recording on Saturday 31 January, whilst the filmed event was made available on BBC interactive television via the red button.

The band released a special limited edition CD/DVD set of the performance, entitled The Seldom Seen Kid Live at Abbey Road, on 30 March 2009.

== Reception ==
Professional ratings
Aggregate scores
Source	Rating
Metacritic	82/100
Review scores
Source	Rating
AllMusic	4.5/5 stars
The A.V. Club	B+
The Guardian	4/5 stars
The Independent	4/5 stars
NME	9/10
Pitchfork	7.8/10
Q	4/5 stars
Spin	4/5 stars
The Times	4/5 stars
Uncut	4/5 stars

The album has received nearly unanimous praise from media outlets, including the NME and Planet Sound, which both gave Elbow their fourth consecutive 9/10 album rating.

The album won the Mercury Music Prize in 2008, an achievement which Guy Garvey declared to be "the best thing that's ever happened to us." The band were previously nominated for the award in 2001 with their debut album Asleep in the Back.

Commercially, the album was well received, opening at number five on the UK album charts, but faded away quickly. However, after the Mercury nomination the album saw a revival to gain gold status, with its second single "One Day Like This" re-entering the top 40 singles listing after the award win. The album had a steady chart run afterwards (including a re-entry in the top ten), enabling it to benefit from the busy Christmas market, and eventually reach over 300,000 sales, making it eligible for platinum status. It has since sold 860,000 as of September 2011.

In July 2011, The Seldom Seen Kid climbed from No. 103 back to No. 59 in the album's 159th charting week, making it having charted for more than 3 years there.

The band also won Best British Group at the 2009 Brit Awards and picked up two awards at the 2009 Ivor Novello Awards. "One Day Like This" won Best Song and "Grounds for Divorce" was Best Contemporary Song.

The album was also included in the book 1001 Albums You Must Hear Before You Die.

== Track listing ==
All tracks are written by Elbow, all lyrics by Guy Garvey, except where noted.

No.	Title	Length
1.	"Starlings"	5:05
2.	"The Bones of You" (contains elements of "Summertime" by George Gershwin, Dubose Heyward, Dorothy Heyward & Ira Gershwin)	4:49
3.	"Mirrorball"	5:50
4.	"Grounds for Divorce"	3:39
5.	"An Audience with the Pope"	4:27
6.	"Weather to Fly"	4:29
7.	"The Loneliness of a Tower Crane Driver"	5:14
8.	"The Fix" (Elbow, Richard Hawley)	4:27
9.	"Some Riot"	5:23
10.	"One Day Like This"	6:34
11.	"Friend of Ours"	4:38
12.	"We're Away" (UK bonus track)	1:59

- On the UK version of the album, there are 23 seconds of silence after "Friend of Ours" before "We're Away" begins, making its running time 5:01.

== Personnel ==
Elbow

- Guy Garvey – vocals, string and brass arrangements
- Mark Potter – guitars
- Craig Potter – keyboards, trumpet
- Pete Turner – bass
- Richard Jupp – drums

Additional musicians

- Richard Hawley – vocals, lead guitar on "The Fix"
- Ian Burdge – cello, backing vocals
- Prabjote Osahn – violin, backing vocals
- Stella Page – violin, viola, backing vocals
- Ben Parsons – cornet
- Nick Smart – cornet, flügelhorn
- Matt Ball – trombone
- Sheona White – E-flat horn
- Tim Barber – trumpet
- Elbow Choir – backing vocals
- Angela Thwaite – backing vocals
- Louise Turner – backing vocals

Production

- Craig Potter – production, mixing
- Danny Evans – additional engineering on "Grounds for Divorce" and "Friend of Ours"
- Danny McTague – additional engineering on "One Day Like This"
- Tim Young – mastering
- Mazen Murad – mastering on "We're Away"
- Oliver East – artwork
- Red Design – design

== Charts and certifications ==
=== Weekly charts ===
Chart (2008–2009)	Peak position
Belgian Albums (Ultratop Flanders)	7
Dutch Albums (Album Top 100)	39
French Albums (SNEP)	108
Irish Albums (IRMA)	9
Scottish Albums (Official Charts)	7
UK Albums (Official Charts)	5

=== Year-end charts ===
Chart (2008)	Position
UK Albums (OCC)	35
Chart (2009)	Position
Belgian Albums (Ultratop Flanders)	75
UK Albums (OCC)	32
Chart (2010)	Position
UK Albums (OCC)	161
Chart (2011)	Position
UK Albums (OCC)	134

=== Certifications ===
Region	Certification	Certified units/sales
United Kingdom (BPI)	3× Platinum	1,104,100

== Accolades ==
Publication	Country	Accolade	Year	Rank
Q	UK	50 Best Albums of the Year	2008	#8
WAN2	Hungary	20 Best Albums of the Year	2008	No. 20
The Fly	UK	Best Albums of 2008	2008	No. 1
NME	UK	Albums of the Year	2008	No. 17
OOR	The Netherlands	50 Best Albums of the Year	2008	No. 6

== Singles ==
- "Grounds for Divorce" (10 March 2008) [released and deleted in the same week] UK# 19
  - CD: b/w "Hotel Istanbul" – 7:01
  - 7" #1: b/w "Our Little Boat" – 2:58
  - 7" #2: b/w "A Regret" – 1:09
- "One Day Like This" (18 March 2008 – US; 2 June 2008 – UK) UK# 35
  - US: one-track digital download only
  - CD: b/w "Lullaby" – 3:13
  - 7" #1: b/w "Every Bit the Little Girl" – 4:32
  - 7" #2: b/w "Li'l Pissed Charmin' Tune" – 3:44
- "The Bones of You" (29 September 2008)
  - Promo CD: "The Bones of You" (radio edit) – 3:06
  - Digital download: b/w "The Bones of You" (Live at Manchester Academy) – 4:47

== The Seldom Seen Kid Live at Abbey Road ==
The Seldom Seen Kid Live at Abbey Road

Live album by Elbow
- Released: 30 March 2009
- Recorded: 17 January 2009
- Studio: Abbey Road Studios (London)
- Genre: Alternative rock
- Length: 59:11
- Label: Fiction/Polydor
- Producer: Elbow

Elbow chronology
The Seldom Seen Kid (2008)	The Seldom Seen Kid Live at Abbey Road (2009)	Build a Rocket, Boys! (2011)

The Seldom Seen Kid Live at Abbey Road was recorded live with the BBC Concert Orchestra at Abbey Road Studios on 17 January 2009. A special limited edition CD/DVD set was released by Fiction Records on 30 March 2009, featured inside a small box with individual card sleeves for each disc, as well as five postcards featuring photos of each band member, and a special booklet with photos commemorating the recording.

=== CD and DVD track listing ===
No.	Title	Length
1.	"Starlings"	6:30
2.	"The Bones of You"	5:12
3.	"Mirrorball"	5:53
4.	"Grounds for Divorce"	4:00
5.	"An Audience with the Pope"	4:25
6.	"Weather to Fly"	5:04
7.	"The Loneliness of a Tower Crane Driver"	5:26
8.	"The Fix" (Featuring Richard Hawley)	4:59
9.	"Some Riot"	5:58
10.	"One Day Like This"	6:38
11.	"Friend of Ours"	5:01
