= Grounds for Divorce (song) =

Single by Elbow

from the album The Seldom Seen Kid
- B-side: CD: "Hotel Istanbul"; 7": "A Regret", "Our Little Boat"
- Released: 10 March 2008
- Recorded: 2006–2007
- Genre: Alternative rock, blues rock
- Length: 3:41
- Label: Fiction
- Songwriters: Guy Garvey, Elbow
- Producers: Craig Potter, Elbow

Elbow singles chronology
"Leaders of the Free World" (2005)	"Grounds for Divorce" (2008)	"One Day Like This" (2008)

"Grounds for Divorce" is the first single from Elbow's fourth studio album The Seldom Seen Kid.

== Song ==
The song opens with the line:

I've been working on a cocktail, called grounds for divorce

Uncut magazine said it was "surely one of the best opening lines of any pop song in years" and NME compared it to something James Bond might say "this is kind of glorious one-liner he’d mutter before taking the bad guys down and then smooching a lofty Eastern European countess." The lyrics tell a story of excessive drinking in the local pub, ("There's a hole in my neighborhood / Down which of late I cannot help but fall") and an unhappy relationship ("And I’d bring you further roses, but it does you no good"). The word whoa is extended as "woah-oh-oh-oh" and repeated throughout the track.

Paste magazine writes: "The track explodes with their heaviest guitar line to date" and Digital Spy described the song as "Perhaps the loudest and most 'rocking' track in Elbow's career, the combination of infectious riffing and emotional wrangling makes this a call-to-arms that's both joyous and cathartic."

The music video was directed by Dan Sully.

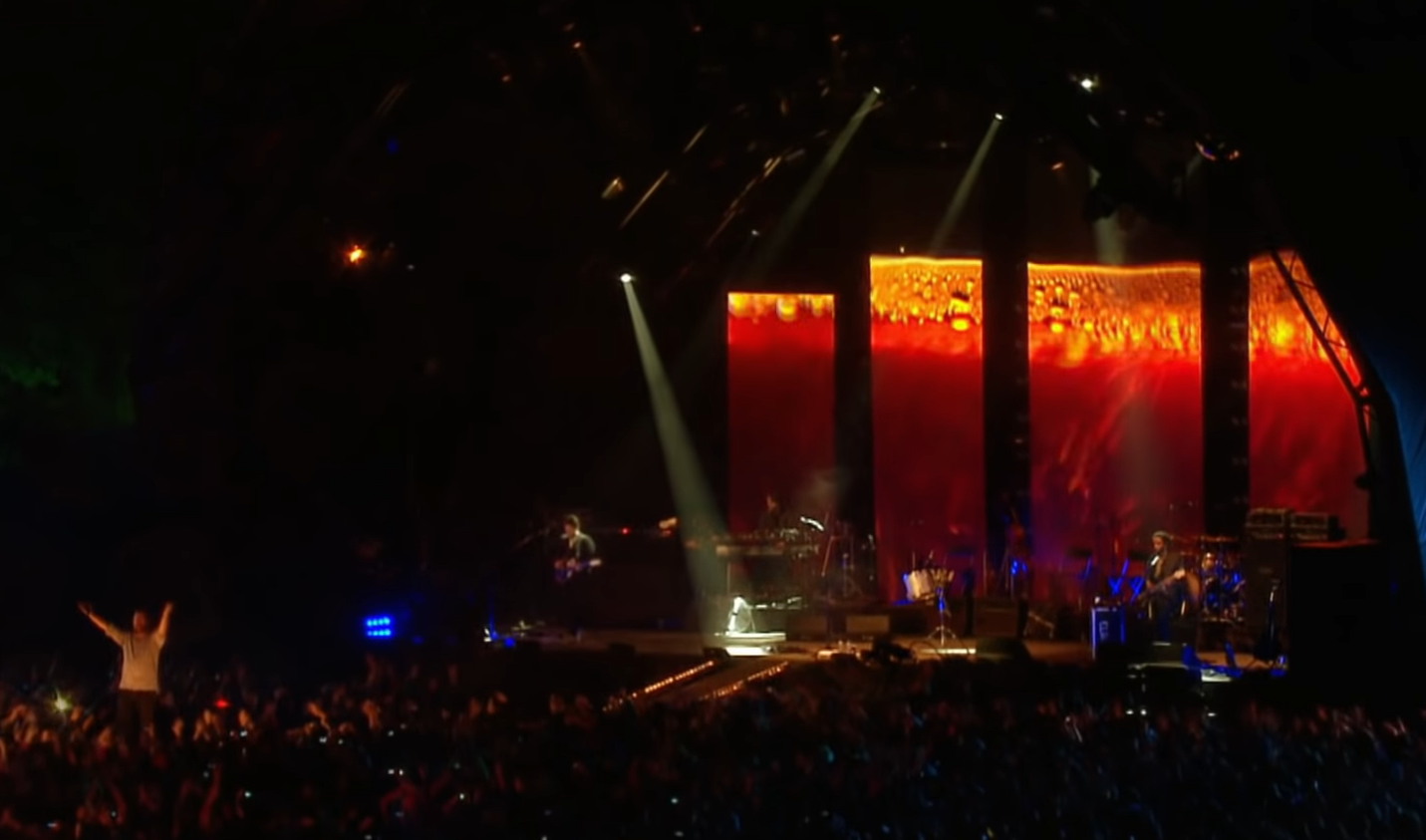
Elbow performing Grounds For Divorce

== Background ==
The single was released on 10 March 2008 as the band's first release on Fiction Records across two 7" vinyl records and one CD single. The song marked the band's joint-highest charting single at the time, peaking at No. 19 on the UK Singles Chart, becoming also their third UK Top 20 success and their sixth UK Top 40 entry. It was to be bettered four years later by their succeeding single "One Day Like This" - which was performed by the band in the closing ceremony of the 2012 Summer Olympics, peaking at No. 4 in August 2012. Frontman Guy Garvey told Uncut that "'Grounds for Divorce' was written when I was in an unhappy relationship." Garvey explained the song was about "that feeling of being sick and f***ing tired of everything around you and wanting to get out of there."

Guitarist Mark Potter said he had been playing the riff for years before using it in the song. "You know how most guitarists have something that they play every time they pick up a guitar? Well, that was my one. For 10 years the lads never seemed to notice it. I'd play it and look around the room expectantly and be like, 'Oh well, no reaction again.' Then about two years ago, I played it and Guy [Garvey, vocals] was like, 'What's that?' I said, 'What do you mean what's that? I've been playing it for 10 years!"

== Awards ==
On 21 May 2009, "Grounds for Divorce" won the Ivor Novello award for Best Contemporary Song.

== Promotion ==
"Grounds for Divorce" was featured in a TV advertisement for the video game Left 4 Dead. It is also featured in the trailer for the 2008 Coen Brothers film Burn After Reading. An instrumental version was also featured on Series 12, Episode 1 of the British motoring show Top Gear and was played at the opening montage which contained clips from the upcoming episodes, as well as in the third episode of the same series.

"Grounds for Divorce" was also featured in the eighth episode for the 5th season, and promos for the sixth season of the TV-show House MD. Also appeared in episode 521 of Rescue Me. It appeared in the soundtrack of DiRT 2, a rallying video game and was also used as the end credits song for an episode of Pete versus Life. In 2009, the riff was used on The Hairy Bikers' Food Tour of Britain TV show, whilst showcasing the professional chef opponent in the taste-off, as well as by The Apprentice contestant Chris Bates, in the final episode of series six in an advert for an alcoholic drink. The song is also on the soundtrack for a 2011 video game, Driver: San Francisco and also on the soundtrack for a 2015 video game, Guitar Hero Live.

In 2019 the song also appeared in the season 1 episode "No One's Gonna Harm You, Not While I'm Around" of The Morning Show, and is used as the closing song.

== Track listing ==
CD single

1. "Grounds for Divorce" – 3:40
2. "Hotel Istanbul" – 7:01

7" vinyl # 1

1. "Grounds for Divorce" – 3:41
2. "Our Little Boat" – 2:58

7" vinyl # 2

1. "Grounds for Divorce" – 3:41
2. "A Regret" – 1:09

== Personnel ==
- Guy Garvey – vocals, percussion
- Mark Potter – guitars, backing vocals
- Craig Potter – piano, synthesizer, percussion, backing vocals
- Pete Turner – bass, backing vocals
- Richard Jupp – drums, percussion, backing vocals
