= One Day Like This =

2008 single by Elbow

Single by Elbow

from the album The Seldom Seen Kid
- Released: 2 June 2008
- Length: 6:34 (album version); 3:45 (radio edit)
- Label: Fiction
- Songwriters: Guy Garvey; Elbow
- Producers: Craig Potter; Elbow

Elbow singles chronology
"Grounds for Divorce" (2008)	"One Day Like This" (2008)	"The Bones of You" (2008)

Music video
- "Elbow - One Day Like This (Official Video)" on YouTube

"One Day Like This" is the second single from English band Elbow's fourth studio album, The Seldom Seen Kid, released on 2 June 2008 on two 7-inch vinyl records and one CD single.

On 21 May 2009, the song won the Ivor Novello Award for Best Song Musically and Lyrically. In October 2011, NME placed it at number 41 on its list of "150 Best Tracks of the Past 15 Years". After featuring in the 2012 Summer Olympics Closing Ceremony, the single peaked at No. 4 in the United Kingdom—a new high for the song and for the band.

== Background ==
The song was a late addition to the album, after David Joseph of Universal Music requested a radio-friendly single. It took around two weeks to write and record.

The chorus lyric "one day like this a year would see me right" had been in singer Guy Garvey's diary for several years before the song was written. Speaking in 2014 about the song, Garvey said, "We put the chords behind it and realised it was going to be the hook of all hooks. I was like, 'what do we think?'... It was, 'it's kind of similar to "Hey Jude", isn't it?' I was like, 'yeah, and it's also similar to "Loaded" by Primal Scream, and we like both those songs, don't we?' So isn't it just generous to do that, isn't it a satisfying thing for the listener?... And my God, how it changed our fortunes."

The song was recorded at Blueprint Studios in Salford, and features string parts echoing the lyrics and throughout. These were recorded by just three musicians, with multiple takes using different instruments and in different positions in the room to give the impression of a much larger string section or orchestra.

== Chart performance ==
"One Day Like This" debuted at No. 39 in the UK Singles Chart on 8 June 2008, marking Elbow's seventh UK top-40 single. After 14 weeks, the single finally peaked at No. 35 on 14 September 2008. Due to the band's increasing popularity in the UK after winning their 2009 BRIT Award for Best British band, "One Day Like This" spent more weeks in the UK top 75 than any of Elbow's other singles with 31 weeks in five runs by the end of 2014, peaking at No. 4 in August 2012 following their appearance at the closing ceremony of the London Olympics. In July 2026, it was certified triple Platinum in the UK by the BPI. It also charted in the Flanders region of Belgium in July 2009, when it peaked at No. 19 on the region's Ultratop chart. It became the group's only single to reach the Top 30 of the Irish Singles Chart, reaching a peak of No. 18 after its inclusion in the closing ceremony of the London Olympics.

== Music video ==
The promotional video for the song was directed by Rigan Ledwidge. It features a man (David Lemke, an employee at the time of the guerilla marketing franchise AArrow Advertising) at a busy road junction, holding a red sign in the shape of a pointing arrow containing the words "Condos – Now Selling." As he stands at the junction, he turns the sign around many times, pointing it in all directions—symbolising a complete loss of direction in the best way possible—including flipping it in the air and spinning it on his head whilst motorists, pedestrians and skateboarders pass by.

== Track listings ==
CD single

No.	Title	Length
1.	"One Day Like This"	6:33
2.	"Lullaby"	3:13

7-inch vinyl 1

No.	Title	Length
1.	"One Day Like This"	6:34
2.	"Every Bit the Little Girl"	4:32

7-inch vinyl 2

No.	Title	Length
1.	"One Day Like This"	6:34
2.	"Li'l Pissed Charmin' Tune"	3:44

== Credits ==
- Producer – Craig Potter, Elbow
- Words By – Guy Garvey
- Written By – Elbow

== Charts ==
Chart (2008–2012)	Peak position
Belgium (Ultratop 50 Flanders)	19
Ireland (IRMA)	18
Scottish Singles Sales (Official Charts)	7
UK Singles (Official Charts)	4

=== Year-end charts ===
Chart (2008)	Position
UK Singles (OCC)	173

Chart (2009)	Position
UK Singles (OCC)	150

Chart (2011)	Position
UK Singles (OCC)	183

Chart (2012)	Position
UK Singles (OCC)	120

== Certifications ==
Region	Certification	Certified units/sales
United Kingdom (BPI)	3× Platinum	1,800,000^{‡}
^{‡} Sales+streaming figures based on certification alone.

== Cover versions ==
Snow Patrol covered "One Day Like This" on Jo Whiley's "Live Lounge on Tour", and was released as a limited edition b-side of "Crack the Shutters". An excerpt from the song is included in "The Official BBC Children in Need Medley", a charity single performed by Peter Kay's Animated All Star Band, released on 21 November 2009. The excerpt segues from "Hey Jude"—a similarity pointed out by Garvey. In 2023, Australian singer Gretta Ray covered the song for Amazon Music.

=== Sarah Brightman version ===
"One Day Like This"

Single by Sarah Brightman

from the album Dreamchaser
- Released: 15 April 2013
- Studio: Air Studios (London, England); Stratosphere Sound (New York, NY); Westlake Recording Studios (Los Angeles, CA)
- Genre: Pop
- Length: 5:57
- Songwriters: Guy Garvey; Elbow
- Producers: Mike Hedges; Sally Herbert

Sarah Brightman singles chronology
"Angel" (2012)	"One Day Like This" (2013)	"Sogni (feat. Vincent Niclo)" (2018)

"One Day Like This" was the second single from Sarah Brightman's eleventh studio album, Dreamchaser, released on 15 April (16 January in Japan), 2013, and produced by Mike Hedges and Sally Herbert.

==== Track listing ====
Digital download
No.	Title	Length
1.	"One Day Like This"	5:57
2.	"One Day Like This" (Radio Edit)	3:45

==== Music video ====
This music video starts with Brightman in her purple kimono setting her own tea for breakfast. She then dresses herself up in black and gold and has her hair tied in an updo and she puts on her space helmet for the rest.
