= Guy Garvey =

English musician, singer, songwriter and radio presenter

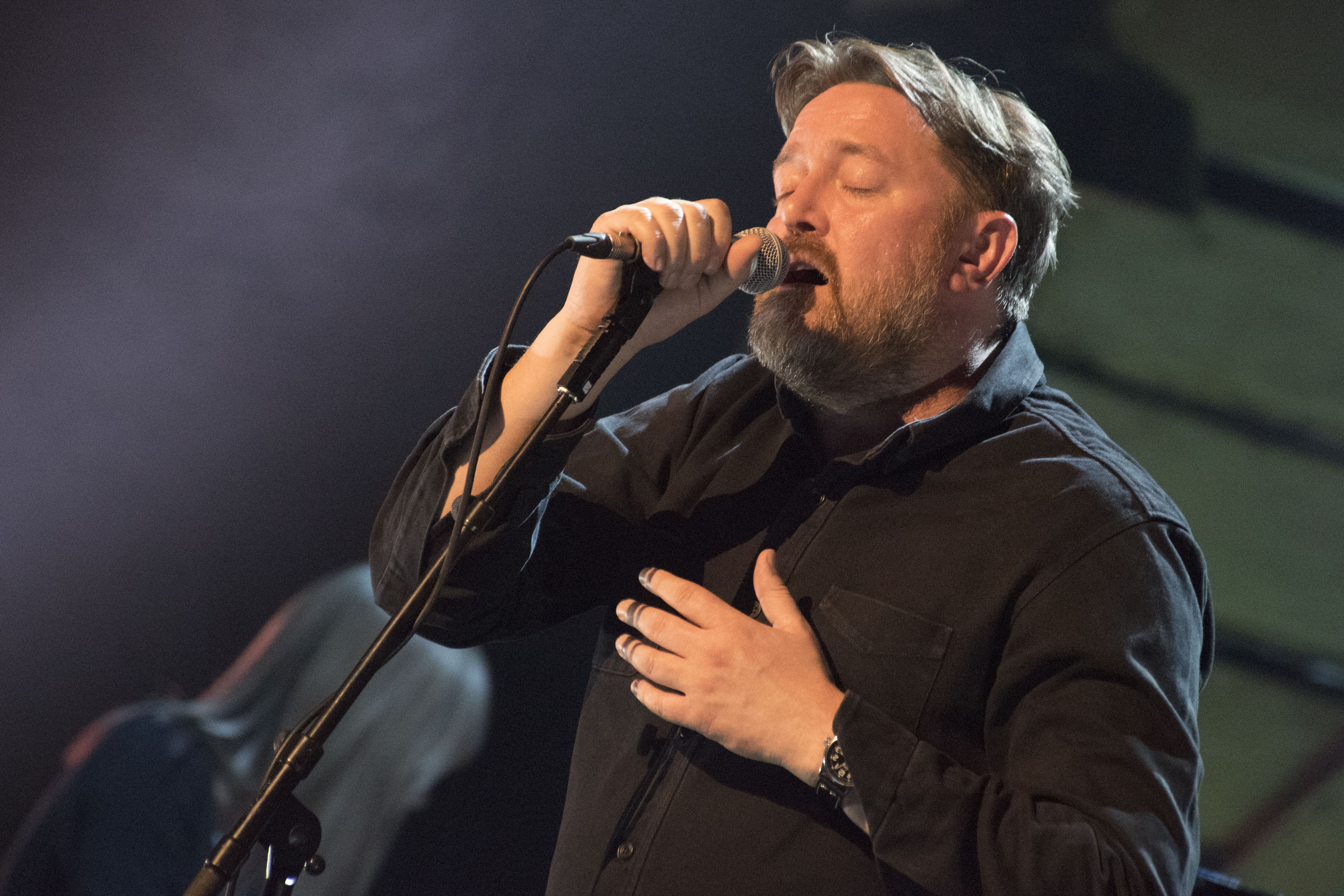
- Garvey at the BBC Radio 2 Folk Awards in 2015

Background information
- Born: Guy Edward John Patrick Garvey; 6 March 1974 (age 52); Bury, Lancashire, England
- Genres: Alternative rock; indie rock; art rock; post-Britpop
- Occupations: Musician; singer; songwriter; producer; arranger; radio broadcaster
- Instruments: Vocals; guitar; percussion; harmonica; keyboards
- Years active: 1990–present
- Member of: Elbow
- Website: elbow.co.uk

Guy Edward John Patrick Garvey (born 6 March 1974) is an English musician, singer, songwriter and radio presenter. He is the lead singer and lyricist of the rock band Elbow. He has a weekly show on BBC Radio 6 Music titled Guy Garvey's Finest Hour.

== Early life ==
Garvey grew up in Bury, Greater Manchester and comes from a working class, Catholic family. He is the sixth of seven siblings. He told The Guardian in 2015 that he was named Guy after another Catholic, Guy Fawkes. He also told them he was bullied at school, due to his ears, which he had pinned back at the age of 12. His sister Gina told The Guardian that the school bullying may have contributed to her brother's sensitivity. His parents separated when he was aged 12, and they had divorced by the time he was 13. His father was a former grammar school boy who could not afford to go to university; a trade unionist, he spent most of his working life as a newspaper proofreader and as a chemist at ICI. His mother was a police officer who went back to university and became a psychologist. Garvey has five older sisters: Gina, Louise, Sam, Karen, and Becky. His younger brother is the actor Marcus Garvey.

== Career ==
In the early 1990s, while at sixth-form college in Whitefield, near Bury, Garvey formed Elbow with Mark and Craig Potter, Pete Turner, and Richard Jupp. He serves as the lyricist of Elbow, and has been widely praised for his songwriting throughout his career. As well as vocal duties Garvey has also played a wide variety of instruments live including both electric and acoustic guitar, trumpet, and various forms of percussion. Elbow won two Ivor Novello awards for best song writing for the 2008 single "Grounds for Divorce" as well as best contemporary song for "One Day Like This". He was awarded a lifetime achievement honour by the Radio Academy in 2014. In the same year, he also featured on the re-launched Band Aid charity's single to raise funds for the 2014 Ebola crisis in Western Africa. Garvey, with Elbow, was commissioned by the BBC to write the theme song for the 2012 London Olympics, "First Steps" which the band performed at the closing ceremony.

Amongst other work, Garvey produced and recorded the I Am Kloot album Natural History (2001). Alongside Elbow keyboard player Craig Potter he also produced I Am Kloot's single "Maybe I Should" (2005, not associated with any album), their Mercury Music Prize nominated 2010 album Sky at Night and their 2013 album Let It All In. Elbow were themselves Mercury Music Prize nominees, in 2011, for the album Build a Rocket Boys! and won the prize in 2008 for their album The Seldom Seen Kid. In addition, Garvey made an appearance on Massive Attack's 2010 album record Heligoland.

He is a member of the British Academy of Songwriters, Composers and Authors (BASCA). In April 2012 Garvey became a patron of the Manchester Craft and Design Centre. In recognition of his outstanding contribution to music he received, in July of the same year, an honorary doctorate from Manchester Metropolitan University, a Doctor of Arts.

Garvey has been a presenter on BBC Radio 6 Music since 2007 (Sunday afternoon 1 pm to 4 pm, British time) and previously presented a show on Sunday evenings on XFM. He had a monthly column in the now-defunct listings magazine City Life and is a patron of the Mines Advisory Group (MAG), the Manchester-based charity responsible for clearing war zones of mines and munitions worldwide.

In 2014, he was a guest of Kirsty Young on Desert Island Discs and he chose Bushmills Irish whiskey and ice as his luxury item. His book choice was, The Collected Works of J.D. Salinger. His selected best disc was, Talk Talk's New Grass, Laughing Stock.

In 2015, Garvey presented Music Box, an iPlayer-exclusive series covering emerging and established bands. Garvey has also read several children's stories for the CBeebies "Bedtime Stories" programme on the BBC.

In 2015, Garvey announced that he would be releasing his first solo studio album while continuing his duties as Elbow's lead songwriter. The resulting album, Courting the Squall, was released on 30 October 2015, by Polydor Records in the UK. On 27 October 2015 Garvey appeared on BBC Two's Later... with Jools Holland, where he performed "Angela's Eyes" and "Belly of the Whale".

In April 2017, Garvey appeared in the BBC television sitcom Peter Kay's Car Share, playing Kayleigh's brother-in-law Steve.

In September 2018, Garvey appeared in the ITV television series The Bletchley Circle: San Francisco, as the bar singer in the Episode "Fog of War", singing "I Only Have Eyes for You".

In 2020, Garvey collaborated with Wise Owl Films (part of Lime Pictures) on the Sky Arts music series, Guy Garvey: From The Vaults, which features performances and interviews from a specific year in pop and rock history. Archive footage includes Channel 4's The Tube, Tiswas, Razzmatazz and Get It Together, as well as clips from regional programmes such as So It Goes, The London Weekend Show and The Geordie Scene. Many of the performances were previously unseen or being shown for the first time since they originally aired. The series began on 18 September 2020 and returned to Sky Arts for a fifth series in September 2024.

In January 2024, Elbow performed on The Graham Norton Show and afterwards Garvey joined Norton's guests to promote Elbow's tenth studio album, Audio Vertigo which was released on the 22 March. Their tour started on 4th May 2024 in Newcastle.

== Personal life ==
Garvey began dating DJ and presenter Edith Bowman in 2004, before later having a long-term relationship with writer Emma Jane Unsworth. He started dating actress Rachael Stirling in 2015 and the couple were married in June 2016 at Manchester Town Hall. The couple had their first child, a son, in 2017.

In a 2019 interview, Garvey identified Talk Talk's Spirit of Eden and Laughing Stock albums as his two favourite albums of all time, and also cited Björk's Vespertine, Joni Mitchell's For the Roses, and the work of I Am Kloot and Peter Gabriel as other favourites, among many others.

== Discography ==
=== With Elbow ===
- Asleep in the Back (2001)
- Cast of Thousands (2003)
- Leaders of the Free World (2005)
- The Seldom Seen Kid (2008)
- Build a Rocket Boys! (2011)
- The Take Off and Landing of Everything (2014)
- Little Fictions (2017)
- Giants of All Sizes (2019)
- Flying Dream 1 (2021)
- Audio Vertigo (2024)

=== Solo ===
- Courting the Squall (2015)
