= Pete Turner (musician) =

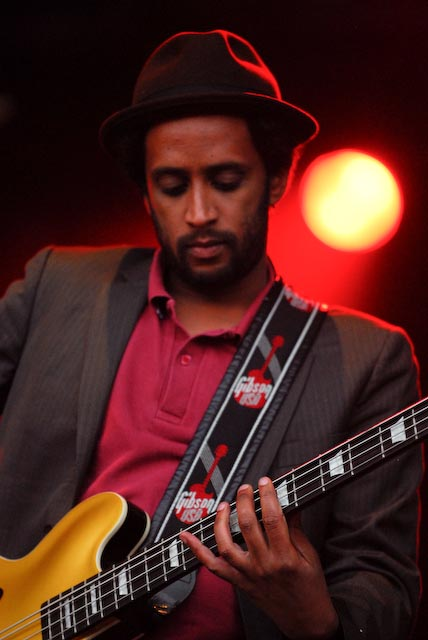
- Turner performing with Elbow at Connect 2008

Background information
- Born: Peter James Turner; 28 August 1974 (age 51)
- Origin: Bury, England
- Genres: Alternative rock; indie rock; art rock; progressive rock
- Years active: 1990–present

Peter James Turner (born 28 August 1974) is a British musician and songwriter who has been the bassist for the rock band Elbow since the group's formation.

== Biography ==
Turner grew up in Bury as an adopted child of white British parents. He has cited Adam and the Ants as the first band which he "really loved," and also cited Duran Duran and Public Enemy as early favourites. Turner has credited Duran Duran's John Taylor as being his initial inspiration in becoming a bassist. He has also said that Public Enemy's record Fear of a Black Planet is his favourite album.

Turner was one of the three embryonic founders of what would later become Elbow, as he had formed a band named RPM with future Elbow members Richard Jupp and Mark Potter. Turner befriended future Elbow frontman Guy Garvey at Bury College and the latter later joined RPM in 1991, triggering a band name change to Mr. Soft, and eventually later on first to just Soft and finally to Elbow in 1997.

Sometime in the 2000s, Turner relocated from Bury to Manchester's city centre, and then moved again to the suburban area of Chorlton in Manchester's southern half in 2008.
