= Gods and Monsters (I Am Kloot album) =

Studio album by I Am Kloot
- Released: 11 April 2005
- Genre: Indie rock
- Label: The Echo Label
- Producer: Joe Robinson

I Am Kloot chronology
I Am Kloot (2003)	Gods and Monsters (2005)	BBC Radio 1 John Peel Sessions (2006)

Professional ratings
Review scores
Source	Rating
BBC Collective	4.5/5 stars
Yahoo! Music	UK & Ireland
Allmusic	3/5 stars
The Press	3/5 stars
Pitchfork Media	6/10 stars

Gods and Monsters is the third album by English rock band I Am Kloot which was released on 11 April 2005. It reached No. 74 in the UK. As well as being released on vinyl and CD, the CD version of the album also appeared in a gate-fold sleeve edition with a second disc: a DVD titled Live At The Ritz + Videos which contained filmed live tracks from a gig, music videos, and a band interview.

== Overview ==
The semi-autobiographical lead single from this album "Over My Shoulder", about relationships ending, was featured occasionally on MTV. Lead singer Bramwell refers to the "Night and Day" club in Manchester where he used to work and where I Am Kloot got their first break. The track "Avenue of Hope" featured in the closing credits of the Danny Boyle film Sunshine in 2007. The cover art is by poster artist Jay Ryan.

== Album details ==
=== Track listing ===
1.	"No Direction Home"	2:34
2.	"Gods and Monsters"	2:04
3.	"Over My Shoulder"	2:57
4.	"An Ordinary Girl"	3:06
5.	"The Stars Look Familiar"	3:47
6.	"Strange Without You"	2:27
7.	"Astray"	1:41
8.	"Hong Kong Lullaby"	2:10
9.	"Sand and Glue"	4:06
10.	"Avenue of Hope"	4:42
11.	"Dead Men's Cigarettes"	2:50
12.	"Coincidence"	2:39
13.	"I Believe"	4:55

=== Music Credits ===
I Am Kloot

- John Bramwell
- Andy Hargreaves
- Peter Jobson

Additional instruments

- Robert Marsh – trumpet in "Avenue of Hope"
- Norman McLeod – pedal steel guitar in "Avenue of Hope" and "I Believe"

Production and mixing

- Joe Robinson – production and mixing
- Dan Broad – engineering

=== Album artwork ===
- Jay Ryan

== Disc II: Live At The Ritz + Videos DVD ==
The Live At The Ritz + Videos DVD was produced by film, multimedia, and transmedia artist Krishna Stott, later known for the award-winning interactive film projects Crimeface (2008) and Codename Winterhill (2015). Stott first worked with the band directing the music video to their single 'Life in a Day' (June 2003), the song taken from I Am Kloot's self-titled second album. Following the release of that album, Stott and camera operator Alex Perry traveled with the band on their late 2003 UK and European support tour filming sections of gigs, as well as filming the entire concert at The Ritz club in Manchester with a full crew. The intention was to use the filmed material in some way at a future date. More immediately, footage from both the Manchester concert and other gigs would be used by Stott to create the music video for the band's next single from I Am Kloot, 'From Your Favourite Sky'. Stott would also go on to direct a third music video from I Am Kloot, the single "Proof" (June 2004), featuring the actor Christopher Eccleston. As I Am Kloot were preparing the release of their third album Gods and Monsters in 2005, Stott was asked to produce the second disc using the live filmed material from the Ritz, include some of the band's music videos, and to specially film a band interview.

=== Live At The Ritz ===
A selection of live songs from a gig filmed on 12 October 2003 at The Ritz in Manchester by director Krishna Stott as a Retina Circus production. All the songs selected for the DVD come from their previous album I Am Kloot, the filming taking place very soon after its release. The rest of the filmed footage from the gig resides in the Retina Circus archive and is yet to be released.

1.	"A Strange Arrangement of Colour"	2:39
2.	"From Your Favourite Sky"	2:53
3.	"3 Feet Tall"	2:59
4.	"Not a Reasonable Man"	3:01
5.	"The Same Deep Water as Me"	4:17
6.	"Here for the World"	3:35
7.	"Proof"	2:28
8.	"Life in a Day"	3:10

==== Credits ====
Stage:

- Bob Sastry – horn in "The Same Deep Water as Me"
- Troupe (female dance group) – dance in "3 Feet Tall" and "Life in a Day"
- Richard Knowles – live sound
- Dave Morrisey – lighting

Filming:

- Krishna Stott (Retina Circus Productions) – directing and production
- Alex Perry, Jon Hillyer, Jared Roberts, Russell Moss, Jenna Collins, Philip Shotton, Wayne Simmonds – camerawork
- Scott Abrahams and Alex Perry – editing
- Julian Gaskell – live sound recording
- I Am Kloot and Julian Gaskell – audio mixing
- Krishna Stott and Julian Gaskell – mastering

=== Videos ===
9.	"Life in a Day"	2:51
10.	"3 Feet Tall"	3:07
11.	"From Your Favourite Sky"	2:49
12.	"Band Interview"	12:10

==== Credits ====
Music videos:

- "Life in a Day" – directed by Krishna Stott
- "From Your Favourite Sky" – directed by Krishna Stott
- "Three Feet Tall" – directed by Sam Brown

Interview:

- Krishna Stott – director
- Danny Moran – conducting
- Mark Kennard – heads illustration (same as visible on the artworks of singles "Titanic/To You" and "Twist/86 TV's")
- Jon Hillyer – camera
- Mark Schofield – sound
- Alex Perry and Krishna Stott – editing

== Singles ==
title	label	format, catalog number	release date	track listing	charts	additional informations
"Over My Shoulder"	The Echo Label	CDS, ECSCD160	21 March 2005	1. "Over My Shoulder"; 2. "Great Escape"; 3. "Junk Culture"; 4. "Over My Shoulder" (music video)	UK Singles Chart: 38	Artwork by Jay Ryan.
"Over My Shoulder"	The Echo Label	gramophone record 7", ECS160	21 March 2005	A. "Over My Shoulder"; B. "Junk Culture"	UK Singles Chart: 38	Artwork by Jay Ryan.
"Over My Shoulder"	The Echo Label	gramophone record 7", ECX160	21 March 2005	A. "Over My Shoulder (Live From the Half Moon Putney)"; B. "Stop Talking Photographs"	UK Singles Chart: 38	Artwork by Jay Ryan.
"Gods and Monsters (Two Lone Swordsmen)"	The Echo Label	gramophone record 12", ECDJ167 (promo), ECDLJ 167	18 April 2005	A. "Vocal Remix" – 4:40; B. "Fuzztrumental Mix" – 4:36		Remix and additional production by Two Lone Swordsmen; drums – Nick Burton; additional guitar – Chris Rotter.
"I Believe"	The Echo Label	download	13 June 2005	1. "I Believe"; 2. "Gods and Monsters – Two Lone Swordsmen Vocal Remix"; 3. "Gods and Monsters – Two Lone Swordsmen Fuzztrumental Mix"; 4. "Haunted House"		
