= BBC Radio 1 John Peel Sessions (I Am Kloot album) =

Compilation album by I Am Kloot
- Released: 30 October 2006
- Recorded: Maida Vale 4, London (18 July 2001 and 5 February 2004)
- Genre: indie rock
- Length: 34:19
- Label: Skinny Dog Records
- Producer: Simon Askew (1-6), Jerry Smith (7-11)

I Am Kloot chronology
Gods and Monsters (2005)	BBC Radio 1 John Peel Sessions (2006)	I Am Kloot Play Moolah Rouge (2007)

Professional ratings
Review scores
Source	Rating
soundmag.de	8/10 stars

BBC Radio 1 John Peel Sessions – a collection of I Am Kloot's sessions for John Peel. It was recorded over two sessions at Maida Vale 4: on 18 July 2001 (tracks 1–6) and 5 February 2004 (tracks 7–11; broadcast on 11 March 2004).

It showcases tracks from their first three albums, the song "Titanic" from their first single ("Titanic/To You", double A-side) and "This House Is Haunted", which was previously released as the B-side of the "Life in a Day" single. The song "Coincidence" is included here in the previously unbroadcast version, untitled at the time of recording.

The album was released on Skinny Dog Records, on 30 October 2006.

== Track listing ==
All songs written by John Harold Arnold Bramwell.

1.	"Storm Warning"	4:13
2.	"Twist"	3:29
3.	"Titanic"	3:27
4.	"86 TV's"	3:04
5.	"Stop"	4:23
6.	"From Your Favourite Sky"	3:10
7.	"Life in a Day"	2:52
8.	"This House Is Haunted"	3:12
9.	"Proof"	2:31
10.	"Strange Without You"	2:26
11.	"Untitled (Coincidence)"	1:30
