= B (I Am Kloot album) =

Compilation album by I Am Kloot
- Released: 16 September 2009
- Genre: Indie rock
- Length: 43:41 (CD1 UK); 53:25 (CD2 UK)
- Label: Skinny Dog Records

I Am Kloot chronology
I Am Kloot Play Moolah Rouge (2007)	B (2009)	Sky at Night (2010)

Professional ratings
Review scores
Source	Rating
Clash	7/10 stars

B is a compilation album of b-sides, rare recordings and unreleased material from English rock band I Am Kloot.

The album was first released at gigs starting on 16 September 2009, and was available on 15 October via Townsend Records. The official release date was 2 November 2009. The cover art consisted of fan-submitted artwork featuring the letter B.

== Track listing ==
The track listing for the album is as follows:

=== Disc 1 ===
1.	"Titanic"	3:12
2.	"Proof (demo)"	2:48
3.	"This House Is Haunted"	4:16
4.	"Cinders"	1:54
5.	"Deep Blue Sea"	3:55
6.	"The Mermen"	3:49
7.	"Gods and Monsters (Two Lone Swordsmen Remix)"	4:44
8.	"Strange Little Girl"	2:16
9.	"Junk Culture"	3:38
10.	"Stop Taking Photographs"	1:56
11.	"Big Tears"	2:25
12.	"Monkeys"	2:16
13.	"By Myself"	2:59
14.	"A Million Things (demo)"	3:33

=== Disc 2 ===
15.	"Blue and Bone China"	2:49
16.	"Asleep at the Wheel"	3:36
17.	"Fat Kids in Photographs"	2:39
18.	"Ferris Wheels (demo)"	3:40
19.	"Tell Me Something"	3:36
20.	"The Face of Alabaster"	6:04
21.	"You Gotta Go"	3:11
22.	"The Great Escape"	2:28
23.	"Glimmer"	4:58
24.	"Life in a Day (live)"	2:57
25.	"Over My Shoulder (demo)"	3:00
26.	"86 TV's (alternative version)"	3:05
27.	"Twist (French)"	3:20
28.	"Dogs Howl"	1:59/8:00
	the UK version includes a hidden track titled "Salomey Maloney" (lyrics by John Cooper Clarke; recited by Neil Bell)

=== Bonus tracks ===
Bonus tracks on the "European" 2xCD release and on the 2xLP release:

29 (CD2) / 15 (LP1).	"I'm a Believer"	5:24
30 (CD2) / 16 (LP1).	"The Red Dress"	4:24

=== Track origins ===
Track 1 originally released on "Titanic/To You" 7" single
Tracks 2, 27 originally released on "Morning Rain" single
Tracks 3, 4 originally released on "Life in a Day" CD single 1
Tracks 5, 13 originally released on "Life in a Day" CD single 2
Track 6 originally released on "Untitled #1" 7" single
Track 7 originally scheduled for release on "I Believe" single
Track 8 originally released on "Maybe I Should" single
Track 9, 10, 22 originally released on "Over My Shoulder" single
Track 11, 12 originally release on "3 Feet Tall" single
Tracks 14, 15, 16, 17, 19, 21, 23, 28 previously unreleased on any format
Track 18 original version appears on I Am Kloot Play Moolah Rouge
Track 20 released as free download from I Am Kloot website in Christmas 2008
Track 24 originally released on "From Your Favourite Sky" single
Track 25 originally released on We Love You, So Love Us Too compilation

Tracks 4, 9, 13, 15, 19 and 22 all pre-date I Am Kloot and were originally performed by singer John Bramwell under the name Johnny Dangerously.

== Personnel ==
- John Harold Arnold Bramwell – vocals, guitars.
- Peter Jobson – bass, slide guitar, backing vocals, piano, organ.
- Andy Hargreaves – drums, percussion, glockenspiel.
