= Live at The Trades =

Live album by John Bramwell
- Released: 25 January 2014
- Recorded: Hebden Bridge, The Trades Club, 29 June 2013
- Genre: Pop, acoustic music

John Bramwell chronology
You, Me and the Alarm Clock (1989)	Live at The Trades (2014)	Leave Alone the Empty Spaces / Live 2016 (2017)

Live at The Trades is a solo live album by John Bramwell. It was released on 25 January 2014 and made available only at Bramwell's live shows. At the end of April 2015, the album was released via Shedhead Records in the form of blue and black vinyl and a gatefold sleeve compact disc.

The recording consists of material recorded during Bramwell's concert at The Trades Club, Hebden Bridge, in June 2013. All the songs belong to I Am Kloot's repertoire.

The track "Fingerprints" is available as a free download after subscribing to the newsletter at www.johnbramwell.com.

== Track listing ==
1.	Intro
2.	"Northern Skies"
3.	"No Fear of Falling"
4.	"Fingerprints"
5.	"To the Brink"
6.	"Ferris Wheels"
7.	"Mouth on Me"
8.	"Masquerade"
9.	"Bigger Wheels"
10.	"Not a Reasonable Man"
11.	"I Still Do"
12.	"The Same Deep Water as Me"
13.	"Someone Like You"
14.	"Titanic"
15.	"Proof"
