= You, Me and the Alarm Clock =

EP by John Bramwell
- Released: 30 October 1989
- Recorded: Sugarloaf Studios in Abergavenny
- Genre: pop, acoustic music
- Length: 16:45
- Label: Village Records (catalogue no. VILT-110)

John Bramwell chronology
You, Me and the Alarm Clock (1989)	Live at The Trades (2014)

Singles from You, Me and the Alarm Clock
- 1. "Black and Blue/This Town and Mary" Released: 1987

You, Me and the Alarm Clock is a solo mini-LP by John Bramwell (I Am Kloot). The album was released in 1989 on Village Records label. Bramwell was almost 24 years old at that time and performed under pseudonym Johnny Dangerously.

The album was recorded and produced by John Bramwell at Sugarloaf Studios in Abergavenny (south-east Wales).

The record was pressed solely on 12-inch vinyl, and only a limited number of copies were available. After almost 23 years, on 7 May 2012, a limited re-mastered CD edition was released. This reediton was published by label Townsend Music (catalogue no. TOWNCD62) and debuted on its week of release at position 48 of the UK Indie Chart. The cover for the reissue contained the real name of John Bramwell instead of the pseudonym "Johnny Dangerously".

In autumn 2006, You, Me and the Alarm Clock appeared on the list of "The greatest albums you've never heard", published by The Guardian newspaper. The list consisted of twenty proposals submitted by the readers.

After You, Me and the Alarm Clock was released, in November 1989, John Bramwell toured England, giving concerts in Doncaster, Manchester, Macclesfield, Norwich, London, Bury and Cambridge.

== Track listing ==
A1.	"Junk Culture"	3:37
A2.	"Pierfront Arcade"	2:28
A3.	"You, Me and the Alarm Clock"	2:46
B1.	"Black and Blue"	2:08
B2.	"This Town and Mary"	2:42
B3.	"Tearing It Down"	2:41

== "Black and Blue / This Town and Mary" single ==
According to John Bramwell, his favourite song on this album is "Junk Culture". The stand out song for most of the listeners is "Black and Blue". Before You, Me and the Alarm Clock showed up, Bramwell released that song as a self-financed single. That single contained two tracks, "Black and Blue" and "This Town and Mary", released as a double A-side on 7-inch vinyl, and was published in 1987 (Small World Records, catalogue no. JDB1). Thanks to the airplay success of "Black and Blue", John Bramwell performed for the first time on the John Peel radio show and went on a small tour supporting John Cooper Clarke.

== The further history of individual songs ==
The song "Tearing It Down" was included on the B-side of "Introducing Jane" single (1990, Village Records, 12-inch vinyl, catalogue no. VILT-111), which was recorded by The deBuchias and John Bramwell.

In 2004, the song "Junk Culture" was re-recorded and included on some of I Am Kloot's releases:

- "Proof" single (2004),
- the B-sides of some of the versions of "Over My Shoulder" single (2005),
- B compilation (2009).

In 2011, "Black and Blue" appeared as the B-side of one of the versions of "Fingerprints" single by I Am Kloot.

== Personnel ==
- John Bramwell – producer
- Dave Price – engineer
- Tim Mulryan – sleeve
- Will Bradley – photography
