= Skinny Dog Records =

Skinny Dog Records is an independent record label based in Manchester, England, set up in 1999 by John Bramwell and Peter Jobson of I Am Kloot, Mark Potter of Elbow, Scott Alexander of Indigo Jones and media lawyer David Sefton. Potter and Alexander resigned from the company in 2003 and 2004 respectively.

The label was initially set up to release material by local acts such as Indigo Jones and Cranebuilders, but was later used to release material by I Am Kloot whilst the band were in between record deals. The compilation albums BBC Radio 1 John Peel Sessions, B and studio album I Am Kloot Play Moolah Rouge were released on the label, as well as the stand-alone single "Maybe I Should". The label also released material by artists including Gideon Conn, Jacki O and Superqueens amongst others.

Since I Am Kloot set up new label Shepherd Moon LLP with their then management company Wildlife Entertainment in 2010 to release their album Sky at Night, Skinny Dog Records appears to have been abandoned, with many of the label's roster no longer active.

== Roster ==
- I Am Kloot
- Gideon Conn
- Cranebuilders
- Indigo Jones
- Peter & The Wolf
- Moco
- Jackie O
- Black Basque
- Superqueens
