= Life in a Day (song) =

Single by I Am Kloot

Single by I Am Kloot

from the album I Am Kloot
- Released: 2003
- Genre: Indie rock
- Length: 8:56 & 9:41
- Label: The Echo Label
- Songwriter(s): John Bramwell
- Producer(s): Ian Broudie, Scott Alexander & Julian Gaskell, Chris Potter

I Am Kloot singles chronology
"Untitled #1" (2003)	"Life in a Day" (2003)	"3 Feet Tall" (2003)

"Life in a Day" was (until the release of "Over My Shoulder") I Am Kloot's highest charting single coming in at #43 in the UK singles chart in 2003. The second CD featured the music video for "Life in a Day" as well as 2 other B-sides.

== Release ==
"Life in a Day" first appeared on I Am Kloot's self-titled second album. Preceded by "Untitled #1" which was released in March 2003, the track was the second single from the album and released on 9 June 2003. It peaked at #45 in the UK singles chart.

== Music video ==
Life in a Day music video

The music video for "Life in a Day" was directed by film, multimedia, and transmedia artist Krishna Stott (Crimeface, Secret Story Network), and was the first of a number of collaborations between I Am Kloot and Stott.

City Life journalist Tim Birch described the video as 'a montage of cuts' that 'unfold' thus 'providing a non-story leading nowhere that strangely holds attention'. Composed of hundreds of fake security camera clips, Stott said of the project 'I like working with Kloot [...] they give me a lot of freedom visually'.

Stott went on to make the music video for I Am Kloot's single "Proof" (a nearly three minute long take of British actor Christopher Eccleston), and "From Your Favourite Sky", both from the same album. Both "Life in a Day" and "From Your Favourite Sky" videos are available on I Am Kloot's Gods and Monsters DVD (2005).

== Track listing ==
The single was released on three formats, two CDs and one 7" single. All songs written by John Harold Arnold Bramwell.

=== CD one ===
1. "Life in a Day" – 2:48
2. "This House Is Haunted" – 4:14
3. "Cinders" – 1:57

=== CD two ===
1. "Life in a Day" – 2:48
2. "Deep Blue Sea" – 3:54
3. "By Myself" – 2:59

=== 7 inch vinyl ===
1. "Life in a Day" – 2:48
2. "This House Is Haunted" – 4:14
