= From There to Here (disambiguation) =

From There to Here is a 2014 BBC One television series.

From There to Here may also refer to:

- From There to Here (soundtrack), by I Am Kloot for the BBC One television series
- From There to Here (Edmond Leung EP), 2015
- From There to Here: Greatest Hits, a greatest hits album by Lonestar, 2003
- From There to Here: 1989-2002, a compilation album by Brian McKnight, 2002
