= From There to Here (soundtrack) =

Soundtrack album by I Am Kloot
- Released: 24 November 2014
- Label: Kudos Records / Caroline Records

I Am Kloot chronology
| Let It All In (2013) | From There to Here (2014) | Hold Back the Night (2015) |

Professional ratings
Review scores
| Source | Rating |
|---|---|
| The Press | 3/5 stars |

From There to Here – a soundtrack album by British rock band I Am Kloot, written for the drama television series under the same title. The record was released on 24 November 2014 through Kudos Records/Caroline Records.

The material consists of 16 new instrumental tracks and three songs known from the previous discography of the band. For the first time I Am Kloot members worked as individuals on the same project, corresponding via emails. The bassist, Peter Jobson, has described this process as a "refreshing" experience after "fifteen years of recording all together in one room".

It was the second time when the screenwriter Peter Bowker decided to use music by I Am Kloot. The first was in the medical drama television series Monroe – which included three songs known from the previous studio albums by the band. The band's music was again featured prominently in Bowker's 2016 drama The A Word.

Except for the standard CD edition, a limited number of signed CDs and vinyls has been released. This was the band's final record before their dissolution in 2016.

== Track listing ==
Track lengths according to iTunes

| 1 | "From There to Here" | 1:43 |
| 2 | "Turning" | 0:46 |
| 3 | "The Same Deep Water as Me" | 4:08 |
| | – a song from the album I Am Kloot |
| 4 | "Blue" | 3:06 |
| 5 | "A Dream (Part 1)" | 2:41 |
| 6 | "Joanne and Daniel (Part 1)" | 3:55 |
| 7 | "Euro '96" | 4:18 |
| 8 | "Daniel Flashback" | 1:13 |
| 9 | "Daniel Stressed" | 1:18 |
| 10 | "The Bomb" | 2:18 |
| 11 | "A Dream (Part 2)" | 1:35 |
| 12 | "Even the Stars" | 4:09 |
| | – a song from the album Let It All In |
| 13 | "IRA Tribute Act" | 1:02 |
| 14 | "Heart Attack" | 3:31 |
| 15 | "Hospital Baby" | 0:25 |
| 16 | "Salford Refrain" | 0:51 |
| 17 | "Joanne and Daniel (Part 2)" | 1:26 |
| 18 | "Northern Skies" | 4:04 |
| | – a song from the album Sky at Night |
| 19 | "From There to Here (Reprise)" | 3:09 |
