= Let It All In =

Studio album by I Am Kloot
- Released: 21 January 2013
- Label: Shepherd Moon
- Producer: Guy Garvey and Craig Potter

I Am Kloot chronology
Sky at Night (2010)	Let It All In (2013)	From There to Here (2014)

Singles from Let It All In
- 1. "Hold Back the Night" Released: 5 November 2012; 2. "These Days Are Mine" Released: 14 January 2013; 3. "Some Better Day" Released: promo only

Professional ratings
Aggregate scores
Source	Rating
Metacritic	79/100
Review scores
Source	Rating
BBC Music	8/10 stars
The Guardian	4/5 stars
The Observer/The Guardian	3/5 stars
The Telegraph	4/5 stars
Impact	4/5 stars
Mojo	4/5 stars
The Fly	4/5 stars
Q	4/5 stars
The Press	4/5 stars
Uncut	8/10 stars
Drowned in Sound	8/10 stars
New Musical Express	7/10 stars
AllMusic	3.5/5 stars
The Independent	3/5 stars
Financial Times	3/5 stars

Let It All In is the sixth and final studio album by English rock band I Am Kloot. Like the previous one, this record was produced by Guy Garvey and Craig Potter of the band Elbow. It was released on 21 January 2013. On 27 January, the album debuted at #10 in the UK Albums Chart and at #1 in the Official Record Store Chart.

On 14 January 2013, the album began streaming for free on the guardian.co.uk website. Later, at an unknown time, the widget that provided the stream stopped working.

The first single promoting the album, "Hold Back the Night", had its radio premiere and a video premiere on 1 October 2012. However, the video clip "leaked out" a day early (on 30 September 2012).

The second single from the album is the song "These Days Are Mine". The music video for it was released on 26 November 2012. The single was released on 14 January 2013.

The video for "Some Better Day" features John Simm and was released on 8 February 2013.

Before the release of Let Them All In, I Am Kloot asked a British poet, Simon Armitage, to write a few words about this album. Those liner notes are only to be found on the LP edition.

== "Bullets" ==
In the opening track ("Bullets") John Bramwell sings with a slight lisp. It's the result of an accident that occurred during the time the album was recorded and in which the singer lost some of his lower teeth. In some interviews, Bramwell says that it was a speed-boating accident somewhere in Southern France, while in others he calls this version of events a myth.

== Track listing ==
The track listing for the album is as follows:

1.	"Bullets"	3:28
2.	"Let Them All In"	4:03
3.	"Hold Back the Night"	4:39
4.	"Mouth on Me"	2:54
5.	"Shoeless"	2:55
6.	"Even the Stars"	4:09
	a new version of "Even the Stars" from the DVD I Am Kloot Play Moolah Rouge
7.	"Masquerade"	2:20
8.	"Some Better Day"	2:53
9.	"These Days Are Mine"	5:41
10.	"Forgive Me These Reminders"	4:36

The Japanese edition of Let It All In includes two additional tracks (#11, #12): "Too Late" and "To Send My Love to You (demo)". Both were also published as b-sides of the singles from this album (see below).

== Singles ==
title	label	format, catalog number	release date	track listing	additional informations
"Hold Back the Night"	Shepherd Moon/[PIAS] Recordings	download	5 November 2012	1. "Hold Back the Night" 4:39; 2. "To Send My Love to You (demo)" 2:51	
"Hold Back the Night"	Shepherd Moon	gramophone record 7", SM0022	12 November 2012	1. "Hold Back the Night" 4:39; 2. "To Send My Love to You (demo)" 2:51	Limited edition of 500 copies.
"These Days Are Mine"	Shepherd Moon	download	11 January 2013	1. "These Days Are Mine (radio edit)" 3:25; 2. "Too Late" 3:43	
"These Days Are Mine"	Shepherd Moon	gramophone record 7", SM0032	14 January 2013	1. "These Days Are Mine (radio edit)" 3:25; 2. "Too Late" 3:43	Limited edition.
"These Days Are Mine (Dave Clarke remix)"	[PIAS] Recordings	download, PIASR339DS2	14 January 2013	"These Days Are Mine (Dave Clarke remix)" 7:01	
