= From Your Favourite Sky =

Single by I Am Kloot

Single by I Am Kloot

from the album I Am Kloot
- Released: March 2004
- Genre: Indie rock
- Label: The Echo Label
- Songwriter(s): John Bramwell
- Producer(s): Ian Broudie, Scott Alexander & Julian Gaskell, Chris Potter

I Am Kloot singles chronology
"3 Feet Tall" (2003)	"From Your Favourite Sky" (2004)	"Proof" (2004)

"From Your Favourite Sky" is I Am Kloot's first single of 2004, released in March of that year. It was promoted by a video using filmed footage taken from their UK and European tour at the end of the previous year. X-Ray Magazine said of the song, that the 'Manchester trio' restore 'faith in songwriting', with 'Johnny Bramwell's fabulous voice ... the key to a lot of this magic,' his 'tongue-twisting around the easy-going "From Your Favourite Sky" ... is captivating and soothing'. Natasha Perry at Contact Music wrote: "There's a definite classical and flamenco tinge to it, bizarre given there's not a classical instrument in there. The lyrics are great... I guarantee you that I Am Kloot will find a way into your heart'.

== Release ==
"From Your Favourite Sky" first appeared on I Am Kloot's self-titled second album. Preceded by "3 Feet Tall" which was released in September 2003, the track was the fourth single from the album and released in March 2004. Despite the success of the two previous singles from the album, this track failed to enter the UK singles chart.

== Music video ==
From Your Favourite Sky video

The music video for "From Your Favourite Sky" was directed by Krishna Stott, who had already made the music video for the band's previous single, "Life in a Day", and went on to make the music video for their next single "Proof" (a nearly three minute long take of British actor Christopher Eccleston).

Following the release of the album, Stott and camera operator Alex Perry traveled with the band on their late 2003 UK and European support tour filming sections of gigs, as well as filming the entire concert at The Ritz club in Manchester with a full crew. The intention was to use the filmed material in some way at a future date. More immediately, footage from both the Manchester concert and other gigs was used by Stott to create the music video for this single. The images filmed live were manipulated in post-production by Stott creating an unusual and intimate profile of the band. Both "Life in a Day" and "From Your Favourite Sky" videos are available on I Am Kloot's Gods and Monsters second disc DVD (2005).

== Track listing ==
The single was released on two formats, download and two CDs. All songs written by John Harold Arnold Bramwell.

=== Download ===
1. "From Your Favourite Sky"
2. "Life in a Day (Live)"
3. "Not a Reasonable Man (Live)"
4. "From Your Favourite Sky (Live)"

=== CD 1 ===
1. "From Your Favourite Sky"
2. "This House Is Haunted"
3. "Cinders"
4. "Deep Blue Sea"
5. "By Myself"

=== CD 2 ===
1. "From Your Favourite Sky"
2. "Life in a Day (Live)"
3. "Not a Reasonable Man (Live)"
4. "From Your Favourite Sky (Live)"
5. "From Your Favourite Sky" (music video)
