= Dave Clarke (DJ) =

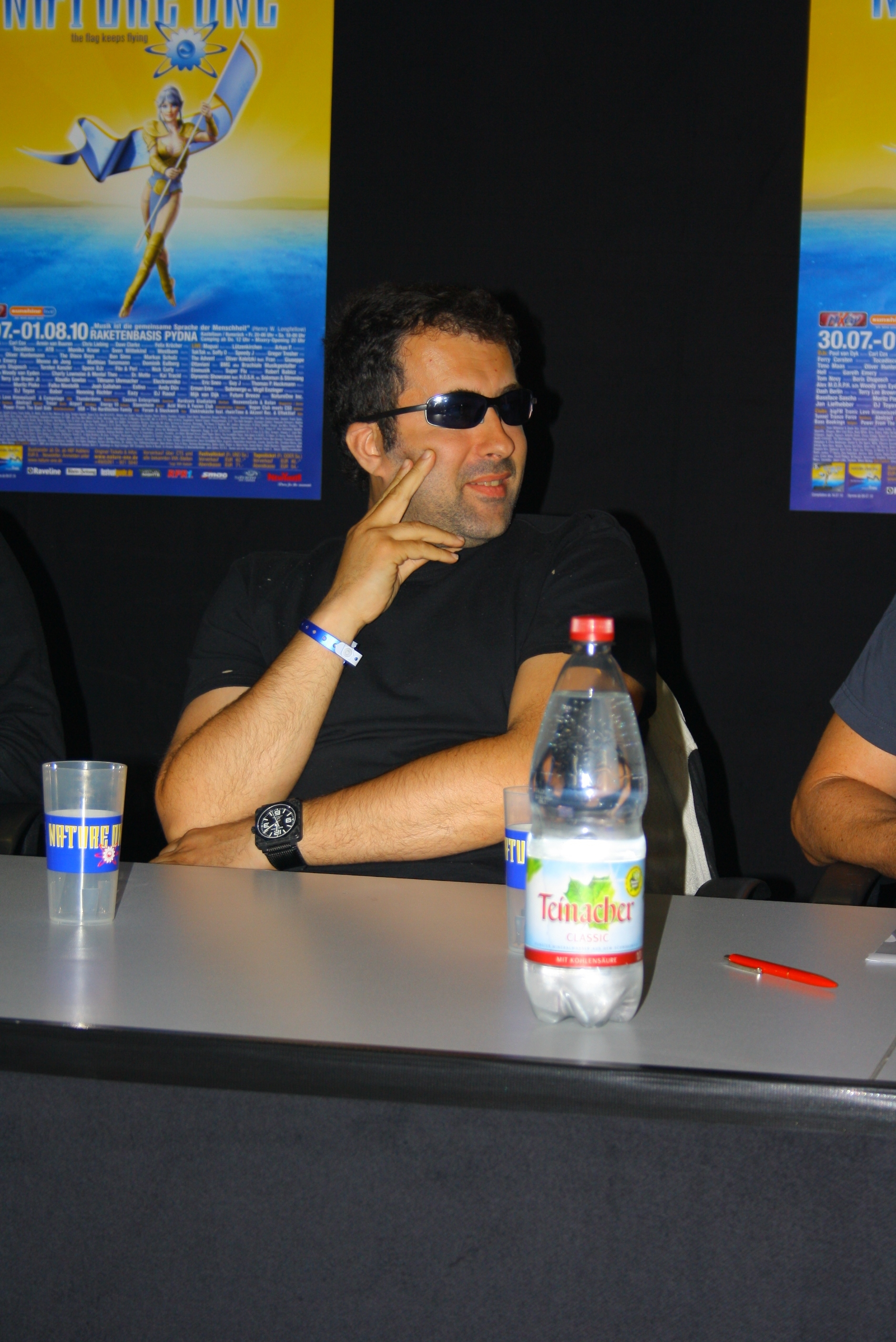
- Dave Clarke in 2010

Background information
- Also known as: The Baron of Techno, Hardcore, Directional Force, Mister Technology
- Born: David Maurice Clarke; September 19, 1968 (age 57); Brighton, East Sussex, England
- Origin: London, England
- Genres: Techno, electronic, house
- Occupations: DJ, producer, radio presenter
- Years active: 1990–present
- Labels: Deconstruction Records, Skint Records
- Website: daveclarke.com

David Maurice Clarke (born 19 September 1968) is an English electronic dance music DJ, producer and radio presenter. BBC radio presenter John Peel named Clarke "The Baron of Techno".

== Early life ==
Born in Brighton, East Sussex, England, Clarke was educated at Brighton College, but moved out of home at the age of 16 after his parents separated.

Since the age of 8, Clarke has been interested in music and technology, and to him, "there was no alternative but to go professional."

After a brief period of homelessness, a friend offered him temporary accommodation and Clarke continued to develop his love for music — initially hip hop and post-punk. The Damned was an early influence for Clarke and he continues to listen to the band during his music career:

I bought my first Damned album because I thought they sounded like they'd be really evil ... and even now their album Machine Gun Etiquette is one I keep coming back to. I like the attitude, the free rein of it, and on an artistic level I see my music as in the alternative genre rather than dance music. Techno and electro is an alternative that happens to be on the peripheries of dance music.

During this period, his employment included a low-paying job in a shoe shop; however, his musical ambitions were established at this stage of his life: "I used to tell people when I was working in a shoe shop that I would one day travel the world based on a career in music ... I was that driven." Musical success began when he attained a DJ residency at the Brighton nightclub Toppers, which rivalled a club night run by John Digweed (then known as DJ JD). Clarke later explained that he regarded the period "as an apprenticeship".

Clarke's music reviews were also published in the now-defunct DMC Update magazine and he reviewed the first single by Aphex Twin. Clarke acknowledged in 2013, "having my reviews in there [DMC Update] helped me to get the vinyls I needed to be out there DJing."

== Musical career ==
Clarke's musical career commenced as a producer and his first release was under the moniker "Hardcore" on the XL Recordings label in 1990. The release occurred two years after he played his first international show at the now-defunct "Richters" venue in Amsterdam, the Netherlands. The XL release gained the attention of Belgian techno music label R&S Records and he subsequently released various EPs in 1991 as both Hardcore and "Directional Force".

In 1992 Clarke launched his own music label, "Magnetic North", releasing recordings under the moniker "Fly By Wire". He then produced a series of EPs under the name "Red", one of which was listed by the DJ Mag publication in its "All Time Techno Top 100" list. The Red recordings led to a significant level of attention for Clarke, who subsequently produced remixes for prominent artists such as Kevin Saunderson's "Inner City", The Chemical Brothers, New Order and Underworld.

Signed to the de-Construction label, Clarke then released his debut album, Archive One, in 1996, which contained elements of the breakbeat and electronica genres. Clarke is one of the few DJs who performed live on Peel's radio show and segments of the performance were released as The John Peel Session EP on the Strange Fruit label in 1997, under the name "Directional Force". Also in 1997, Peel identified Archive 1 as number 14 in a list of his top 20 albums at the time.

Clarke then released a series of DJ mix albums, including two World Service sets, released on the React Records label at the beginning of the 21st century. One of the albums sold over 100,000 copies, while World Service Vol. 1 was ranked number 9 in the Resident Advisor (RA) magazine poll of best mix albums from the 2000–2009 period. In response to the RA ranking, Clarke stated:

There was a general frustration for me at the time that I started putting World Service together that there was so much good electro and techno coming out at the time, and I didn't want to do just one specific genre on a mix. I wanted it to be a continuation of my radio show—similar to the BBC's World Service—available to everyone around the globe. While I think I prefer the electro mix from World Service 2, there are so many great tracks on the first.

The album Devil's Advocate, released in 2004, was Clarke's output during a brief period with the Skint music label and featured collaborations with Chicks on Speed, Mr Lif and DJ Rush. In 2006 Clarke launched his weekly radio program, "White Noise", on Dutch radio broadcaster VPRO (3FM).

Clarke relocated to Amsterdam in 2008, explaining in 2013 that he "just couldn't grow there [England] anymore." Following Clarke's performance at Richter in the 1980s, he states that he "fell in love with the place and hoped one day to live" in the city. Clarke commended Amsterdam in 2013, as it "has so many great things, an amazing way of life in the most beautiful setting with a bloody great big and reliable airport 15 mins away."

In 2011 Clarke started a new project called "_Unsubscribe_" with Jonas Uittenbosch (a.k.a. Mr. Jones), after they met in Utrecht, the Netherlands. They have remixed artists such as Ben Sims, Detroit Grand Pubahs and Boys Noize. In May 2013 their debut single, "Spek Hondje", appeared on the Houndstooth label—prior to this, Clarke had not recorded in a studio for six years.

Since relocating to Amsterdam, Clarke founded the "Dave Clarke Presents" event moniker that, as of 2013, appeared on eight sold-out occasions at the annual Amsterdam dance event (ADE) and hosted the second-biggest outdoor stage at the Tomorrowland 2012 festival in Belgium; Dave Clarke Presents returned for Tomorrowland 2013. Clarke has also appeared at other prominent festival events, such as Awakenings, Glastonbury, Pukkelpop and Nature One.

As of 2013, Clarke's DJ presence at clubs includes Fabric in London, UK, Berghain in Berlin, Germany, and Fuse in Brussels, Belgium. In a 2013 interview, Clarke explained that Fabric and the "celtic side" (Ireland and Scotland) were solely responsible for quality electronica in the UK region:

But yes, the scene is cheesy in the UK, why do I think this...well I blame one person: Pete Tong, the driver of big business into UK radio. That is my interpretation anyway. Also the sad demise of record shops didn't help sustain a healthy disdain to the commerciality so omnipresent in the UK. Yes, Fabric kicks the crap away with an amazing stance for quality week in week out, but you mostly have to go to the celtic side to get back the punky attitude, Scotland, Ireland...

Clarke performed at the Smart Bar in Chicago, United States (US) in November 2013, which was his first American live show in around eight years. Clarke explained in a promotional interview that "shiesty promoters not being professional and honouring legal commitments" were responsible for his protracted absence. In the same interview, Clarke also provided his perspective on US electronica:

That is strange for me, the US invents house and electro, digests European electronica and comes up with Techno, yet never understands the culture it gave Europe and the World and doesn't treat these innovators with any deep respect or understanding above cult status, that is a dilemma I cannot fathom.

As of 11 July 2021, 810 editions of "White Noise" have been broadcast and the program has moved from VPRO (3FM) to the Irish station RTÉ 2fm. Clarke explained in 2013 that the radio show "really is my way of paying back the scene."

In November 2021 Clarke started his non-techno radio show to explore his complete musical palette: "The Saga Series" on RTE 2FM and as a podcast. It features music from Brian Jonestown Massacre and Idles, original UK punk and new wave to gothic favourites Bauhaus.

Clarke was featured in the April 2014 edition of Mixmag magazine, in which he states: "EDM is a vehicle for ego-centric artists to expand their wallets". In 2014 Clarke will curate a stage at Belgium's Tomorrowland event for the third consecutive year and explained in a June 2014 interview with American magazine Big Shot: "In Belgium they always had an understanding and respect for underground music. I have been playing there for over 20 years so I think in their hearts they love having a bit of punk spirit on a very successful EDM festival, for me it is an honor to be entrusted in doing an alternative stage." When asked for his final thoughts in the Big Shot interview, Clarke stated: "An American mag asking me questions whilst I am not and never have been part of EDM has to be an honor."

=== DJ equipment ===
Clarke has not played vinyl in clubs since the end of the 2004, and instead played digital files on CD (his players of choice were the Technics DZ1210). In mid-2006, he then used the Technics DZ1210 in conjunction with Serato Scratch Live—with an SL3 converter—but also uses Pioneer CDJs or Denon CD DJ players (DJ SC2900), the latter of which he helped develop. For fast & easy navigation on Serato he is using a SpaceNavigator.

Clarke explained in June 2014 that he never prepares his DJ sets, which he explained was considered "weird" by others. Clarke explained:

I like to be on my toes and be instinctual and “live,” so I will deal with each gig as it comes. Of course some are more “pressured” than others, but as an artist you feed off that.

== Personal life ==
In 2013 Clarke explained that his experience as a professional DJ was a combination of "ups and downs":

... the travelling is tough, the lack of sleep is a killer (3–4 hours over 2–3 days), giving up your weekends for 25 years needs understanding from friends and family, being dead tired on a Tuesday is really a bummer, being in cars for hours on end when you want/need to sleep can drive you mad, being in a club when people really get you and all is syncopated is pure magic ...

== Selected discography ==
=== Albums ===
- Archive One (1996) – UK No. 36
- Devil's Advocate (2003)
- Remixes & Rarities (2006)
- Charcoal Eyes (A Selection of Remixes from Amsterdam) (2016)
- The Desecration of Desire (2017)

=== Singles and EPs ===
- "Red 1" (1994)
- "Red 2" (1994)
- "Red Three : Thunder / Storm" (1995)
- "Southside" (1996)
- "No One's Driving" (1996)
- "Shake Your Booty" (1997)
- "Before I Was So Rudely Interrupted" (2000)
- "The Compass" (2001)
- "The Wolf" (2002)
- "Way of Life" (2003)
- "The Wiggle" (2004)
- "Just Ride" (2004)
- "What Was Her Name?" (2004)
- "Blue on Blue" (2004)
- "Dirtbox" (2005)
- "The Wolf/Way of Life" (remixes) (2017)
- "Charcoal Eyes (Glass Tears)" featuring Mark Lanegan (2017)
- "I'm Not Afraid" featuring Anika (2017)

=== DJ mix compilations ===
- Dave Clarke Presents X-Mix – Electro Boogie (1996)
- Muzik Masters (1996)
- Dave Clarke Presents Electro Boogie Vol. 2 – The Throwdown (1998)
- Fuse Presents Dave Clarke (1999)
- World Service (2001)
- World Service 2 (2005)
- I ♥ Techno (2007)
- Back in the Box (2008)
- Fabric 60 (2011)

=== Selected remixes ===
- Aphrohead a.k.a. Felix Da Housecat – ("In the Dark We Live") (1994)
- Death in Vegas – ("Rocco") (1996)
- The Chemical Brothers – ("Chemical Beats") (1996)
- Depeche Mode – ("Dream On")
- Midfield General – ("Coatnoise") (2000)
- Fischerspooner – ("Emerge") (2001)
- Chicks on Speed – ("Wordy Rappinghood") (2003)
- I Am Kloot – ("These Days Are Mine") (2013)
- Marcel Fengler – ("Sky Pushing") (2014)

=== UK charting singles ===
Year	Single	Peak chart positions UK
1995	"Red Three : Thunder / Storm"	45
1996	"Southside"	34
1996	"No One's Driving"	37
2001	"The Compass"	46
2002	"The Wolf"	66
2003	"Way of Life"	59
2004	"What Was Her Name?" feat. Chicks on Speed	50
