= I Am Kloot Play Moolah Rouge =

Studio album by I Am Kloot
- Released: 24 November 2007
- Genre: Indie rock
- Length: 34:20
- Label: Skinny Dog Records
- Producer: The McLeod Brothers (Colin & Norman McLeod) and I Am Kloot

I Am Kloot chronology
BBC Radio 1 John Peel Sessions (2006)	I Am Kloot Play Moolah Rouge (2007)	B (2009)

Professional ratings
Review scores
Source	Rating
The Independent	3/5 stars
London Evening Standard	4/5 stars
Teraz Rock	4/5 stars

I Am Kloot Play Moolah Rouge is the fourth studio album by English rock band I Am Kloot. A limited-edition version of 2000 copies was on sale to the public attending their show at Manchester Academy 3 on 24 November 2007, and the following dates on their mini-tour of England and Europe. The album was commercially released on 14 April 2008.

== Track listing ==
=== CD ===
1.	"One Man Brawl"	3:20
2.	"Chaperoned"	5:08
3.	"Ferris Wheels"	3:11
4.	"Hey Little Bird"	2:47
5.	"The Runaways"	3:09
6.	"Down at the Front"	3:56
7.	"Someone Like You"	3:08
8.	"Suddenly Strange"	2:59
9.	"Only Role in Town"	4:39
10.	"At the Sea"	2:02

All songs written by John Bramwell.

=== DVD ===
Includes an interview with John Bramwell (the conversation is illustrated with fragments of I Am Kloot concerts) and fragments of a special live performance, recorded in Moolah Rouge Studios:

1.	"Ferris Wheels"	3:04
2.	"One Man Brawl"	3:31
3.	"Hey Little Bird"	2:48
4.	"Someone Like You"	3:10
5.	"Suddenly Strange"	3:00
6.	"Twist"	3:35
	a song from Natural History
7.	"Only Role in Town"	4:44
8.	"Even the Stars"	3:58
	previously unreleased track
9.	"The Runaways"	3:15
10.	"Because"	5:00
	a song from Natural History
11.	"At the Sea"	2:19

== Personnel ==
=== Instruments ===
I Am Kloot:

- John Bramwell
- Andy Hargreaves
- Peter Jobson

featuring:

- Norman McLeod – guitar, pedal steel guitar, lap steel guitar
- Colin McLeod – piano, Hammond organ, Rhodes

=== Production and mixing ===
CD:

- The McLeod Brothers (Colin & Norman McLeod) & I Am Kloot – production
- Seadna McPhail – engineering (all tracks except "Only Role in Town")
- Dan Broad – engineering ("Only Role in Town")
- Richard Knowles – live engineering
- Danny McTauge – assistant
- Colin McLeod & I Am Kloot – mixing
- Keir Stewart – mastering (at Inch Studios)

DVD:

- John Robb – interview
- Mike Buttery, Ben Gordon, Nick Gillespie – camera
- Richard Goodaire – lighting/camera
- Alex Meadows – additional photography and stills
- Seadna McPhail – sound recording
- Danny McTague – recording assistant
- Phil Bulleyment – sound mixing
- Rachael Kichenside – production assistant
- Leif Johnson – editor
- Mike Buttery – assistant producer
- Daniel Parrott – producer/director
- Channel M Television – production

=== Artwork ===
- Alex Meadows – photography

== Singles ==
title	label	format, catalog number	release date	track listing
"Hey Little Bird"	[PIAS] Recordings	CDS, 556.4773.322	2008, United Kingdom	1. "Hey Little Bird" – 2:49; 2. "Hey Little Bird (Demo)" – 3:15
"Hey Little Bird"	[PIAS] Germany	Download	22 August 2008	1. "Hey Little Bird" – 2:49; 2. "Hey Little Bird (Demo)" – 3:15
