= Secret Story Network =

- Designers: Krishna Stott
- Publishers: Bellyfeel
- Years active: 2017–present
- Genres: Online role-playing game
- Systems: WhatsApp
- Playing time: Around 2 hours
- Skills: Storytelling, Role-playing, Improvisation

Secret Story Network (commonly abbreviated as SSN) is an online interactive storytelling experience which operates live role-playing games (RPGs or LARPs). Hosted over WhatsApp, SSN was created in 2017 by film, multimedia, and transmedia artist Krishna Stott, creative developer at Bellyfeel, and known for the earlier award-winning interactive film projects Crimeface (2008) and Bolton Storyworld: Codename Winterhill (2016).

The stories at SSN led events are specially commissioned and have included transmedia tie-ins, such as with Freemantle for the Australian soap opera Neighbours and with the tabletop role-playing game Titan Effect; some of these stories are available or will be available in the future for participant led SSN story events.

Upon the launch of SSN, Nataly Ríos Goicoechea - from Conducttr (an online service for interactive, multi-platform learning, entertainment and marketing) - called the project 'very interesting' saying she couldn't think of anything like it; her review in Transmedia Storytelling went on to maintain that the use of WhatsApp, the 'most common messenger platform', makes the experience 'very accessible for people'. In 2018, and with Arts Council England National Lottery funding seeing the release of the first full season of stories, Richard Adams from TECHnique wrote that SSN was a space to 'create compelling stories and unforgettable user experiences'. With further seasons the following years, web app development begun in 2019 is due to complete in 2022 allowing users to run their own stories.

== SSN Led Story Events ==
=== Overview ===
The Secret Story Network runs live interactive story-games that are experienced over the WhatsApp chat app on smartphones and tablets. The stories are role-playing games which are led by a story conductor and are played by active participants who act through their characters. Participants are recruited via SSN social media accounts on platforms such as Facebook with animated teasers videos.

=== Stories and Storyworlds ===
The stories used by SSN are specially commissioned from writers from the disparate worlds of film, TV, novel and short stories, gaming, and stand-up comedy. Many of the stories take place in story-worlds created for SSN events; however there have also been transmedia tie-ins, such as with the Australian soap opera Neighbours and the tabletop role-playing game Titan Effect. According to SSN they 'work with both established writers who want to try something new, and exciting new writers who are just starting out in their respective industries', as well as 'champion[ing] all sorts of voices from women writers and writers of colour in order to find more and more diverse stories for participants to experience'.

=== Story conductors ===
Each session is run by an SSN conductor, sometimes, though not always, the author of the story. Since launch, SSN have convened many different stories with some running for just a single session, others returning for repeat sessions – although due to the unique participatory nature of each event, no repeating story will play out the same as a previous one. Krishna Stott's own ‘Enter Inside Black Space’ currently has the most outings so far.

=== Participants ===
Participation is free to both join the network and take part in a session. Participants sign up to join the network, and are sent invitations when a session is announced. At the arranged time, participants sign in to the SSN WhatsApp group using smartphones or tablets. Each participant is assigned a character, and the conductor leads the characters through the story, with participants having the chance to push the story in various directions.

== Participant Led Story Events ==
=== Overview ===
The Secret Story Network will launch a web-app in 2022 that will allow participants to create their own story-events. One of the participants will take on the role of the conductor, while the others will take on the roles of assigned characters. These participant led sessions can either use the story-events created by SSN, or create their own story-worlds and story-games.

== Development ==
=== Idea and initial launch: 2016-2017 ===
The idea for the Secret Story Network came – according to Stott – during a midnight conversation in late 2016 that turned to the WhatsApp phenomenon. In January of that year, co-founder of WhatsApp Jan Koum announced there would no longer charge an annual subscription fee so as to encourage users without credit cards to join the platform. And by mid-2016 the company reported an explosion of users of WhatsApp. As Stott told Nataly Ríos Goicoechea during an interview for Conducttr mid-2017: ‘It was an accident... I was chatting with somebody who I worked with and we were swapping stories and ideas and all of a sudden we found ourselves in a story at about midnight one night'. Stott found himself in a situation where they were building stories live through interactions, such as sending pictures, ideas, and music. SSN was launched in April 2017 through Stott's Bellyfeel company with the ‘Space is a Bitch’ story-game written and conducted by Lee Robinson.

=== Arts Council England (ACE)/LBU period: 2017-2018 ===
One of the participants in these early sessions was Dr Anna Zaluczkowska, a research academic, writer, and filmmaker from Leeds Beckett University (LBU). As Stott tells it, while the ‘project started with Bellyfeel a couple of years ago just as a fun kind of interactive thing that we were doing amongst ourselves’, then Zaluczkowska experienced ‘the story-games we were making, and she really liked it and so she came on board the project'. Zaluczkowska secured Arts Council England (ACE) National Lottery funding, as well as funding from Leeds Beckett University and the Higher Education Academy. This allowed Stott to commission and release of the first full season of stories. Zaluczkowska would go on to present papers on the experience at a number of academic conferences. Bellythink Publishing – a subsidiary company of Bellyfeel Productions – published The Secret Story Network Playbook (2019) which both documented the first season of story-games as well as provided templates and ideas for future productions. As the Introduction stated this was a ‘year-long research and development project’ where a team ‘from around the world, from different creative fields’ ‘created a number of exciting interactive stories’.

=== XR Stories and Lawrence Batley Theatre period: 2019-2020 ===
In 2019 Bellyfeel secured funding for SSN from XR Stories – a ‘research and development’ project by the Arts and Humanities Research Council (AHRC), the European Regional Development Fund (ERDF), the University of York, the British Film Institute (BFI) and Screen Yorkshire for the ‘future of immersive and interactive storytelling’. The aims of this funding were twofold: to explore the transmedia potential for the 'development of stories that ran alongside popular TV shows' and the creation of an 'SSN app prototype' that would 'make it easier to recruit, market and allocate places for SSN live online experiences'.

The Lawrence Batley Theatre (Huddersfield, West Yorkshire) closed its doors on Tuesday 17 March 2020 due to the COVID-19 pandemic, they soon launched LBTV, a ‘free platform of creative content’. This quickly led to a collaboration with Bellyfeel and a new season of SSN story-games. Each week over a nine-week period from March to May, a SSN story-game was convened using the Lawrence Batley Theatre's Facebook aimed at the theatre's longstanding audience.

Toward the end of 2020 the XR Stories collaboration came to fruition: the SSN app was trialled and two transmedia hook-ups were launched. Over a series of story-games run during August and September the SSN app was tested alongside the traditional recruitment processes over social media. The app proved a partial success but was seen to be more complicated for users than the traditional method. Two of these stories were transmedia events in collaboration with pre-existing intellectual property rights: one a TV show and the other a tabletop role-playing game. In early August 2020 a 'Top Secret SSN Story' by writers Jack Roberts and Brendan McGlynn – this story turned out to be a collaboration with Fremantle set in the world of the Australian television soap opera Neighbours. In late September SSN teamed up with Knight Errant Media for a story-game set in the world of Titan Effect, written by the tabletop role-playing game's creator Christian Nommay.

=== Screen Industries Growth Network (SIGN) period: 2021 – present ===
With the success of transmedia hook-ups, Bellyfeel secured funding from the Screen Industries Growth Network (SIGN) to continue the development of the app for full roll-out in 2022. At the same time, SSN are running seasons of story-games and continues to commission new work from writers. A further ambition is for SSN to work with the public sector: 'We believe collaborative storytelling helps young people learn and can help improve mental health'.

== SSN Commissioned Stories ==
=== Overview ===
Below are the story events created for SSN according to the first time they were played. Each SSN season will re-play some story-games as well as introduce new story-games. Many of these titles will be released as templates for participant led sessions from late 2002 onwards.

=== Stories ===
| Title | Date first played | Author(s) | First Conductor(s) |
|---|---|---|---|
| Space is a Bitch | 23 April 2017 | Lee Robinson | Lee Robinson |
| Anarchy Rules | 27 March 2018 | Jack Roberts | Jack Roberts |
| Defector | 2 July 2018 | Brendan McGlynn | Brendan McGlynn |
| Dance Around The Fire | 12 July 2018 | Zvonimir Barać | Zvonimir Barać |
| Agony Aunts | 21 September 2018 | Anna Zaluczkowska | Anna Zaluczkowska |
| Enter Inside Black Space | 14 October 2018 | Krishna Stott | Krishna Stott |
| B-Good Heroes and the Case of Stolen Renewables | 27 November 2018 | Maya Zuckerman | Lee Robinson |
| Mr Catty’s House | 30 November 2018 | Bilal Zafar | Bilal Zafar |
| Enter Inside Black Space | 5 December 2018 | Krishna Stott | Krishna Stott |
| Divided Kingdom | 7 December 2018 | Brad Gyori | Brad Gyori |
| The Haunted Library | 17 December 2018 | Susan Burns | Susan Burns |
| Zapocalypse | 27 March 2020 | Krishna Stott | Krishna Stott, Anna Zaluczkowska, Zvonimir Barać, and Ryan Lewis |
| Mr Catty’s House | 7 April 2020 | Bilal Zafar | Krishna Stott |
| Lady Lucinda’s Voyage Into Unknown | 12 May 2020 | Ela Gašperov | Zvonimir Barać |
| Permafrost | 19 May 2020 | Gautama Ramesh | Gautama Ramesh |
| Invisible Facts | 4 August 2020 | Louise Malkinson and Krishna Stott | Krishna Stott |
| Top Secret SSN Story [Revealed to be Neighbours] | 11 August 2020 | Jack Roberts and Brendan Mcglynn | Jack Roberts, Brendan Mcglynn and Krishna Stott |
| Titan Effect: Chimera Protocol | 22 September 2020 | Christian Nommay | Lee Robinson |
| Waiting for You | 3 May 2022 | Maja Bodenstein | Maja Bodenstein |
| Letter to the U.D.O. | 16 June 2022 | Eleonora Mignoli | Eleonora Mignoli |

== Reception ==
=== Participants ===
During the ACE/LBU period (2017–2018) participants were able to leave feedback regarding the story-events they took part in during the first season proper (2018). This feedback was published in the Secret Story Network Playbook and some of the feedback was shared in a talk titled 'Writing with audiences' by LBU collaborator Anna Zaluczkowska at the Writing for Screens Symposium at the University of Portsmouth in 2019. Feedback included: 'It was my first time doing it, and it was a very welcoming experience. It was light-hearted but people really committed to their characters and made it fun. It required lots of imagination but never felt like too much pressure on us, and our characters and the scenes were portrayed simply and clearly but with lots of creativity and enough detail.' Another person wrote: 'It wasn't just fighting, killing, weapons etc. It's a feelgood story... puzzles were nice'. Other feedback included: 'I liked the nonlinear possibilities'; 'The unexpected direction kept me on the edge of my seat'; and; 'When the audience has to be creative is best'.

=== Media ===
Nataly Ríos Goicoechea from Conducttr in a review on Transmedia Storytelling called the project 'very interesting', that there was nothing else like it, that the use of WhatsApp and that using WhatsApp makes the experience 'very accessible for people'. Richard Adams from TECHnique wrote that the SSN led sessions 'create[d] compelling stories' and gave participants 'unforgettable user experiences'.

=== Academic ===
There have been two academic presentations on SSN by Anna Zaluczkowska: the Writing for Screens Symposium at the University of Portsmouth in 2019 ('Writing with audiences: negotiating the narrative') and the International Association for Media and Communications Research (IAMCR) online conference in Participatory Communication Research in 2020 ('Negotiating the narrative – audiences writing in Secret Story Network'). In July 2022 Zaluczkowska and co-writer Dr Bradford Gyori had a research paper published in the Journal of Screenwriting titled ‘How We Role: The collaborative role playing poetics of the Secret Story Network’.
