= Maybe I Should =

Single by I Am Kloot
- A-side: "Maybe I Should"
- B-side: "Strange Little Girl"
- Released: 21 November 2005
- Recorded: Blueprint Studio, Salford
- Genre: Indie rock
- Length: 5:23
- Label: Skinny Dog
- Songwriter(s): John Bramwell
- Producer(s): Guy Garvey & Craig Potter (Elbow)

I Am Kloot singles chronology
"Over My Shoulder" (2005)	"Maybe I Should" (2005)

Professional ratings
Review scores
Source	Rating
Leeds Music Scene	4/5 stars

"Maybe I Should" is the first single I Am Kloot released after parting ways with their former record label Echo. The songs were recorded during the autumn of 2005. The single was released on 21 November 2005 by Skinny Dog label, co-founded by I Am Kloot's bass player, Peter Jobson, and Elbow's lead vocalist, Guy Garvey. The music was produced by Guy Garvey and Craig Potter.

The single reached #128 on the UK Singles Chart.

== Track listing ==
All songs written by John Harold Arnold Bramwell.

1. "Maybe I Should" – 3:08
2. "Strange Little Girl" – 2:15
