= Bolton Storyworld: Codename Winterhill =

- Bolton Storyworld: Codename Winterhill transmedia experience poster
- Directed by: Ashok Baker; Phillip Shotton; Amy Cookson
- Written by: Lee Robinson; Holly Roberts; Anna Zaluczkowska; Jamie Coles; Jane Collard; Courtney McGrail; Amy Louise Cookson; Ashok Baker
- Produced by: Krishna Stott
- Starring: Natalie Biggs; Kate Cansdale; Rick Bithell
- Cinematography: Chris Forshaw; Conall Ranaghan; Mohammed Osman; Magdalena Schedler
- Edited by: Abby Trotter
- Production company: Bellyfeel
- Distributed by: Conducttr
- Release date: 2016
- Running time: 5 days
- Country: United Kingdom
- Language: English

Bolton Storyworld: Codename Winterhill is a live-action interactive transmedia thriller which in its final form went live in April 2016. The experience takes place on a participant’s smartphone and involves receiving text and voice messages, exploring websites, participating in puzzles, and watching filmed videos. Lasting five days, the experience operates to a Participant Activated Release Schedule (PARS): as soon as participants activate the experience by texting a code to a promoted mobile number, they initiate the release of media to their smartphones according to a pre-set schedule.

The thriller is set in Bolton and follows a missing-person investigation by three students: Spoon, Lizzie, and Derek. As the narration progresses the experience opens up to explore the theme of the truth versus fiction through conspiracy theories, alien abductions, and secret societies – ultimately leaving the participant in a disturbing open ended situation where ‘they could be next’. It was produced by Bellyfeel, with film, multimedia, and transmedia artist Krishna Stott – whose previous project was the award-winning interactive film Crimeface (2008) – acting as creative director and showrunner.

Bolton Storyworld: Codename Winterhill went on to be selected for The Seattle Transmedia and Independent Film Festival in 2016. Also that year the production went on to win the prestigious Premier Award at Learning on Screen Awards. The critical consensus from the judging panel being that ‘this outstanding production’ was an ‘'innovative and immersive piece of digital storytelling' and ‘unlike anything the jury have seen before’. In 2019, a film version of the 2016 experience was released.

== Cast ==
- Natalie Biggs as Spoon
- Kate Cansdale as Lizzie
- Rick Bithell as Derek
- David Crellin as Justin McManus
- Tracey Sheals as Aunt Flo
- Abdullah Afzal as Will Spender
- Joanne Barrett as Annabel Jones
- Phil Novak as Sonny Purcell

== Production ==
=== Here and Now (2011) ===
The project began life in 2011 when Stott was asked to consult on a project called ‘’Here and Now’’ at Bolton University. This project created a series of characters who posted on Facebook in character creating drama through their interactions.

=== Bolton Storyworld (2012–2013) ===
In 2012 with funding secured, the project was renamed ‘’Bolton Storyworld’’. Students at Bolton University began making their own short films based upon the lives of the characters, and sharing them on YouTube. This project was thought of as a prototype for creating an interactive, transmedia environment.

=== Codename Winterhill (2014–2016) ===
In 2013 Bellyfeel took over full creative control. Utilizing the archive of the prototypes they created a narrative from the disparate elements of the storyworld creating a narration in the form of a thriller adding the subtitle Codename Winterhill. The experience ran for the first time in October 2014. After being refined during 2015, attained its final form for release in 2016.

=== BSW:CNW Artefact (2019) ===
In 2019, Bolton Storyworld: Codename Winterhill - Artefact (2016) was released. This 55 minute film followed the narration of the 2016 event. Organised into chapters covering the five days, the film included much of the video footage, text messages, and website puzzles experienced by the participants during the event.

== Awards ==
The 2016 production won the prestigious Premier Award at Learning on Screen Awards (UK). The critical consensus from the judging panel was that ‘this outstanding production’ was an ‘'innovative and immersive piece of digital storytelling' and ‘unlike anything the jury have seen before’.
