= Sky at Night (album) =

Studio album by I Am Kloot
- Released: 5 July 2010
- Length: 39:26
- Label: Shepherd Moon / EMI
- Producer: Guy Garvey and Craig Potter

I Am Kloot chronology
| B (2009) | Sky at Night (2010) | Let It All In (2013) |

Singles from Sky at Night
- 1. "Northern Skies / Lately" Released: 2010; 2. "Proof" Released: 2010; 3. "Fingerprints" Released: 2010

Professional ratings
Aggregate scores
| Source | Rating |
|---|---|
| Metacritic | 82/100 |
Review scores
| Source | Rating |
| AllMusic | 3.5/5 stars |
| Drowned in Sound | 9/10 |
| Evening Standard | 4/5 stars |
| Financial Times | 4/5 stars |
| The Guardian | 4/5 stars |
| The Independent | 3/5 stars |
| musicOMH | 4/5 stars |
| PopMatters | 8/10 |
| Q | 4/5 stars |
| Uncut | 4/5 stars |

Sky at Night is the fifth studio album by English rock band I Am Kloot. The album was produced by Guy Garvey and Craig Potter of the band Elbow and was released on 5 July 2010. Since 2 July 2010, the whole album has been streamed for free on the guardian.co.uk website.

On 20 July 2010, the album made the shortlist for the 2010 Mercury Music Prize. On 15 November 2010, it was announced that Sky at Night has received the German Record Critics' Award (Preis der deutschen Schallplattenkritik) in the "Pop and Rock" category.

== Track listing ==
The track listing for the album is as follows:

| 1. | "Northern Skies" | 4:04 |
| 2. | "To the Brink" | 4:18 |
| 3. | "Fingerprints" | 4:33 |
| 4. | "Lately" | 3:56 |
| 5. | "I Still Do" | 3:02 |
| 6. | "The Moon Is a Blind Eye" | 4:07 |
| 7. | "Proof" | 2:51 |
| | a new version of "Proof" from the album I Am Kloot |
| 8. | "It's Just the Night" | 3:00 |
| 9. | "Radiation" | 6:11 |
| 10. | "Same Shoes" | 3:20 |

All songs written by John Bramwell. The line "we've got all the bullets, but there's no-one left to shoot" comes from "Oblivious" – a song by Aztec Camera.

The Japanese edition of Sky at Night includes additional track (#11) called "Black & Blue". The original version of this song appeared on You, Me and the Alarm Clock (1990) – a solo album by John Bramwell, then known as Johnny Dangerously.

== Personnel ==
=== Instruments ===
I Am Kloot:

- John Harold Arnold Bramwell
- Andy Hargreaves
- Peter Jobson

additional musicians:

- Prabjote Osahn – violin – tracks 1, 2 & 3
- Stella Page – viola – tracks 1, 2 & 3
- Margit van der Zwan – cello – tracks 1, 2 & 3
- Marie Leenhardt – harp – tracks 5 & 6
- Tony Gilfellon – guitar – track 2
- Bob Marsh – trumpet – tracks 2 & 10
- Peter McPhail – saxophone & flute – tracks 4, 9 & 10
- Colin McLeod – piano – track 10
- Norman McLeod – pedal steel guitar – track 10

others:

- Guy Garvey – string arrangements

=== Production and mixing ===
- Guy Garvey & Craig Potter – production
- Craig Potter – mixing (at Blueprint Studios)
- Tim Young – mastering (at Metropolis Studios)
- Colin McLeod – additional production & engineering – track 10
- Seadna McPhail – additional engineering – tracks 1, 3, 4, 6, 8 & 10

=== Artwork ===
- Gerald Jenkins – band photography
- Paul Brownless – design

== Singles ==
| title | label | format, catalog number | release date | track listing |
|---|---|---|---|---|
| "Northern Skies" / "Lately" (double A-side) | Shepherd Moon | download | 30 May 2010 on iTunes / 1 June 2010 | 1. "Northern Skies" 4:05; 2. "Lately" 3:56 |
| "Proof" | Shepherd Moon | download | 6 September 2010 | 1. "Proof (Radio Edit)" 2:39; 2. "Proof (Original Demo – 1999)" 2:47 |
| "Fingerprints" | Shepherd Moon | download | 5 November 2010 on iTunes | 1. "Fingerprints (Radio Edit)" 3:21; 2. "Fingerprints (Album Version)" 4:36; 3. "Fingerprints (Instrumental)" 4:35 |
| "Fingerprints" | Shepherd Moon | download | 12 November 2010 on iTunes | 1. "Fingerprints (Radio Edit)" 3:21; 2. "Black & Blue" 2:27 |

== Release history ==
| Country | Release date |
|---|---|
| United Kingdom | 5 July 2010 |
| United States | 13 July 2010 |
