= Julian Gaskell =

British musician

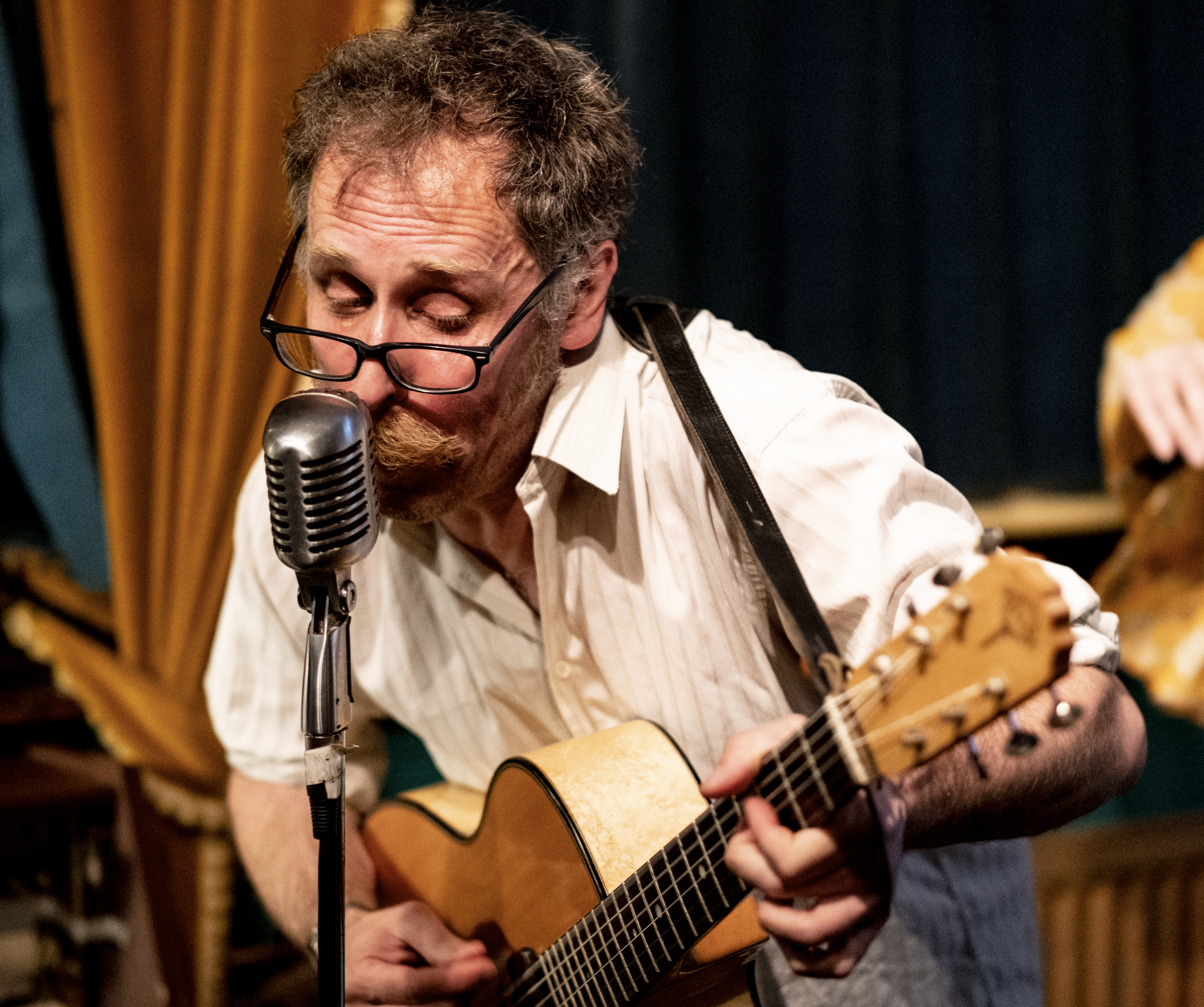
- Gaskell performing at Jamboree, London, 2019

Background information
- Origin: Cornwall, England
- Genres: folk, skiffle, klezmer, punk, surf, indie, blues, jazz
- Years active: 2000–present
- Website: juliangaskell.co.uk

Julian Gaskell is a British multi-instrumentalist, band leader, composer and singer-songwriter, who spent several years writing, recording and performing in Manchester, and is now based in Falmouth, England. He has performed and recorded solo, as well as being a founder member of a number of bands, including Loafer, Icons of Poundland, Leigh Delamere & the Gordanos and Julian Gaskell and his Ragged Trousered Philanthropists.

== History ==
=== Loafer and Icons of Poundland ===
Gaskell studied Popular Music at the University of Salford and for a time played in the band Indigo Jones, leaving shortly after the release of their first single. In the early 2000s he performed and recorded extensively with two Manchester-based punk bands, Loafer and Icons of Poundland, alongside Ben Emissah on drums, Kester Jones on keyboards and guitar, and Alex Timewell who played bass. Loafer released much of their material independently via their own label Lipstick Head Records, including the album Care in the Community which they toured around the country. Gaskell was a regular at Manchester venue Big Hands and Icons performed a residency there in 2003. Both acts featured prominent guitar work, as well as instrumental assistance (particularly on Hammond Organ and second guitar) from Kester Jones who has continued to contribute to Gaskell's recordings until the present day. During this period, he also worked as a producer for Tom Hingley and the Lovers, I Am Kloot, Fast Cars, Jackie-O, Moco, The Obsession, Loose Canon and Kirsty McGee.

=== Solo and with the Ragged Trousered Philanthropists ===
After relocating to Cornwall, Gaskell recorded and released the 17-track set, Technology Will Make Us Better, through Top of the Hill recordings in 2005. The record received favourable reviews among a number of publications such as Manchester Music and 247 Magazine.

In 2006 Thomas Sharpe (also of Zapoppin') began playing bass for Gaskell as one of his Ragged Trousered Philanthropists along with Kester Jones. The band (named after the novel by Robert Tressell) would later come to include Dan Pye on Guitar and Rory Pugh on drums as well as a number of other guest players. The band self-released two studio albums and a number of EPs and digital downloads between 2006 and 2009 receiving radio airplay from the BBC's Steve Lamacq, as well as positive reviews from fRoots and 247 Magazine.

=== Theatre accompaniment and further solo work ===
Post-Philanthropists, Gaskell has written and performed globally for Bash Street Theatre Company and Rogue Theatre. Gaskell joined Bash Street Theatre in 2009 when he composed and performed a silent movie piano soundtrack for the work 'The Lion Tamer', the recording of which was later released independently by Gaskell. Following his work on 'The Lion Tamer', he toured with the company in 2010 playing accordion in productions. In April 2011, Salford's Lowry Theatre hosted The Rogue Theatre for a run of their cabaret work 'The Dancer and the Devil' which featured music composed by and performed throughout by Gaskell. In January 2012 he self-released (with distribution assistance from Metronome) a new solo album: Kind Words From Home.

In 2021 Julian returned to working with Bash Street Theatre on their show 'The Cameraman', which toured the UK in the summer of 2021.

=== The return of the Ragged Trousered Philanthropists ===
In 2014, Gaskell re-convened the Ragged Trousered Philanthropists with a modified lineup - Thomas Sharpe now on banjo, piano, mandolin and vocals, Nigel Parsons on bass and Matthew Collington on drums. They released a well-received album "Carvery of Blight" in 2016 and gigged around Cornwall (as full band or as Gaskell & Sharpe duo) around this time. They appeared at Glastonbury Festival in 2014, and even played at the Kensington Palace Christmas party. In 2019 the lineup was modified to a more acoustic/folk based trio with Thomas Sharpe still present on banjo, upright bass and piano and the addition of Cally Gibson on violin and viola. This lineup continues to perform, mostly around Cornwall, and recorded the 2020 album 'Out of the Trees'

=== Leigh Delamere & the Gordanos ===
Featuring the same lineup as the post-2014 Ragged Trousered Philanthropists, Leigh Delamere & the Gordanos have gigged around the UK since 2016 as "an upright-piano mangling barrelhouse banjo homage to the greats of rhythm’n’blues, garage rock, boogie woogie and ragtime in an old-timey skiffle party style". They appeared at the Great Estate, Boardmasters and Masked Ball festivals in Cornwall, and ran a 1930s speakeasy stage "The Blind Pig" at these.

== Critical reception ==
Gaskell's songwriting has been described as "very smart, very droll" by critic Everett True, while musically his recordings have often been noted for the combinations of genres and influences on display with fRoots editor, Ian Anderson writing of the Ragged Trousered Philanthropists: "What’s there not to like about this great little quintet? Scurrying out of Falmouth in Cornwall, their bustling, belting, lopsided accordion-led sound branches somewhere off the same musical family tree that gave us top Belgian faves Jaune Toujours and the long-lost La Cucina, with the rural literary flair of Blyth Power, XTC and Dancing Did chucked in the mix."

"Carvery of Blight" received 5 star reviews in Vive le Rock "Very occasionally, a set of songs emerge that features such originality, intelligence and appeal that the ability to hear suddenly seems like a privilege and it’s difficult not to gush" and R2 (Rock'n'Reel) "Blending folk, punk, klezmer, cabaret and Gypsy rhythms – and pretty much any other genre that falls in its way, the album’s melting pot is firmly rooted and anchored by Gaskell’s powerful rasp of a voice, as melodious as it is guttural, and from foot-stomping folk and rock to ‘The Extended Trilogy’, a ballad fit for Jacques Brel."

== Other work ==
Gaskell has lectured in music at Truro and Penwith College and at dBs Music in Cornwall, he also worked with Dom Allen to create the "Anthropic Organ" a pipe-organ based installation which was commissioned by Glastonbury Festival in 2014.

== Selected discography ==
=== Studio albums ===
- Care in the Community (credited to Loafer, self-released, 2001)
- Icons of Poundland (credited to Icons of Poundland, self-released, 2003)
- The World of Icons of Poundland (credited to Icons of Poundland, self-released, 2004)
- Technology Will Make Us Better (credited to Mr Julian Gaskell, Top of the Hill, 2005)
- Julian Gaskell and his Ragged Trousered Philanthropists (credited to Julian Gaskell and his Ragged Trousered Philanthropists, self-released, 2007)
- Here The Brute Harpies Make Their Nests (credited to Julian Gaskell and his Ragged Trousered Philanthropists, self-released, 2009)
- The Lion Tamer (credited to Julian Gaskell, self-released 2010)
- Kind Words From Home (credited to Julian Gaskell, self-released, 2012)
- Carvery of Blight (credited to Julian Gaskell and his Ragged Trousered Philanthropists, Carvery of Sound, 2016)
- Skifflin' the Solstice Boogie (credited to Leigh Delamere & the Gordanos, Blind Pig Boogie, 2018)
- Out of the Trees (Credited to Julian Gaskell, self-released 2020)

=== EPs ===
- Lost in Euston (credited to Loafer, Uglyman Records, 2000)
- An Infestation Ye Cannot Clear (credited to Mr Julian Gaskell and his band of Ragged Trousered Philanthropists, self-released, 2006)
- The Modern Day Festival (credited to Julian Gaskell and his Ragged Trousered Philanthropists, self-released, 2008)
