= Gideon Conn =

- Born: Gideon Marc Conn; 15 January 1980 (age 46); Manchester, England
- Genres: Acoustic, hip hop, jazz-pop, folk
- Occupations: Singer-songwriter, musician, artist
- Instruments: Vocals, guitar, piano
- Years active: 2004–present
- Website: GideonConn.com

Gideon Marc Conn (born 15 January 1980) is an English singer-songwriter from Manchester. He tours extensively around the UK, having played at many UK festivals including Glastonbury Festival.

Also a painter, drawer and sculptor.

== Early life ==
Conn began writing and playing music at the age of 15 when his friend taught him a handful of guitar chords; he began adding vocals to these chords and thus began his interest in composition. While completing his art degree in Manchester, he was known to play the piano in the main gallery of the university, as well as using the whole building as a studio for his sculptures.

He graduated in 2003 and continues to paint, draw and sculpt alongside his pursuit of music. He has had many exhibitions in both Manchester and in London. Having worked as a labourer for a year following his attending of university he decided to pursue a career as an artist and musician.

== Music career ==
Conn's songwriting combines fingerpicking acoustic playing with jazz-inspired chord progressions and hip-hop rhythms. His vocal delivery encompasses singing, rapping and scatting. His music varies between a synth-laden modern sound and a more lo-fi production. He takes inspiration from a wide range of influences, primarily in soul and jazz music, and has expressed admiration for artists such as Stevie Wonder, Badly Drawn Boy, OutKast, Nat King Cole and The Yeah Yeah Yeahs.

In the early stages of his music career, Conn self-released albums, EPs and singles; this included his Connpilation series. His first official single "I Want You Around" came out on Mannequin Republic on 10" vinyl. His first album was New Bop Sounds in March 2010. He then recorded the football-themed single "Get Your Hopes Up (Win, Win, Win)" with Clint Boon, which was released just ahead of the 2010 World Cup, on 31 May 2010.

The second album Take It All was released in 2012, with a video for its lead single "Fall Under Tokyo" being filmed in Tokyo. It featured the Manchester-based soul singer Josephine on the track "Colours".

November 2013 saw the release of Highlights and Perceptions on 12-inch vinyl and digital download. The album is essentially two EPs; side A (Highlights) being made up of Donna Maciocia material, while side B (Perceptions) comprises five tracks from Conn. The cover art was designed by both artists.

Conn released his third album Hip Hop Original on 27 November 2015. Two singles were released from this album; "I Just Don't Know You Very Well" on 9 October 2015 and "Crystallised" on 13 May 2016.

Conn's fourth album, Being Gideon, was released on 24 October 2019. This had been preceded by the single "It's Your Turn" on 23 August 2019.

Conn has been played on XFM Radio and on BBC Radio 1 by Huw Stephens, and was the subject of a documentary called Hitting Home: Good Luck Gideon, which was broadcast on Channel M. He was included on the 'A-Z Bestival' Compilation as the letter 'G'. With Scroobius Pip and Ed Sheeran as self-professed fans, he supported popular American singer-songwriter Jason Mraz on his 2008 UK tour.

== Discography ==
- "I Want You Around" (Single, 2008)
- "Londonderry" (Single, 2009)
- New Bop Sounds (Album, 2010)
- Take It All (Album, 2012)
- Highlights & Perceptions (Split album with Donna Maciocia, 2013)
- "Black Hole Sun" (Soundgarden cover) (Digital Download, 2015)
- "I Just Don’t Know You Very Well" (Single, 2015)
- "Deception" (Blackalicious cover) (Digital Download, 2015)
- Hip Hop Original (Album, 2015)
- "Crystallised" (Single, 2016)
- "I Wish I Was A Volkswagen Beetle" (Digital Download, 2017)
- "It's Your Turn" (Single, 2019)
- Being Gideon (Album, 2019)
