= Proof (I Am Kloot song) =

2001 single by I Am Kloot

Song by I Am Kloot

from the album I Am Kloot
- Released: 15 September 2003
- Length: 2:46
- Label: The Echo Label
- Songwriter(s): John Bramwell
- Producer(s): Chris Potter

"Proof"

Song by I Am Kloot

from the album Sky at Night
- Released: 5 July 2010
- Length: 2:51
- Label: Shepherd Moon / EMI
- Songwriter(s): John Bramwell
- Producer(s): Guy Garvey & Craig Potter

"Proof" is a song by English band I Am Kloot, and exists in a number of versions released between 2001 and 2010. The song has been released as a single twice in 2004 and then 2010, and has a music video by British filmmaker Krishna Stott featuring the actor Christopher Eccleston.

== Release ==
A demo version of "Proof" was released in 2001 as a B-side on the single "Morning Rain" from the album Natural History. This version is also included on the compilation album B from 2009.

In 2003, the song appeared on I Am Kloot's self-titled second album. Even after the production of a video for "Proof" (by Krishna Stott and featuring Christopher Eccleston), their then record label, Echo, shelved the release. "Proof" was released on 21 June 2004 as a download-only single, but it did not receive its intended, full release.

Finally, in 2010, a remodelling of the song was produced for their fifth studio album, Mercury nominated Sky at Night. This new version of "Proof" was released as a download-only single on 6 September 2010 – the second single, following "Northern Skies". This single also saw the release of the original music video with the new audio, again in September 2010.

== Music video ==
Proof music video

The music video for "Proof" is a nearly three minute long take, an intense close-up of the face of British actor Christopher Eccleston (Doctor Who, The Leftovers).

It was directed by film, multimedia, and transmedia artist Krishna Stott (Crimeface, Secret Story Network). In an interview with City Life, Stott said "It's one of the nicest things I've made [...] It's one shot: Christopher Eccleston just delivering emotions along with the song. He does it with such aplomb - it's quite breathtaking." Originally filmed in 2003 for the projected 2004 release, the video finally came out - re-mastered to widescreen and with the new version of the song - in 2010. Subsequently, the original version of the video with song have been leaked online.

== Single track listings ==
2004 release:

1. "Proof"
2. "Junk Culture"
3. "Same Deep Water as Me (live at the Ritz- Manchester)"
4. "Proof" (music video)

The original version of "Junk Culture" appeared on You, Me and the Alarm Clock (1989) – a solo album of John Bramwell, then known as Johnny Dangerously.

2010 release:

1. "Proof (Radio Edit)" 2:39
2. "Proof (Original Demo – 1999)" 2:47
