= From There to Here =

- Genre: Drama
- Created by: Peter Bowker
- Directed by: James Strong
- Starring: Philip Glenister; Bernard Hill; Steven Mackintosh; Saskia Reeves; Liz White; Daniel Rigby; Morven Christie
- Country of origin: United Kingdom
- Original language: English
- No. of series: 1
- No. of episodes: 3

Production
- Executive producers: Peter Bowker; Derek Wax; Stephen Wright
- Producer: Tim Bricknell
- Running time: 60 minutes
- Production company: Kudos

Original release
- Network: BBC One; BBC One HD
- Release: 22 May – 5 June 2014

From There to Here is a British drama television series, first broadcast on BBC One on 22 May 2014. The drama begins in June 1996, on the day of the 1996 Manchester bombing and covers four years, including New Labour in government in 1997 and the Millennium celebrations of 2000.

== Plot ==
A sweet factory is run by both Daniel Cotton (Philip Glenister) and his father Samuel Cotton (Bernard Hill). Daniel lives with his wife Clare (Saskia Reeves) and their two children, Charlie (Daniel Rigby) and Louise (Morven Christie). Daniel's brother Robbo (Steven Mackintosh) runs a nightclub in Manchester and has a rift with Samuel. Daniel, Samuel and Robbo are the victims of a blast, along with Joanne (Liz White), a hotel cleaner.

== Cast ==
- Philip Glenister as Daniel Cotton
- Bernard Hill as Samuel Cotton, Daniel's father
- Steven Mackintosh as Robbo, Daniel's brother
- Saskia Reeves as Clare, Daniel's wife
- Liz White as Joanne, a hotel cleaner
- Daniel Rigby as Charlie, Daniel's son
- Morven Christie as Louise, Daniel's daughter
- Claire Cooper as Matilda, Charlie's girlfriend
- Simone Clark as Fliss, Charlie's girlfriend
- Andy Sykes as PC Andrews
- Jessica Parkin as Ella, Daniel's granddaughter
- Layla Clarke as Ella, Daniel's granddaughter
- Harrison Gilbert as Daniel's grandson
- Matthew Lowe as Daniel's grandson

== Music ==
The music score is composed by I Am Kloot. See also: From There to Here.

== Production ==
Peter Bowker, the creator of the series, said:

I wanted to write a love letter to Manchester – warts 'n all – and to do it through a family saga that captured something of the city's pace, life and humour. To attract a cast of this quality and a director of the calibre of James Strong is incredibly exciting and just about compensates for the presence of a City fan as executive producer in the form of fellow Mancunian, Derek Wax.

Philip Glenister who plays Daniel said: "I'm really excited to be involved in such a terrific new drama written by Peter Bowker. Also to be working alongside such an outstanding cast and crew. And of course to be back filming in my adopted home town of Manc [Manchester]!"

Derek Wax, one of the executive producers, said he was excited to be part of From There to Here with Peter Bowker, which differs from their previous collaborations that were based in Manchester (Occupation and Flesh and Blood). He also said Bowker brought "complexity, originality, scale and humour" and said of his delight about the excellence of the cast and director James Strong.

Filming began in Manchester in September 2013. The series was commissioned by Danny Cohen and Ben Stephenson. Tim Bricknell is the producer and the executive producers are Peter Bowker, Derek Wax and Stephen Wright.

== Home media ==
The DVD edition of the series was released by Acorn Media UK on 9 June 2014.
A CD with the soundtrack was released by Kudos Film and Television on 24 November 2014.
