= Leave Alone the Empty Spaces =

Studio album by John Bramwell
- Released: 2 February 2018
- Genre: Pop, acoustic music
- Length: 27 min.

John Bramwell chronology
Live 2016 (2017)	Leave Alone the Empty Spaces (2018)

Leave Alone the Empty Spaces is a solo album by John Bramwell. It was pre-released on 10 November 2017, via the Internet, as a limited, signed edition with the live album Live 2016. At that time it was only available in physical formats—as an LP and a compact disc. Purchasers received the song "Days Go By" as a free digital download. On 2 February 2018, the album was made available as a digital download and as an LP and CD in physical stores.

The fans of Bramwell had a chance to appear in the video for "Who Is Anybody?" by entering an online video competition.

== Track listing ==
Track lengths according to iTunes

1.	"A Field Full of Secrets" 2:42
2.	"Who Is Anybody?" 3:18
3.	"Time′s Arrow" 3:09
4.	"From The Shore" 3:43
5.	"Sat Beneath the Lightning Tree" 4:02
6.	"The Whipperwill" 2:49
7.	"Wherever I Go, Wherever You Are" 2:01
8.	"Leave Alone the Empty Spaces" 3:40
9.	"Meet Me at the Station" 2:03

== Singles ==
1. "Who is Anybody?" (digital, 24 November 2017)
2. "From the Shore" (digital?, 12 January 2018)
