= Over My Shoulder (I Am Kloot song) =

2005 single by I Am Kloot

Single by I Am Kloot

from the album Gods and Monsters
- Released: 2005
- Recorded: Moolah Rouge, Stockport
- Genre: Indie rock
- Length: 9:01
- Label: The Echo Label
- Songwriter: John Bramwell
- Producers: Joe Robinson & I Am Kloot

I Am Kloot singles chronology
"From Your Favourite Sky" (2004)	"Over My Shoulder" (2005)	"Maybe I Should" (2005)

"Over My Shoulder" is a single by English rock band I Am Kloot. It peaked at number 38 on the UK single chart in 2005. It preceded the album Gods And Monsters which charted lower than their previous album I Am Kloot. The song itself was first released on the Wall of Sound compilation album We Love You... So Love Us Too and re-recorded for the Gods and Monsters album. The CD added two B-sides that were originally intended for the cancelled "Proof" single.

"Great Escape" is John Bramwell performing on his own with his acoustic guitar, an old song from his solo Johnny Dangerously days and the final B-side "Junk Culture" is a band effort, once again an old Johnny Dangerously song updated. On the 7-inch vinyl single "Stop Taking Photographs" is a short solo acoustic performance by John Bramwell, in the vein of "No Fear of Falling" or "Astray".

The CD included the video of the single, featuring John walking around Manchester landmarks (most with some reference to the band's background - Big Hands bar, Night & Day Café etc.), with a beer crate attached to his foot. As he often uses a crate in lieu of a guitar strap, could be interpreted as a knowing nod to their fans.

== Track listing ==
The single was released on three formats, one CD and two 7" singles. All songs written by John Harold Arnold Bramwell.

=== CD issue ===
1. "Over My Shoulder" – 2:56
2. "Great Escape" – 2:24
3. "Junk Culture" – 3:37
4. "Over My Shoulder (Video)"

=== 7 inch vinyl (version 1) ===
1. "Over My Shoulder" – 2:56
2. "Junk Culture" – 3:37

=== 7 inch vinyl (version 2) ===
1. "Over My Shoulder (live from the Half Moon, Putney)" – 2:50
2. "Stop Taking Photographs" – 1:57
