= I Am Kloot (album) =

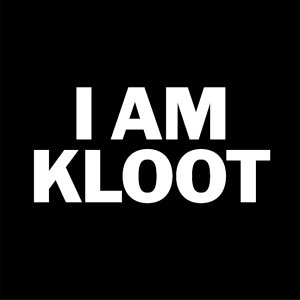

Studio album by I Am Kloot
- Released: 15 September 2003
- Genre: Indie rock
- Length: 39:05 / 43:02
- Label: The Echo Label
- Producer: Chris Potter, Scott Alexander, Keir Stewart, Ian Broudie

I Am Kloot chronology
Natural History (2001)	I Am Kloot (2003)	Gods and Monsters (2005)

Singles from I Am Kloot
- 1. "Untitled #1" Released: 24 March 2003 (limited); 2. "Life in a Day" Released: 9 June 2003; 3. "3 Feet Tall" Released: 8 September 2003; 4. "From Your Favourite Sky" Released: 22 March 2004; 5. "Proof" Released: 21 June 2004 (download only)

Professional ratings
Review scores
Source	Rating
Allmusic	4.5/5 stars
Pitchfork Media	(5.1/10)
Teraz Rock	4/5 stars
Uncut	4/5 stars
The Press	4/5 stars

I Am Kloot is the self-titled second album by English rock band I Am Kloot. Released in 2003, the album reached #68 on the UK Albums Chart and yielded four singles and one download-only single. The download-only single "Proof" had a music video created for it by Krishna Stott, featuring actor Christopher Eccleston, which never received its intended, full release. A demo of "Proof" originally appeared as a B-side to "Morning Rain" in 2001. The album contains an extra song, hidden in the pregap, called "Deep Blue Sea," also released as a B-side on the "Life in a Day" single.

The singles "Life in a Day" and "3 Feet Tall" charted on the UK Singles Chart at #43 and #46 respectively.

On 25 January 2005, I Am Kloot became the first album by I Am Kloot released in the United States. In March 2005, the band gave their first concert tour in this country.

== Track listing ==
All songs written by John Harold Arnold Bramwell.

0.	"Deep Blue Sea"	3:57
	"Deep Blue Sea" is a hidden song in the pregap of the CD edition
1.	"Untitled #1"	4:18
2.	"From Your Favourite Sky"	2:46
3.	"Life in a Day"	2:47
4.	"Here for the World"	3:26
5.	"A Strange Arrangement of Colour"	2:43
6.	"Cuckoo"	3:21
7.	"Mermaids"	3:39
8.	"Proof"	2:46
9.	"Sold as Seen"	2:56
10.	"Not a Reasonable Man"	3:06
11.	"3 Feet Tall"	3:04
12.	"The Same Deep Water as Me"	4:11

== Contributing musicians ==
- Tony Gilfellon: additional guitar on "3 Feet Tall"
- Bob Sastry: French horn on "The Same Deep Water as Me"
- Isabelle Dunn: cello on "The Same Deep Water as Me"
- Amanda Drummond: viola on "The Same Deep Water as Me"
- Stella Page: violin on "The Same Deep Water as Me"
- Prabjote Osahn: violin on "The Same Deep Water as Me"

== Release history ==
Country	Release date
United Kingdom	15 September 2003
United States	25 January 2005

== Singles ==
title	label	format, catalog number	release date	track listing	charts	additional informations
"Untitled #1"	The Echo Label	gramophone record 7", ECS134	24 March 2003	A. "Untitled #1"; B. "The Mermen"	UK Singles Chart: 101	Limited edition of 1000 copies.
"Life in a Day"	The Echo Label	gramophone record 7", ECS140	9 June 2003	A. "Life in a Day"; B. "This House Is Haunted"	UK Singles Chart: 43	Limited edition, autographed.
"Life in a Day"	The Echo Label	CDS, ECSCD140	9 June 2003	1. "Life in a Day"; 2. "This House Is Haunted"; 3. "Cinders"	UK Singles Chart: 43	
"Life in a Day"	The Echo Label	CDS, ECSCD140X	9 June 2003	1. "Life in a Day"; 2. "Deep Blue Sea"; 3. "By Myself"; 4. "Life in a Day" (music video)	UK Singles Chart: 43	
"3 Feet Tall"	The Echo Label	gramophone record 7", ECS143	8 September 2003	A. "3 Feet Tall"; B. "From Your Favourite Sky, John Peel Session"	UK Singles Chart: 46	
"3 Feet Tall"	The Echo Label	CDS, ECSCD143	8 September 2003	1. "3 Feet Tall"; 2. "From Your Favourite Sky, John Peel Session"; 3. "A Strange Arrangement of Colour (Live)"	UK Singles Chart: 46	
"3 Feet Tall"	The Echo Label	CDS, ECSCD143X	8 September 2003	1. "3 Feet Tall"; 2. "Monkeys"; 3. "Big Tears"; 4. "3 Feet Tall" (music video)	UK Singles Chart: 46	
"From Your Favourite Sky"	The Echo Label	Download	21 March 2004	1. "From Your Favourite Sky"; 2. "Life in a Day (Live)"; 3. "Not a Reasonable Man (Live)"; 4. "From Your Favourite Sky (Live)"		
"From Your Favourite Sky"	The Echo Label	CDS, ECSCD138	22 March 2004	1. "From Your Favourite Sky"; 2. "This House Is Haunted"; 3. "Cinders"; 4. "Deep Blue Sea"; 5. "By Myself"		Limited edition.
"From Your Favourite Sky"	The Echo Label	CDS	22 March 2004	1. "From Your Favourite Sky"; 2. "Life in a Day (Live)"; 3. "Not a Reasonable Man (Live)"; 4. "From Your Favourite Sky (Live)"; 5. "From Your Favourite Sky" (music video)		
"Proof"	The Echo Label	Download	21 June 2004	1. "Proof"; 2. "Junk Culture"; 3. "Same Deep Water as Me (live at the Ritz- Manchester)"; 4. "Proof" (music video)		
