= Natural History (I Am Kloot album) =

Studio album by I Am Kloot
- Released: 26 March 2001
- Recorded: Studio Studio, Rochdale; The Elbow Rooms, Manchester; The Big House, Manchester; Isle of Mull, Inner Hebrides
- Genre: Indie rock
- Length: 42:58
- Label: We Love You (Wall of Sound)
- Producer: Guy Garvey

I Am Kloot chronology
Natural History (2001)	I Am Kloot (2003)

Singles from Natural History
- 1. "Titanic" / "To You" Released: 15 November 1999; 2. "Twist" / "86 TV's" Released: 13 March 2000; 3. "Dark Star" Released: 26 February 2001; 4. "Morning Rain" Released: 2 July 2001

Natural History is the debut album by English rock band I Am Kloot, released to much eagerness from the British music press in 2001. The album was produced by Guy Garvey, lead singer for the Manchester-based band Elbow.

Although reaching a low chart placing outside the top 100, the band built up a dedicated and loyal fanbase through touring and promotion. The album itself is widely viewed as some of I Am Kloot's best work to date. Prior to the album's release, the band released two singles on Ugly Man Records: "Titanic"/"To You" in November 1999, and "Twist"/"86 TV's" in March 2000. The album itself spawned two further singles: "Dark Star" in February 2001, and "Morning Rain" in July 2001.

All songs written by John Harold Arnold Bramwell.

== Track listing ==
1.	"To You"	3:16
2.	"Morning Rain"	3:21
3.	"Bigger Wheels"	3:27
4.	"No Fear of Falling"	2:10
5.	"Loch"	4:33
6.	"Storm Warning"	3:58
7.	"Dark Star"	2:21
8.	"Stop"	3:55
9.	"Sunlight Hits the Snow"	2:43
10.	"Twist "	2:57
11.	"86 TV's"	2:54
12.	"Because"	7:21
	"Because" ends at minute 5:20. After 1 minute and 30 seconds of silence, begins a hidden track called "Graffiti".

The remastered 2013 edition includes three bonus tracks: "Titanic", "Over My Shoulder" and "Stand Another Drink (Proof)".

== Track listing (different running order) ==
1.	"To You"	3:16
2.	"Morning Rain"	3:21
3.	"Twist"	2:57
4.	"86 TV's"	2:56
5.	"Bigger Wheels"	3:30
6.	"Loch"	4:33
7.	"Storm Warning"	3:59
8.	"Dark Star"	2:22
9.	"Stop"	3:56
10.	"Sunlight Hits the Snow"	2:44
11.	"No Fear of Falling"	2:10
12.	"Because"	7:18
	"Because" includes a hidden track called "Graffiti".

The Japanese edition includes two bonus tracks: "Over My Shoulder" and "Titanic".

== Contributing musicians ==
- Guy Garvey: backing vocals, percussion, sound effects, harmonica, wine glasses
- Pete Turner, Craig Potter, Mark Potter and Richard Jupp: wine glasses on "Because"

== Album ratings ==
Professional ratings
Review scores
Source	Rating
The Independent	(favourable)
Allmusic	4/5 stars
NME	8/10 stars
The Guardian	4/5 stars
Yahoo! Music UK & Ireland	8/10 stars
London Evening Standard	3/5 stars

== Singles ==
title	label	format, catalog number	release date	track listing	charts	additional informations
"Titanic"/"To You"	Ugly Man Records	gramophone record 7", Ugly 16	1 November 1999 (Manchester); 15 December 1999 (the rest of the country)	"Titanic"/"To You" (double A-side)		Limited edition of 1000 copies.
"Twist"/"86 TV's"	Ugly Man Records	gramophone record 7" (red vinyl), Ugly 17	14 February 2000 (Manchester); 1 May 2000 (the rest of the country)	"Twist"/"86 TV's" (double A-side)		Limited edition.
"Twist"/"86 TV's"	We Love You	CDS, AMOUR4D	1 May 2000 (UK)	1. "Twist"; 2. "86 TV's"; 3. "86 TV's" (music video)		
"Dark Star"	We Love You	gramophone record 7", AMOUR9S	26 February 2001	A. "Dark Star"; B. "To You"	UK Singles Chart: 90	
"Dark Star"	We Love You	CDS, AMOUR9D	26 February 2001	1. "Dark Star"; 2. "To You"; 3. "Titanic"	UK Singles Chart: 90	
"Morning Rain"	We Love You	gramophone record 7", AMOUR11S	25 June 2001	A. "Morning Rain"; B. "Proof (demo)"	UK Singles Chart: 94	
"Morning Rain"	We Love You	CDS, AMOUR11D	25 June 2001	1. "Morning Rain"; 2. "Proof (demo)" 3. "Twist (Live)" (Paris, La Boule Noire, Valentine's Day 2001)	UK Singles Chart: 94	
