= The Press (York) =

Local daily newspaper from York, England

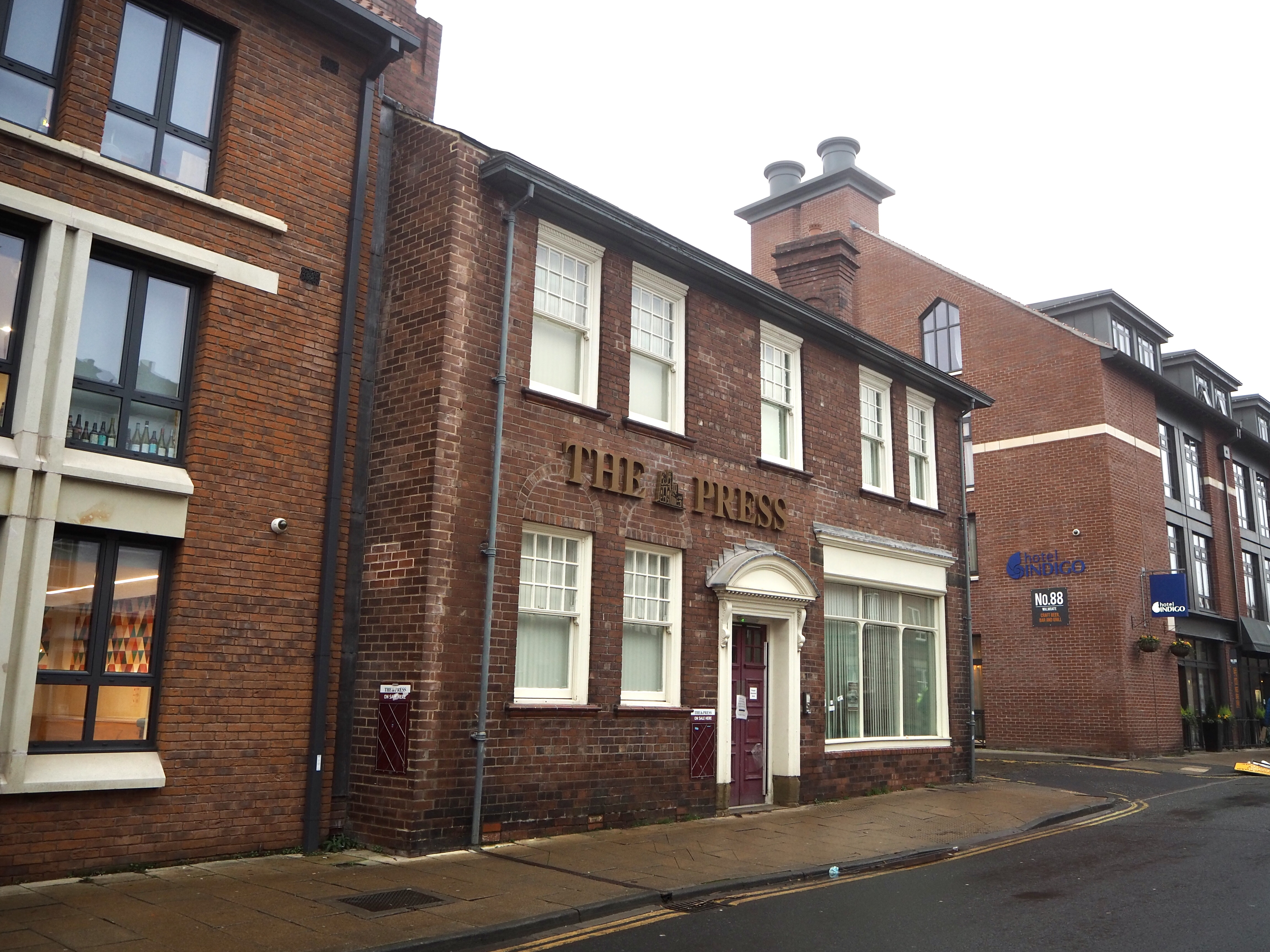
- 84–86 Walmgate
- Type: Daily newspaper
- Format: Compact
- Owner: USA Today Co.
- Founder: William Wallace Hargrove
- Publisher: Newsquest
- Editor: Ben Hardy
- Founded: 1882; 144 years ago in York
- Headquarters: 76–86 Walmgate, York
- City: York
- Country: United Kingdom
- Circulation: 4,607 (as of 2024)
- ISSN: 1757-3289
- Website: www.yorkpress.co.uk

The Press is a newspaper covering North and East Yorkshire, England It is published daily in the City of York by Newsquest Media Group Ltd, a subsidiary of Gannett Company Inc.

== History ==
The Yorkshire Evening Press was established in 1882. It changed from broadsheet to compact format in 2004 and shortly afterwards dropped "Yorkshire" from the title. Morning printing began on 24 April 2006, and the paper was given its present name.

William Wallace Hargrove printed at 9 Coney Street. Paper was delivered by barge along the River Ouse. In 1989, publication moved to Walmgate.

The Press has run campaigns including their Guardian Angels Appeal and Change It.
