= I Am Kloot =

English rock band

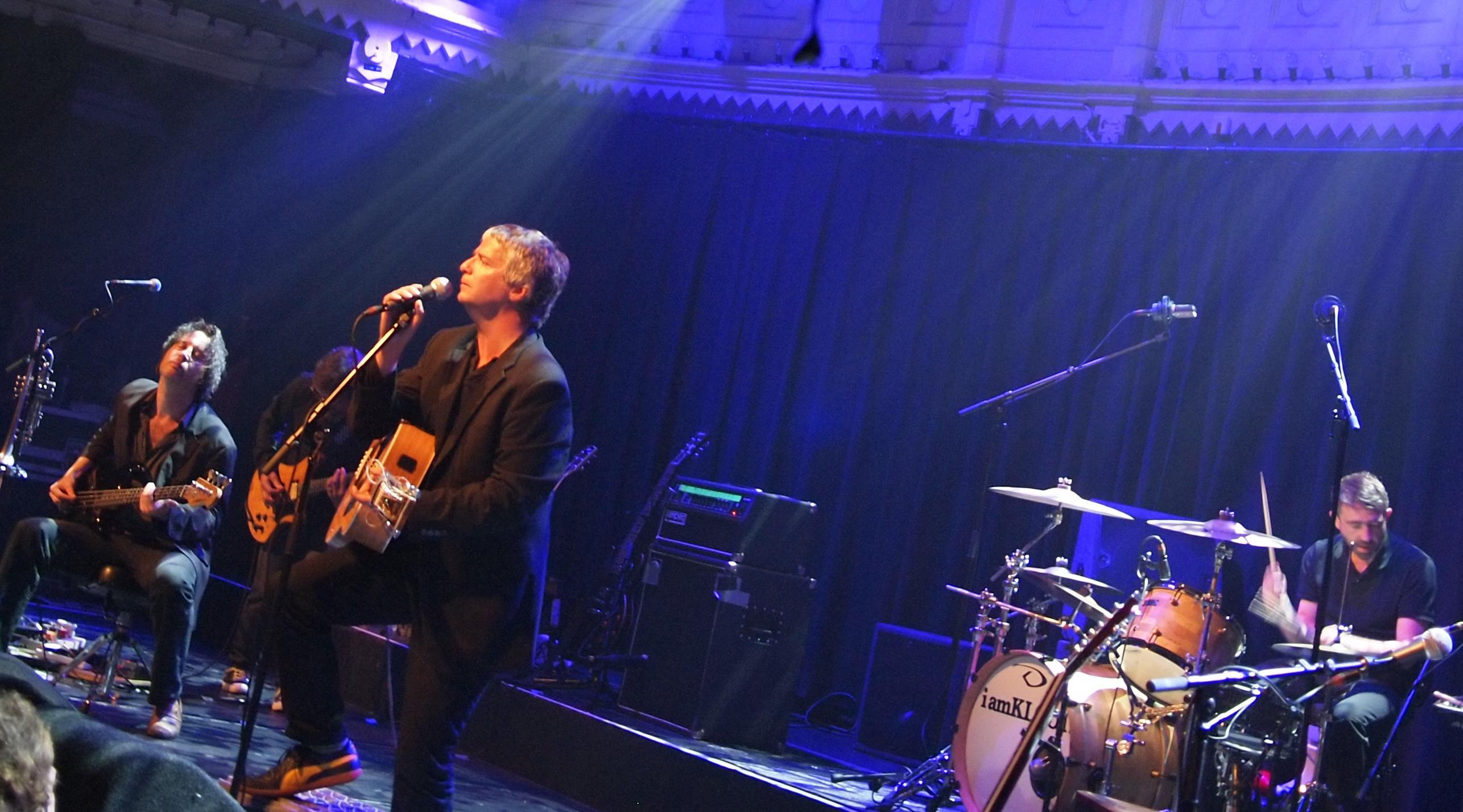
- I Am Kloot live at Paradiso, Amsterdam in 2007

Background information
- Origin: Manchester, England
- Genres: Alternative rock, post-Britpop indie rock
- Years active: 1999–2016
- Labels: Ugly Man; Wall of Sound; The Echo Label; PIAS; Skinny Dog; Walk Tall Recordings; Shepherd Moon
- Past members: John Bramwell; Peter Jobson; Andy Hargreaves
- Website: iamkloot.com

I Am Kloot were an English rock band, formed in Manchester in 1999. The band was composed of vocalist/guitarist John Bramwell, bassist Peter Jobson and drummer Andy Hargreaves.

The band released six studio albums, and was nominated for the Mercury Prize in 2010 for the album Sky at Night. The band split up in 2016, with Bramwell concentrating on a solo career.

The origin of the band name was shrouded in secrecy for the majority of the band's existence, with Bramwell stating in 2013 that the band "never said and we never will" confirm the origin of the name and joked that "If I told you, I'd have to kill you". Jobson later claimed that the name I Am Kloot was inspired by the Alan J. Pakula film Klute, and also that "I Am Kloot is a left handed card game made famous in the diaries of Jerome K. Jerome" – the rules of which are expounded in Jerome’s Three Men on the Bummel.

== History ==
I Am Kloot were formed by members of The Mouth, a band co-fronted by John Bramwell and Bryan Glancy. Bramwell, who was born and brought up in Hyde, Cheshire, had previously played with bands including The Face Brothers (a band he was kicked out of at the age of 18), The Ignition, Five Go Off To Play Guitar and The Debuchias, and performed solo as Johnny Dangerously. Peter Jobson moved from Morpeth, Northumberland to Manchester to study at Salford College (where he graduated with a BA Hons in Popular Music and Recording) and befriended Bramwell at The Night and Day Café, where they both ended up working for several years booking bands. Bramwell also ran an acoustic night at the venue called "Acoustica Mancunia" (and would continue hosting acoustic nights Gecko and Palookaville whilst the band got established). Jobson first saw Bramwell play at Castlefield Arena in central Manchester on 15 June 1996, the day of the IRA Bomb and ended up joining The Mouth who had released one single "Bang" the previous year, replacing the band's original bassist Simon Burns. The band split with Glancy after he went on holiday a week before a tour and did not return for three weeks. They began working on Bramwell's songs and changed their name to I Am Kloot.

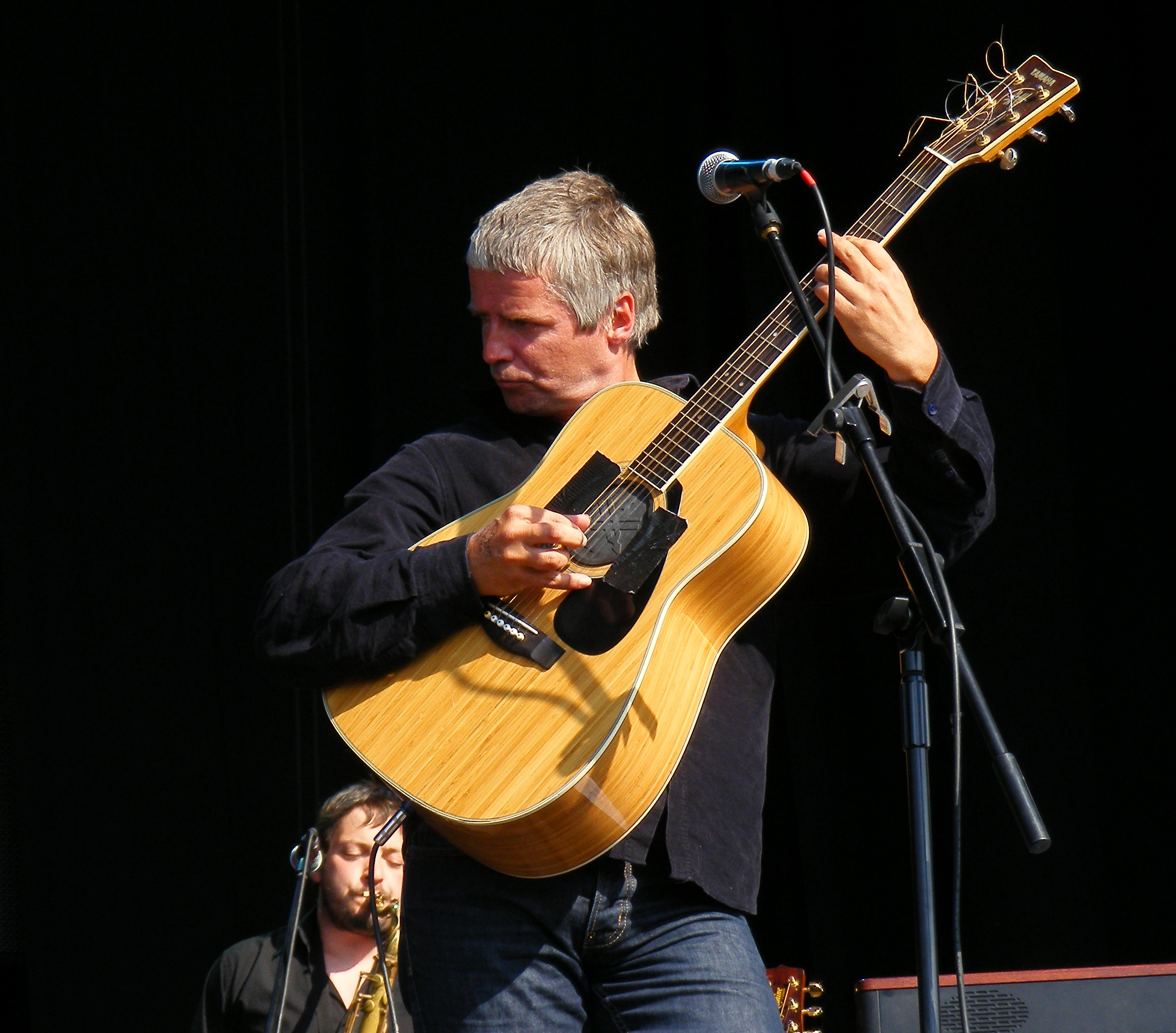
John Bramwell

The band released their debut double A-Side single "Titanic/To You" in November 1999 on local label Ugly Man Records, which was advertised around Manchester city centre with posters bearing just the lyric "there's blood on your legs, I love you" daubed in red ink, leading to complaints in the local press. Guy Lovelady, the owner of Ugly Man Records had rung Bramwell about getting one of his acts to play Night and Day, but he refused to discuss it after having fallen out with the venues owner and instead sought to get the band's debut single released on the label. Lovelady agreed without hearing any material, and did not actually hear the single until after it had been released and first saw the band play live two months later at The Kashmir Klub in London with The Libertines supporting. The band borrowed £1,000 to release the single and packaged the records in brown paper bags instead of proper sleeves to save money.

The band released their second double A-Side single "Twist/86 TV's" in March 2000 on Ugly Man before signing to Wall of Sound imprint "We Love You" to release their debut album Natural History in March 2001. Having decided against recording the album in the band's rehearsal space in Jobson's basement, it was recorded with Elbow frontman Guy Garvey in a church on the Isle of Mull. Despite being heralded by the NME as figureheads of the so-called New Acoustic Movement (although Bramwell did not want to admit to there being an acoustic scene at the time "because of the labels that immediately get attached to ‘acoustic music’"), the band returned home from touring to find the label had gone bust, owing the band money. The album went out of print in the UK, which Bramwell later described as a stalling moment for the band, but was still available in Europe due to it being distributed by a different label, so the band toured Holland, Germany and France instead of focusing on the UK.

Following two years of contractual problems, the band signed to The Echo Label and released their self-titled second album I Am Kloot in September 2003 with Bramwell stating that the band did not "fit into the current Strokes/White Stripes rock thing, so we're out on a limb again." The album was produced by Chris Potter, with Ian Broudie producing one song, "Life in a Day". Despite originally planning to release "Proof" as a single to promote the album, going as far as approving artwork and track listing, as well as commissioning a promo video starring Christopher Eccleston, it ended up not receiving a commercial release in the UK. Instead, the promo video was made available through the band's website and only received a physical release in the Benelux countries on the PIAS record label. At the time, Bramwell claimed that the single was not released properly as they "didn’t want to do any singles any more", but later admitted that the record label refused to release it.

The band released their third album Gods and Monsters in April 2005 via The Echo Label. The album was recorded at Moolah Rouge Studios in Stockport with Joe Robinson, who had previously worked with Badly Drawn Boy and Alfie. During sessions for the album, they placed microphones everywhere, commenting that they "were miking up things that were vibrating because we were playing. If you’ve got a tabletop with cups and saucers on it, it might vibrate when you play a certain note, and not when you play others. So you mike up the tabletop, and play the song, and on certain notes you get these strange sounds" and added that they "kept it sparse, not layering it up so much as adding colour". Bramwell proclaimed that "something clicked in the last 12 months, I felt as if the band had just begun, as if we'd sprung from the head of Zeus in Full body armour", yet later claimed that he "got the shakes around Gods and Monsters. I was over-thinking, not going with my instincts writing-wise".

In August 2005, the band parted ways with The Echo Label after it "became clear the label were unable to sustain the band's financial backing". It transpired that the label's parent company, the Chrysalis Group had announced a restructuring of The Echo Label after announcing a loss of over £2.0 million, resulting in a change of direction at the label and dropping many of its roster including Black Rebel Motorcycle Club and The Stands, with I Am Kloot jumping before they were pushed.

On 21 November 2005, the band released the Guy Garvey/Craig Potter produced stand-alone single "Maybe I Should" via their own label, Skinny Dog Records. The single followed a short UK tour, which saw the band play their biggest headlining shows to date, culminating with a show at the London Astoria.

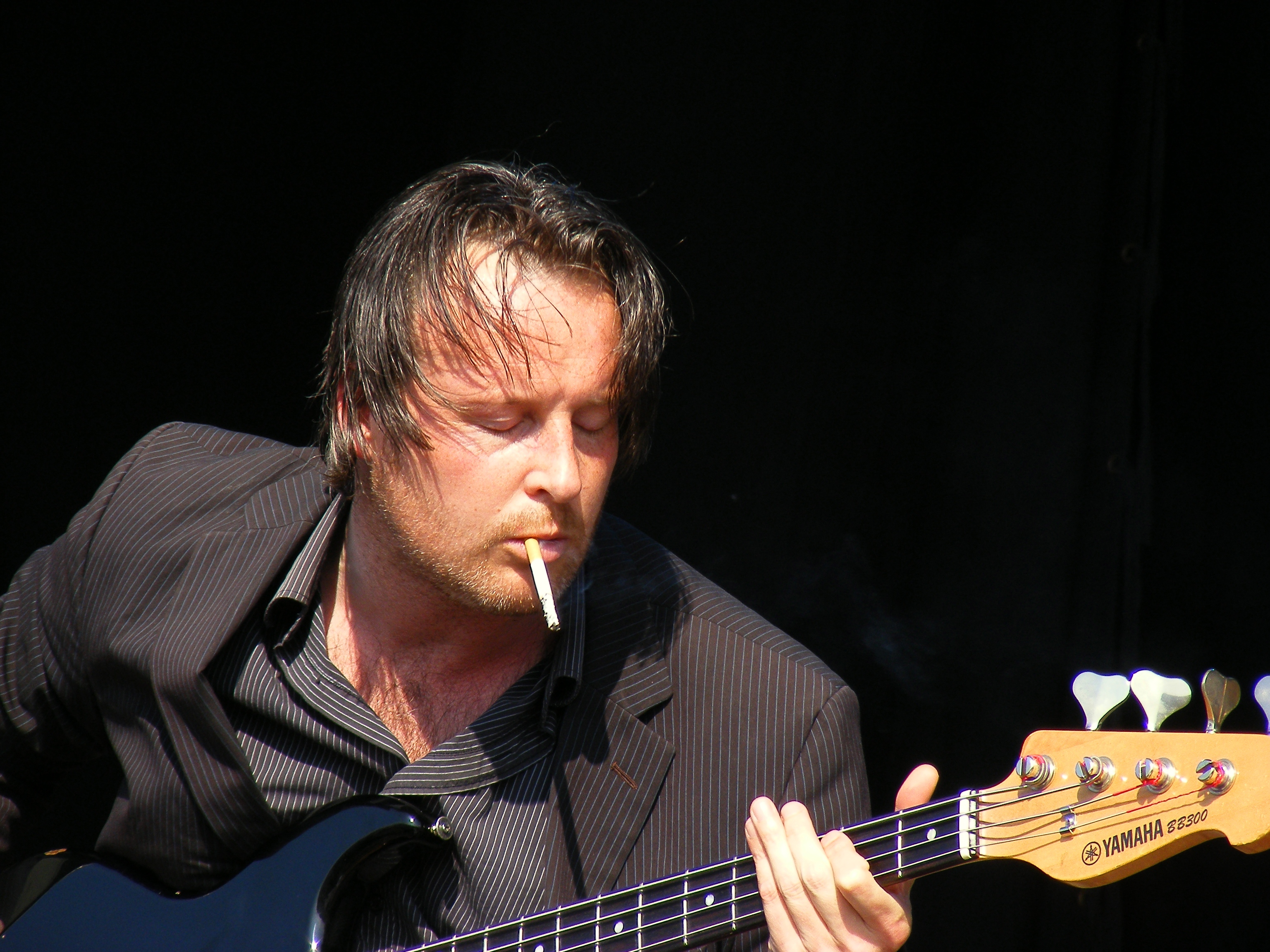
Peter Jobson

In October 2006, the band released BBC Radio 1 John Peel Sessions, a compilation of session tracks that were recorded for John Peel's BBC Radio One programme over two sessions in 2001 and 2004.

Without a record deal, the band began work on their fourth album at Moolah Rouge Studios in early 2006, with Jobson describing the recording set up in May of that year as being "quite relaxed. When it feels right we record and hopefully that mood will pervade the album" and revealed that they were working with the studios owners Colin & Norman McLeod who also played live with the band, and added that "the atmosphere in the studio with them is inspiring". The band premiered several new songs at Manchester Academy in November 2006. However, these recordings were ditched in 2007, with the band choosing to record the songs over three days live in the studio with no overdubs, treating the recording as a gig. To reflect the live nature of the recordings, the album was released as I Am Kloot Play Moolah Rouge, initially as a limited edition hand numbered 2000 copy CD in November 2007 at three shows at Manchester Academy (the same venue where they previewed some of the songs a year previous), before receiving a full commercial release through Skinny Dog Records on 14 April 2008 with an additional DVD featuring a documentary on the band from the now defunct Channel M station. The album was dedicated to former bandmate and friend Bryan Glancy who died in January 2006, with Bramwell revealing that "lots of the lyrics on the album come from conversations with Bryan". Bramwell also commented that the band "might have returned to something that we had initially, which we all think is maybe quite a good idea". It was revealed in November 2008 that film director Danny Boyle, who had used the band's song "Avenue Of Hope" on the closing credits to his film Sunshine the previous year, had approached the band to develop an original musical with them.

In October 2009, the band released a double album compilation of B-sides, rarities and previously unreleased songs under the title B.

The band released their fifth album, Sky at Night on 5 July 2010 through Shepherd Moon Records/EMI Label Services. The album was originally intended to be released in Autumn 2009, with recording sessions having begun in January that year, but was delayed due to Moolah Rouge Studios going into liquidation and disrupting recording. Album sessions were finished at Blueprint Studios in Salford and produced by Craig Potter and Guy Garvey, with Bramwell shattering his elbow at Big Hands bar on Oxford Road, Manchester whilst celebrating completion of the album. Having taken 60 days in the studio to record over a 12-month period, with long gaps in between sessions, Bramwell revealed that taking so long to record the album had meant that they had been unable to tour and were "all skint because of it". The album resulted in "the greatest sales and acclaim" of the band's career, with Jobson noting that the album "was definitely where things went up a gear, in the UK at least. We got played on the radio, which had never happened before, and then to be nominated for the Mercury was massive for a band like us – we’ve always been about word of mouth" and admitting that prior to the album being released, that "after 10 years of gigging and working hard, we basically had nothing at all - no manager, label, money, we were pretty fucked up to be honest". Bramwell described the album as "a bit of a sidestep; a one-off, single-themed, late-night, romantic LP".

The band released their sixth studio album, Let It All In on 21 January 2013, and was preceded by a live stream of the album on the Guardian website. Less orchestrated than Sky at Night, the album was recorded initially as a 3-piece, with the recordings finalised over 6 weeks with producers Garvey and Potter. On the song "Bullets" Bramwell can be heard singing with a lisp, initially claiming to have lost several teeth during a speedboat accident in the south of France, Bramwell later admitted that his teeth just started falling out. The album featured the eventual release of the song "Even The Stars", which was regularly played live prior to the release of I Am Kloot Play Moolah Rouge, but was omitted from that album. It was then set to feature on Sky At Night, with Bramwell stating that the song was "almost like a single. The thing with singles is they tend to not have all the Kloot elements in them because they’ve got too poppy. But this song has got a real hook, it’s still got a lot of the soul and ghostliness that all Kloot songs should have", but was then omitted from that album too. The version eventually released is much slower than previous versions, with Bramwell admitting that the band had "tried recording it in many different ways; I think we’ve finally found one that works in a Kloot way. There are some more exciting live versions of it that we’ve done, but when we tried recording it previously it didn’t work".

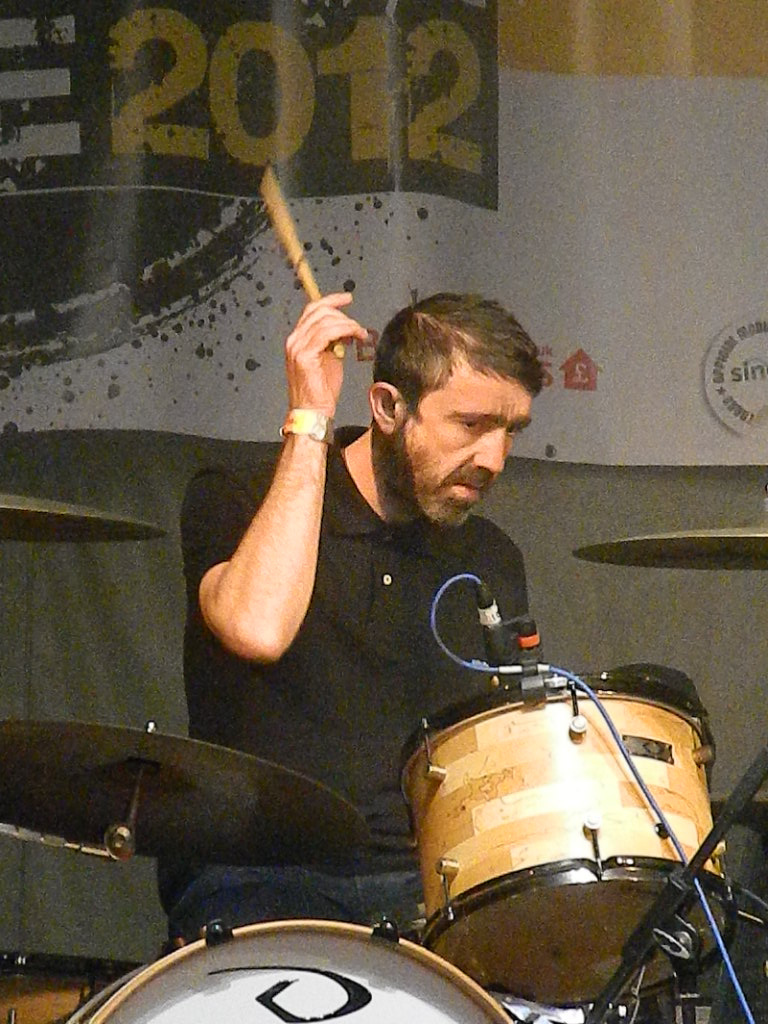
Andy Hargreaves

In May 2013, the band announced their biggest headline show to date, which was held at the O2 Apollo Manchester venue in December 2013, and fans were asked by the band to submit song requests.

In 2014, the band scored the incidental music for the BBC One television miniseries From There to Here, with the first episode aired 22 May. The soundtrack album will be released on 24 November 2014 on Caroline Records. The music was composed and recorded by the band members individually, with them not having seen each other since December 2013. In down time from the band, Jobson toured Europe with singer-songwriter Nadine Shah and Bramwell undertook a UK solo acoustic tour.

In July 2014, Jobson revealed that the band's "last 2 albums have been very elaborate and our business set up has been very corporate. Although that has brought benefits it has also distracted us from what Kloot is about. Some of the most commercially successful things we have done have been artistically and personally the most unrewarding" and added that this period had "taken its toll on our relationship. We were doing something we didn´t want to do. It took a while to find that out. We were pretty sick for a while there."

The band released the live album Hold Back the Night on 13 April 2015 via Walk Tall Recordings / PIAS.

The band performed in June 2016 as part of the 'Guy Garvey's Cultural Meltdown' at the Royal Festival Hall in London. Prior to that, the band had not played or met up together for over 12 months.

In November 2017, Bramwell revealed that the band had split up, stating that "there was no heavy break-up or anything. I just wanted to do something else. I'll never say never to getting back together but I was in I Am Kloot most of my adult life, but just as you can go to a great place on holiday year after year, sooner or later you want to go to somewhere else". He later added that "the real reason I’ve gone solo is because I started as a finger-style classical and folk guitarist. It was great to be in a band, but at the end of the day it doesn’t really work in that format. It needs to be exposed".

== Post-split ==
Bassist Pete Jobson now resides full time in London with his actor wife and his young family.

Around 2017, drummer Andy Hargreaves was playing live with singer-songwriter Matt Skinner.

John Bramwell continued his solo career. See more: John Bramwell.

The indie rock band 86tvs (Felix White, Hugo White, Will White and Jamie Morrison) is named after the song of the same name from I Am Kloot's debut album, inspired by the White brothers' love of the band in childhood.

== Awards ==
Sky at Night was shortlisted for the 2010 Barclaycard Mercury Music Prize. In response to the nomination, Bramwell stated: "I thought we'd be off people's radar enough that they wouldn't have noticed. One of the factors why they actually did pay attention to this record is the fact that Guy [Garvey] and Craig [Potter] produced it."

== Band members ==
- John Harold Arnold Bramwell (born 27 November 1964 in Hyde, Cheshire): songwriter, vocals, guitars
- Peter Alexander Jobson (born 10 November 1971 in Northumberland): bass guitar
- Andrew Peter Hargreaves (born 14 August 1969 in Clitheroe, Lancashire): drums, percussion

== Discography ==
=== Studio albums ===
- Natural History (2001) (#119 UK)
- I Am Kloot (2003) (#68 UK)
- Gods and Monsters (2005) (#74 UK, #200 FR)
- I Am Kloot Play Moolah Rouge (2007) (#74 NL)
- Sky at Night (2010) (#24 UK, #51 NL, #59 AT, #95 DE)
- Let It All In (2013) (#10 UK, #37 NL, #45 AT, #49 DE, #61 BE-VLG, #143 BE-WAL)
- From There to Here (2014, soundtrack)

=== Live albums ===
- Hold Back the Night (2015)

=== Compilations ===
- BBC Radio 1 John Peel Sessions (2006)
- B (2009)

=== Singles ===
From Natural History

- "To You"/"Titanic" (1999, Ugly Man, only 1000 vinyl copies released)
- "Twist"/"86 TV's" (2000, Ugly Man, double A-side on CD and red vinyl)
- "Dark Star" (2001, CD and vinyl) (#90 UK)
- "Morning Rain" (2001, CD and vinyl) (#94 UK)

From I Am Kloot

- "Untitled #1" (2003, limited edition vinyl) (#101 UK)
- "Life in a Day" (2003, 2×CD and vinyl) (#43 UK
- "3 Feet Tall" (2003, 2×CD and vinyl) (#46 UK)
- "From Your Favourite Sky" (2004, numbered CD and download)
- "Proof" (2004, download)

From Gods and Monsters

- "Over My Shoulder" (2005, CD and 2×vinyl) (#38 UK)
- "I Believe" (download)

From I Am Kloot Play Moolah Rouge

- "Hey Little Bird" (2008, download)

Non-album single

- "Maybe I Should" (2005, limited CD, vinyl and download) (#128 UK)

From Sky at Night

- "Northern Skies"/"Lately" (2010, download)
- "Proof" (2010, download)
- "Fingerprints" (2010, download)

From Let It All In

- "Hold Back the Night" (2012, limited edition 7" vinyl)
- "These Days Are Mine" (2013, limited edition 7" vinyl)
- "Some Better Day" (2013, promo only)
