= Crimeface =

2008 British film by Krishna Stott

- Directed by: Krishna Stott
- Written by: Richard Davis; Krishna Stott
- Produced by: Philip Shotton; Graham Clayton Chance; Krishna Stott
- Starring: Wayne Simmonds; David Crellin; Tom Charnock; Nikki Tovell; Craig Cheetham
- Cinematography: Jarod Roberts
- Edited by: Thaydon Dubois
- Music by: Bruce Magill
- Production company: Retina Circus
- Distributed by: Bellyfeel
- Release date: 2008
- Running time: 20 to 30 minutes
- Country: United Kingdom
- Language: English

Crimeface is an online interactive film thriller / police procedural released in 2008, and directed by Krishna Stott.

== Overview ==
This UK produced new media project mixes popular entertainment formats such as film, literature, music, and gaming to be both interactive and multiplatform. Crimeface has played in cinemas and is available on DVD and on the internet. The film, according to Aleks Krotoski, technology and interactivity writer at The Guardian, "pushes the notion of interactivity and play into a different game space."

The live action sequences of the film stars David Crellin (Emmerdale, BBC 2's BAFTA Award-winning series The Cops, and Coronation Street) as Detective Harry Adams of the Modern Device Crime Unit who enlists hacker Tranz Van Zandt (Wayne Simmonds) to help solve a murder. Also featuring Craig Cheetham (Peter Kay's Max & Paddy's Road to Nowhere, Hollyoaks, and Ringo Starr in the 2010 TV biopic, Lennon Naked), the story and script was written by Richard Davis and Stott.

The filmic elements are mounted in one of two windows, with the second window opening onto interactive story elements in multiple media formats, where with a click of the mouse players can explore the world of Crimeface without leaving the film. Crimeface won both the Webby and People's Voice awards prizes at the 2008 Webby Awards for the Online Film & Video - Experimental category.

== Cast ==
- Wayne Simmonds as Tranz Van Zandt
- David Crellin as Harry Adams
- Tom Charnock as John Barry
- Nikki Tovell as Julie Abrahams
- Craig Cheetham as Peter Townes
- Gareth Abel as Billy Macintosh
- Juliet Ellis as Forensic Cop
- Amanda Griffiths, Helen Serridge, and Mim Wild as Duty Cops
- Gary Peploe as Photographer

== Awards ==
Crimeface was nominated for a prize at the Viper Film Festival of Digital Media in 2006. Winner of both the Webby and People's Voice awards in the Experimental category of online film and video at the 2008 Webby Awards this new mix of film and interactivity was described on launch as being "a glimpse of the future for on-screen fiction" by Pocket-Lint.
