= John Bramwell =

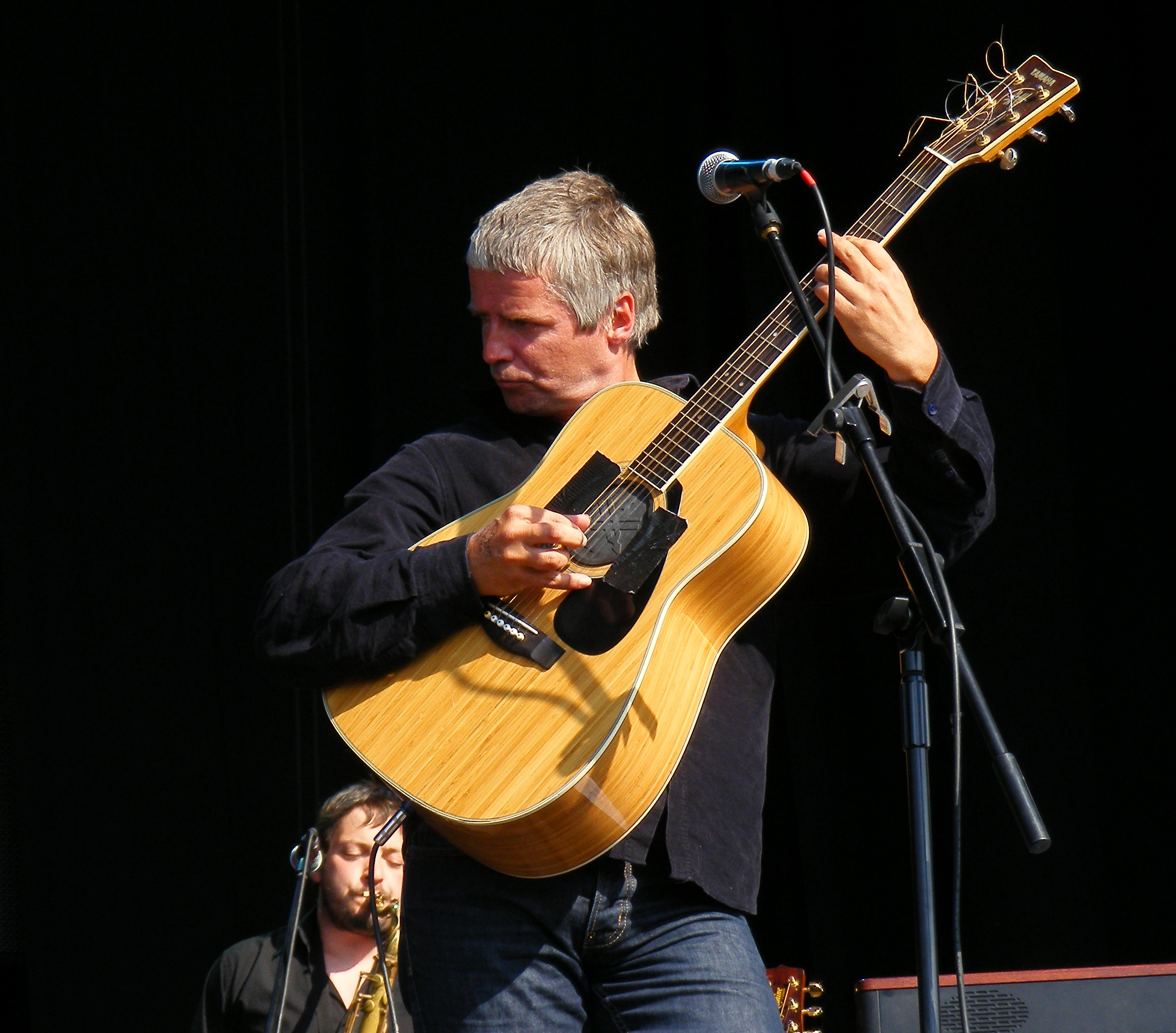
- John Bramwell performing with I Am Kloot at Chester Racecourse on 3 July 2011

Background information
- Also known as: Johnny Dangerously
- Born: John Harold Arnold Bramwell; 27 November 1964 (age 61); Hyde, Cheshire, England
- Genres: Rock, alternative rock, indie rock
- Occupation: Musician
- Instruments: Vocals, guitar
- Years active: 1988–present
- Label: Village Records
- Website: johnbramwell.com

John Harold Arnold Bramwell (born 27 November 1964 in Hyde, Cheshire) is an English singer-songwriter, best known as the frontman for the former three-piece alternative rock band I Am Kloot.

Prior to forming I Am Kloot, Bramwell had previously issued solo material under the guise of "Johnny Dangerously".

He is left-handed, but plays guitar right-handed.

== Biography ==
Bramwell was born on 27 November 1964 in Hyde, Cheshire (now part of Tameside, Greater Manchester). He grew up in Gee Cross, Hyde. In the early years, John was the front man of a four-piece band called "The Ignition" that toured in the early to late 1980s. Following that he became a solo performer and Granada Television presenter under the name Johnny Dangerously, introducing a local Saturday morning magazine programme Express! alongside Sumy Kuraishe, with this youth TV show including one of the first TV appearances for KFM Radio personality Caroline Aherne in her Mrs. Merton role. In this guise he also released You, Me and the Alarm Clock, named in The Guardian newspaper as one of "greatest albums you've never heard". He also released a single with The deBuchias.

In the early 1990s, Bramwell formed The Mouth with friend and musician Bryan Glancy (the titular Seldom Seen Kid) that later included members of I Am Kloot – Andy Hargreaves and Peter Jobson. The Mouth first played live at the Whisky a Go Go in Los Angeles, and on returning from America, Bramwell worked booking bands at Manchester venue Night & Day Café during the mid- to late-1990s.

In 1999, he formed I Am Kloot. The band released its first single "Titanic/To You" as a 7" double A-side single in 1999 and its first album Natural History in 2001 – both produced by Guy Garvey from Elbow.

== Solo discography ==
As Johnny Dangerously, Bramwell released the mini-album You, Me and the Alarm Clock in 1989. It was included in a crowd-sourced list in The Guardian newspaper as one of "the greatest albums you've never heard", a track from which was re-released as a B-side to an I Am Kloot single "Over My Shoulder".

In 2013 Bramwell contributed leading vocals for song "Measurement of Moving On" on Felix White's (The Maccabees) solo EP release titled Cosmo.

On 25 January 2014, John Bramwell released Live at The Trades – a live album available only at live shows. The recording consists of material recorded during Bramwell's concert at the Hebden Bridge Trades Club in June 2013.

In November 2016, a limited edition of signed CD single "Times Arrow" was sold at Bramwell's solo live shows, with its profits directed to Macmillan Cancer Support.

Bramwell pre-released his debut full-length debut solo album titled Leave Alone the Empty Spaces together with live album Live 2016 on 10 November 2017.

On 27 September 2019 the single "I Am the Sky" with a video starring Ben Crompton and the Newcastle dance company Ballet Lorent was released. The release was paired with a competition for fans.

The next album, called The Light Fantastic, was released on 23 February 2024. It peaked at 39 in the UK album chart a week later.
