= Elbow discography =

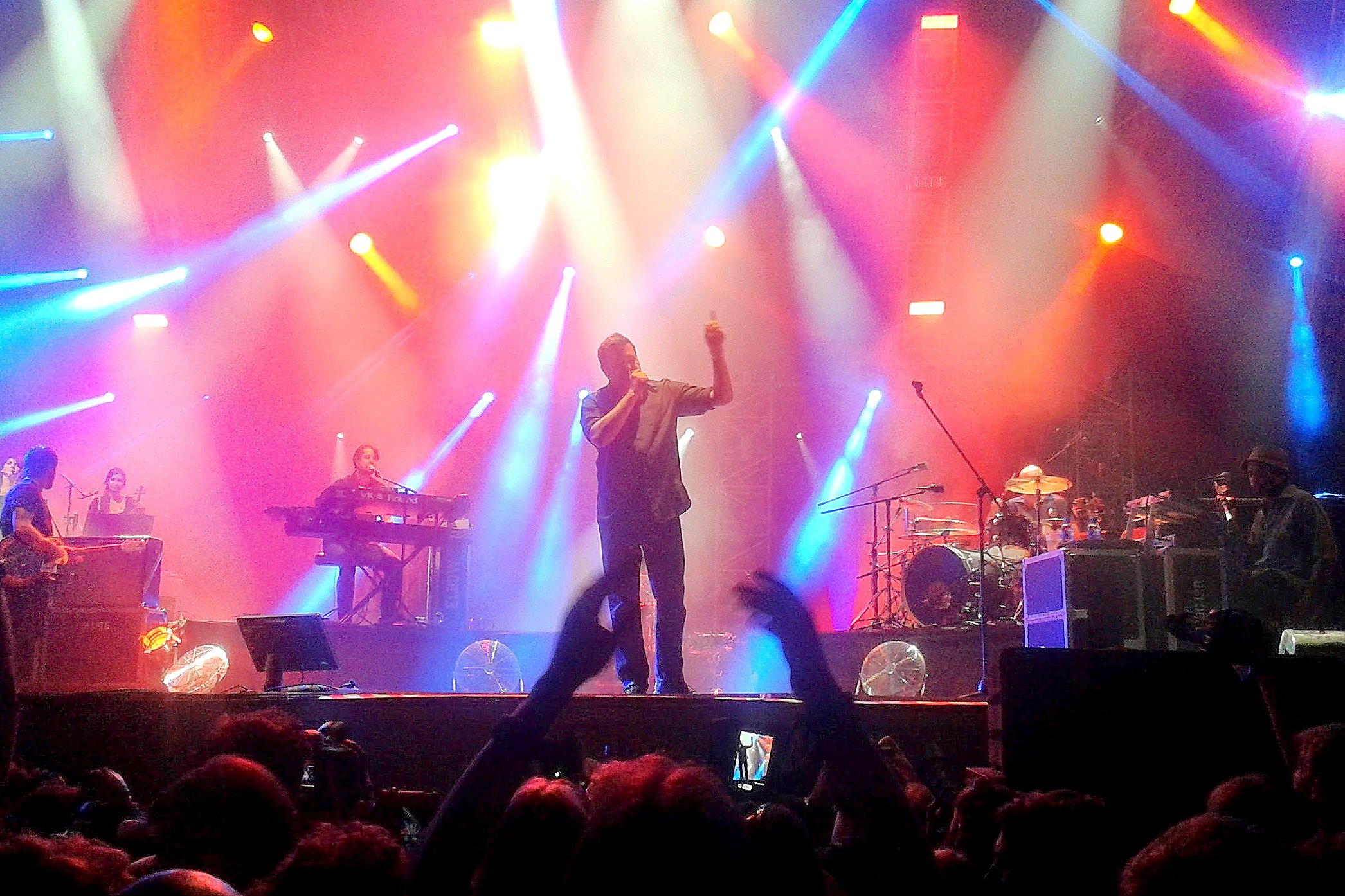
- Elbow performing live in 2014
- Studio albums: 10
- Extended plays: 5
- Live albums: 3
- Compilation albums: 2

The discography of the English rock band Elbow consists of ten studio albums and numerous EPs and singles. The band was first formed while its members were secondary school and opted for the name Elbow in 1997. The band recorded a 5-track demo EP titled Noisebox, named after the studio where it was recorded. Four songs were later re-recorded for the deluxe edition of the debut album while a live-version was chosen for the fifth. The band were signed to Island Records and recorded an album with Steve Osborne that was shelved after the Universal take-over. Released from their contract, the band released the Newborn and Any Day Now EPs through Ugly Man Records that featured some of the material recorded with Osborne. In early 2001 Elbow signed with V2 Records.

== Albums ==
=== Studio albums ===
Title	Album details	Peak chart positions										Certifications (sales thresholds)
Title	Album details	UK	AUS	BEL (FL)	BEL (WA)	GER	IRL	NL	SWI	SCO	US	Certifications (sales thresholds)
Asleep in the Back	Release date: 7 May 2001; Label: V2	14	80	—	—	—	63	—	—	33	—	UK: Gold
Cast of Thousands	Release date: 18 August 2003; Label: V2	7	— (Note: Cast of Thousands did not enter the Australian ARIA Albums Chart but peaked at number 19 on the ARIA Hitseekers Chart.)	—	—	—	52	—	—	8	196	UK: Gold
Leaders of the Free World	Release date: 12 September 2005; Label: V2	12	90	31	75	86	31	69	—	15	—	UK: Gold
The Seldom Seen Kid	Release date: 17 March 2008; Label: Fiction/Polydor	5	— (Note: The Seldom Seen Kid did not enter the Australian ARIA Albums Chart but peaked at number seven on the ARIA Hitseekers Chart.)	7	—	—	9	39	—	7	109	UK: 3× Platinum; BE: Gold; IRE: Platinum
Build a Rocket Boys!	Release date: 7 March 2011; Label: Fiction/Polydor	2	13	3	47	50	2	5	54	2	151	UK: Platinum
The Take Off and Landing of Everything	Release date: 10 March 2014; Label: Fiction/Polydor	1	12	1	15	22	1	4	30	1	83	UK: Gold
Little Fictions	Release date: 3 February 2017; Label: Polydor	1	16	3	28	19	1	1	23	1	172	UK: Gold
Giants of All Sizes	Release date: 11 October 2019; Label: Polydor	1	60	5	38	32	6	10	27	1	— (Note: Giants of All Sizes did not enter the US Billboard 200, but peaked at number 31 on the US Top Album Sales Chart.)	UK: Silver
Flying Dream 1	Release date: 19 November 2021; Label: Polydor	7	—	26	125	50	39	16	41	8	—	
Audio Vertigo	Release date: 22 March 2024; Label: Polydor	1	—	7	126	35	28	5	24	2	—	
"—" denotes albums that did not chart.

=== Compilation albums ===
Title	Album details	Peak chart positions								Certifications (sales thresholds)
Title	Album details	UK	AUS	BEL (FL)	BEL (WA)	GER	IRE	NL	SCO	Certifications (sales thresholds)
Dead in the Boot	Release date: 28 August 2012; Label: Fiction/Polydor	4	52	3	85	94	10	11	7	UK: Silver
The Best of Elbow	Release date: 24 November 2017; Label: Polydor	11	—	41	—	—	30	45	17	UK: Gold
"—" denotes albums that did not chart.

=== Live albums ===
Title	Album details	Peak chart positions		
Title	Album details	UK	BEL (FL)	SCO
Live at Jodrell Bank	Release date: 25 November 2013; Label: Fiction	—	—	—
Live at the Ritz: An Acoustic Performance	Release date: 17 April 2020; Label: Polydor	58	46	11
Elbowrooms	Release date: 19 June 2020; Label: Polydor	—	—	—
"—" denotes albums that did not chart.

== Extended plays ==
Title	EP details	Peak chart positions	
Title	EP details	UK	UK Indie
The Noisebox EP	Release date: 1 January 1999; Label: Ugly Man	—	—
The Newborn EP	Release date: 7 August 2000; Label: Ugly Man	— (Note: The Newborn EP did not enter the UK Albums Chart, but peaked at number eight on the UK Budget Albums Chart.)	46
The Any Day Now EP	Release date: 23 January 2001 CD (4 tracks) 26 January 2001 CD (5 tracks); Label: Ugly Man, V2	— (Note: The Any Day Now EP did not enter the UK Albums Chart, but peaked at number one on the UK Budget Albums Chart.)	7
iTunes Live from London EP	Release date: 12 June 2008; Label: Fiction / Polydor	194	—
Lost Worker Bee EP	Release date: 24 July 2015; Label: Polydor	—	—
Audio Vertigo Echo	Release date: 6 June 2025; Label: Polydor / Geffen	—	—
"—" denotes albums that did not chart.

== Singles ==
Title	Year	Peak chart positions										Certifications	Album
Title	Year	UK	BEL (FL)	BEL (WA)	EU	FRA	ICE	IRE	NL	SCO	US AAA	Certifications	Album
"Red"	2001	36	—	—	—	—	—	—	—	51	—		Asleep in the Back
"Powder Blue"	2001	41	—	—	—	—	—	—	—	62	—		Asleep in the Back
"Newborn"	2001	42	—	—	—	—	—	—	—	62	—		Asleep in the Back
"Asleep in the Back" / "Coming Second"	2002	19	—	—	—	—	—	—	—	25	—		Asleep in the Back
"Ribcage"	2003	—	—	—	—	—	—	—	—	—	—		Cast of Thousands
"Fallen Angel"	2003	19	—	—	—	—	—	—	—	24	—		Cast of Thousands
"Fugitive Motel"	2003	44	—	—	—	—	—	—	—	35	—		Cast of Thousands
"Not a Job"	2004	26	—	—	—	—	—	—	—	30	—		Cast of Thousands
"Grace Under Pressure" / "Switching Off"	2004	— (Note: "Grace Under Pressure" / "Switching Off" did not enter the UK Singles Chart, but peaked at number five on the UK Budget Albums Chart.)	—	—	—	—	—	—	—	—	—		Cast of Thousands
"Forget Myself"	2005	22	—	—	—	—	—	—	—	25	—		Leaders of the Free World
"Leaders of the Free World"	2005	53	—	—	—	—	—	—	—	43	—		Leaders of the Free World
"Grounds for Divorce"	2008	19	—	—	—	—	—	39	—	10	—	UK: Gold	The Seldom Seen Kid
"One Day Like This"	2008	4	19	—	11	—	—	18	—	7	—	UK: 3× Platinum	The Seldom Seen Kid
"The Bones of You"	2008	—	— (Note: "The Bones of You" did not enter the Flanders Ultratop 50, but charted at 13 on the Flanders Ultratip chart.)	—	—	—	—	—	—	—	—		The Seldom Seen Kid
"Running to Stand Still"	2009	121	—	—	—	—	—	—	—	—	—		War Child Presents Heroes
"Neat Little Rows"	2011	108	— (Note: "Neat Little Rows" did not enter the Flanders Ultratop 50, but charted at 36 on the Flanders Ultratip chart.)	—	—	—	—	—	—	—	—		Build a Rocket Boys!
"Open Arms"	2011	58	47	—	—	—	—	—	—	61	—		Build a Rocket Boys!
"Lippy Kids"	2011	— (Note: "Lippy Kids" did not enter the UK Singles Chart, but peaked at number eight on the UK Physical Singles Chart.)	— (Note: "Lippy Kids" did not enter the Flanders Ultratop 50, but charted at 20 on the Flanders Ultratip chart.)	—	—	—	—	—	36	—	—		Build a Rocket Boys!
"Dear Friends"	2011	—	— (Note: "Dear Friends" did not enter the Flanders Ultratop 50, but charted at 25 on the Flanders Ultratip chart.)	—	—	—	—	—	—	—	—		Build a Rocket Boys!
"The Night Will Always Win"	2011	—	— (Note: "The Night Will Always Win" did not enter the Flanders Ultratop 50, but charted at 25 on the Flanders Ultratip chart.)	—	—	—	—	—	—	—	—		Build a Rocket Boys!
"Lippy Kids" (Live At Rock Werchter 2011)	2011	—	6	— (Note: "Lippy Kids" (Live At Rock Werchter 2011) did not enter the Wallonie Ultratop 50, but peaked at number 21 on the Wallonie Ultratip chart.)	—	—	—	—	—	—	—		Non-album single
"McGreggor"	2012	— (Note: "McGreggor" did not enter the UK Singles Chart, but peaked at number 20 on the UK Physical Singles Chart.)	—	—	—	—	—	—	—	—	—		Dead in the Boot
"First Steps"	2012	—	—	—	—	—	—	—	—	—	—		Non-album single
"New York Morning"	2014	130	37	— (Note: "New York Morning" did not enter the Wallonie Ultratop 50, but peaked at number 35 on the Wallonie Ultratip chart.)	—	—	—	—	—	—	28		The Take Off and Landing of Everything
"Fly Boy Blue/Lunette"	2014	183	—	—	—	—	—	—	—	—	—		The Take Off and Landing of Everything
"Charge"	2014	— (Note: "Charge" did not enter the UK Singles Chart, but peaked at number 24 on the UK Physical Singles Chart.)	—	—	—	—	—	—	—	—	—		The Take Off and Landing of Everything
"My Sad Captains"	2014	—	— (Note: "My Sad Captains" did not enter the Flanders Ultratop 50, but charted at 15 on the Flanders Ultratip chart.)	—	—	—	—	—	—	—	—		The Take Off and Landing of Everything
"Real Life (Angel)"	2014	—	— (Note: "Real Life (Angel)" did not enter the Flanders Ultratop 50, but charted at 49 on the Flanders Ultratip chart.)	—	—	—	—	—	—	—	—		The Take Off and Landing of Everything
"What Time Do You Call This?"	2015	—	— (Note: "What Time Do You Call This?" did not enter the Flanders Ultratop 50, but charted at 58 on the Flanders Ultratip chart.)	—	—	—	—	—	—	—	—		Man Up OST
"Lost Worker Bee"	2015	123	—	—	—	—	—	—	—	74	—		Lost Worker Bee EP
"Magnificent (She Says)"	2016	97	— (Note: "Magnificent (She Says)" did not enter the Flanders Ultratop 50, but charted at eight on the Flanders Ultratip chart.)	— (Note: "Magnificent (She Says)" did not enter the Wallonie Ultratop 50, but charted as an "extra tip" on the Wallonie Ultratip chart.)	—	140	—	—	— (Note: "Magnificent (She Says)" never entered the Single Top 100, but peaked at number 30 on its extension, the Single Tip chart.)	47	—		Little Fictions
"All Disco"	2017	—	— (Note: "All Disco" did not enter the Flanders Ultratop 50, but charted as an "extra tip" on the Flanders Ultratip chart.)	—	—	—	—	—	—	—	—		Little Fictions
"Gentle Storm"	2017	—	— (Note: "Gentle Storm" did not enter the Flanders Ultratop 50, but charted at 33 on the Flanders Ultratip chart.)	— (Note: "Gentle Storm" did not enter the Wallonie Ultratop 50, but charted as an "extra tip" on the Wallonie Ultratip chart.)	—	—	—	—	—	—	—		Little Fictions
"August & September"	2017	— (Note: "August & September" did not enter the UK Singles Chart, but peaked at number 15 on the UK Physical Singles Chart.)	—	—	—	—	—	—	—	—	—		Non-album singles
"Kindling (Fickle Flame)"	2017	—	—	—	—	—	16	—	—	—	—		Non-album singles
"Golden Slumbers"	2017	29	— (Note: "Golden Slumbers" did not enter the Flanders Ultratop 50, but charted at 10 on the Flanders Ultratip chart.)	—	—	—	5	—	—	10	—		The Best of Elbow
"Dexter & Sinister"	2019	— (Note: "Dexter & Sinister" did not enter the UK Singles Chart, but peaked at number 38 on the UK Single Sales Chart.)	— (Note: "Dexter & Sinister" did not enter the Flanders Ultratop 50, but charted as an "extra tip" on the Flanders Ultratip chart.)	—	—	—	—	—	—	33	—		Giants of All Sizes
"Empires"	2019	—	— (Note: "Empires" did not enter the Flanders Ultratop 50, but charted at 31 on the Flanders Ultratip chart.)	— (Note: "Empires" did not enter the Wallonie Ultratop 50, but charted as an "extra tip" on the Wallonie Ultratip chart.)	—	—	—	—	—	—	—		Giants of All Sizes
"White Noise White Heat"	2019	— (Note: "White Noise White Heat" did not enter the UK Singles Chart, but peaked at number 89 on the UK Single Sales Chart.)	— (Note: "White Noise White Heat" did not enter the Flanders Ultratop 50, but charted as an "extra tip" on the Flanders Ultratip chart.)	—	—	—	—	—	—	75	—		Giants of All Sizes
"My Trouble"	2020	—	— (Note: "My Trouble" did not enter the Flanders Ultratop 50, but charted at 28 on the Flanders Ultratip chart.)	—	—	—	—	—	—	—	—		Giants of All Sizes
"The Seldom Seen Kid"	2021	—	—	—	—	—	—	—	—	—	—		Flying Dream 1
"Six Words"	2021	—	—	—	—	—	—	—	—	—	—		Flying Dream 1
"Flying Dream 1"	2021	—	—	—	—	—	—	—	—	—	—		Flying Dream 1
"What Am I Without You"	2022	—	—	—	—	—	—	—	—	—	—		Flying Dream 1
"Lovers' Leap"	2024	— (Note: "Lovers' Leap" did not enter the UK Singles Chart, but peaked at number 49 on the UK Single Sales Chart.)	—	—	—	—	—	—	—	—	—		Audio Vertigo
"Balu"	2024	—	—	—	—	—	—	—	—	—	—		Audio Vertigo
"Good Blood Mexico City"	2024	—	—	—	—	—	—	—	—	—	—		Audio Vertigo
"Things I've Been Telling Myself for Years"	2024	—	—	—	—	—	—	—	—	—	—		Audio Vertigo
"Sober"	2025	— (Note: "Sober" did not enter the UK Singles Chart, but peaked at number 97 on the UK Single Sales Chart.)	—	—	—	—	—	—	—	—	—		Audio Vertigo Echo
"Dis-Graceland 463-465 Bury New Road"	2025	— (Note: "Dis-Graceland 463-465 Bury New Road" did not enter the UK Singles Chart, but peaked at number four on the UK Single Sales Chart.)	—	—	—	—	—	—	—	—	—		Audio Vertigo Echo
"—" denotes singles that did not chart.

== Other charted songs ==
Title	Year	Peak chart positions		Album
Title	Year	UK Sales	BEL (FL) Tip	Album
"Any Day Now"	2001	50	—	Asleep in the Back
"Weather to Fly"	2008	—	14	The Seldom Seen Kid
"—" denotes songs that did not chart.

== Cover versions ==
- "Golden Slumbers" (originally by The Beatles) released on Elbow's The Best Of in 2017
- "August & September" (originally by The The) released for Record Store Day 2017
- "Mercy Street" (originally by Peter Gabriel) released on And I'll Scratch Yours in 2013
- "Working Class Hero" (originally by John Lennon) released on Q Magazine compilation Lennon Covered in 2005
- "Running to Stand Still" (originally by U2) released on War Child Presents Heroes compilation in 2009
