= Best =

Best or The Best may refer to:

== Companies and organizations ==
- Best & Co., an 1879–1971 clothing chain
- Best Lock Corporation, a lock manufacturer
- Best Manufacturing Company, a farm machinery company
- Best Products, a chain of catalog showroom retail stores
- Brihanmumbai Electric Supply and Transport, a public transport and utility provider
- Best High School (disambiguation)
- Best Denki, a Japanese electronics retailer

== Acronyms ==
- Berkeley Earth Surface Temperature, a project to assess global temperature records
- BEST Robotics, a student competition
- BioEthanol for Sustainable Transport
- Bootstrap error-adjusted single-sample technique, a statistical method
- Bringing Examination and Search Together, a European Patent Office initiative
- Bronx Environmental Stewardship Training, a program of the Sustainable South Bronx organization
- Smart BEST, a Japanese experimental train
- Brihanmumbai Electric Supply and Transport, in Mumbai, India
- BEST (tokamak), a Chinese fusion experiment

== Film and television ==
- Best (film), a 2000 George Best biopic
- The Best (TV series), a 2002 British cooking programme
- Best: His Mother's Son, a 2009 made-for-TV drama about George Best's mother

== Music ==
=== Albums ===
- Best (After School album), 2015
- Best (Akina Nakamori album), 1986
- Best (Garnet Crow album), 2005
- Best (High and Mighty Color album), 2008
- Best (Kenny G album), 2006
- Best (Mika Nakashima album), 2005
- Best (Robert Earl Keen album), 2006
- Best! (Jellyfish album), 2006
- A Best, by Ayumi Hamasaki, 2001
- The Best (Ai album), 2015
- The Best (Ana Gabriel album), 1992
- The Best (Ariana Grande album), 2017
- The Best (Bonnie Tyler album) or the 1988 title song (see below), 1993
- The Best (Dan Seals album), 1987
- The Best (David Lee Roth album), 1997
- The Best (Despina Vandi album), 2001
- The Best (Edmond Leung album), 1994
- The Best (George Clinton album), 1995
- The Best (Girls' Generation album), 2014
- The Best (James Reyne album), 1992
- The Best (Janet Jackson album) or Number Ones, 2009
- The Best (Leo Kottke album), 1976
- The Best (t.A.T.u. album), 2006
- The Best (Yōko Oginome album), 1985
- The Best (video), by Bonfire, 1993
- Aya Matsuura Best 1, 2005
- Best... I, by the Smiths, 1992
- ...Best II, by the Smiths, 1992
- Best 1991–2004, by Seal, 2004
- Best: Bounce & Lovers, by Koda Kumi, 2007
- Best: Fan's Selection, by X Japan, 2001
- Best: First Things, by Koda Kumi, 2005
- Best: Second Session, by Koda Kumi, 2006
- Best: The Greatest Hits of S Club 7, 2003
- Best: Third Universe, by Koda Kumi, 2010
- Best! Morning Musume 1, 2001
- Best! Morning Musume 2, 2004
- Best! Morning Musume 20th Anniversary, 2019
- The Best!: Updated Morning Musume, 2013
- The Best '03–'09, by Yuko Ando, 2009
- The Best: Make the Music Go Bang!, by X, 2004
- The Best: Sittin' in Again, by Loggins and Messina, 2005
- Best, by the Clark Sisters, 1986

=== Songs ===
- "The Best" (song), by Bonnie Tyler, 1988; covered by Tina Turner, 1989
- "The Best", by …And You Will Know Us by the Trail of Dead from Worlds Apart, 2005
- "The Best", by Anthony Ramos from the soundtrack of the film Space Jam: A New Legacy, 2021
- "The Best", by Awolnation from Angel Miners & the Lightning Riders, 2020
- "Best", by Gracie Abrams from Good Riddance, 2023

=== Performers ===
- The Best (band), a music supergroup featuring Keith Emerson, John Entwistle, and others
- Best (band), now known as Mclusky

== People ==
- Best (surname), including people with the surname Best
- Best (footballer) (born 1968), retired Portuguese footballer

== Other uses ==
- .best, an Internet top-level domain
- The Best FIFA Football Awards
- Best, Netherlands, a municipality in the southern Netherlands
- Best bitter, a type of beer
- Best disease, a disease of the eye
- The Best (PlayStation), PlayStation budget range in Japan
- Best (women's magazine), a UK weekly woman's magazine
- Best (music magazine), a French popular music magazine

== See also ==
- All My Best (disambiguation)
- Best II (disambiguation)
- Das Beste (disambiguation)
