= Newborn (disambiguation) =

Newborn or new born most commonly refers to an infant, a baby in the first three months after birth depending on the sleep pattern of the baby.

Newborn or new born may also refer to:

== Music ==
- Newborn (band), Hungarian punk bank
- Newborn, unreleased album by Weerd Science
- Newborn (album), album by the James Gang
- The Newborn EP, EP by Elbow
- Newborn (Elbow song), song by Elbow
- "New Born", song by Muse
- "Newborn", the B-side of the Depeche Mode single A Pain That I'm Used To

== Other uses ==
- Newborn (surname)
- Newborn, Georgia, town in the United States
- The Newborn monument, a celebration of the 2008 Kosovo declaration of independence
- Newborn (film), a 2026 American drama film
