= My Very Best (disambiguation) =

My Very Best is a 2008 compilation album of songs by Agnetha Fältskog

- "My Very Best", song by Elbow from Leaders of the Free World 2005

== See also ==
- All My Best (disambiguation)
- The Very Best Of (disambiguation)
