= Yūko Andō =

Yūko Andō may refer to:

- Yuko Ando (singer) (born 1977), Japanese singer-songwriter
- Yūko Andō (news anchor) (born 1958), Japanese television presenter and news anchor
