= Beest =

Beest may refer to:

- Variant name of Beesd, a town in the Netherlands
- A historical verb form in English, see Thou § Conjugation

== People with the surname ==
- Hidde Van Beest (born 1979), Australian volleyball player
- Pauline te Beest (born 1970), Dutch cricketer

== See also ==
- Beast (disambiguation)
- Bees
- Beet
- Best (disambiguation)
- Wildebeest
