= The Best '03–'09 =

The Best

Greatest hits album by Yūko Andō
- Released: April 15, 2009
- Recorded: 2003–2009, re-mastered in 2009
- Genre: J-pop
- Length: 74:18 (Disc 1); 73:32 (Disc 2)
- Label: Cutting Edge

Yūko Andō chronology
Chronicle. (2008)	The Best (2009)

Alternative covers
- CD+DVD cover

The Best is Yūko Andō's first compilation album, released on April 15, 2009. It was released in two formats: 2CD and CD+DVD.

== Track listing ==
All lyrics are written by Yūko Andō.

Disc 1
No.	Title	Music	Length
1.	"Nouzenkatsura (Ripuraizu) (のうぜんかつら（リプライズ）, Trumpet Vine (Reprise))" (Gekkeikan "Tsuki" CM song)	Yūko Andō, Yamamoto Ryūji	3:12
2.	"Parareru (パラレル, Parallel)" (NTV "Ongaku Senshi Music Fighter" ending theme)	Yūko Andō, Yamamoto Ryūji	4:34
3.	"Sarī (サリー, Sally)"	Yūko Andō, Yamamoto Ryūji	5:54
4.	"Doramachikku Rekōdo (ドラマチックレコード, Dramatic Record)"	Dan Miyakawa	5:06
5.	"Wasuremono no Mori (忘れものの森, The Forest of Lost Things)" (Fuji TV anime "Gilgamesh" ending theme)	Yūko Andō	4:25
6.	"Anata to Watashi ni Dekiru Koto (あなたと私にできる事, What You and I Can Do)"	Yūko Andō	6:11
7.	"Texas"	Yūko Andō, Yamamoto Ryūji	5:18
8.	"Unabara no Tsuki (海原の月, Ocean Moon)" (Movie "Jigyaku no Uta" theme song)	Yūko Andō	7:12
9.	"The Still Steel Down"	Yūko Andō	6:02
10.	"Lost Child,"	Yūko Andō	5:57
11.	"Utai Zen'ya (唄い前夜, Singing Last Night)"	Yūko Andō	5:26
12.	"Rinjin ni Hikari ga Sasu Toki (隣人に光が差すとき, When The Light Shines On My Neighbor)"	Yūko Andō	4:45
13.	"Seija no Koushin (聖者の行進, March of the Saints)"	Yūko Andō	5:09
14.	"Hajimari no Uta (はじまりの唄, Beginning Song)"	Yūko Andō	5:33

All lyrics are written by Yūko Andō.

Disc 2
No.	Title	Music	Length
1.	"Mizuiro no Shirabe (水色の調べ, Search of the Light Blue)" (Gekkeikan "Tsuki" CM song)	Dan Miyakawa	5:01
2.	"Green Bird Finger." (NTV "Ongaku Senshi Music Fighter" ending theme)	Yūko Andō, Yamamoto Ryūji	4:38
3.	"Amauta (雨唄, Rain Song)"	Yūko Andō	4:22
4.	"Misora (み空, Beautiful Sky)"	Yūko Andō	4:10
5.	"Happy" (TV Tokyo "Japan Countdown" ending theme)	Atsushi Suemitsu	4:03
6.	"Samishigariya no Kotobatachi (さみしがり屋の言葉達, Words of the Lonely)" (Hitachi au "W32H")	Dan Miyakawa	5:28
7.	"Kemuri wa Itsumo no Seki de Haku (煙はいつもの席で吐く, I Smoke My Cigarettes At My Habitual Seat)"	Yūko Andō	4:37
8.	"Makareta Tane ni Tsuite (蒔かれた種について, About the Seeds We Sow)"	Yūko Andō	5:10
9.	"Sucre Hecacha"	Yūko Andō	5:31
10.	"Summer"	Yūko Andō	4:37
11.	"Nirakainarīrihi (ニラカイナリィリヒ)"	Yūko Andō	4:03
12.	"Saisei (再生, Playback)"	Yūko Andō	5:43
13.	"Anzen Chitai (安全地帯, Safety Zone)"	Yūko Andō	5:16
14.	"Sayonara to Kimi, Harō to Boku (さよならと君、ハローと僕, You Say Goodbye, I Say Hello)"	Yūko Andō	6:49
15.	"Rokugatsu Jūsannichi, Tsuyoi Ame. (六月十三日、強い雨。, June 13th, Hard Rain)"	Yūko Andō	2:58

DVD
No.	Title	Length
1.	"Piece" (Music Clip)
2.	"Sally" (Music Clip)
3.	"Dramatic Record" (Music Clip)
4.	"Wasuremono no Mori" (Music Clip)
5.	"Rinjin ni Hikari ga Sasu Toki" (Music Clip)
6.	"Anata to Watashi ni Dekiru Koto" (Music Clip)
7.	"Lost Child," (Music Clip)
8.	"Samishigariya no Kotobatachi" (Music Clip)
9.	"Nouzenkatsura (Reprise)" (Music Clip)
10.	"Texas" (Music Clip)
11.	"The Still Steel Down" (Music Clip)
12.	"Utai Zen'ya" (Music Clip)
13.	"Unabara no Tsuki" (Music Clip)
14.	"Parallel" (Music Clip)
15.	"Happy" (Music Clip)
16.	"Hajimari no Uta" (Music Clip)

== Charts ==
=== Oricon Sales Chart ===
Release	Chart	Peak Position	First Day/Week Sales	Sales Total	Chart Run
April 15, 2009	Oricon Daily Albums Chart	3	5,201		
April 15, 2009	Oricon Weekly Albums Chart	5	16,230	28,694+	5 weeks+
April 15, 2009	Oricon Monthly Albums Chart				
April 15, 2009	Oricon Yearly Albums Chart				

=== Physical Sales Charts ===
Chart	Peak position
Billboard Japan TOP Albums	
Soundscan Albums Chart (CD+DVD)	15
Soundscan Albums Chart (CD-Only)	17
