= Tarō Kimura =

Tarō Kimura may refer to:

- Tarō Kimura (journalist) (木村 太郎, born 1938), Japanese journalist
- Tarō Kimura (politician) (木村 太郎, 1965–2017), Japanese politician
