= Tetsuo Suda =

Japanese TV presenter and news anchor (born 1948)

Tetsuo Suda (須田 哲夫, Suda Tetsuo; born 16 January 1948) is a Japanese TV presenter and news anchor.

He was born in Shinagawa, Tokyo. Suda graduated from Keio University, and joined Fuji TV in 1971.

Since April 2000, he has worked on Fuji Television's Super News evening news programme alongside Yūko Andō.

== See also ==
- Tarō Kimura (journalist), Super News commentator
