= Asleep in the Back / Coming Second =

Single by Elbow

from the album Asleep in the Back
- B-side: "Stumble", "Puckfair"
- Released: 4 February 2002
- Recorded: 1998–2000
- Genre: Alternative rock
- Length: 3:43, 4:57
- Label: V2
- Songwriters: Guy Garvey, Elbow
- Producers: Steve Osborne, Ben Hillier, Elbow

Elbow singles chronology
"Newborn" (2001)	"Asleep in the Back / Coming Second" (2002)	"Ribcage" (2003)

"Asleep in the Back / Coming Second" is Elbow's fourth and last double A-side single off the album Asleep in the Back, released through their second record label V2 Records in five formats: two CD singles, one DVD, one 12" vinyl promo, and one 12" remix vinyl for "Coming Second". The US promo disc contained "George Lassoes the Moon" from The Noisebox EP and "None One" from The Newborn EP. The song entered the UK Singles Chart at #19

The song "Asleep in the Back" was originally not on the eponymous album, but later added on as a bonus track. The video to the song consists of moving collage pieces, including the band members performing on stage, being attacked by insects.

The video's visual style is reminiscent of Coldplay's "Don't Panic" video.

== Track listing ==
UK 12" Vinyl Promo

1. "Asleep in the Back" – 3:43
2. "Coming Second" – 4:57

US Promo CD

1. "Asleep in the Back" – 3:43
2. "George Lassoes the Moon" – 6:37
3. "None One" – 4:18

CD1

1. "Asleep in the Back" – 3:45
2. "Coming Second" – 4:57
3. "Stumble" – 3:38

CD2

1. "Asleep in the Back" – 3:45
2. "Coming Second" (Misery:Lab Remix) – 5:26
3. "Puckfair" – 3:10

DVD

1. "Coming Second" (Live at The Astoria)
2. "Asleep in the Back" (Video)
3. "Coming Second" (Fink Remix)
- Also included 4 30 second visual clips and 10 exclusive tour images

"Coming Second" 12" Remix Vinyl

1. "Coming Second" (Mish Mash Mix) – 5:48
2. "Coming Second" (El Presidente Mix "Beyond Repair") – 4:50
3. "Coming Second" (Misery: Lab Remix) – 5:24
4. "Coming Second" (Fink Remix)

== Chart performance ==
Chart (2002)	Peak position
UK Indie (OCC)	3
UK Singles (OCC)	19
