= Yuko Ando (singer) =

Japanese singer-songwriter and actress (born 1977)

Yūko Andō 安藤裕子
- Also known as: Üchary Andrew, Nee-yan
- Born: 安藤 裕子(Andō Yūko); 9 May 1977 (age 49)
- Origin: Kanagawa, Japan
- Genres: J-pop
- Occupations: Singer, songwriter, record producer, composer, actress
- Instruments: Vocals, guitar
- Years active: 1999–present
- Labels: Cutting Edge (2003–2016); Pony Canyon (2020–present); YS corporation（2003-2016） DG AGENT（2017-2019） Horipro（2019-）
- Website: Andrew Page

Yūko Andō (安藤 裕子, Andō Yūko) (born 9 May 1977) is a Japanese singer-songwriter and former actress. Andō is part of the Horipro talent agency.

== Biography ==
=== Early life and career ===
Born in Kanagawa Prefecture, as a child, music was never a special hobby of Andō; rather she had more of an interest towards drawing. During her college years, driven by her strong interest in creating things, Andō decided to pursue a film making career. However, unable to catch a break with the studios, she then followed her friends and family's advice to join a talent agency in hopes of becoming an actor. This landed her a few spots as an extra in TV dramas.

One of the auditions for a play she passed during her Junior year at Ferris University required her to sing on stage. At that time, one of the evaluators was Oricon music charts founder Sōkō Koike and by his recommendation, she decided to pursue a career as a singer-songwriter.

Before debuting as a singer, Andō appeared as a regular in the popular TV drama "Ikebukuro West Gate Park" (2000) and the 1999 movie "Saimin".

=== Debut and success ===
In 2002, Andō sent film director Yukihiko Tsutsumi, whom she had gotten to know on the set of "Ikebukuro West Gate Park" a demo tape of "Rinjin ni Hikari ga Sasu Toki". Upon hearing her demo, Tsutsumi decided he had to include it in the movie he was then directing, 2LDK, as ending theme. She was credited as Yuuko Ando (安藤ゆう子).

In July 2003, Andō debuted under the Avex-owned sub-label, Cutting Edge, with the mini album "Sally". That same year she performed live for the first time at a convention concert held for Avex shareholders.

In November 2005, Andō's "Nouzenkatsura (Reprise)" was used in Gekkeikan's commercial for the "Tsuki" liquor. Because Andō was not credited in the actual commercial, the company was flooded with inquiries from people wanting to know the name of the singer, who for a period was confused to be Clammbon's Ikuko Harada. The song, based on a poem written by her grandmother over the loss of her husband, propelled Andō's second full album, Merry Andrew into the Top 10. The album was certified gold with over 100,000 copies sold. Following the success of the song, Andō was branded by the media as the "late-blooming princess" and "singer-songwriter of the next generation".

In December 2006, Andō embarked on her first live tour.

In April 2009, she released her first compilation album which featured a variety of songs handpicked by Andō herself. That same year, she wrote and performed the ending theme song, "Paxmaveiti", for the Nintendo DS video game Professor Layton and the Last Specter. On 8 August 2010, she appeared at the World Happiness 2010 rock festival in Tokyo.

== Artistry ==
=== Recording process ===
Andō writes and composes almost all of her songs, except for the occasional covers and collaborations with other artists. Andō's recording process consists of writing lyrics and composing melodies which she then records a cappella and passes over to Ryūji Yamamoto who is responsible for all her songs' arrangements. Yamamoto arranges Ando's demos based on these recordings. Pre-production meetings are held with Yamamoto, Andō and her producer, Yuji Andō, where they decide on the final direction for a track and select the musicians for the recording.

=== Influences ===
Like many other singer-songwriters before her, Ando's greatest influence is Chara, whom she first discovered through a friend in high school. For her big audition at Avex, Andō sang Chara's "Break These Chain". Another artist Andō listens to and lists as influence is Naoko Ken. Her lyrics tend to have happy endings. This has also been remarked in an interview by movie director and friend Yukihiko Tsutsumi, when he called her a "big happy end freak". Another influence is Yellow Magic Orchestra, whose 1983 song "Kimi ni Mune Kyun" she covered in her 2009 record Paxmaveiti.

=== Collaborations ===
In recent years, Andō has started composing and writing for other artists, such as Yui Aragaki and Hisayo Inamori, as well as collaborating with them on her own songs. Andō also often records covers of songs from the 70's and 80's for her singles which she calls the "serious adult covers series".

== Character ==
- Since her debut, Andō has been blogging on her official website under the name of "Nee-yan", which her staff and fans have adopted as a nickname for her.
- She has a hard time managing stress and pressure and is said to often feel ill and nervous before going on stage. She enjoys performing however dislikes MC-ing.
- The only instrument she can play is the basic rhythm guitar.
- On her radio show, she is known for answering her listeners' questions in a very direct and honest manner.
- Ever since her debut, Andō has taken charge of her own make-up and styling. This has appealed to female fans and landed her many fashion magazine gigs.
- On her first appearance on the Music Station television program, she revealed she that prefers staying indoors and seldom leaves her home.
- Andō takes part in the creative process for many of her music videos and has collaborated with many directors on MVs such as "Sally", "Dramatic Record", "Wasuremono no Mori", "Rinjin ni Hikari ga Sasu Toki" and "Utai Zen'ya". She also draws many of her CD covers, for which she is credited as Üchary Andrew.
- As a child she loved watching the Kon Ichikawa directed "Kosuke Kindaichi" series and since then has been a fan of novelist Seishi Yokomizo's work, to the point of creating a special corner called "Yokomizo Seishi no Nazo wo Toke." (横溝正史の謎を解け。, Solve the Yokomizo Seishi Mystery.) on her J-Wave radio show "Oh! My Radio" .
- She attended the same middle and high school as fellow singer-songwriter Hitoto Yo.
- Yukihiko Tsutsumi is often seen at her concerts and has branded her the "best female singer of the last few years" on his blog.
- She is allergic to crustaceans and therefore does not eat lobster or crab. She also dislikes bananas.
- She often cuts her hair haphazardly, which she ends up regretting most of the time.
- When driving her car, she gets angry easily, and when she is, she switches to the Kansai dialect, which she was brought up speaking.
- She dreams of one day building a home where she can live happily with her family.
- On the morning show "Mezamashi TV", she commented on sharing the same name pronunciation as news anchor Yūko Andō, saying "I feel inexcusable for having the same name as such a well-rounded person, (compared) I'm a pretty useless human being".
- In May 2011, she announced that she was pregnant with her first child on her official blog. Ando announced the birth of the child in the October of the same year.

== Discography ==
=== Studio albums ===
#	Information	Weekly Albums Charts	Sales
1st	Middle Tempo Magic: Released: 8 September 2004	64	—N/a
2nd	Merry Andrew: Released: 25 January 2006; Chart Run: 13 weeks	10	30,000 copies
3rd	shabon songs: Released: 14 February 2007; Chart Run: 6 weeks	6	30,000 copies
4th	chronicle.: Released: 21 May 2008; Chart Run: 7 weeks	11	32,217 copies
5th	JAPANESE POP: Released: 8 September 2010; Chart Run: 7 weeks	10	18,000 copies
6th	Kanchigai: Japanese Title: 勘違い; Released: 28 March 2012; Chart Run: 4 weeks	16	—N/a
7th	Good-Bye: Released: 2 October 2013; Chart Run: 4 weeks	13	6,559 copies
8th	Anata ga Neteru Aida ni: Japanese Title: あなたが寝てる間に; Released: 28 January 2015; Chart Run: 4 weeks	29	—N/a
9th	Itadaki Mono: Japanese Title: 頂き物; Released: 2 March 2016; Chart Run: 3 weeks	21	—N/a
10th	Italan: Released: 27 June 2018; Chart Run: 2 weeks	58	—N/a
11th	Barometz: Released: 26 August 2020; Chart Run: 2 weeks	44	—N/a
12th	Kongtong Recordings: Released: 17 November 2021; Chart Run: 1 weeks	47	—N/a

=== Mini albums ===
1. Sally (9 July 2003)
2. And Do, Record. (28 January 2004)
3. Acoustic Tempo Magic. (12 March 2014)

=== Cover albums ===
1. Otona no Majime na Cover Series (2 March 2011)

=== Compilation albums ===
1. The Best '03-'09 (15 April 2009)

=== Singles ===
Year	Information	Weekly Singles Chart	Album
2004	Mizuiro no Shirabe: Japanese Title: 水色の調べ; Released: 23 June 2004	139	Middle Tempo Magic
2005	Anata to Watashi ni Dekiru Koto: Japanese Title: あなたと私にできる事; Released: 27 April 2005	103	Merry Andrew
2005	Lost Child: Released: 27 July 2005	109	Merry Andrew
2005	Samishigariya no Kotobatachi: Japanese Title: さみしがり屋の言葉達; Released: 5 October 2005	35	Merry Andrew
2006	TEXAS: Released: 26 July 2006	45	shabon songs
2006	The Still Steel Down: Released: 25 October 2006	43	shabon songs
2007	Unabara no Tsuki: Japanese Title: 海原の月; Released: 17 October 2007	12	chronicle.
2008	Parallel: Japanese Title: パラレル; Released: 19 March 2008	20	chronicle.
2009	Paxmaveiti ラフマベティ -君が僕にくれたもの-: Released: 25 November 2009	26	Japanese Pop
2011	Kagayakashiki Hibi: Released: 30 November 2020; Japanese Title: 輝かしき日々	53	Kanchigai
2015	360 ° Surround: Released: 29 July 2015; Japanese Title: 360°サラウンド	59	Itadaki Mono
2017	Ame to Pantsu: Released: 3 June 2017; Japanese Title: 雨とぱんつ	—N/a	Italan
2018	Tantei Monogatari: Released: 8 April 2018; Japanese Title: 探偵物語	—N/a	Italan
2018	Kore de ī nda yo: Released: 8 August 2018; Japanese Title: これでいいんだよ	—N/a	Italan
2019	Koishī: Released: 12 June 2019; Japanese Title: 恋しい	—N/a	Barometz
2019	Kan: Released: 27 July 2019; Japanese Title: 鑑	—N/a	Barometz
2021	Shōgeki: Released: 3 February 2021; Japanese Title: 衝撃	49	Kongtong Recordings
2021	ReadyReady: Released: 10 August 2021; Japanese Title: ReadyReady	—N/a	Kongtong Recordings

=== DVDs ===
1. The Moon and the Sun. (19 April 2006)
2. Tour 2008 "Encyclopedia." Final (7 January 2009)

=== Piano score ===
1. Yuko Ando Selection for Piano (22 July 2006)

== Filmography ==
=== Acting ===
==== Movies ====
- Mamotte Agetai! (1999)
- Saimin (1999)
- A Drop of the Grapevine (2014)
- And So the Baton Is Passed (2021)
- Kyrie (2023)
- Meets the World (2025)
- The Imaginary Dog and the Lying Cat (2026)
- All Greens (2026)

==== Television ====
- Ikebukuro West Gate Park (2000)

==== Commercial ====
- Hitachi au W32H
- Sapporo Beverage Co., Ltd. Gerolsteiner

=== Theme songs ===
- Film "2LDK" (2003) - End theme song "Rinjin ni hikari ga sasu toki"
- TV series "Meteor Garden" (2001) - End theme song for BS TV "Sally"
- TV series "Gilgamesh" (2003) - End theme song "Wasuremono no Mori"
- Film "Jigyaku no Uta" (2007) - Title song "Unabara no Tsuki"
- Video game "Professor Layton and the Last Specter" - Title song "Paxmaveiti"
- TV series "Attack on Titan: The Final Season" (2020) - End theme song "Shōgeki"

== Radio ==
- Splash Dream (Date FM, February 2004)
- Middle Tempo Magic (North Wave, July–December 2004)
- Oh! My Radio (J-Wave, October 2006 – March 2007)

== See also ==
- List of J-pop artists
