= 009-1 =

Japanese manga series by Shotaro Ishinomori

- Promotional poster from the 009-1 anime

ゼロゼロナイン・ワン (Zero Zero Nain Wan)
- Genre: Girls with guns; Science fiction; Spy
- Manga

009–1
- Written by: Shotaro Ishinomori
- Published by: Futabasha
- Magazine: Weekly Manga Action
- Original run: August 10, 1967 – November 14, 1974
- Volumes: 6
- Television drama

Flower Action 009–1
- Studio: Toei Company
- Original network: Fuji TV
- Original run: October 7, 1969 – December 30, 1969
- Episodes: 13
- Anime television series
- Directed by: Naoyuki Konno
- Produced by: Atsuhiro Iwakami; Hitoshi Miyata; Takashi Takano; Masayu Takigawa; Masahiro Yoshida
- Written by: Shinsuke Ōnishi
- Music by: Taku Iwasaki
- Studio: Ishimori Pro Izumu Studio; Studio Pastoral (Note: While actual animation production (アニメーション制作) is credited to the primary Ishimori Entertainment company, the Ishimori Izumu studio is credited with animation production assistance (アニメーション制作協力) as the primary company was not animation-capable. Alongside the Izumu studio, Studio Pastoral did uncredited production assistance as evidenced by studio CEO Yuuji Kanno's line producer credit, and the studio's website.)
- Licensed by: NA: Crunchyroll
- Original network: TBS, Animax
- English network: NA: Anime Network
- Original run: October 5, 2006 – December 21, 2006
- Episodes: 12
- Live-action film

009-1: The End of the Beginning
- Directed by: Koichi Sakamoto
- Produced by: Kazuo Kato
- Written by: Keiichi Hasegawa
- Music by: Yasuhiro Misawa
- Studio: Toei Company; Ishimori Productions
- Released: September 7, 2013
- Runtime: 84 minutes

009-1 (Note: Japanese: ゼロゼロナイン・ワン, Hepburn: Zero Zero Nain Wan; pronounced "Zero Zero Nine-One") is a Japanese manga series written and illustrated by Shotaro Ishinomori. The manga was serialized in the Futabasha publication Weekly Manga Action from 1967 to 1970, then returned briefly in 1974. The story concerns Miléne Hoffman ("Mylene" in the English translation), a female cyborg who works as a secret agent. The Japanese title of the manga was 009ノ1, or "Zero Zero Ku-no-ichi", a pun on kunoichi (female ninja) and a reference to the main character's espionage occupation.

The original manga was adapted into a live-action drama for Fuji Television in 1969 entitled Flower Action 009ノ1. The manga was also adapted into a 12-episode anime series by Ishimori Entertainment and first broadcast on TBS TV in Japan in late 2006. In June 2013, it was announced the manga would be adapted into a live-action film entitled 009-1: The End of the Beginning to be directed by Koichi Sakamoto, and starring Mayuko Iwasa. Minehiro Kinomoto, Nao Nagasawa, Mao Ichimichi, Shizuka Midorikawa, Naoto Takenaka, and Aya Sugimoto. It premiered on September 7, 2013.

Although it was also created by Ishinomori, and features similar themes, this seinen manga, despite the "00" name and the cybernetized protagonists, has no relation to his previous work Cyborg 009, a shōnen manga (although in the original manga, the cyborgs from Cyborg 009 actually make appearances in some chapters). In the final episode, there are two homages to Gerry Anderson television shows involving the Moon, an Eagle Transport from Space: 1999 and SHADO Mobiles from UFO. In the episode "Reverse-Explosion" a spaceship is destroyed by impacting the Moon. This is Thunderbird 5 from Thunderbirds.

== Premise ==
The story is set in an alternate reality where the West and the East blocs have been involved in a cold war for 140 years. Mylene Hoffman is a cyborg spy in the all-female "Nine Number Group", one of the ten groups in the Western Bloc "Zero Zero" intelligence organization. Her codename is "009-1" and she carries out missions assigned by her superiors. Almost her entire body has been cybernetized, and various parts of her body are equipped with special functions.

== Characters ==
=== Main ===
Mylene Hoffman (Note: ミレーヌ・ホフマン, Mirēnu Hofuman) (009–1)
Voiced by: Yumiko Shaku (Japanese); Alice Fulks (English)
She is a 009 agent of the all-female "Nine Number Group", one of the ten groups in the "Zero Zero Organization". She is designated as 009-1, but often referred to as "9-1". Almost her entire body has been cybernetized, and various parts of her body are equipped with special functions which are necessary for spy activity. Besides her standard weapon of a ray gun, the WA-P009 (commonly called a plasma gun), she also wears earring communicators, boots with a hidden needle gun, and has 9mm machine guns integrated into her breasts which fire bio-bullets. Her original physical abilities and clear mind makes her the single most outstanding agent in the Zero Zero Organization. She uses a number of aliases such as "Muse", "Miss Nine", "Cool Liz", "Lily Lam", "Mylene Duke", and "Melinda Pierce".
Number Zero (Note: ナンバーゼロ, Nanbāzero)
Voiced by: Houchu Ohtsuka (Japanese); Grant James (English)
Number Zero is the commander of the "Zero Zero Organization" of the Western Bloc. No one knows his true identity. He can be seen as father figure to Mylene, but during missions, their exchanges are always businesslike. He is essentially calm, cool, and collected, although on occasion, he has shown emotion when speaking with his subordinates.
Loki (Note: ロキ, Roki)
Voiced by: Toshiyuki Morikawa (Japanese); Gray Haddock (English)
He is an agent from the Eastern Bloc He is calm, cool, and collected, with a sharp mind and uncommonly-good physical abilities, like "the 009-1 of the Eastern Bloc". He was invited to the haunted castle along with Odin and Freya where he first met Mylene. Later, it is revealed that he is 009-1's younger brother, Paul.

=== Recurring ===
Vanessa Ibert (009–3)
Voiced by: Satsuki Yukino (Japanese); Celeste Roberts (English)
She is a 009 Number agent who has been specially modified with a focus on electronic-analysis equipment. Just by "looking" at the target, the camera built into her eye can store the target's data in her brain's memory. She is also capable of downloading the information she has gained into a compact device through the connector on the back of her neck.
Berta Kastner (009–4)
Voiced by: Akeno Watanabe (Japanese); Serena Varghese (English)
She is a 009 Number agent who has the most points of cybernetic modification. Her four limbs have been modified, and both elbows and both knees can be equipped with tactical units suited for the particular mission. Her motif is that of Albert Heinrich (004) from Cyborg 009, who was equipped with weapons all over his body.
Mia Connery (009–7)
Voiced by: Marina Inoue (Japanese); Rebekah Dahl (English)
She is a 009 Number agent whose entire skeletal structure, as well as all of her muscles and skin, are composed of a special biological tissue, making it possible for her to make a complete transformation into any person, far beyond a simple disguise. She has a cute baby-face, but she is a cool agent who does not show sentiment or emotion during a mission.
Ludmilla Schindler
Voiced by: Tomoko Miyadera (Japanese); Vicki Barosh (English)
Schindler is the Director of Intelligence of Eastern Bloc's S Area, somewhere in Eastern Europe.
Ivan Gudonov
Voiced by: Jin Yamanoi (Japanese); John Gremillion (English)
Gudonov is the Deputy Intelligence Director of Eastern Bloc's S Area. He is a ruthless man who would rather be at war than negotiate for peace.

== Media ==
=== Anime ===
A 12-episode anime series was produced by Ishimori Entertainment and XeNN Studios in partnership with Aniplex and first broadcast on TBS in Japan in late 2006. The anime was licensed for a North American release by A.D. Vision for $325,000. The first volume was released on June 19, 2007, although it was originally scheduled for release in March 2007. In 2008, the show, along with 30 other ADV titles were relicensed to Funimation. Most episodes are self-contained stories except for episodes 10–12 which combine to tell one story.

Episode 13 is an extra episode that was never aired on television and chronologically takes place between episodes 4 and 5. It was included with volume 5 of the Japanese DVD boxed set release.

==== Episode list ====
No.	Title	Original release date
1	"Infiltrators"; Transliteration: "Senyūsha-tachi" (Japanese: 潜入者たち)	October 5, 2006
Mylene spends the night with a man who is an Eastern bloc spy, but when he tries to assassinate her she kills him instead. Meanwhile, in the Eastern Bloc, Dr. Soyuz is concerned that his new energy source will be used for war. On the eve of the signing of a nuclear disarmament treaty between the Western and the Eastern blocs, Zero Zero is tasked with assisting Dr. Soyuz to defect to the West. After negotiating as series of false leads and traps, Mylene and Zero Zero retrieve the data and foil plans to sabotage the treaty by Ludmilla Schindler and Ivan Gudonov of the Eastern bloc military.
2	"Holy Night"; Transliteration: "Seiya" (Japanese: 聖夜)	October 12, 2006
In the Eastern Bloc, captured mutants are brought to Dr. Green for research purposes. On Christmas Eve, Mylene is called in to accompany the Western Bloc's Genetic Mutation Disposal Squad, as they try to exterminate the mutant child which has already caused the death of one agent. The squad led by Double Gomez storm the family's isolated house but only succeed in killing the child's unarmed parents. After a chase through the snow, they catch her, but the squad proceeds to fight among themselves and Gomez kills himself. Mylene see the young girl and realizes that she is not malicious, but only reflects people's emotions and intentions back on themselves and so she decides to let the child escape.
3	"Hard Boiled"; Transliteration: "Hādo Boirudo" (Japanese: ハードボイルド)	October 19, 2006
An elite Eastern Bloc "hard-boiled" (Note: tough; unsentimental) sniper called Egg is killing agents of Zero Zero intelligence organization. Mylene is given the task of stopping him, but she is also on his target list. He follows her to a remote island and he misses his first shot for the first time. He calls himself a professional, but is fixated on his own methodology and unwilling to change. After Mylene and Egg dine together, they commence a game of cat and mouse, each trying to outwit the other and learn their secrets. However, days later neither succeeds and they spend the night together. As the deadline to kill Mylene approaches, they agree on a final duel and Mylene wins by exploiting his fixations.
4	"Invitation from an Old Castle"; Transliteration: "Kojō Yori no Shōtaijō" (Japanese: 古城よりの招待状)	October 26, 2006
A mysterious figure known only as Phantom, claiming to be an agent of the group Golden Bat, kidnaps the Western Bloc scientist Dr. Satonaka. He invites three agents from the West, Mylene, Mars and Opollo, and three from the East, Loki, Freya, and Odin to his haunted castle for a treasure hunt, with Dr. Satonaka's research AI data as the prize. Freya starts searching before the arranged start time and winds up dead as does Opollo. Meanwhile, the Phantom captures Odin and Mars and prepares to guillotine them and reveals that he is Satonaka himself, He is seeking revenge for a failed kidnap event three years earlier in which his research staff and wife Maria were needlessly killed in the crossfire between the West and East forces. He executes the two agents and then causes an explosion, destroying the castle. In the aftermath, the surviving agents introduce themselves as "Muse" and "Loki", neither of which are their real names.
5	"Woman of Gold"; Transliteration: "Ōgon no Onna" (Japanese: 黄金の女)	November 2, 2006
Mylene is on a vacation in Italy and meets a mysterious woman on the road who is being chased by Golden Bat agents. She helps the seemingly helpless woman escape them and takes her to destination of the Trevi Fountain in Rome. Meanwhile, 009-4 and 009-7 follow an Eastern Bloc courier named Borzov to the same destination. On a tip-off, Mylene goes to the Colosseum where she finds 009-4 wounded and realizes the woman is involved. The woman attacks Mylene who realizes that the woman is almost invulnerable. After Mylene fires a napalm bomb, the woman is unaffected and is revealed to be a golden cyborg. They continue the battle, and Mylene finally manages to destroy her with a massive charge of electricity.
6	"POP"; Transliteration: "Poppu" (Japanese: ポップ)	November 9, 2006
Mylene visits her old mentor Mr. Ironheart who has gone AWOL. He infiltrated Dr. Green's Eastern bloc Supernatural Power Research Facility three months earlier, but failed to return with the data. When she finds him they reminisce about their old missions together when she was still a rookie spy and he used "pop" as his keyword to trigger his explosives. He explains that when he infiltrated the facility, he found that Dr. Etcetera had died while investigating a drug for use on mutant children to accelerate their mental abilities, but which resulted in their deaths. Ironheart was overcome by the naive creativity of the children, and Etcetera's assistant gave him the only drug samples. However, Ironheart considers that he failed his mission because he became emotionally involved. Suddenly, they are surrounded by East bloc soldiers so Ironheart acts as a decoy to enable Mylene to escape. She then explodes a bomb to destroy both him and the soldiers, using his old keyword, "pop".
7	"Port"; Transliteration: "Minato" (Japanese: 港)	November 16, 2006
Thomas Gustav, a genius chess player from country S defected to the West with his wife Ingrid some years ago, but he is now suspected of being a spy. Mylene is sent to investigate and pretends to be a runaway girl named Eileen. She befriends a young boy called Billy, who lives in a military port town with his drunkard grandfather Bart. She learns that Billy's adopted mother regularly visits with presents of boats which Billy sets off from the harbour. Mylene discovers that the boats contain tracking transmitters. The woman is in fact Ingrid, and she has been using the toy boats to send messages to the Eastern Bloc.
8	"Calendar of the Past"; Transliteration: "Kinō no Koyomi" (Japanese: 昨日の暦)	November 23, 2006
Mylene is ordered to eliminate a double agent selling information to the Eastern Bloc at Sneg Pass. Meanwhile, the Zero Zero Organization Committee question her loyalty. Number Zero explains to the worried Committee members how Mylene's family defected to the Western Bloc looking for freedom, but her parents were killed near the border and she was separated from her brother Paul. She was rescued by a Western bloc spy called Nelson, and after growing up in an orphanage, she volunteered to join the Zero Zero Organization and underwent her training and the cybernetization process. Back at Sneg Pass, Mylene discovers that the double agent is Nelson. They both realize that she must kill him, and she does, but later she wonders if she has actually found the freedom in the West that her family wanted.
9	"Revenge"; Transliteration: "Fukushū" (Japanese: 復讐)	November 30, 2006
Mylene kills a cyborg enemy agent who says goodbye to "Billy" as he dies. She takes a month to recover from her injuries and on her way back to headquarters, the tyres on her 1950s Chevrolet Corvette convertible are deliberately punctured. She accepts a lift from a kind family of three in their 1950s BMW Isetta 600 Four-Seater. The father, Norman, reminisces of his childhood with his twin brother Dexter who was a pilot and they take a side trip to his old college and other places. At the house where he grew up, Norman reveals that his real name is Billy and he accuses Mylene of killing his brother Dexter. However, Mylene escaped her bonds and kills him in self defense, then kills his "handler". She leaves, angry at the Eastern Bloc for using an amateur to assassinate her, causing a family to be left without a father.
10	"Reverse-explosion"; Transliteration: "Gyaku-bakuhatsu" (Japanese: 逆爆発)	December 7, 2006
Mylene is assigned to replace Ironheart and investigate an Eastern bloc research facility run by Dr. Green which is experimenting on mutant children and goes undercover as a nurse. The Western Bloc suspect that The Eastern Bloc are using mutants for military purposes, and there may be a review of the Extermination Law which will sanction their use. Dr. Green causes a space station crash into the moon causing a nuclear explosion and appears to have his own agenda, supported by a man called Nelkovski. Meanwhile, the Western bloc receives an apparently childish letter threatening to explode nuclear weapons secretly stored by the two blocs in defiance of their nuclear disarmament treaty using a "Reverse Explosion" system unless they release all those being persecuted. Agent 009-3 flies in to an isolated facility in the Amazon which appears to be the source of the letter, but finds no evidence although she does see an Eastern bloc spy. Meanwhile, Eastern bloc troops surround Dr. Green's research facility. They order the staff to leave, but the mutant children to stay inside.
11	"Exodus"; Transliteration: "Dasshutsu" (Japanese: 脱出)	December 14, 2006
As Eastern bloc troops enter the research facility, Mylene disguised as a nurse, stays to protect the children, however, led by the young boy Victor, they try to escape. The encounter Dr. Green who leads them out via tunnels, explaining that he has a guilty conscience for the cruel experiments he carried out. When they are seen by troops, Mylene attacks them and is assisted by Nelkovski who reveals himself to be Loki. She creates a diversion allowing Loki, Dr. Green and the children to escape. However, she is completely outnumbered and surrenders. She is then tortured for information about the "Reverse Explosion" system. Meanwhile, in the Amazon, 009-3 has dreamed of natives being murdered by white soldiers and finds that everyone there regularly has the same dream. At Zero Zero headquarters, they receive news that stored nuclear weapons in remote locations have been exploded by the "Reverse Explosion" system at the appointed deadline.
12	"Daybreak"; Transliteration: "Yoake" (Japanese: 夜明け)	December 21, 2006
Agents 009-3, 009-4 and 009-7 report that they cannot find evidence of the "Reverse Explosion" system; however some Eastern bloc spies have taken shuttles to the moon. Mylene also travels to the moon where she finds Loki. He explains that the "Reverse Explosion" is the product of a psychic network; combining those with psychic powers in the East, those who escaped the Genetic Mutation Extermination Law in the West and the psychic children in the Amazon. The visit Dr. Green, but Eastern bloc agents have already arrived and Dr. Green is fatally shot in the ensuing struggle. Dr. Green wants the children freed, but Loki intends to send nuclear missiles towards Earth to cause the destruction of both the East and the West. Mylene disagrees with his plan and as they fight, they realize that they are both cyborgs, and he is her brother Paul. However, Eastern bloc troops break into the facility and shoot him. In the aftermath, the disarmament treaty is in tatters and Paul's body is not found. Although Mylene disobeyed orders, she is not reprimanded because she still useful and is then assigned her next mission. She must Track down an Eastern bloc spy who has infiltrated the Barrymore company which is developing cyborg weapons.
13	"R&B"; Transliteration: "R&B" (Japanese: R&B)	TBA
Mylene is assigned to track an Eastern bloc cyborg called Sam. Mylene encounters him as if by accident, and he takes her in, but he appears to have little interest in her and is more interested in playing Jazz with his friends. Mylene and Sam gradually become close, spending a lot of time together while he plays his music. Suddenly, one night he says he planted a bomb in her body and explains that he knows all about her and her mission, and that the bomb will explode when the LP record he is playing ends. He reveals that he and his network of spies from the East and West have been exchanging secret information through their music for years because they deplore war and want to keep the balance of power equal. The music ends, but he explodes instead of Mylene, leaving her sad and tearful. Later, it is announced that there is a softening of relations between the East and West, and trade restrictions will be eased.

== Reception ==
Anime News Network's Theron Martin said the anime series "carries much of the style and flavor of Ishinomori's other iconic works like Kamen Rider and Kikaider" and noted "the series emphasizes Mylene's sex appeal by offering healthy and regular doses of fan service, although it leaves the most graphic parts to the imagination." He commented the character designs have "the same angular, caricatured look that all anime series based on Ishinomori's works have, with younger female "good guy" agents invariably being gorgeous sexpots and the bad guys (whether male or female) usually looking quite ugly." Martin also praised the musical score, saying it's "the other star of the series", aside from Mylene. Writing for Mania Entertainment, Chris Beveridge said 009-1 has "a good sense of pacing and style to it, going over the top in some ways but also keeping itself rather grounded in others. This is a world that I would love to see revisited on a more regular basis and lament that we're already more than halfway past it with this release."

Bryan Morton from Mania Entertainment described it as "James Bond with women, Najica with no panties (no not in that sense), a cold-war Ghost in the Shell - sort of." Morton said "the stories themselves are fairly typical secret-agents tales - recover the scientist, prevent killings and so on - just with a slightly futuristic feel to them", but noted "all the stories hold together well and make sense". As the original manga is "so old", for him "it's amazing that the show still feels contemporary." The kind-heart from the protagonist that is far more you would expect from a spy, "makes it different enough from other secret agent stories to really grab the attention, while the individual stories are a good combination of action and emotion that keep you entertained" in Morton's opinion.

Derek Elley of Film Business Asia gave the film a 6 out of 10.
