= Alice Fulks =

American actress

- Born: Alice Claire Fulks; January 16, 1982 (age 44); Houston, Texas
- Occupations: Voice actress, stage actress
- Notable credit(s): 009-1 as Mylene Hoffman; Gilgamesh as The Countess of Werdenberg

Alice Claire Fulks (born January 16, 1982) is a voice and stage actress who got her start in voiceover work after she was introduced to ADV Films' ADR director Steven Foster, who cast her as the Countess of Werdenberg in the 2003 anime series Gilgamesh. Following her spectacular performance as the Countess, Alice was later on cast as the lead role of Mylene Hoffman in 009-1, which was praised by ANN reviewer Theron Martin. In 2007, she was one of the hosts of the American Anime Awards presentation ceremony in New York Comic Con.

Currently, Alice resides in Los Angeles, California, where she is the founder and creative director for video production company A*Light Picture.

== Credits ==
- 009-1 - Mylene Hoffman (009-1)
- Air Gear - Natsumi Iriya
- Appleseed Ex Machina - Dr. Elizabeth Xander
- Best Student Council - Mayumi Minegishi
- Ghost Stories - Akane of the Broadcast Room
- Ghost Train - Kumi
- Gilgamesh - Countess Werdenberg
- Innocent Venus - Hijin
- Le Chevalier D'Eon - Empress Elizaveta of Russia
- Pumpkin Scissors - Hannah
- Red Garden - Isabelle Girardot
- Samurai Gun - Lady of the Evening, Running Prostitute
