= Das Beste =

Das Beste, German for "The Best", may refer to:

- Das Beste, an album by Adoro, 2013
- Das Beste, an album by Culcha Candela, 2010
- Das Beste, an album by Daniela Alfinito, 2016
- Das Beste, an album by Seer, 2002
- "Das Beste", a song by Duett, competing to represent Germany in the Eurovision Song Contest 1988 and Austria in the Eurovision Song Contest 1990

== See also ==
- Best (disambiguation), including uses of The Best
