= Best II =

Best II or Best 2 or variation, may refer to:

- ...Best II, 1992 compilation album by The Smiths
- Best II (Akina Nakamori album), 1988 compilation album by Akina Nakamori
- Best II, an album by BoA comprising songs released on Best & USA
- Best II ~Perfect Love~, 2008 compilation album by Toshi
- Best II 1981–1992, 1992 compilation album by Anthem
- The Best II, 1994 compilation album by Willie Colón
- Best 2, or A Best 2, 2007 compilation albums by Ayumi Hamasaki

== See also ==
- List of greatest hits albums
- Best (disambiguation)
