= Leaders of the Free World (song) =

Single by Elbow

from the album Leaders of the Free World
- B-side: "The Long War Shuffle"; "Mexican Standoff" (Spanish Version); "The Drunken Engineer"; "Gentle As"
- Released: 7 November 2005
- Recorded: 2005
- Genre: Alternative rock
- Length: 3:49
- Label: V2
- Songwriter(s): Guy Garvey, Elbow
- Producer(s): Elbow

Elbow singles chronology
"Forget Myself" (2005)	"Leaders of the Free World" (2005)	"Grounds for Divorce" (2008)

"Leaders of the Free World" is Elbow's second and last single from the album Leaders of the Free World. It is also Elbow's last single released through V2 Records.

== Track listing ==
CD1:

1. "Leaders of the Free World"
2. "The Long War Shuffle"

CD2 (Maxi-CD single):

1. "Leaders of the Free World" – 6:11
2. "Mexican Standoff" (Spanish Version) – 3:53
3. "The Drunken Engineer" – 2:12
4. "Leaders of the Free World" (Video) – 4:13

7" vinyl:

1. "Leaders of the Free World"
2. "Gentle As"

== Charts ==
Year (2005)	Peak position
UK Singles (OCC)	53
