= Best (footballer) =

Portuguese footballer

Personal information
- Full name: Artur Paulo Oliveira da Silva
- Date of birth: 24 December 1968 (age 57)
- Place of birth: Guimarães, Portugal
- Height: 1.77 m (5 ft 10 in)
- Position: Goalkeeper

Youth career
- 1980–1985: Vitória Guimarães
- 1985–1988: Porto

Senior career*
Years	Team	Apps	(Gls)
1988–1995	Salgueiros	50	(0)
1995–1996	Leça	4	(0)
1996–2001	Tirsense		
2001–2002	Terras de Bouro		
2002–2003	Quarteirense		

International career
1984	Portugal U16	2	(0)
1986	Portugal U18	2	(0)
- * Club domestic league appearances and goals

Artur Paulo Oliveira da Silva (born 24 December 1968), known as Best, is a Portuguese retired footballer who played as a goalkeeper.

== Club career ==
After unsuccessfully graduating at FC Porto's youth system, Best joined neighbouring S.C. Salgueiros in 1988 at nearly 20, going on to spend the following seven seasons with the Paranhos side, five of those in the Primeira Liga. His best output in the competition consisted of 12 games, in 1990–91 (eight goals conceded).

In the summer of 1996, after one unassuming top division campaign with Leça FC, Best signed for F.C. Tirsense in the second level, going on to experience three consecutive relegations with the same team. He retired from football in 2003 at the age of 34, after one-year spells with two amateur clubs.
