= Forget Myself =

2005 single by Elbow

Single by Elbow

from the album Leaders of the Free World
- B-side: "The Good Day", "Strangeways to Holcombe Hill in 4.20", "My Finger", "McGreggor"
- Released: 29 August 2005
- Length: 5:22
- Label: V2
- Songwriter(s): Guy Garvey, Elbow
- Producer(s): Elbow

Elbow singles chronology
"Grace Under Pressure/Switching Off" (2004)	"Forget Myself" (2005)	"Leaders of the Free World" (2005)

"Forget Myself" is English rock band Elbow's first single from their third studio album, Leaders of the Free World (2005), released in three formats: two CD singles and one 7-inch vinyl. One of the CDs was a maxi-CD single released on an enhanced CD. The song itself has a technical-like sound as well as usage of doubletracking in the vocals. The song entered the UK Singles Chart at number 22

"Strangeways to Holcombe Hill in 4.20" is an instrumental, reminiscent of several James Bond theme songs. "My Finger" is an Indigo Jones cover, a fellow-Manchester band. "The Good Day" is an atypically glam rock-style track, as well as "McGreggor" were added to the Japanese version of Leaders of the Free World as bonus tracks.

The song was debuted live, originally entitled "Buddha With Mace", at Blueprint Studios in Salford in May 2005, at a one-off gig as part of the Carling 24 Festival.

The song appeared in the 2006 film Southland Tales.

== Track listings ==
CD1

1. "Forget Myself" – 5:22
2. "The Good Day" – 3:44

CD2 (Maxi-CD single)

1. "Forget Myself" – 5:23
2. "Strangeways to Holcombe Hill in 4.20" – 4:22
3. "My Finger" – 2:41
4. "Forget Myself" (Video) – 3:48

7-inch vinyl

1. "Forget Myself" – 5:22
2. "McGreggor" – 2:33
