= BEST (tokamak) =

Burning plasma Experimental Superconducting Tokamak
- Device type: Tokamak
- Location: Hefei, China
- Affiliation: Hefei Institutes of Physical Science

Technical specifications
- Major radius: 3.6 m (12 ft)
- Minor radius: 1.1 m (3 ft 7 in)
- Plasma volume: 140 m^{3}
- Magnetic field: 5-6.15 T (61,500 G)
- Heating power: 50 MW
- Plasma current: 6-7 MA
- Plasma temperature: 5.7-7.4 keV
- Plasma density: 0.54-1.6×10^{20} m^{3}

History
- Year(s) of operation: 2027 (predicted)
- Preceded by: EAST

BEST, the Burning plasma Experimental Superconducting Tokamak, is a Chinese fusion experiment in Hefei. It aims to use superconductors to achieve moderately high magnetic fields in steady state. The goal is to achieve a net fusion power gain of five in pulsed operation, as well as breakeven in steady state. It builds on China's previous superconducting tokamak EAST, both using conventional low temperature superconductors. It has been compared to the SPARC tokamak being built by Commonwealth Fusion Systems in the USA, although SPARC is based on newer, higher field high temperature superconductor technology.

BEST will test tritium breeding blanket modules, but not attempt tritium self-sustainment initially. Its 1st Research Plan was drafted alongside researchers from EUROfusion and UKAEA, although they are not co-owners of the project. The high temperature superconducting magnetic coils were demonstrated under a related project called CRAFT (Comprehensive Research Accompanying Facility for Fusion Technology). BEST is intended as an intermediate stage between EAST and a Chinese Fusion Engineering Demo Reactor.
