= Newborn (surname) =

Newborn is a surname. Notable people with the surname include:

- Abe Newborn (c. 1920–1997), American talent agency and theatre producer
- Ira Newborn (born 1949), American composer
- Jud Newborn (born 1952), American author
- Lin Newborn (1974–1998), murder victim
- Phineas Newborn, Sr., jazz big band leader in Memphis. His sons:
  - Phineas Newborn, Jr. (1931–1989), jazz pianist
  - Calvin Newborn (1933–2018), American jazz guitarist
