= The Any Day Now EP =

EP by Elbow
- Released: 23 January 2001
- Recorded: 2000
- Genre: Alternative rock
- Length: Ugly Man Records: 21:39; V2: 15:05
- Labels: Ugly Man, V2
- Producer: Elbow

Elbow chronology
The Newborn EP (2000)	The Any Day Now EP (2001)	Asleep in the Back (2001)

The Any Day Now EP is Elbow's third release. This EP was released through Elbow's first record label Ugly Man Records, as well as their second record label V2 Records. Both EPs have different track listings.

The song "George Lassoes the Moon" on the Ugly Man Records version of the EP differs from the version on The Noisebox EP. Not only is it a minute shorter, but it also is musically more produced than the rough first version. "Wurzel" is an instrumental song.

== Track listing ==
=== Ugly Man Records ===
1. "Any Day Now" – 5:56
2. "Wurzel" – 2:14
3. "George Lassoes the Moon" – 5:49
4. "Don't Mix Your Drinks" – 3:24
5. "Any Day Now" (Radio Edit) – 4:16

=== V2 Records ===
1. "Any Day Now" – 5:54
2. "Wurzel" – 2:12
3. "Don't Mix Your Drinks" – 3:14
4. "None One" – 3:45
