= Gilgamesh (manga) =

Japanese manga series

ギルガメッシュ (Girugamesshu)
- Genre: Action, drama, fantasy, science fiction, horror
- Manga
- Written by: Shotaro Ishinomori
- Published by: Shōnen Gahōsha
- Magazine: Shōnen King
- Original run: 1976 – 1978
- Volumes: 6
- Anime television series
- Directed by: Masahiko Murata
- Written by: Akio Satsukawa
- Music by: Kaoru Wada
- Studio: Vistec Entertainment; Group TAC
- Licensed by: NA: ADV Films (formerly) AEsir Holdings
- Original network: FNS (KTV, Fuji TV)
- English network: NA: Anime Network; UK: Rockworld TV
- Original run: October 2, 2003 – March 18, 2004
- Episodes: 26

Gilgamesh (ギルガメッシュ, Girugamesshu) is a Japanese manga series written and illustrated by Shotaro Ishinomori. It was serialized in the Shōnen Gahōsha magazine Weekly Shōnen King from 1976 to 1978. In 2003, an anime series based on the original story was produced by Ishimori Entertainment and animated by Group TAC and Japan Vistec. Gilgamesh is set in the near future and the plot revolves around characters who can be divided into four groups: The Countess and the Orga-Superior, the Mitleid Corporation, the siblings, and the Gilgamesh. With the development of the plot, the past and motives of the characters and their relationships with one another are exposed.

The 26-episode anime television series was the first directed by Masahiko Murata, with music by Kaoru Wada. It was created by Group TAC, and it aired on Kansai TV from October 2, 2003, to March 18, 2004. The series received generally positive reviews and was subsequently translated, released on DVD and aired in several other countries, including the United States.

Music, mystery, intrigues and darkness are central elements of Gilgamesh's plot. The series shows clear influences from the story known as the Epic of Gilgamesh, and from different scientific and archaeological influences as well.

== Anime ==
=== Background ===
The backdrop of Gilgamesh is the fight between two opposing forces. One, 'the Gilgamesh,' is led by Terumichi Madoka, who is also called Enkidu, and the other is the Countess of Werdenberg and the three Orga-Superior children who live with her. In appearance, the Orga-Superior are indistinguishable from humans, however they are able to use psychic energy and control objects using their minds, a power referred to as "Dynamis" (a variation of the Greek "Dunamus" meaning "strength" "power" especially "miraculous power"). The overarching theme of Gilgamesh is one of choosing sides.

=== Central ===
The tomb of Gilgamesh in Uruk from the story 'The Epic of Gilgamesh' is discovered by a young genius-scientist named Terumichi Madoka, who is drawn to the energy called Dynamis, a word meaning 'power', resonating from the site. He reports his findings, and all of the world's best scientists gather there. When an unknown life form called Tear materializes in Delphys (a pit that seems to have no dimensions and that surrounds the tomb of Gilgamesh) and begins to contaminate embryos that surround it, the scientists stop all of the experiments. Dr. Madoka goes down to Delphys, breaches all of the guards around it and comes into direct contact with Tear, causing an immense explosion that blocks out the sky with a mirror-like layer. This is considered an act of terrorism, as after the explosion, computers and wireless communications stop working, and the planet falls into war and famine. The human population is nearly wiped out. This occurs on October 10, so the incident is called "Twin X" (after the Roman numeral symbol for the number 10).

Of the people who worked at Heaven's Gate, which is left in ruins, only Dr. Madoka and a woman introduced as the Countess of Werdenberg survive. Dr. Madoka flees, taking with him ten test subjects contaminated by the life form Tear from the rubble of Heaven's Gate, who grow up to become the ten Gilgamesh. The Countess of Werdenberg leads a team of three children (the Orga-Superior) who can use the Dynamis to battle the Gilgamesh that work for Dr. Madoka. The present Dr. Madoka (who calls himself Enkidu and that the Gilgamesh refer to as the Professor) does not appear until the very last episode of the series. It is learned through the Gilgamesh that he wants to wipe out the human race in a 'Cleansing Flood' and give rise to a new, more powerful human race.

Later in the series, a company known as the Mitleid Corporation throw themselves into the fray. The charismatic son of the Mitleid Chairman, Hayato Kazmatsuri, is a hardline anti-Gilgamesh military contractor who has made it his goal to wipe out the Gilgamesh through whatever means possible. However, Kazmatsuri cannot stand The Countess of Werdenberg because she refuses to tell the Orga-Superior and the siblings the truth about Twin X and their father's connection to it. As well, the siblings want to know the truth about how they were born.

Enkidu needs his two children, Tatsuya and Kiyoko to help him achieve his goal, but they want nothing to do with their terrorist father. The story starts out with them on the run from the Yakuza, because of their dead mother's debt. The story follows the repeated clashing of the four groups as the siblings, who can be called the main characters, try to figure out whom to trust (the Gilgamesh who appear to want a better world, the Countess and the Orga-Superior, who are fighting the Gilgamesh and trying to prevent what they believe is the end of humanity, or the Mitleid Corporation who are the only ones trying to tell the children the truth).

In the end of the series, The Countess of Werdenberg finds out that her heart itself was Tear and that the embryos were contaminated because of her hatred and jealousy towards Terumichi's wife. In the ensuing battle practically everyone dies, including all the Gilgamesh, Tatsuya, Kiyoko, the Orga-Superior, Reiko, and even Kazmatsuri — the final death, after being shot twice by the Countess. After the battle, the Countess surrenders her one-woman war against the sheltering sky, allowing Tear to enter her body and bring the Cleansing Flood. The sky descends, and the human world comes to an end.

In the last scene, Tear's goal of creating a new world has been realised but the "new" human it has given birth to reacts violently to its presence, since it has taken on the form of the young Countess. Consequently, the first act committed by the new human race is murder, suggesting that even Tear's attempts to restructure human nature were doomed from the beginning. After the final credits show, a gloomy scene depicting blood around the new human's face accompanied with a gleeful smile is shown.

== Characters ==
=== Principal ===
- Tatsuya Madoka:
  Voiced by: Daisuke Namikawa (Japanese); Blake Shepard (English)

Tatsuya is a clone of Terumichi Madoka but was given birth to by his wife Azusa and is therefore considered a son of Terumichi and a sibling of Kiyoko. He is fifteen years old and can use the Dynamis. He is extremely attached to his sister, as she is the only family he really has, his mother having descended into madness or depression following Twin X. He trusts the Countess more than his sister does, and assimilates with the Orga very easily, but he sometimes has trouble following the Countess's orders.

- Kiyoko Madoka:
  Voiced by: Chie Nakamura (Japanese); Shelley Calene-Black (English)

Kiyoko is about seventeen and was born before the Twin X terrorist attack, so she doesn't have the ability to use the Dynamis. However, she plays a very important role in the series. She acts as a surrogate mother to Tatsuya and has a hard time accepting the Countess's help because she feels like the countess is trying to take her brother away from her. She tries to leave the Countess twice. The first time she is caught and punished by the Countess by being thrown into the Hotel's underground prison. The Countess lets her go after she leaves a second time, but she has to her work to pay her debt to the Countess. She ends up living in a dank apartment in the only urban area in the world, and works as a hostess at a gentlemen's club, since the music store she originally worked at closed down. However, she doesn't let Tatsuya know that since she doesn't want him to worry about her. She loves music and is extremely sensitive to sound. She can match any sound to its proper note, and was taught to play the piano by her father when she was very little. All she wants is a peaceful life with her brother, but her mother's debt and the conflict between the Gilgamesh and Orga keep haunting her, as well as the memory of what her father did, so she can never find any peace. She eventually falls in love with Novem, one of the Gilgamesh. Her love is reciprocated, and she carries his child which becomes the first of a short-lived new species.

- The Countess of Werdenberg:
  Voiced by: Mitsuki Saiga (Japanese); Alice Fulks (English)

The Countess's real name is Hiroko Kageyama, and she had been employed at Heaven's Gate, working closely with Madoka. She became the Countess after marrying a wealthy scientist and Count she worked with, because the man she loved, Terumichi Madoka, was already married and had a daughter. When the Count dies in Twin X, she inherits his immense fortune. She appears to be the only survivor of the attack and lies in a coma for a few years before deciding to find the children who can use the Dynamis. She searches for and finds three children rumored to have magical powers, pulls them from some pretty bad situations, and raises them as her own children. She teaches them to use their powers, the Dynamis, to fight the Gilgamesh, although they don't know her reasoning for asking them to do such. She despises Kiyoko, most likely for being the daughter of the man she loved, and is much warmer towards Tatsuya because he looks exactly like Terumichi. She has a mansion, but she lives in a huge, fancy hotel. She has a formal dinner with her makeshift family every night, and has the children driven everywhere in the hotel's car which eventually became hers. She can use Dynamis as well, because to save her, cloned pieces of her that had been contaminated by Tear were put in her body. However, she uses it extremely sparingly, or is perhaps unable to use it outside of dangerous situations. She rarely smiles, is always dressed formally, and never speaks of her past.

=== Gilgamesh ===
Gilgamesh are six men and four women, capable of using Dynamis, who work for the scientist/terrorist Enkidu. Often portrayed as the antagonists and enemies of Orga, they are the 10 test subjects that Enkidu fled Heaven's Gate with. Their goal is to serve Enkidu by destroying the tower created to restore the blue sky and later cleanse the world in order to perpetuate a new species of human. Gilgamesh are created as half human, half god and made of anti-matter. They are referred to as 'God Beasts', referring to their second, non human forms. Gilgamesh are named after the lot number they were in the tomb of Gilgamesh. The female members of Gilgamesh wear red and the male members wear black and their tattoos, each in different places on their bodies, signify different aspects of divinity. The Gilgamesh never reveal their names in the anime.

The men and women of Gilgamesh.

- Uno:
  Voiced by: Akiko Kimura (Japanese); Lesley Tesh (English)

The first female Gilgamesh member introduced in the series, Uno (One) can be recognized by her light blue eyes, long red hair and the plait wound around her head. She has high standards; coming across as harsh and criticising. She is the first female member to die and the fourth member overall, impaled mercilessly on the many spears of the Blattaria and glaring at their leader Kazamatsuri the whole time. While she is scathing and harsh speaking, she listens and follows Novem's orders. She also has a very low opinion of Orga, not even becoming concerned when she is outnumbered two to one by Orga.

- Duo:
  Voiced by: Kenji Nojima (Japanese); Jose Diaz (English)

The replacement for Octo, Duo (Two) acts as a contrast to Novem. Duo is the most physically strong of the Gilgamesh in both forms, which is reflected in the size and shape of his God Beast form. It is remarked that Duo is harsh, angry and cruel and when fighting the Blattaria, uses his strength more than his Dynamis. Duo is recognizable by his hazel, almost gold eyes and white hair which sticks up wildly. According to Novem, he is also poetic but that may have been sarcasm as Duo was talking harshly about the city. He is more than willing to follow Novem's orders. His tattoo covers his entire back.

- Tria:
  Voiced by: Junichi Suwabe (Japanese); Josh Wright (English)

Unlike other members of Gilgamesh, his Dynamis takes shape in the form of Lightning strikes as demonstrated in episode eighteen when Tria singlehandedly destroys an Army of Blattaria. Tria's personality comes off as very angry and snobbish. Tria can be recognized by his long blond hair. There is an underlying tension between Tria and Novem over who should lead Gilgamesh. Tria does not see the killing of humans as wrong but rather as a cleansing. His mark is found on his hand.

- Quattuor:
  Voiced by: Aoi Muratake (Japanese); Imani Harris (English)

The third member of the female Gilgamesh to be introduced, Quattuor is unlike the other female members of Gilgamesh. Firstly she can be recognized as the only Gilgamesh to have a visible tattoo on her body, as her eye is covered with one. She also has darker-colored skin from the rest of the Gilgamesh (possibly being African). As well, she can be recognized by her very short gray hair. Quattuor appears to have the power to control the weather. Quattuor is aware of the rivalry between Tria and Novem but doesn't care about it. She is satisfied as long as Enkidu's will is carried out.

- Cinque:
  Voiced by: Ema Kogure (Japanese); Melissa Davis (English)

The final member of Gilgamesh to be seen, she does not appear until episode twenty-four. There is little known about her, though she is easily recognizable with her short brown bobbed hair. She is known as "Quinque" in the Japanese version. Cinque acts as a messenger between Enkidu and the other members of Gilgamesh.

- Sex:
  Voiced by: Makoto Homura (Japanese); Kalob Martinez (English)

Sex has hazel eyes and short, light red hair that seems to stick out in every direction simultaneously. Sex is often the opponent of Fuko, and seems to be attracted to her, from their first clash trying to sway Tatsuya and Kiyoko to the time they fight in an alleyway. Sex gets Fuko at a disadvantage — using his body to restrain her he tells her: "The closer I get, the better you look", to which Fuko responds "Then you're too close" and kicks him away. Sex is one of the first three members of Gilgamesh seen, when he is introduced along with Novem and Octo to try to tempt Kiyoko and Tatsuya to Gilgamesh's side. The first Gilgamesh member to transform into his God Beast form and the second to fall, Sex (Six) gives his life in order to destroy the Tower, creating chaos and killing hundreds of people in the town. His tattoo is around his navel.

- Septem:
  Voiced by: Eri Oono (Japanese); Taylor Hannah (English)

The second female member to appear, she first appears in episode eighteen when she tries to take back Novem from Kiyoko Madoka, She appears to be the most vengeful and spiteful female member of the Gilgamesh. She can be recognized by her long brown hair and dark blue eyes. She is the physically strongest female member of the Gilgamesh. Septem is the strongest supporter of Novem in Gilgamesh and goes out of her way in battle to help Novem out. Septem is particularly attached to Novem. She heals the wounds Novem got while fighting the Blattaria by kissing him. It is no surprise that with her close (but rather one-sided) relationship to Novem, that Septem dislikes Kiyoko so much.

- Octo:
  Voiced by: Takahito Mito (Japanese); Adam Conlon (English)

The first Gilgamesh member to die, Octo (Eight) is dealt a fatal wound when Orga clashed with Gilgamesh after Gilgamesh kidnapped Kiyoko from the Hotel Providence. A building at the airport collapses on Octo, who struggles out from under the rubble, nearly completely unable to move. As the Countess coolly informs Isamu to retrieve the body for scientific study, Octo recognizes Novem, who inclines his head regretfully, and Octo reverses his anti-matter, causing a massive explosion that rocks the whole area. Octo has ice blue eyes and dark brown hair cut just above his chin, and bangs. He is one of the three first introduced and is the one to significantly make five cups of cocoa instead of three. Octo is the most gentle of the Gilgamesh with the possible exception of Novem, and likes animals, as illustrated when he is seen feeding the seagulls popcorn shortly before his death. His tattoo is on the back of his neck.

- Novem:
  Voiced by: Shigeru Shibuya (Japanese); Logan Keslar (English)

The most charismatic and prominent member of Gilgamesh, Novem (Nine) is the kind blond who eventually captures Kiyoko's heart. He has blue eyes and short hair with a fringe usually covering his right eye. He remains calm at all times, and generally takes a position equivalent to leader, giving the orders to his team members. Novem genuinely believes that Gilgamesh has a sacred purpose, regardless of the lives taken to get to that end. In the battle with Kazamatsuri's Blattaria where his teammates die, Novem is shot with a substance which converts anti-matter to matter, which grievously injures him. Falling unconscious, he is found by Kiyoko who tries to heal him. With Kiyoko as the mother, Novem is the father of a very short-lived new human race. He confesses to Tatsuya "Your sister.... I did love her" before his death. His tattoo is on his left shoulder.

- Decem:
  Voiced by: Hirofumi Nojima (Japanese); David Matranga (English)

The last male member of the Gilgamesh to be seen. Decem's Dynamis seems to be able to manifest itself in the power of Water; he is a strong Dynamis user, but there is little else known about him. He can be recognized by his ponytailed blue hair. Decem is more calm than Tria in meeting but seems to like Tria over Novem.

=== Mitleid ===
The Mitleid Corporation is a group of anti-Gilgamesh hardliners bent on destroying the Gilgamesh at any cost. The Corporation itself is led by its mysterious Chairman, Toranosuke Yuki.

- Toranosuke Yuki:
  Voiced by: Rokuro Naya (Japanese); Ernie Manouse (English)

Despite only appearing in one episode, Chairman Yuki is introduced into the story when the Countess receives a letter stating that the Chairman would be holding a living funeral as he was growing deathly ill and did not have much time left. It was later discovered that the Chairman present at the funeral was but a body double and the real Chairman was being hidden in another room in his estate, in case the Gilgamesh attacked. Toranosuke is killed (inadvertently) by Reiko while on his deathbed when she tries to revive him with an accidentally lethal dose of Dynamis. Among other oddities in his Estate, the Chairman keeps pomegranate trees and also has a pond filled with salamander-like hybrids. Chairman Yuki was responsible for a majority of the funding of Heaven's Gate.

- Reiko Yuki:
  Voiced by: Kae Araki (Japanese); Hilary Haag (English)

A quiet young girl who dresses in a very formal kimono dress and generally seems to have an aura of mystery around her. For some reason her hair always covers what some might believe to be her eyes — it is later found out that she underwent surgery to give her eyes to Chairman Yuki because he had gone blind and she felt sorry for him. However, it was discovered that she was a Dynamis user and thus did not need her eyes in order for her to see. Because she has lived such a long time without her eyesight, her Dynamis is much further advanced than anyone else's in the series, as she has the power to lift even the largest buildings. Later in the series she is in fact revealed to be Chairman Yuki's clone and therefore a boy. His death in the final battle is gruesome, as Tria's God Beast form tears him limb from limb.

- Hayato Kazmatsuri
  Voiced by: Keiji Fujiwara (Japanese); Paul Oddo (English)

The son of Chairman Yuki, he was born out of an affair with one of the Chairman's many mistresses. Kazmatsuri is depicted as a very angry and stubborn warmonger. He is the owner of his own weapons contracting company. His greatest creation however is his army of anti-Gilgamesh creatures, known as the Blattaria. Kazmatsuri is the one who told the Orga children about how they were born and how they came about.

- Professor Eriko Enuma
  Voiced by: Misa Watanabe (Japanese); Emily Carter-Essex (English)

An acquaintance of the Countess of Werdenberg, she works for the Mitleid corporation and tries to change the sky back to its original shape, which she succeeds in doing. Unfortunately, her plan backfires as the Gilgamesh work their way up the tower and Sex sacrifices himself to blow up the entire facility. Professor Enuma dies, after the tower collapses.

During the course of the series it is revealed that Professor Enuma was one of the Heaven's Gate scientists and the only one away from the building during XX. She was away while implanting herself with her own clone in order to have a child. However, that child is killed along with many others due to XX and Professor Enuma has a personal grudge against the sheltering sky that she blames for her child's death. Enuma was the one who first brought the countess to Heaven's Gate.

=== Orga ===
Orga is the name of the organization that includes the Countess's three adopted children: Isamu, Fuko and Tohru, whom she uses to fight Gilgamesh. Isamu, Fuko and Tohru (along with Tatsuya) are later revealed to be clones of original scientists at Heaven's Gate, contaminated in the Twin X explosion by Tear's light resulting in their ability to use Dynamis. It is also revealed that the embryos of their DNA were put into pigs, which means that their "birth mother" is technically a pig. However, later and to his relief, Tohru learns that he was indeed born from a human mother just like Tatsuya.

- Toru Tsukioka
  Voiced by: Kōki Miyata (Japanese); Quentin Haag (English)
- Isamu Fujisaki
  Voiced by: Kentarō Itō (Japanese); Andrew Love (English)
- Fuko Omuro
  Voiced by: Sanae Kobayashi (Japanese); Brittney Karbowski (English)

== DVD releases ==
| Title | Number | Release date |
|---|---|---|
| Gilgamesh Tablet 01: Orphans of the Apocalypse (Tatsuya Madoka) | 1 | June 21, 2005 |
1. Les Préludes; 2. Gräfin Werdenberg; 3. Children of a Lesser God; 4. Hotel Providence; 5. Dynamis
| Gilgamesh Tablet 02: Cage Without a Key (Kiyoko Madoka) | 2 | August 9, 2005 |
6. The Sheltering Sky; 7. Dissonance; 8. Adieu l'hiver 9. In the Core Settlement
| Gilgamesh Tablet 03: A Wake for the Undead (Novem) | 3 | October 18, 2005 |
10. Saint Terrorism; 11. Far from XX; 12. Die Lustige Witwe; 13. Pomegranate
| Gilgamesh Tablet 04: Under a Blood Red Sky (Uno) | 4 | December 27, 2005 |
14. October Project; 15. La Blattaria; 16. Nessun Dorma; 17. Hammerklavier
| Gilgamesh Tablet 05: As Truth Breaks Like Glass (Isamu Fujisaki) | 5 | February 28, 2006 |
18. Blue Zone; 19. Orga-Superior; 20. Tear
| Gilgamesh Tablet 06: In the Soul Eclipse (The Countess of Werdenberg) | 6 | April 25, 2006 |
21. Delphys; 22. Heaven's Gate; 23. Sacrifice
| Gilgamesh Tablet 07: All Fall Down (Terumichi Madoka) | 7 | June 13, 2006 |
24. Cleansing Flood; 25. Conversation Piece; 26. Gil Games Night
| Gilgamesh Thinpak Collection (Tatsuya Madoka and Kiyoko Madoka) | | May 22, 2007 |

== Music ==
Gilgamesh, like many other anime, features a sequence of classical music as a prominent theme throughout the series. In this case, the 'adagio' from Beethoven's Emperor Concerto is a recurring piece and "Love Unspoken" from Franz Lehár's "The Merry Widow". The Robert Lowry-composed hymn "Shall We Gather at the River?" also appears several times, either sung by one or more characters or played on the Hotel Providence's piano.

=== Opening theme ===
- Crazy 4 U by Koda Kumi

=== Ending Theme ===
- Wasuremono no Mori by Yuko Ando
