= Newborn (Elbow song) =

2001 song by Elbow

Single by Elbow

from the album Asleep in the Back
- B-side: "Lucky with Disease"; "One Thing That Was Bothering Me"; "None One"
- Released: 8 October 2001
- Recorded: 1998–2000
- Genre: Alternative rock; progressive rock
- Length: 7:33
- Label: V2
- Songwriter(s): Guy Garvey; Elbow
- Producer(s): Steve Osborne; Elbow

Elbow singles chronology
| "Powder Blue" (2001) | "Newborn" (2001) | "Asleep in the Back" / "Coming Second" (2002) |

"Newborn" is a single by English rock band Elbow and is the third single from their debut album, Asleep in the Back. There were four formats (all of which were released solely in the UK): one CD promo, one 12" vinyl remix promo, 2CD, and 12" vinyl. Several of the songs on the single had been previously on The Newborn EP.

The Genesis song "Entangled" was an influence on the musical arrangement of the song.

== Track listing ==
All releases were released in the UK

CD Promo

1. "Newborn" – 7:33

12" Vinyl Remix Promo

1. "Newborn" (Press Your Lips El Presidente mix) – 5:57
2. "Newborn" (Bitten by the Black Dog) – 4:39

CD1

1. "Newborn" (album version) – 7:39
2. "One Thing That Was Bothering Me" – 4:50
3. "None One" – 3:47

CD2

1. "Newborn" (album version) – 7:33
2. "Lucky with Disease" – 3:50
3. "Newborn" (Press Your Lips El Presidente mix) – 5:57

12" Vinyl

1. "Newborn" (Album Version) – 7:33
2. "Lucky with Disease" – 3:50
3. "Newborn" (Bitten by the Black Dog) – 4:39
