= Asleep in the Back =

2001 album by Elbow

Studio album by Elbow
- Released: 7 May 2001
- Recorded: 1997–2001
- Genre: Alternative rock; art rock; progressive rock; post-Britpop
- Length: 61:41
- Label: V2
- Producer: Steve Osborne, Ben Hillier, Danny Evans, Elbow

Elbow chronology
The Any Day Now EP (2001)	Asleep in the Back (2001)	Cast of Thousands (2003)

Singles from Asleep in the Back
- 1. "Red" Released: 23 April 2001; 2. "Powder Blue" Released: 9 July 2001; 3. "Newborn" Released: 8 October 2001; 4. "Asleep in the Back"/"Coming Second" Released: 4 February 2002

Asleep in the Back is the debut studio album by English rock band Elbow, first released in the United Kingdom on 7 May 2001, and in the United States on 22 January 2002. The title track, "Asleep in the Back", was only included as a bonus track on later editions of the album after it had been released as a single and became the band's first Top 20 hit. The album release came in four different versions: the 12-track version, two 11-track versions only featuring either "Asleep in the Back" (later editions) or "Can't Stop" (UK version) and a 10-track version including neither of them. The record was shortlisted for the Mercury Prize in 2001.

Though Asleep in the Back was the first Elbow album to be released, it was not the first to be recorded. An album's worth of recorded material had been scrapped by the band several years earlier after they were dropped by their first major label, Island Records.

A 2CD/1DVD deluxe edition of the album was released in the UK on 2 November 2009. The release included almost all tracks of the near impossible to find The Noisebox EP: a live version of "George Lassoes the Moon" was included instead of the studio version.

== Critical reception ==
Professional ratings
Aggregate scores
Source	Rating
Metacritic	82/100
Review scores
Source	Rating
AllMusic	3/5 stars
The Daily Telegraph	4/5 stars
Entertainment Weekly	B−
The Guardian	4/5 stars
Los Angeles Times	3.5/4 stars
NME	9/10
Pitchfork	7.4/10 (2002); 8.4/10 (2009) (Deluxe Edition)
Q	4/5 stars
Spin	6/10
Uncut	4/5 stars

According to the review aggregator Metacritic, Asleep in the Back received "universal acclaim" based on a weighted average score of 82 out of 100 from 19 critic scores.

Q listed Asleep in the Back as one of the best 50 albums of 2001.

== Track listing ==
All tracks are written by Elbow; all lyrics by Guy Garvey.

Asleep in the Back album
No.	Title	Length
1.	"Any Day Now"	6:17
2.	"Red"	5:11
3.	"Little Beast"	4:15
4.	"Powder Blue"	4:31
5.	"Bitten by the Tailfly"	6:16
6.	"Asleep in the Back" (not included on initial release)	3:47
7.	"Newborn"	7:36
8.	"Don't Mix Your Drinks"	3:16
9.	"Presuming Ed (Rest Easy)"	5:26
10.	"Coming Second"	4:56
11.	"Can't Stop" (all UK and most recent editions)	4:36
12.	"Scattered Black and Whites"	5:30

Japanese Bonus Track

No.	Title	Length
13.	"Vum Garda"	7:55

Double 12" vinyl album (Original Pressing)

No.	Title	Length
1.	"Any Day Now"	6:17
2.	"Red"	5:11
3.	"Little Beast"	4:15
4.	"Powder Blue"	4:31
5.	"Bitten by the Tailfly"	6:16
6.	"Vum Garda" (bonus track)	7:55
7.	"Newborn"	7:36
8.	"Don't Mix Your Drinks"	3:16
9.	"Presuming Ed (Rest Easy)"	5:26
10.	"Coming Second"	4:56
11.	"Can't Stop"	4:36
12.	"Scattered Black and Whites"	5:30

Note: later pressing include Asleep in the Back instead of Vum Garda

=== 2009 Deluxe Edition ===
Disc one
Same as 12-track version.

Disc two (bonus disc)

No.	Title	Length
1.	"Powder Blue" (The Noisebox EP Version)	4:37
2.	"Red" (The Noisebox EP Version)	3:31
3.	"Theme from Munroe Kelly" (The Noisebox EP Version)	5:47
4.	"Can't Stop" (The Noisebox EP Version)	4:21
5.	"Bitten by the Tailfly" (Live at the Astoria)	6:22
6.	"Coming Second" (Live at the Astoria)	5:10
7.	"Don't Mix Your Drinks" (Live at the Astoria)	3:46
8.	"Can't Stop" (Live at the Astoria)	5:19
9.	"Scattered Black and Whites" (Live at the Astoria)	6:27
10.	"George Lassoes the Moon" (Live at the Astoria)	3:27
11.	"Newborn" (Live Radio 1 Steve Lamacq Session)	2:59
12.	"Don't Mix Your Drinks" (Live Radio 1 Steve Lamacq Session)	2:13
13.	"Red" (Live Radio 1 Steve Lamacq Session)	4:57

Disc three (DVD)

No.	Title	Length
1.	"Asleep in the Back: The Movie" (directed by Soup Collective)

== Release history ==
Country	Date	Label	Format	Catalogue #
United Kingdom	7 May 2001	V2	CD (10 tracks)	VVR1015888
United Kingdom	7 May 2001	V2	CD (11 tracks)	VVR1015882
United Kingdom	7 May 2001	V2	Double 12" vinyl (one bonus track)	VVR1015881
United Kingdom	11 February 2002	V2	CD (12 tracks)	VVR1019012
United States	22 January 2002	V2	CD (12 tracks)	63881-27116-2
Japan	2 May 2001	V2 Japan	CD (one bonus track)	V2CI99
United Kingdom	2 November 2009	Polydor	2CD/1DVD Deluxe Edition	5321322

== Singles ==
In the UK, there were four singles released from the album:

- "Red" (23 April 2001)
- "Powder Blue" (9 July 2001)
- "Newborn" (8 October 2001)
- "Asleep in the Back"/"Coming Second" (4 February 2002)

Also, three EPs preceded the album's release, all of which included versions of songs that later appeared on Asleep in the Back:

- The Noisebox EP (1 January 1998)
- The Newborn EP (7 August 2000)
- The Any Day Now EP (Ugly Man release with 4 tracks) (23 January 2001)
  - V2 also released this EP with 5 tracks (26 February 2001)

== Personnel ==
Elbow

- Guy Garvey – Lead vocals, backing vocals, acoustic and electric guitars, percussion, analogue synth, wine glasses, harmonica, wybercron
- Mark Potter – Electric and acoustic guitars, backing vocals
- Craig Potter – Piano, organ, backing vocals, analogue synth, percussion, wine glasses, keyboards
- Pete Turner – Bass guitar, analogue synth, backing vocals, wine glasses
- Richard Jupp – Drums, percussion, backing vocals

Additional musicians

- The Elbow Choir – Vocals (9,10)
- Danny Evans – Percussion Loops (1)
- Ben Hillier – Percussion (2), Backing Vocals (10)
- Ian Burdge – Cello (2), Musical Director (6)
- Francoise Lemoignan – Saxophone (4)
- Bob Sastri – Brass (5), French Horn (6)
- Nick Coen – Brass (5)
- Martin Field – Bassoon (6)
- Stuart King – Clarinet (6), Bass Clarinet (6)
- Matthew Gunner – French Horn (6)
- Jonathan Snowden – Flute (6), Alto Flute (6)
- Dominic Kelly – Cor Anglais (6)

Credits

- Production
  - Elbow and Danny Evans (1)
  - Elbow (4,8,12)
  - Ben Hillier and Elbow (2,3,5,6,9,10)
  - Steve Osborne (7,11)
- Woodwind Arrangement on Track 6 - Ian Burdge and Elbow
- Recording
  - Danny Evans (1)
  - Ben Hillier (2,3,4,5,6,9,10,12)
  - Andrea Wright (2,3,4,5,6,9,10,12)
  - Elbow (3,8,9,12)
  - Steve Lloyd (4)
  - Ed Chadwick (6)
  - Danton Supple (7,11)
- Mixing
  - Danny Evans (1,8)
  - Ben Hillier (2,4,5,6,7,9,10,12)
  - Andrea Wright (2,4,5,6,7,9,10,12)
  - Ed Chadwick (6)
  - Steve Osborne (11)
  - Clare Lewis (11)
  - Bruno Ellington (11)
