= The Noisebox EP =

1999 EP by Elbow

EP by Elbow
- Released: January 1998
- Studio: Noisebox Studios
- Genre: Alternative rock
- Length: 24:51
- Label: Soft Records
- Producer: Elbow

Elbow chronology
The Noisebox EP (1998)	The Newborn EP (2000)

The Noisebox EP is Elbow's very first release and EP. It was a limited release on CD single, possibly as few a 50 copies, with 200 maximum. At the time, the band was still unsigned with any record label. It contains three early, original versions of songs ("Powder Blue", "Red" and "Can't Stop") that would be re-recorded and released on the full-length album Asleep in the Back, three years later.

The other two songs "George Lassoes the Moon" and "Theme from Munroe Kelly" were never released on any full-length album. However, a newer version of both tracks were released on The Any Day Now EP and the "Not a Job" DVD.

The simple black-and-white cover of the EP contains the recording info, copyrights, thank you notes, track listing and lyrics to "George Lassoes the Moon".

Tracks 1,2,4 and 5 from the EP are featured on a three-disc deluxe edition of Asleep in the Back, released on 26 October 2009. Track 3, "George Lassoes the Moon", was omitted from the deluxe edition and the release contained a live version of the song instead.

== Track listing ==
No.	Title	Length
1.	"Powder Blue"	4:36
2.	"Red"	3:30
3.	"George Lassoes the Moon"	6:37
4.	"Theme from Munroe Kelly"	5:48
5.	"Can't Stop"	4:20
