= Best High School =

Best High School may refer to:

- BEST High School (Kirkland, Washington), United States
- BEST High School, part of the McClymonds Educational Complex in Oakland, California, United States
- Advait Vidya Niketan [AVN], Bharuch Gujarat, India
