= Yūko Andō (news anchor) =

Japanese television presenter and news anchor (born 1958)

堤 優子 Yuko Tsutsumi
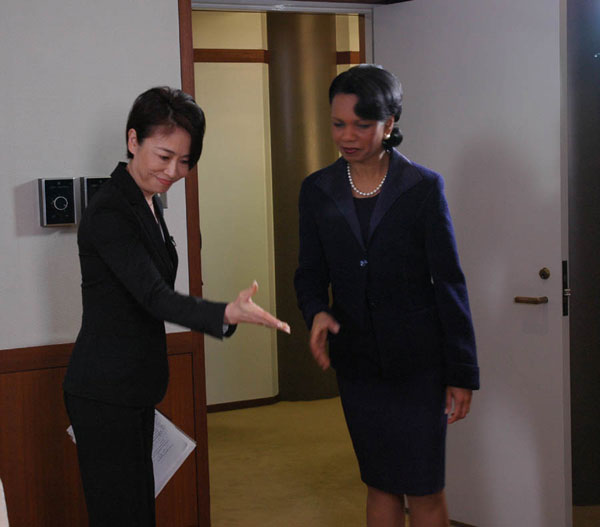
- Yuko Ando with U.S. Secretary of State Condoleezza Rice in March 2005
- Born: 安藤 優子 (Yūko Andō); 19 November 1958 (age 67); Ichikawa, Chiba, Japan
- Occupation: News anchor
- Notable credit: Super News
- Spouse: Koichi Tsutsumi (married 2006–present)

Yūko Andō (安藤 優子, Andō Yūko; born 19 November 1958) is a Japanese television presenter and news anchor. She has headed Fuji Television's Super News evening news programme alongside Tetsuo Suda since April 2000.

== Career ==
As a newscaster, Ando has presented the following Fuji TV evening news programmes since 1987.

- FNN Super Time (October 1987 – March 1994)
- News Japan (April 1994 – March 2000)
- Super News (April 2000 – )

During her career, she has interviewed many heads of state, including Philippine President Corazon Aquino, US President Bill Clinton, Philippine President Ferdinand Marcos, British Prime Minister Margaret Thatcher, and Polish President Lech Wałęsa.

== Personal life ==
Ando first married in December 1989, to an advertising agency employee, but divorced in March 1993. She remarried on 26 December 2006, to Koichi Tsutsumi (堤 康一), a Fuji TV producer with whom she had been in a relationship since 1996.

== See also ==
- Tarō Kimura (journalist), Super News commentator
