= Cast of Thousands =

2003 album by Elbow

Studio album by Elbow
- Released: 18 August 2003
- Recorded: 2002–2003
- Studio: Parr Street Studios, Liverpool
- Genre: Alternative rock; art rock; post-rock; dream pop; post-Britpop
- Length: 50:09
- Label: V2
- Producer: Ben Hillier, Elbow

Elbow chronology
Asleep in the Back (2001)	Cast of Thousands (2003)	Leaders of the Free World (2005)

Singles from Cast of Thousands
- 1. "Fallen Angel" Released: 4 August 2003; 2. "Fugitive Motel" Released: 27 October 2003; 3. "Not a Job" Released: 23 February 2004; 4. "Grace Under Pressure"/"Switching Off" Released: 12 July 2004

Cast of Thousands is the second studio album by English rock band Elbow, released on 18 August 2003 in the UK and on 27 January 2004 in the US by V2 Records. The album title refers to the song "Grace Under Pressure", whose refrain was recorded live at the Glastonbury Festival in 2002, as sung by the audience during the band's set. Participants were then invited to register their names at the Elbow website, with all responders gaining a 'credit' on the album sleeve. The US version of the album contains two additional songs: "Whisper Grass" (which was a B-side to first single "Fallen Angel") and "Lay Down Your Cross" (a B-side to third single "Not a Job"). The Japanese version includes "Whisper Grass" and "Brave New Shave" (another "Fallen Angel" B-side) as bonus tracks.

A companion film was also produced in conjunction with the album's release. It features footage set to all 11 tracks on the UK version of the album, as well as the music videos for the singles "Fallen Angel" and "Fugitive Motel". In the UK the film was released on DVD, whereas in the US it was released as an enhanced video bonus disc with the album.

== Album cover ==
The cover of Cast of Thousands was designed by art director Rob Crane, who cited Antony Gormley's installation The Field for the British Isles as inspiration. The two characters on the album cover were 10 feet (3.0 m) tall female and male polystyrene figures, named "Elle" and "Bo", which were originally placed by the side of the M1 motorway near Mansfield, but were removed by police following reported "alien" sightings by passing drivers. Following the conclusion of the promotional activities for the record, the models were auctioned for charity.

== Critical reception ==
Professional ratings
Aggregate scores
Source	Rating
Metacritic	84/100
Review scores
Source	Rating
AllMusic	3.5/5 stars
Entertainment Weekly	B+
The Guardian	4/5 stars
The Independent	4/5 stars
NME	9/10
Pitchfork	7.8/10
Q	4/5 stars
Rolling Stone	3/5 stars
Spin	A−
Uncut	4/5 stars

Cast of Thousands received critical acclaim upon release. On Metacritic, the album has a weighted average score of 84 out of 100 based on 23 reviews, indicating "universal acclaim".

== Track listing ==
=== UK version ===
All tracks are written by Elbow; all lyrics by Guy Garvey.

No.	Title	Length
1.	"Ribcage"	6:27
2.	"Fallen Angel"	4:07
3.	"Fugitive Motel"	5:51
4.	"Snooks (Progress Report)"	4:00
5.	"Switching Off"	5:05
6.	"Not a Job"	4:23
7.	"I've Got Your Number"	4:48
8.	"Buttons and Zips"	3:57
9.	"Crawling with Idiot"	4:41
10.	"Grace Under Pressure"	4:57
11.	"Flying Dream 143"	1:48

- "Snooks (Progress Report)" takes its name from blind blues singer and guitarist Snooks Eaglin

Japanese version bonus tracks

No.	Title	Length
12.	"Whisper Grass" (B-side of "Fallen Angel" CD1 in the UK)	4:29
13.	"Brave New Shave" (B-side of "Fallen Angel" CD2 in the UK)	3:47

=== US version ===
All tracks are written by Elbow; all lyrics by Guy Garvey.

No.	Title	Length
1.	"Ribcage"	6:27
2.	"Fallen Angel"	4:07
3.	"Fugitive Motel"	5:51
4.	"Snooks (Progress Report)"	4:00
5.	"Switching Off"	5:05
6.	"Not a Job"	4:23
7.	"I've Got Your Number"	4:48
8.	"Whisper Grass"	4:29
9.	"Buttons and Zips"	3:57
10.	"Lay Down Your Cross" (B-side of "Not a Job" in the UK)	4:40
11.	"Crawling with Idiot"	4:41
12.	"Grace Under Pressure"	4:57
13.	"Flying Dream 143"	1:48

=== Cast of Thousands film version ===
(released 3 November 2003 in UK, 27 January 2004 in US):

Disc one

As the standard album release in each country (11 tracks in UK, 13 tracks in US)

Disc two

(released as a DVD in UK, and as an enhanced CD-ROM in US)

No.	Title	Length
1.	"Video for "Fallen Angel"" (directed by Sam Brown)
2.	"Video for "Fugitive Motel"" (directed by Dave Mould)
3.	"Ribcage" (footage by Elbow)
4.	"Fallen Angel" (visuals by Soup Collective)
5.	"Fugitive Motel" (visuals by Soup Collective)
6.	"Snooks (Progress Report)" (visuals by Soup Collective)
7.	"Switching Off" (visuals by Soup Collective)
8.	"Not a Job" (photos by Mark Thomas)
9.	"I've Got Your Number" (footage by Elbow)
10.	"Buttons and Zips" (visuals by Soup Collective)
11.	"Crawling with Idiot" (photos by Mark Thomas)
12.	"Grace Under Pressure" (footage by Elbow & visuals by Soup Collective)
13.	"Flying Dream 143" (visuals by Soup Collective)

== Singles ==
In the UK, there were four singles released from the album:

- "Ribcage" was released as an online track in May 2003 but was never a full single.
- "Fallen Angel" (4 August 2003)
- "Fugitive Motel" (27 October 2003)
- "Not a Job" (23 February 2004)
- "Grace Under Pressure"/"Switching Off" EP (12 July 2004)

== Additional musicians ==
- Additional vocals on "Ribcage" - The London Community Gospel Choir
- Strings on "Fugitive Motel" and "Crawling with Idiot" (arranged by Ian Burdge):
  - Ian Burdge, Chris Worsey - cello
  - Stephen Bussey, Catherine Browning, Everton Nelson, Maya Bickel, Alison Dods, Gillon Cameron, Giles Broadbent & Sally Herbert - violins
- Additional vocals on "Grace Under Pressure" - The London Community Gospel Choir, Jimi Goodwin, Alfie, Marcus Garvey, Beckie Garvey, Gina Garvey, Cathy Davey & the crowd at Glastonbury 2002 (Marcus, Beckie and Gina Garvey are singer Guy Garvey's brother and sisters)
