= All My Best =

All My Best may refer to:

== Music ==
=== Albums ===
- All My Best, by Roger Whittaker
- All My Best, by Mickey Gilley (1982)
- All My Best (Ricky Nelson album), a studio album re-recording of old hits (1985)
- All My Best, by Burl Ives (1995)
- All My Best, by Scott Wesley Brown (2004)
- All My Best, by Dave Cloud (2004)
- All My Best (Mai Kuraki album), a Japanese compilation album (2009)
- All My Best by Onnik Dinkjian
- All My Best by Hagood Hardy (2004)

=== Songs ===
- "All My Best (Sweet Mary)", song by Christine Ohlman as Fancy, written by Richard Gerstein (1970)
