= Leaders of the Free World =

2005 album by Elbow

Studio album by Elbow
- Released: 12 September 2005
- Recorded: 2004–2005
- Studio: Blueprint Studios, Salford, Greater Manchester
- Genre: Alternative rock, art rock
- Length: 49:32
- Label: V2
- Producer: Elbow

Elbow chronology
Cast of Thousands (2003)	Leaders of the Free World (2005)	The Seldom Seen Kid (2008)

Singles from Leaders of the Free World
- 1. "Forget Myself" Released: 29 August 2005; 2. "Leaders of the Free World" Released: 7 November 2005

Professional ratings
Aggregate scores
Source	Rating
Metacritic	78/100
Review scores
Source	Rating
AllMusic	4/5 stars
The A.V. Club	A−
Entertainment Weekly	A−
The Guardian	4/5 stars
The Independent	3/5 stars
NME	9/10
Pitchfork	6.2/10
Q	4/5 stars
Rolling Stone	2/5 stars
Spin	A−

Leaders of the Free World is the third studio album by English rock band Elbow, released on 12 September 2005 in the UK and 21 February 2006 in the US on the V2 record label. The Japanese version of the album (released on 7 September 2005) features two bonus tracks, "McGreggor" and "The Good Day", which were both B-sides to the first single "Forget Myself". Leaders of the Free World was entirely produced by the band at Blueprint Studios in Salford, Greater Manchester, a space the band hired for the duration of their recording sessions. The album reached number 12 on the British albums chart.

The band teamed up with video artists The Soup Collective to produce an integrated music and video DVD to accompany the album. In the UK there was a limited edition release of the CD and the DVD in a gatefold sleeve. When released in the US, initial limited copies contained the bonus DVD (with alternatively-colored green artwork).

The song "Mexican Standoff" was also recorded in Spanish. This version appears as a B-side to the "Leaders of the Free World" single.

== Album cover ==
The album cover is highly reminiscent of the 1976 album A Trick of the Tail by Genesis, a group which is a major influence on Elbow frontman Guy Garvey. However this is completely coincidental, because the cover's designer had not seen the Genesis cover art prior to designing it. The album cover depicts five characters from the songs on the album itself:

1. The ticket conductor from the train in "Station Approach" (or possibly the bus conductor in "Great Expectations").
2. The bouncer ("the man at the door") from "Forget Myself". During "An Imagined Affair", Garvey sings "I drink until the doorman is a Christmas tree" possibly meaning the same character.
3. The man "kicking up mischief" and drinking from "Picky Bugger" (or possibly the man who drinks "until the doorman is a Christmas tree" in "An Imagined Affair").
4. A Mexican, from "Mexican Standoff".
5. A man needing patching up, with tea and a bicycle pump, as in "Puncture Repair".

== Track listing ==
All tracks are written by Elbow; all lyrics by Guy Garvey.

No.	Title	Length
1.	"Station Approach"	4:22
2.	"Picky Bugger"	3:07
3.	"Forget Myself"	5:22
4.	"The Stops"	5:03
5.	"Leaders of the Free World"	6:11
6.	"An Imagined Affair"	4:43
7.	"Mexican Standoff"	4:01
8.	"The Everthere"	4:13
9.	"My Very Best"	5:33
10.	"Great Expectations"	5:05
11.	"Puncture Repair"	1:48

=== Japanese version ===
All tracks are written by Elbow; all lyrics by Guy Garvey.

No.	Title	Length
1.	"Station Approach"	4:22
2.	"Picky Bugger"	3:07
3.	"McGreggor"	2:49
4.	"Forget Myself"	5:22
5.	"The Stops"	5:03
6.	"Leaders of the Free World"	6:11
7.	"An Imagined Affair"	4:43
8.	"Mexican Standoff"	4:01
9.	"The Everthere"	4:13
10.	"The Good Day"	3:41
11.	"My Very Best"	5:33
12.	"Great Expectations"	5:05
13.	"Puncture Repair"	1:48

=== DVD ===
No.	Title	Length
1.	"Station Approach"	5:09
2.	"Mexican Standoff"	5:45
3.	"The Everthere"	4:18
4.	"The Stops"	5:26
5.	"Leaders of the Free World"	6:34
6.	"Picky Bugger"	3:02
7.	"McGreggor"	2:38
8.	"Great Expectations"	7:17
9.	"Forget Myself"	7:00
10.	"Puncture Repair"	3:36

== Singles ==
In the UK, there were two singles released from the album:

- "Forget Myself" (29 August 2005)
- "Leaders of the Free World" (7 November 2005)

== Additional musicians ==
- Alexis Smith and Jason Boshoff - additional programming on "Forget Myself", "Leaders of the Free World" and "My Very Best"
- Jote Osahn and Stella Page - strings on "Forget Myself" and "My Very Best"
  - Strings arranged by Elbow, additional arrangement by Marius de Vries
- Dylan Jupp - laughter on "Mexican Standoff"
