= Tarō Kimura (journalist) =

Japanese veteran journalist (born 1938)

- Born: Tarō Kimura; 12 February 1938 (age 88); Berkeley, California, USA
- Occupations: Newscaster, journalist
- Notable credit: Super News

Tarō Kimura (木村 太郎, Kimura Tarō; born 12 February 1938 in Berkeley, California, USA) is a Japanese veteran journalist who provides commentary and analysis with Yūko Andō on Japan's Fuji Television Super News. He is also the managing director of Shonan Beach FM, a community radio station.

== Biography ==
Kimura moved with his family to New York soon after he was born, but had to return to Japan just before World War II broke out. His father was interned at Ellis Island.

Kimura majored in political science at Keio University.

== Career ==
After graduating from university, in 1964, Kimura started work as a journalist at NHK. At NHK, he presented the evening news programme News Center Nine ("NC9") together with Midori Miyazaki from 1982 until 1988.

Subsequent overseas postings included Beirut (1974–1976), Geneva (1976–1978), and Washington, D.C. (1980–1982). Kimura was awarded the Hoso-Bunka Foundation Prize in 1986 for outstanding performance in newscasting, and the Vaughn-Ueda Prize in 1988, an award presented to the journalist whose works contribute to promoting international understanding.

In 1989, he moved from NHK to join Fuji TV.

In the course of his work, Kimura has interviewed notable figures such as Ugandan dictator Idi Amin and U.S. President George W. Bush.

In addition to his appearances on Super News, Kimura writes weekly columns for Chunichi Newspaper and Tokyo Headlines.

== Bibliography ==
- Nyusu e no chosen (ニュースへの挑戦, "Challenges Facing Newscasting"), 1988, NHK Shuppan, ISBN 978-4140086063
- Nihon no Sentaku (日本の選択), 1995, Kinema-junposha, ISBN 978-4873761510
- Shacho no tame no IT kakumei (社長のためのIT革命, Information Technology for CEO), 2000, Bungeisha, ISBN 978-4835513980
