= Gekkeikan =

Japanese sake manufacturer

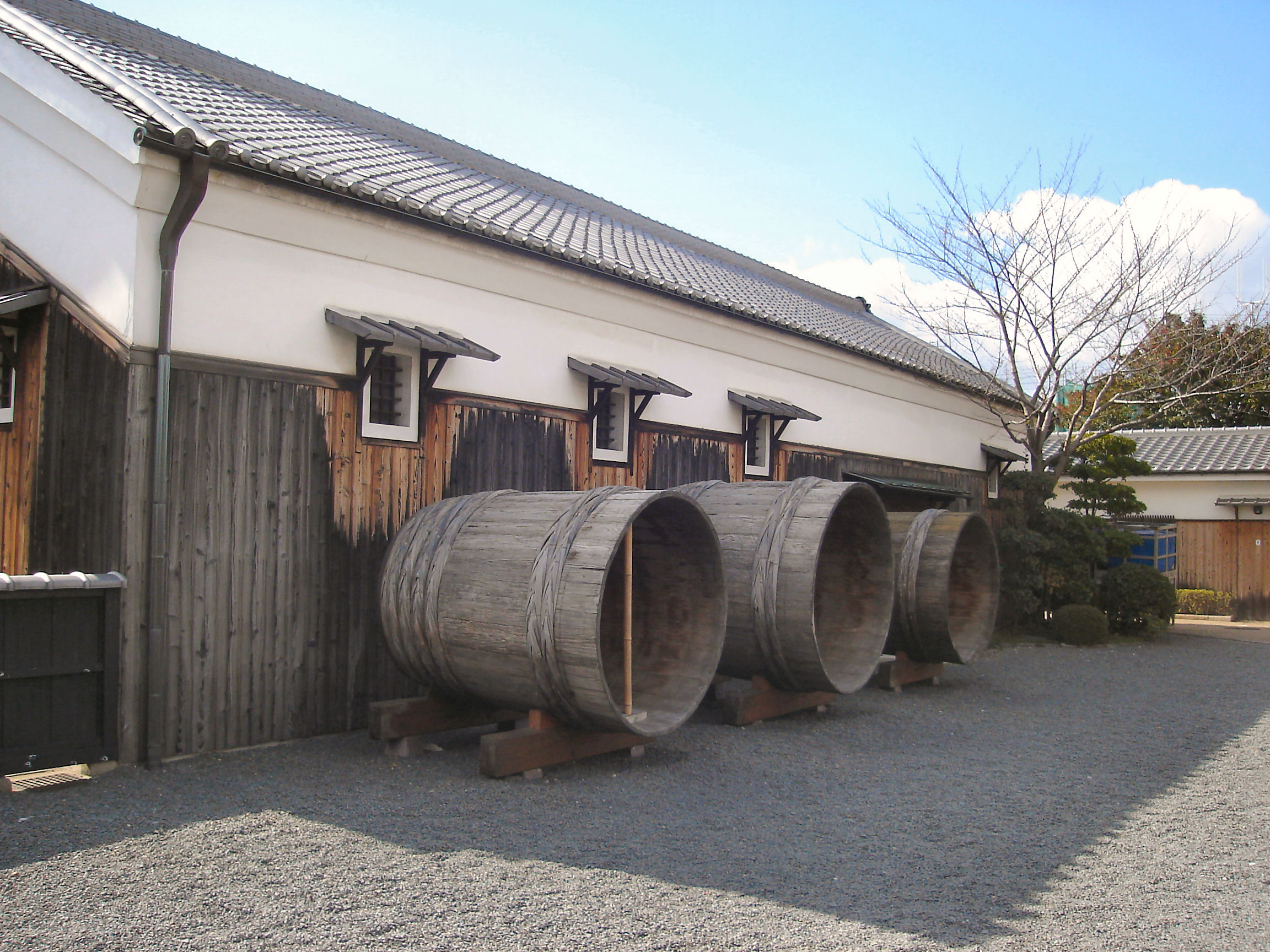
Sake barrels outside the Gekkeikan Ōkura Memorial Hall

Gekkeikan Sake Company, Ltd. (月桂冠株式会社, Gekkeikan Kabushikigaisha) is a Japanese manufacturer of sake and plum wine based in Fushimi, Kyoto, Japan. Founded in 1637 by Jiemon Ōkura, in Fushimi, it is one of the world's oldest companies, and is a member of the Henokiens group. The name of the company literally means "laurel wreath".

Gekkeikan's United States subsidiary, Gekkeikan Sake (USA), Inc., is located in Folsom, California. The company controls approximately 25% of the American sake market.
