= The Newborn EP =

EP by Elbow
- Released: 7 August 2000
- Recorded: 1999–2000
- Genre: Alternative rock
- Length: 21:53
- Label: Ugly Man
- Producer: Elbow

Elbow chronology
The Noisebox EP (1999)	The Newborn EP (2000)	The Any Day Now EP (2001)

The Newborn EP is Elbow's second release. This EP was released through Elbow's first record label Ugly Man Records. Two songs ("Newborn" and "Bitten by the Tailfly") were later included on their first full-length album Asleep in the Back with a longer version containing a different mix of "Bitten by the Tailfly" being used for the album.

"Kisses" and the radio edit of "Newborn" are only available on this EP, although "None One" is also available on their following The Any Day Now EP, "Newborn" CD1 and Dead in the Boot.

== Track listing ==
1. "Newborn" – 7:32
2. "Kisses" – 2:07
3. "Bitten by the Tailfly" – 5:13
4. "None One" – 3:45
5. "Newborn" (Radio Edit) – 3:16
