= John Leckie production discography =

John Leckie is an English record producer and recording engineer.

== 1970s ==
Year	Artist	Title	Label	Work	Ref
1970	George Harrison	All Things Must Pass	Apple	Tape Operator	
1970	John Lennon	John Lennon/Plastic Ono Band	Apple	Tape Operator	
1970	Yoko Ono	Yoko Ono/Plastic Ono Band	Apple	Tape Operator	
1970	Lon & Derrek Van Eaton	Tracks	Apple	Tape Operator	
1970	Derek and the Dominos	Tracks	RSO	Tape Operator	
1970	Argent	"Hold Your Head Up" (single)	CBS	Tape Operator	
1970	Roy Harper	Stormcock	Universal / EMI	Tape Operator	
1970	Syd Barrett	Barrett	Universal / EMI	Tape Operator	
1970	Paul McCartney	McCartney (tracks)	Apple / EMI	Tape Operator	
1970	Barclay James Harvest	Once Again	Universal / EMI	Tape Operator	
1971	Pink Floyd	Meddle	Universal / EMI	Tape Operator/Engineer	
1971	Edgar Broughton Band	Edgar Broughton Band	Universal / EMI	Tape Operator/Engineer	
1971	Kevin Ayers	Shooting at the Moon	Universal / EMI	Tape Operator	
1971	Sir Adrian Boult	Beethoven Symphonies	EMI / His Master's Voice	Tape Operator	
1972	Roy Harper	Lifemask	Universal / EMI	Engineer/Mixer	
1972	Paul McCartney/Wings	Red Rose Speedway (tracks)	Apple	Engineer	
1972	Paul McCartney/Wings	"Hi, Hi, Hi" / "C-Moon" (single)	Apple	Engineer	
1972	Fela Kuti and Afro 70	Live at Abbey Road	Universal / EMI	Tape Operator	
1972	Ornette Coleman	Skies of America	Sony / RCA	Tape Operator	
1972	Harry Mortimer	Massed Brass Bands	Universal / EMI	Tape Operator	
1973	Roy Harper	Valentine	Universal / EMI	Engineer/Mixer	
1973	Chris Spedding	The Only Lick I Know	Universal / EMI	Engineer/Mixer	
1973	Kayak	Kayak	EMI / Holland	Engineer/Mixer	
1973	Shoot	On the Frontier	Universal / EMI	Engineer/Mixer	
1973	Mott the Hoople	Mott	Sony / CBS	Engineer	
1973	Robin Trower	Tracks	Chrysalis	Engineer	
1973	Monti De Lyle	"The Yum Yum Song"	Universal / EMI	Engineer	
1973	Lucio Battisti	Il Nostro Caro Angelo	Numero Uno / Italy	Mixer	
1973	Wizzard	Jazz	Universal / EMI	Engineer/Mixer	
1974	The Frenchies	Lola Cola	EMI / France	Mixer	
1974	Roy Harper	Flashes from the Archives of Oblivion	Universal / EMI	Engineer/Mixer	
1974	Be-Bop Deluxe	Axe Victim	Universal / EMI	Engineer/Mixer	
1974	Jack Rieley	Western Justice	EMI / Holland	Engineer/Mixer	
1974	Mirror	Secret Convention	Cipiti / Italy	Engineer/Mixer	
1974	Rinky Dink & Crystal Set	Cameo Roles	Universal / EMI	Engineer/Mixer	
1975	Be-Bop Deluxe	Sunburst Finish	Universal / EMI	Producer/Engineer	
1975	Doctors of Madness	Figments of Emancipation	Universal / Polydor	Producer/Engineer	
1975	Steve Harley	Timeless Flight	Universal / EMI	Engineer/Mixer	
1975	Roy Harper	HQ	Universal / EMI	Engineer/Mixer	
1975	Sharks	Jab It in Yore Eye	Island	Engineer/Mixer	
1975	Pink Floyd	Wish You Were Here	Universal / EMI	Engineer	
1975	Syd Barrett	Last recordings/Unreleased	Universal / EMI	Engineer	
1976	Gryphon	Treason	Universal / EMI	Engineer/Mixer	
1976	Be-Bop Deluxe	Modern Music	Universal / EMI	Producer/Engineer	
1976	XTC	3D EP	Universal / Virgin	Producer/Engineer	
1976	Soft Machine	Softs	Universal / EMI	Engineer/Mixer	
1976	T. Rex	"The London Boys" (single)	BBC / TOTP	Engineer/Mixer	
1976	Eddie Jobson	"Yesterday Boulevard" (single)	Universal / Island	Engineer	
1976	Sonny Okosun	Fire in Soweto	EMI / Nigeria	Engineer/Mixer	
1977	Be-Bop Deluxe	Drastic Plastic	Universal / EMI	Producer/Engineer/Mixer	
1977	XTC	White Music	Universal / Virgin	Producer/Engineer/Mixer	
1977	The Adverts	Crossing the Red Sea with the Adverts	Anchor / Bright	Producer/Engineer/Mixer	
1977	Roy Harper	Bullinamingvase	Universal / EMI	Producer/Engineer/Mixer	
1977	Advertising	Advertising Jingles	Universal / EMI	Engineer/Mixer	
1977	Sammy Hagar	Sammy Hagar	Capitol / USA	Engineer/Mixer	
1978	XTC	Go 2	Universal / Virgin	Producer/Engineer/Mixer	
1978	Magazine	"Touch & Go" / "Goldfinger" (single)	Universal / Virgin	Producer/Engineer/Mixer	
1978	Magazine	Real Life	Universal / Virgin	Producer/Engineer/Mixer	
1978	Simple Minds	Life in a Day	Arista	Producer/Engineer/Mixer	
1978	Be-Bop Deluxe	Live in the Air Age	Universal / EMI	Producer/Engineer/Mixer	
1978	Public Image Ltd	"Public Image" (single)	Universal / Virgin	Engineer	
1978	XTC	Live at The Hope and Anchor (tracks)	Warners UK	Producer/Engineer/Mixer	
1978	Skids	"Masquerade" (double single)	Universal / Virgin	Producer/Engineer/Mixer	
1978	Roger McGough	Summer with Monica	Universal / Island	Producer/Engineer/Mixer	
1978	Sonny Okosun Ozziddi	Holy Wars	EMI / Nigera	Engineer/Mixer	
1978	Wilko Johnson	Solid Senders	Universal / Virgin	Engineer/Mixer	
1979	Simple Minds	Real to Real Cacophony	Universal / Virgin	Producer/Engineer/Mixer	
1979	Human League	Holiday '80 (EP)	Universal / Virgin	Producer/Engineer/Mixer	
1979	Bill Nelson's Red Noise	Sound-on-Sound	EMI / Harvest	Producer/Engineer/Mixer	
1979	The Doll	Listen to the Silence	Beggar's Banquet	Producer/Engineer/Mixer	
1979	The Cut Outs	D.I.Y. (EP)	Universal / EMI	Producer/Engineer/Mixer	
1979	After the Fire	Laser Love (tracks)	Sony / CBS	Producer/Engineer	
1979	Music for Pleasure	"Fuel to the Fire" (single)	Rage / DJM	Producer/Engineer/Mixer	
1979	City	Dreamland	Pool / Berlin	Mixer	

== 1980s ==
Year	Artist	Title	Label	Work	Ref
1980	Simple Minds	Empires and Dance	Universal / Virgin	Producer/Engineer/Mixer	
1980	The Tapes	On a Clear Day	Passport USA	Producer/Engineer/Mixer	
1980	The Proof	First Rate	Sony / Nemperor	Producer/Engineer/Mixer	
1980	Andy Partridge	Take Away / The Lure of Salvage	Universal / Virgin	Producer/Engineer/Mixer	
1980	The Cuban Heels	Work Our Way to Heaven	Universal / Virgin	Producer/Engineer/Mixer	
1980	The Associates	Australia/Me Myself (tracks)	BMG / Fiction	Producer/Engineer	
1980	Endgames	"Futures Looking Fine" (single)	Universal / Phonogram	Producer/Engineer/Mixer	
1981	The Atrix	The Atrix	Scoff	Producer/Engineer/Mixer	
1981	De Press	Block to Block	Sonet / Norway	Producer/Engineer/Mixer	
1981	The Cut	Shadow Talks	Sonet / Norway	Producer/Engineer/Mixer	
1981	EMI Lagos	Various Artists	EMI / Nigeria	Engineer/Mixer	
1981	Bill Nelson	Quit Dreaming and Get on the Beam	Universal / Phonogram	Producer/Engineer/Mixer	
1982	De Press	Product	Sonet / Norway	Producer/Engineer/Mixer	
1982	Holy Toy	Perfect Day	Sonet / Norway	Producer/Engineer/Mixer	
1982	Roy Harper	Work of Heart	Science Friction	Producer/Engineer	
1982	Unity	Heat Your Body Up	Universal / Charisma	Producer/Engineer/Mixer	
1982	The Lost Jockey	Professor Slack	Rough Trade	Producer/Engineer/Mixer	
1982	Bill Nelson	The Love That Whirls (Diary of a Thinking Heart)	Universal / Phonogram	Engineer/Mixer	
1982	Morgan Fisher	Seasons	Cherry Red	Producer/Engineer/Mixer	
1984	The Fall	The Wonderful and Frightening World of...	Beggars Banquet	Producer/Engineer/Mixer	
1984	Felt	The Strange Idols Pattern and Other Short Stories	Cherry Red	Producer/Engineer/Mixer	
1984	Lulu Kiss Me Dead	"Ultimate Solution" (single)	Beggar's Banquet	Producer/Engineer/Mixer	
1984	The Woodentops	"Move Me" (single)	Rough Trade	Engineer/Mixer	
1985	The Fall	This Nation's Saving Grace	Beggars Banquet	Producer/Engineer/Mixer	
1985	Gene Loves Jezebel	Immigrant	Beggars Banquet	Producer/Engineer/Mixer	
1985	The Woodentops	It Will Come	Rough Trade	Producer/Engineer/Mixer	
1985	The Dukes of Stratosphear	25 O'Clock (EP)	Universal / Virgin	Producer/Engineer/Mixer	
1985	The Fall	Cruiser's Creek (EP)	Beggar's Banquet	Producer/Engineer/Mixer	
1985	The Adult Net	Incense and Peppermints	Beggar's Banquet	Producer/Engineer/Mixer	
1985	Zero Le Creche	"Falling" (single)	Cherry Red	Producer/Engineer/Mixer	
1986	The Fall	Bend Sinister	Beggar's Banquet	Producer/Engineer/Mixer	
1986	The Adult Net	"Edie" (single)	Beggar's Banquet	Producer/Engineer/Mixer	
1986	The Adult Net	"Stars Say Go" (single)	Beggar's Banquet	Producer/Engineer/Mixer	
1986	The Lucy Show	Mania	Universal / A&M	Producer/Engineer	
1986	The Doctor's Children	King Buffalo	Upright	Producer/Engineer/Mixer	
1986	Bill Nelson	Getting the Holy Ghost Across	Portrait / Cocteau	Engineer	
1987	The Dukes of Stratosphear	Psonic Psunspot	Universal / Virgin	Producer/Engineer/Mixer	
1987	Marc Seberg	Lumiere & Traisons	Universal / Virgin	Producer/Engineer/Mixer	
1987	Let's Active	Every Dog Has His Day	IRS / USA	Producer/Engineer/Mixer	
1987	The Wake	Something That No One Else Could Bring (EP)	Factory	Producer/Engineer/Mixer	
1987	Thirst	Riding the Times (EP)	Rough Trade	Producer/Engineer/Mixer	
1987	That Petrol Emotion	"Genius Move" (single)	Universal / Virgin	Mixer	
1987	Philip Boa & Voodoo Club	Copperfield	Polydor / Germany	Producer/Engineer/Mixer	
1988	The La's	5 tracks	Universal / Go! Discs	Producer/Engineer/Mixer	
1988	James Varda	Hunger	Murmur Records	Producer/Engineer/Mixer	
1988	The Stone Roses	"Elephant Stone" (single)	Sony / Silvertone	Mixer	
1988	Felt	Space Blues	Sony / Creation	Producer/Engineer/Mixer	
1988	House of Freaks	Tantilla	Rhino / USA	Producer/Engineer/Mixer	
1988	The Stone Roses	The Stone Roses	Sony / Silvertone	Producer/Engineer/Mixer	
1989	The Stone Roses	"Fools Gold"	Sony / Silvertone	Producer/Engineer/Mixer	
1989	Marc Seberg	Le Bout Des Nerfs	Virgin / France	Producer/Engineer/Mixer	

== 1990s ==
Year	Artist	Title	Label	Work	Ref
1990	The Stone Roses	"One Love" (single)	Sony / Silvertone	Producer/Engineer/Mixer	
1990	The Posies	Dear 23	Geffen / USA	Producer/Engineer/Mixer	
1990	Trashcan Sinatras	Cake	Universal / Go Discs	Producer/Engineer/Mixer	
1990	The Lilac Time	& Love for All	Universal / Fontana	Producer/Engineer/Mixer	
1990	Five Thirty	"Air Conditioned Nightmare" (single)	East West	Mixer	
1990	Shiny Gnomes	Colliding (tracks)	Polydor / Germany	Producer	
1990	XTC	Explode Together: The Dub Experiments 78-80	Universal / Virgin	Producer/Mixer	
1990	Brix Smith	"Hurdy Gurdy Man" (single)	Universal / Fontana	Producer/Engineer/Mixer	
1991	The Silencers	Dance to the Holy Man	Sony / RCA	Producer	
1991	The Grapes of Wrath	These Days	Capitol / Canada	Producer/Engineer/Mixer	
1991	Thee Hypnotics	Soul, Glitter & Sin	Situation Two	Producer/Engineer/Mixer	
1991	Denim	Back in Denim	Universal / London	Producer/Engineer	
1992	The Stone Roses	Second Coming (tracks)	Geffen	Producer/Engineer	
1992	Ashkhabad	City of Love	Real World	Producer/Engineer/Mixer	
1992	Robyn Hitchcock & Egyptians	Respect	Universal / A&M	Producer/Engineer/Mixer	
1992	J. (Jaye Muller)	We Are the Majority	Polydor / France	Mixer	
1993	The Verve	A Storm in Heaven	Universal / Virgin	Producer/Engineer/Mixer	
1993	Ride	Carnival of Light	Creation	Producer/Mixer	
1993	Ian McNabb	Go My Own Way (EP)	This Way Up	Producer/Engineer	
1994	Radiohead	The Bends	Warners / EMI	Producer/Engineer/Mixer	
1994	Elastica	Elastica (tracks)	Universal / Geffen	Mixer	
1995	Cast	All Change	Universal / Polydor	Producer/Engineer/Mixer	
1996	Richard Ashcroft	Urban Hymns (demos)	Universal / Virgin	Producer/Engineer/Mixer	
1996	Kula Shaker	K	Sony / Columbia	Producer/Engineer/Mixer	
1996	Mark Owen	Green Man	Sony / RCA	Producer/Mixer	
1996	The Gyres	"Pop Cop" (single)	Sugar	Producer	
1996	Ether	He Say Yeah (single)	Universal / Regal	Producer	
1996	Scarlet	Chemistry	Warner Bros.	Producer/Mixer	
1996	Spiritualized	Ladies and Gentlemen We Are Floating in Space	Dedicated	Mixer	
1997	Cast	Mother Nature Calls	Universal / Polydor	Producer/Engineer	
1997	Dr. John	Anutha Zone	Warners / Parlophone	Producer/Mixer	
1998	Cowboy Junkies	Miles from Our Home	Geffen / Canada	Producer	
1998	Papa Wemba	Molokai	Real World	Producer/Mixer	
1998	Shivkumar Sharma	Raga Janasammohini	Real World	Producer/Mixer	
1998	Roy Harper	The Dream Society	Science Friction	Engineer	
1998	Finley Quaye	"Ultra Stimulation" (single)	Sony / Epic	Producer/Mixer	
1999	Relish	Wildflowers (tracks)	EMI / Ireland	Producer/Engineer	
1999	Six By Seven	The Closer You Get	Mantra	Producer/Mixer	
1999	Muse	Showbiz LP	Taste / Mushroom	Producer/Mixer	
1999	Suns of Arqa	Cosmic Jugalbandi	Arka Sound	Mixer	
1999	Rizwan-Muazzam Qawwali	Sacrifice to Love	Real World	Producer/Mixer	

== 2000s ==
Year	Artist	Title	Label	Work	Ref
2000	Muse	Origin of Symmetry	Taste / Mushroom	Producer	
2000	Gopal Shankar Misra	Out of Stillness	Real World	Producer/Engineer/Mixer	
2000	Baaba Maal	Missing You	Palm Pictures	Producer/Engineer/Mixer	
2001	One Minute Silence	One Lie Fits All	Taste	Producer/Mixer	
2001	Suede	"Positivity" (single)	Nude / Sony	Producer	
2001	Andy White	Andy White	Thirsty Ear	Producer/Engineer/Mixer	
2001	Los Lobos	Good Morning Aztlán	Mammoth / USA	Producer/Mixer	
2002	The Bandits	"The Warning" (single)	B-Unique	Producer/Mixer	
2002	Hamell on Trial	Tough Love	Righteous Babe	Producer/Engineer/Mixer	
2002	JJ72	"Always and Forever" (single)	Lakota	Mixer	
2002	Ravi	The Afro Indian Project	Arc Music	Producer/Engineer/Mixer	
2002	John Power	Happening for Love	Eagle Rock	Producer/Engineer/Mixer	
2003	Starsailor	Silence Is Easy (tracks)	Universal / EMI	Producer/Engineer/Mixer	
2004	Longwave	There's a Fire	RCA / USA	Producer/Mixer	
2004	My Computer	No CV	Gut	Producer/Mixer	
2004	New Order	Waiting for the Sirens' Call (tracks)	Warners	Producer	
2004	The Blockheads	Where's the Party?	Blockhead	Producer/Engineer	
2005	My Morning Jacket	Z	ATO / Sony / USA	Producer/Engineer/Mixer	
2005	Rodrigo y Gabriela	Rodrigo y Gabriela	Rubyworks / ATO	Producer/Engineer/Mixer	
2006	Fear of Music	Fast, Faster, Fastest (EP)	Sony / BMG	Producer/Engineer/Mixer	
2006	Andy White	Garage Band	Floating World	Mixer	
2006	Tiny Dancers	Free School Milk	Parlophone	Producer	
2007	Scott Matthews	Strings Sessions (EP)	Universal / Island	Producer/Engineer/Mixer	
2007	Doves	"Winter Hill" / "10:03" / "Push Me On"	Heavenly / EMI	Producer	
2007	The Troubadours	"Gimme Love" (single)	Mod Art Sounds	Producer/Engineer/Mixer	
2007	Baaba Maal	Television	Palm Pictures	Producer	
2008	Sergeant	Sergeant	Universal / Mercury	Producer/Mixer	
2008	India Soundpad	4 Bands from India	British Council	Producer/Mixer	
2009	Dean Dyson	The Doghouse Sessions	Dyson Records	Producer/Mixer	
2009	Rodrigo y Gabriela	11:11 (tracks)	Rubyworks / ATO	Producer/Engineer	
2009	Portico Quartet	Isla	Real World	Producer/Mixer	

== 2010s ==
Year	Artist	Title	Label	Work	Ref
2010	The Coral	Butterfly House	Sony / Cooperative	Producer/Mixer	
2010	Bellowhead	Hedonism	Navigator	Producer/Mixer	
2011	Cast	Troubled Times	Absolute	Producer/Engineer/Mixer	
2012	Bellowhead	Broadside	Navigator	Producer/Mixer	
2013	Novastar	Inside Outside	Parlophone / Benelux	Producer/Mixer	
2014	Palma Violets	Danger in the Club	Rough Trade	Producer/Mixer	
2018	Levellers	We the Collective	On the Fiddle	Producer/Engineer/Mixer	
2019	Doctors of Madness	Dark Times	Cherry Bomb Records	Producer/Engineer/Mixer	

== Sources ==
- Ford, Simon. Hip Priest: The Story of Mark E.Smith and the Fall. London: Quartet Books, 2002. ISBN 978-0-7043-8167-4
