= Quit Dreaming and Get on the Beam =

Studio album by Bill Nelson
- Released: May 1981
- Recorded: February – June 1979
- Studio: The Mobile Studio, Yorkshire; RAK, London
- Genre: New wave
- Length: 50:49
- Label: Mercury
- Producer: Bill Nelson; John Leckie

Bill Nelson chronology
Sound-on-Sound (1979)	Quit Dreaming and Get on the Beam (1981)	Das Kabinett (the Cabinet of Dr. Caligari) (1981)

Singles from Quit Dreaming...
- 1. "Do You Dream in Colour?" Released: May 1980; 2. "Banal" Released: March 1981; 3. "Youth of Nation on Fire" Released: May 1981; 4. "Living in My Limousine" Released: 1981

Quit Dreaming and Get on the Beam is the second studio album by English musician Bill Nelson. The album was released in May 1981 and was produced by Nelson and John Leckie. It is the first in a trilogy of albums with Mercury Records, including The Love That Whirls... (1982) and Chimera (1983), and is his first solo album in a decade since Northern Dream in 1971.

Originally intended as the second album by Bill Nelson's Red Noise, Quit Dreaming... follows a period of uncertainty for Nelson after Red Noise was dropped by EMI Records. Despite being released nearly two years after its recording, it reached no. 7 in the UK albums chart, the highest position of any of Bill Nelson's projects to date.

== Background and recording ==
Recording for Quit Dreaming and Get on the Beam commenced in February 1979, the same month of release as Sound-on-Sound, with the intention of being Red Noise's second album. EMI had shown signs of dissatisfaction with the band's material, and with the added element of change in the corporate structure, the label decided to drop multiple artists from their roster, Red Noise and Wire among them.

In a November 1981 interview for the Trouser Press, Nelson described the difficulties he faced:

EMI was being taken over, nobody was secure, and my management said, 'Hit singles; ignore that arty stuff.' I wrote 'Living in My Limousine' but I didn't like it; I thought it too much of a compromise. I took it to them and said, 'Here's the only commercial song you'll get.' They said it wasn't obvious enough, that it should be more banal. So I wrote 'Banal,' which is about using all these musical cliches and hating them. They were delighted: it sounded so commercial, but it had a subversive message. Unfortunately, when it came to being played on the radio ... we were told programmers didn't like its air of cynicism.

It would be roughly two years until the album would be released, with Nelson dropping the Red Noise moniker, making the record his first solo album since 1971's Northern Dream. In the interim, the single "Do You Dream in Colour?" was released on his personal label Cocteau Records, which required him to buy the master tapes from EMI, who owned the material recorded while he was still signed to them. Originally intended as a standalone single, Mercury would later include it on the album. The tracks "Life Runs Out Like Sand" and "Disposable" were recorded in London at RAK Studios with the remainder taking place at the Rolling Stones Mobile Studio in Yorkshire. Nelson had previously used the latter studio to partially record Be-Bop Deluxe's final album Drastic Plastic (1978).

== Promotion and release ==
Quit Dreaming... peaked at no. 7 in the UK, while the singles "Do You Dream in Colour?" and "Youth of Nation on Fire" peaked at no. 52 and 73 in the UK, respectively.

The first ten thousand copies included, at no extra cost, an additional instrumental album entitled Sounding the Ritual Echo (Atmospheres for Dreaming).

== Critical reception ==
Professional ratings
Review scores
Source	Rating
The Encyclopedia of Popular Music	4/5 stars
The Great Rock Discography	9/10
The Guardian	4/5 stars
Record Mirror	3.5/5 stars
Smash Hits	8/10
Uncut	8/10

In a contemporary review for Smash Hits, music journalist and occasional presenter of The Old Grey Whistle Test David Hepworth wrote "Although this album was recorded two years ago, it's not remotely dated; the man's mating of guitar-based powerglide rock and unfussy disco-tinged rhythm has rarely been heard to better effect." Mark Total of Record Mirror believed that, when comparing Nelson's work to the transition from Be-Bop Deluxe to Nelson's Red Noise, his solo efforts showed a more "distinct progression"; they also felt that, despite praise towards the instrumentation, the vocal delivery contributed to an overall "coldness" in the record, concluding "that it takes a great deal of time to get familiar with it."

David Peschek of the Guardian felt that in retrospect, Quit Dreaming... is the best of the Mercury trilogy, describing the album as "an extremely odd record, ... a kind of manic, Eno-esque meta-pop." In the September 2025 issue of Uncut, Terry Staunton called it "Commercial but subversive," comparing "its sly, arty rhythms" to the likes of Talking Heads.

== Legacy ==
Since its release, Quit Dreaming... remains Bill Nelson's highest-charting album in his native UK, including all albums by Be-Bop Deluxe and Red Noise. Excluding Be-Bop Deluxe's "Ships in the Night" and their EP Hot Valves, "Do You Dream in Colour?" is also his highest performing single in the UK.

In 2022, on tour in support of her album Pompeii, Cate Le Bon performed a cover of "Do You Dream in Colour?" during an encore, joined by Andrew Savage and Austin Brown of Parquet Courts.

== Track listing ==
All tracks are written by Bill Nelson.

Quit Dreaming and Get on the Beam track listing
No.	Title	Length
1.	"Banal"	3:54
2.	"Living in My Limousine"	4:11
3.	"Vertical Games"	3:16
4.	"Disposable"	5:56
5.	"False Alarms"	2:52
6.	"Decline and Fall"	4:44
7.	"Life Runs Out Like Sand"	5:24
8.	"A Kind of Loving"	4:17
9.	"Do You Dream in Colour?"	3:47
10.	"U.H.F."	4:42
11.	"Youth of Nation on Fire"	4:06
12.	"Quit Dreaming and Get on the Beam"	3:40
Total length:		50:49

Various reissues insert an additional track "White Sound" (originally on the B-side of the 12" single "Living in My Limousine") between "Decline and Fall" and "Life Runs Out Like Sand".

Sounding the Ritual Echo (Atmospheres for Dreaming) track listing
No.	Title	Length
1.	"Annunciation"	2:10
2.	"The Ritual Echo"	1:30
3.	"Sleep"	3:22
4.	"Near East"	2:19
5.	"Emak Bakia"	3:29
6.	"My Intricate Image"	3:24
7.	"Endless Orchids"	3:21
8.	"The Heat in the Room"	1:02
9.	"Another Willingly Opened Window"	3:50
10.	"Vanishing Parades"	3:26
11.	"Glass Fish (for the Final Aquariam)"	2:57
12.	"Cubical Domes"	2:37
13.	"Ashes of Roses"	3:06
14.	"The Shadow Garden"	4:11
15.	"Opium"	1:48
Total length:		42:32

== Personnel ==
Credits are adapted from the CD Cocteau release of Quit Dreaming....

- Bill Nelson – all other instruments
- Ian Nelson – saxophone
- Andy Clark – keyboards (track 4)
- Rick Ford – fretless bass (4)
- Steve Peer – drums (4)
- Tom Kellichan – drums (6)

Technical and design

- Bill Nelson – production, photography
- John Leckie – (except 10, 11)
- Ted Sharp – engineering (10)
- Bob Whiteley – engineering (11)
- Rocking Russian – graphics

== Charts ==
=== Album ===
Original release
Chart (1981)	Peak position
UK Albums (OCC)	7

2025 re-release
Chart (2025)	Peak position
Scottish Albums (OCC)	34
UK Independent Albums (OCC)	11

=== Singles ===
"Do You Dream in Colour?"
Chart (1980)	Peak position
UK Singles (OCC)	52

"Youth of Nation on Fire"
Chart (1981)	Peak position
UK Singles (OCC)	73

"Living in My Limousine"
Chart (1981)	Peak position
UK Singles Bubbling Under (OCC)	76–100
