= Sound-on-Sound =

Studio album by Bill Nelson's Red Noise
- Released: 16 February 1979
- Studio: Townhouse Studios, London
- Genre: New wave; electronic; post-punk
- Length: 38:23
- Label: Harvest/EMI
- Producer: John Leckie, Bill Nelson

Bill Nelson chronology
Drastic Plastic (1978)	Sound-on-Sound (1979)	Quit Dreaming and Get on the Beam (1981)

Singles from Sound-on-Sound
- 1. "Furniture Music" Released: February 1979; 2. "Revolt Into Style" Released: May 1979

Sound-on-Sound is the sole album by the English new wave band Bill Nelson's Red Noise, released in February 1979 by record label Harvest. Band leader Bill Nelson formed the group after the disbandment of Be-Bop Deluxe in 1978. The record was recorded with producer and engineer John Leckie, and marks a stylistic change for Nelson with its emphasis on synthesizers. His lyrics were inspired by science fiction and dystopian themes, which the musician tried to present in a humorous way. The album cover, featuring a bed-ridden robot, was photographed by Bishin Jumonji

Promoted by the singles "Furniture Music" and "Revolt Into Style", Sound-on-Sound reached number 33 on the UK Albums Chart and perplexed fans and music critics, with criticism centred on its 'artificial' sound. EMI, Harvest's parent label, dropped Nelson in July 1979, rendering Sound-on-Sound their only album. It has been re-released by Harvest several times, including as a deluxe edition in 2012, and has been reappraised in a positive light by critics.

== Background and recording ==
Since its 1972 inception, Bill Nelson was the leader and guitarist of eclectic rock band Be-Bop Deluxe, with whom he achieved some success, but later found himself restricted as the group's guitarist. With the band's final album, Drastic Plastic (1978), Nelson felt his ideas were marginalised compared to those of his bandmates, describing the record as disrupting the "transitional stage" he envisioned exploring between their previous album Modern Music (1976) and what became Sound-on-Sound. As such, he dissolved Be-Bop Deluxe, feeling that beginning a new band was "the only way to do what I wanted to do." He had wished to dissolve the group before Drastic Plastic was recorded, but was persuaded by the band's management to continue. "Had I gotten my way," Nelson later said, "the Drastic Plastic material would have been recorded as the first Red Noise album. Instead, I adapted it for the final Be Bop album."

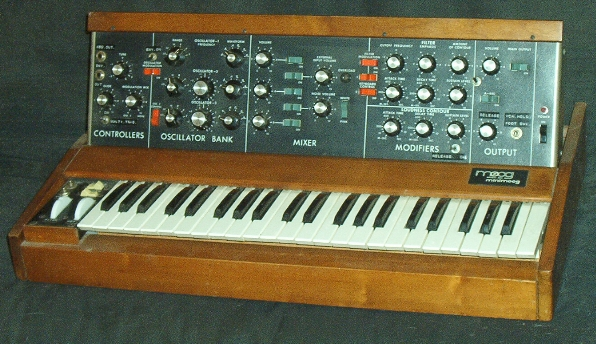
The Minimoog is one of the most-used synths on Sound-on-Sound.

By forming Bill Nelson's Red Noise, the musician again exerted creative control, paying the other members as session musicians. He described the decision to form a band, rather than present himself as a solo musician with "an anonymous backing group", as a way of "hiding" and avoid being trapped "in a specific mould" if he achieved major success, saying: "This way I can change whatever cover I have to work under when my ideas alter or develop." Be-Bop Deluxe keyboardist Andy Clark joined Nelson in Red Noise, with the line-up completed by Bill's brother Ian on saxophone and jazz bassist Rick Ford. Drumming on Sound-on-Sound is split between Nelson and Dave Mattacks. The group recorded the album at Townhouse Studios, London, with producer and engineer John Leckie. Nelson had worked with Leckie since the first Be-Bop Deluxe album and found their partnership had developed into a "very give-and-take" fashion.

Recording the album was a simpler process than any Be-Bop Deluxe record due to the prevalence of synthesizers, which Nelson felt were "much richer, tonally, than you realise," and only used overdubs to emphasise a specific sound, typically guitars. He elaborated: "With a synthesizer you press a switch and a sound is the direct result. With a guitar you pluck a string, which resonates above a pick-up, which then sends a signal along a wire to an amplifier, etc, etc, etc. It's a thinner sound altogether, which is why we can reproduce the album material so much more simply onstage using a lot of electronic instruments." The influence of electronic music on Nelson in the period, including groups like the Residents, led him to begin using a synthesizer guitar instead of an ordinary one, and processing snare drums through fuzzboxes, among other experimentation. The most prominent synths on the album are the Minimoog and Yamaha CS80. Several songs on the album were remixed at Utopia Studios, London. Upon completion, Nelson felt unusually proud of the album, whereas with Be-Bop Deluxe albums he "couldn't bear to hear them for two months afterwards."

== Composition ==
Nelson wrote the songs on Sound-on-Sound about "mundane, domestic things," citing "electronic appliances, factories...the paraphernalia of the times," and commenting that the album's instrumentation and arrangements reflect this. He said the "basic concept" behind the record was to explore all the science fiction themes he "hinted at" with Be-Bop Deluxe, who had one song on each album with such themes. He drew inspiration from dystopian novels like E.M. Forster's The Machine Stops, Ray Bradbury's Fahrenheit 451 and those by George Orwell, as well as the imagery of Fritz Lang's film Metropolis (1927), but also felt the album had a "future-kitsch element", highlighting its "slight tongue-in-cheek quality that suggests humorous absurdity" and describing the album as exploring its sinister concepts playfully. According to critic Michael Waynick, the album's lyrics explore a wide palette of 20th century dystopian fantasies, ranging from "Soviet-style social realism to state-sponsored lobotomy," while writer Daryl Easlea describes the album as modernistic and "full of 1984-style portent."

The music is characterised by its mechanical synthesizers, harsh guitars and frenzied rhythms. By emphasising synthesised instrumentation, and eschewing guitar solos, the record marks a firm departure from Be-Bop Deluxe, with Red Noise moving Nelson into a new wave direction, although a guitar solo does appear on "The Atom Age". Nelson wrote some songs to break from "the idea of a rhythm which starts at point A and goes to point B by a logical progression," instead building songs like "Don't Touch Me (I'm Electric)", "Stop/Go/Stop" and "Radar in My Heart" in a more abnormal fashion until the results were "a little bit angular; you can't just flow through them, yet their urgency creates its own kind of flow." The musician described the musical structure of "Art/Empire/Industry" as a jokey experiment "using a kind of Beatles' 'Twist & Shout' build-up but with modern instrumentation and techniques." He wrote "Stop/Go/Stop" – which features the line "To Central Information, from Intelligence Patrol/We all must follow orders, obey remote control" – in 1977 about his future-wife Jan while he was still married to his first wife. He married Jan by the recording of Sound-on-Sound and reflected on the song: "I'd been trying to tell Jan how I felt about her through my songs. They were born out of this heady love I was feeling for her."

== Release and reception ==
The sleeve of Sound-on-Sound was designed by Japanese artist Bishin Jumonji, and depicts a bed-ridden robot constructed of both electronic and electromechanical components, chosen by Nelson to represent the album's 'mundane, domestic' themes. The back cover features an "Important Notice" writing that the album was "styled with today's hi-fi in mind," saying that the record should be "played at high volume in a room with no views other than those afforded by the use of subliminal image video apparatus." Nelson said he wrote the notice with his "tongue firmly in cheek". During the band's live performances, the group wore Red Army-style matching uniforms and used intricate lighting to "underline the point of the music," according to Nelson, who elaborated: "The songs are about the impending gloom of 1984, the austerity and the indoctrination. But I wanted to present the band as the perpetrators rather than the victims. The uniforms are part of that."

After disbanding Be-Bop Deluxe, Nelson gave EMI—parent company of Harvest Records, to which the band was signed—a choice between signing Red Noise or dropping him altogether. Although the label agreed to sign Red Noise, they were taken aback when hearing Sound-on-Sound. Nelson elaborated: "A friend had dinner with EMI's head of A&R and told me he'd been asked, 'What's wrong with Bill? Why's he doing all this crazy music?'" Harvest released Sound-on-Sound on 16 February 1979, with the lead single "Furniture Music" being issued the same month. While the album jarred Nelson's fan base, it debuted and peaked at number 33 on the UK Albums Chart, where it stayed for five weeks, while "Furniture Music" reached number 59 on the UK Singles Chart, with "Revolt Into Style" reaching number 69 in May. In the United States, where the album was released by Capitol Records, it was a commercial failure.

Sound-on-Sound was released to polarising reviews from music critics, some of whom panned its intricate sound and compared it unfavourably with the work of Talking Heads and T. Rex. John Orme of Melody Maker derided the album for its "transparently contrived" music, which he equated with the bed-ridden robot on the album cover. Nelson was upset at the poor reception, telling interviewer Mark Williams that he felt reviewers chastised the album for sounding "artificial" when this was the intention of the album. He also rejected criticisms of the album being too dense and layered as "it was recorded so much more simply than the Be-bop albums." Following the album's disappointing sales in the US, Nelson was dropped by Capitol. In the UK, EMI dropped Nelson altogether in July 1979, alongside other groups like Wire, as the label was slimming down its roster and looking for more commercially viable artists. By that point, Nelson had been working on a second Red Noise album, which was intended for an August 1979 release, but the dropping left the tapes with EMI. He reworked some of the material for his solo album Quit Dreaming and Get on the Beam (1981); Nelson's prioritisation of solo material effectively ended Bill Nelson's Red Noise.

== Retrospective assessment and legacy ==
Professional ratings
Review scores
Source	Rating
AllMusic	4.5/5 stars
Encyclopedia of Popular Music	2/5 stars
The Great Rock Discography	7/10
Record Collector	5/5 stars

Sound-on-Sound went out-of-print in 1980–81, but was re-released on vinyl by Cocteau Records in 1986, and remastered for CD release by Harvest in 1999. In 2012, Harvest released a deluxe edition of the album featuring live tracks, B-sides and Peel sessions. Reviewing the vinyl reissue, Option said the album's "nervous, jagged King Crimson meets Queen at a new wave club sound (with some metal thrown in) sounds as much like MTV as anything on MTV, and that is intended as a compliment." In a review of the 1999 reissue, Neil Mckay of Sunday Life wrote that the album's "pioneering electro/rock/pop" was "still sounding fresh." Reviewing the 2012 reissue, Daryl Easlea of Record Collector called Sound-on-Sound "the intelligent, one-off a curio that split the crowd on release in 1979, but simply gets better with age." He hailed it for its "weird, futuristic music" which he felt was consistently surprising and speedy, concluding that the album "still sounds how you once imagined the future would be." "Furniture Music" was also credited by Easlea for predicting Tubeway Army's hit single "Are 'Friends' Electric?" by three months, highlighting their "striking commonality".

Michael Waynick of AllMusic praised the album as "a brilliant collection of anti-romantic anthems" that "sounds like Devo given the Phil Spector wall-of-sound treatment." He hailed its breathless pace and tuneful sound and wrote: "If Nelson did abandon Red Noise as a musical dead end, it was a fascinating cul-de-sac nonetheless." His colleague Steven McDonald called the record "a fluid document that demonstrated Nelson's ability to experiment." Mac Randall of Musician described Sound-on-Sound as a "brilliant album that went nowhere." Ira Robbins of Trouser Press wrote that Nelson "attacked the future with gusto" with the album's mix of lyrical modernism and "subtly infiltrated synthetic sounds," but considered the songs to be "the weak link," which he felt were generally half-formed "despite some good ideas." In The Virgin Encyclopedia of Popular Music, Colin Larkin described the record as an "agitated but confused" response to "punk and techno-rock forces." The music magazine Sound on Sound, established in 1985, was named after the album.

== Track listing ==
All songs written by Bill Nelson.

=== Side one ===
1. "Don't Touch Me, (I'm Electric)" – 1:50
2. "For Young Moderns" – 4:24
3. "Stop/Go/Stop" – 3:10
4. "Furniture Music" – 3:31
5. "Radar in My Heart" – 1:36
6. "Stay Young" – 3:11

=== Side two ===
7. "Out of Touch" – 3:31
8. "A Better Home in the Phantom Zone" – 4:26
9. "Substitute Flesh" – 3:29
10. "Atom Age" – 3:01
11. "Art/Empire/Industry" – 2:45
12. "Revolt into Style" – 3:23

=== 2012 bonus tracks ===
13. "Wonder Toys That Last Forever" ("Furniture Music" B-side)
14. "Acquitted by Mirrors" ("Furniture Music" B-side)
15. "Stay Young" (live at Leicester De Montfort Hall, 8 March 1979) ("Revolt Into Style" B-side)
16. "Out of Touch" (live at Leicester De Montfort Hall, 8 March 1979) ("Revolt Into Style" B-side)
17. "Stay Young" (Radio 1 Friday Rock Show session (17 February 1979)
18. "Furniture Music" (Radio 1 Friday Rock Show session (17 February 1979)
19. "Don’t Touch Me (I’m Electric)" (Radio 1 Friday Rock Show session (17 February 1979)
20. "Out of Touch" (Radio 1 Friday Rock Show session (17 February 1979)

== Personnel ==
Adapted from the liner notes of Sound-on-Sound

Bill Nelson's Red Noise

- Bill Nelson – vocals, guitar, drums, synthesizer, keyboards, bass, percussion, harmonica, vocoder
- Rick Ford – bass
- Andy Clark – keyboards, synthesizer
- Dave Mattacks – drums, electronic drums
- Ian Nelson – tenor and alto saxophone, Wurlitzer, string synthesizer

Technical

- Haydn Bendall – engineer
- Bishin Jumonji – front cover photography
