= The Love That Whirls (Diary of a Thinking Heart) =

Studio album by Bill Nelson
- Released: June 1982
- Recorded: April – November 1981
- Studios: Ric-Rac, Leeds; Rockfield, Monmouthshire
- Genre: Synth-pop
- Length: 44:39
- Labels: Mercury (UK); PVC (US); Passport (CA)
- Producer: Bill Nelson

Bill Nelson chronology
Sleepcycle (1982)	The Love That Whirls (Diary of a Thinking Heart) (1982)	King of the Cowboys (1982)

Singles from The Love That Whirls
- 1. "Eros Arriving" Released: 30 April 1982; 2. "Flaming Desire" Released: July 1982

The Love That Whirls (Diary of a Thinking Heart) is the third (Note: If the album Sounding the Ritual Echo (Atmospheres for Dreaming) (1981) is counted, The Love That Whirls is technically Nelson's fourth studio album. However, Sounding the Ritual Echo, an instrumental album originally packaged with limited copies of Quit Dreaming and Get on the Beam (1981), did not have a standalone release until 1985, so The Love That Whirls is, in effect, Nelson's third solo studio album release.) studio album by English musician Bill Nelson. The album was released in June 1982 and was self-produced.

It is the second in a trilogy of albums with Mercury Records, including Quit Dreaming and Get on the Beam (1981) and Chimera (1983). It reached no. 28 in the UK albums chart.

== Background and recording ==
The recording sessions that produced The Love That Whirls occurred between April and November 1981. During this period, his previous album Quit Dreaming and Get on the Beam was released, and Nelson also released Das Kabinett (The Cabinet of Doctor Caligari), the soundtrack to the Yorkshire Actors Company's stage adaptation of the 1920 Robert Wiene's silent film of the same name.

== Style, title, and cover art ==
The album marked a further shift in style in Bill Nelson's work up to that point; the gradual evolution from the primarily guitar-based rock of Be-Bop Deluxe to the new wave-tinged Quit Dreaming... showed an increasing emphasis of synthesizers. Despite this, guitars still appear frequently on the album, primarily in the form of the E-bow guitar. In a 1989 interview for the magazine Musician, Nelson addressed misconceptions that he had largely abandoned the instrument:

For a while I really did look upon the guitar as being an overstatement of the very obvious things, ... And it suddenly seemed like guitar playing had developed into a language, which was very set and stylized. ... In fact, on The Love That Whirls, there's more guitar playing than on some of the albums I'd done earlier. But nobody recognized it because I was using the E-Bow and they thought it was a synth, you see. ... I suddenly realized that people don’t recognize this as guitar because the common language of guitar has become so nailed to the floor.

Scattered across the album are ambient instrumentals that act as transitional pieces between the longer, more synth-pop-oriented tracks of the record. Melodically, The Love that Whirls took inspiration from Japanese music, largely apparent on songs such as "Eros Arriving".

The title is taken from an unreleased film by Kenneth Anger, and the front cover depicts Nelson posing next to a 10th-century CE figurine of the Hindu deity Nataraja, lord of the dance. (Note: In a CD reissue of The Love That Whirls..., Mark Powell credits the Victoria and Albert Museum for dating the Nataraja statuette.)

== Promotion and release ==
The Love That Whirls peaked at no. 28 on the UK albums chart. Two singles, "Eros Arriving" and "Flaming Desire", were taken from the album, the former of which peaked on the UK Bubbling Under chart, while the latter was accompanied by a music video that entered light rotation on MTV later in early 1984.

=== La Belle et la Bête (Beauty and the Beast) ===
To promote The Love That Whirls, a limited run of copies included an additional album entitled La Belle et la Bête, a second soundtrack with the Yorkshire Actors Company that adapted Jean Cocteau's film Beauty and the Beast for the stage. This double album release, advertised in magazines such as Smash Hits, is similar to when ten thousand copies of Quit Dreaming and Get on the Beam were paired with the instrumental album Sounding the Ritual Echo (Atmospheres for Dreaming). Although La Belle et la Bête was not released as a standalone record, Nelson would later re-release the soundtrack with Das Kabinett as a double album compilation in 1985.

=== Flaming Desires and Other Passions ===
In December 1982, an extended play combining tracks from both singles was released in the US, entitled Flaming Desires and Other Passions. The 12" EP on PVC Records was self-produced and featured contributions from his brother Ian Nelson on saxophone (who also played on Quit Dreaming...) and from Bogdan Wiczling and Mark Radcliffe on drums.

== Critical reception ==
Professional ratings
Review scores
Source	Rating
AllMusic	4.5/5 stars
The Encyclopedia of Popular Music	3/5 stars
The Great Rock Discography	6/10
Record Mirror	4/5 stars
Smash Hits	7/10

In a contemporary review, Tim de Lisle of Smash Hits praised The Love That Whirls as "varied, danceable, and highly original", concluding it is "Far from faultless but worth a listen." Ira Robbins, writing for the Trouser Press, said Nelson's instrumentals stay "out of the way of the vocals but remains clever and unusual. ... To Nelson the synthesizer is an instrument of subtle shadings, and he has created a gossamer world of musical beauty". Reviewing for Record Mirror, Daniela Soave lauded it as "one of this year's prime LPs", additionally offering praise towards its companion album La Belle et la Bête, saying that it "exemplifies Nelson's talent to change moods and thrust visual images into your head."

In a retrospective assessment for AllMusic, Steven McDonald said "There is a sweetness and a lightness to a great deal of the work Nelson put into this album, and this makes it infinitely listenable. In some respects, this is also a record that will teach listeners everything they need to know about Bill Nelson – it touches on all aspects of what he does."

== Legacy ==
In 2020, Jack Tatum, largely known as the creative force behind the band Wild Nothing, wrote a guest review for the website Off Your Radar in which he said:

For me, it’s not only one of the most tragically overlooked examples of early ’80s synthesized pop and experimental music, but one of my favorite records. ... The Love That Whirls has become my go-to recommended album ever since I discovered it a number of years ago, a vibrant example of almost all the things I love about music from this era.

== Track listing ==
All tracks are written by Bill Nelson.

The Love That Whirls (Diary of a Thinking Heart) track listing
No.	Title	Length
1.	"Empire of the Senses"	4:49
2.	"Hope for the Heartbeat"	3:53
3.	"Waiting of Voices"	1:37
4.	"A Private View"	5:38
5.	"Eros Arriving"	3:34
6.	"The Bride of Christ in Autumn"	2:24
7.	"When Your Dream of Perfect Beauty Comes True"	3:36
8.	"Flaming Desire"	4:53
9.	"Portrait of Jan with Flowers"	2:12
10.	"The Crystal Excalator in the Palace of God Department Store"	3:20
11.	"Echo in Her Eyes (The Lamps of Oblivion)"	2:01
12.	"The October Man"	6:42
Total length:		44:39

Various reissues insert "Flesh" and "He and Sleep Were Brothers" (originally included on the "Eros Arriving" double 7" single) between "The Bride of Christ in Autumn" and "When Your Dream of Perfect Beauty Comes True".

La Belle et la Bête (Beauty and the Beast) track listing
No.	Title	Length
1.	"Overture"	2:45
2.	"The Family"	1:51
3.	"Sisters and Sedan Chairs"	1:46
4.	"In the Forest of Storms"	3:26
5.	"The Castle"	1:02
6.	"The Gates"	0:27
7.	"The Corridor"	0:11
8.	"The Great Hall"	1:33
9.	"Dreams (The Merchant Sleeps)"	0:37
10.	"Fear (The Merchant Wakes)"	1:30
11.	"The Rose and the Beast"	0:23
12.	"Magnificent (The White House)"	1:13
13.	"Beauty Enters the Castle"	0:34
14.	"The Door"	0:20
15.	"The Mirror"	0:20
16.	"Candelabra and Gargoyles"	0:30
17.	"Beauty and the Beast"	2:04
18.	"Transition No. 1"	0:50
19.	"Transition No. 2"	0:21
20.	"The Hunt"	1:28
21.	"The Gift"	0:10
22.	"The Garden"	2:18
23.	"Transition No. 3"	1:01
24.	"Transition No. 4"	0:45
25.	"The Tragedy"	0:59
26.	"Transition No. 5"	0:27
27.	"The Enchanted Glove"	1:20
28.	"Tears as Diamonds (The Gift Reverses)"	0:11
29.	"The Beast in Solitude"	1:11
30.	"The Return of Magnificent"	0:25
31.	"Transition No. 6 (The Journey)"	1:26
32.	"The Pavilion of Diana"	0:35
33.	"Transformation No. 1"	1:21
34.	"Transformation No. 2"	1:14
35.	"The Final Curtain"	2:01
Total length:		38:35

== Personnel ==
Credits are primarily adapted from the CD release of The Love That Whirls on Mercury.

- Bill Nelson – all other instruments, including vocals, E-bow guitar, Roland TR-808 drum machine, autoharp, flute, keyboards, marimbas
- Jan Nelson – vibraslap on "Empire of the Senses"
- Bogdan Wiczling – drums on "The October Man"
- Mark Radcliffe – percussion on "He and Sleep Were Brothers" (uncredited) (Note: On the 2005 CD reissue of The Love That Whirls, although Mark Radcliffe was excluded from the list of contributors, the liner notes separately mentions his role elsewhere.)

Technical and design

- Bill Nelson – production, engineering, mastering, cover concept
- Ted Sharp, Pat Moran, John Leckie, Mick Robson – engineering
- Ray Staff – mastering
- David Claridge – cover concept
- Sheila Rock – cover photography

== Charts ==
=== Album ===
Chart (1982)	Peak position
UK Albums (OCC)	28

=== Singles ===
"Eros Arriving"
Chart (1982)	Peak position
UK Singles Bubbling Under (OCC)	76–100
