= Getting the Holy Ghost Across =

- Original UK release

Studio album by Bill Nelson
- Released: 7 April 1986 (UK); August 1986 (US)
- Studio: The Echo Observatory, Yorkshire; Surrey Sound, Surrey; Round House, London; Rockfield, Monmouthshire; Marcus Recording, London
- Genre: Synth-pop
- Length: 45:35 (UK LP); 1:09:21 (UK cassette); 46:40 (US)
- Label: Portrait
- Producer: Bill Nelson

Bill Nelson chronology
Das Kabinett / La Belle et la Bête (1985)	Getting the Holy Ghost Across (1986)	Chamber of Dreams (Music from the Invisibility Exhibition) (1986)

On a Blue Wing
- US release

Singles from Getting the Holy Ghost Across
- 1. "Wildest Dreams" Released: March 1986

Getting the Holy Ghost Across is the eighth (Note: If all albums within the 1985 set Trial by Intimacy (The Book of Splendours) are counted, Getting the Holy Ghost Across is technically Nelson's eleventh's studio album. However, each album in the set did not have a standalone release until after Getting the Holy Ghost Across, so it is, in effect, Nelson's eighth studio album release.) studio album by English musician Bill Nelson. The album was self-produced and released on 7 April 1986. The album marked a return to a major label, this time Portrait Records. It reached no. 91 in the UK albums chart. The album was released in the US as On a Blue Wing in August 1986.

== Release ==
The record label for the album, Portrait Records, believed that the Christian themes of the title and cover art would upset American audiences enough to affect sales. Ultimately in the US, the album was renamed to On a Blue Wing, the cover was changed, and the track listing was resequenced. In a 1989 interview with the magazine Musician, Nelson's reflected upon his disappointment with the label's decision, saying "It was, in a sense, an immoral judgment because they are saying, 'We'd rather have money than present your true ideas to people. And you know if it means we can make less money from the record by putting it out in its true state, then we are going to have to change it'".

Getting the Holy Ghost Across peaked at no. 91 on the UK albums chart. The album's only single "Wildest Dreams" did not chart.

== Critical reception ==
Professional ratings
Review scores
Source	Rating
AllMusic	3/5 stars
The Encyclopedia of Popular Music	3/5 stars
The Great Rock Discography	6/10
Record Mirror	3.5/5 stars

In a contemporary review in Music Week, Getting the Holy Ghost Across was described as "Fastidiously presented and shot through with graceful melodies," drawing comparions to David Bowie "minus the obvious marketing angle." In contrast, Nancy "Cosmic" Culp of Record Mirror believed that the album fell into clichés representative of Nelson's prior work; nonetheless the reviewer found it "a hugely listenable album."

Robert Carlberg of Electronic Musician wrote On a Blue Wing "finds [Nelson] optimistic, extroverted and sharing instrumental duties with an unprecedented six accomplices." In the Canadian magazine RPM, it was described as "one of the more well thought out releases of this year ... Certainly creative, and pleasurable." The Gavin Report dubbed the album "a masterwork", adding "The oriental overtones and cerebral melodies point to a place that radio ironically fears to tread. ... It is grounded in reality, only it's a beautiful reality.

In a retrospective review of On a Blue Wing for AllMusic, Dan LeRoy said that although "a few of the songs succumb to the synthetic stasis that sometimes marked Nelson's instrumental work – this collection still contains several examples of the auteur at his best," singling out tracks such as "Heart and Soul" as being infused "with an exotic and spiritual romanticism that owes more to dead poets than pop stars."

== Track listing ==
All tracks are written by Bill Nelson.

Getting the Holy Ghost Across track listing – LP
No.	Title	Length
1.	"Suvasini"	1:46
2.	"Contemplation"	8:51
3.	"Theology"	4:36
4.	"Wildest Dreams"	4:34
5.	"Lost in Your Mystery"	4:53
6.	"Rise Like a Fountain"	4:56
7.	"Age of Reason"	4:03
8.	"The Hidden Flame"	4:24
9.	"Because of You"	6:36
10.	"Pansophia"	0:56
Total length:		45:35

The cassette version extends "Because of You" and adds five tracks, inserted variously after "Age of Reason".

Getting the Holy Ghost Across track listing – cassette
No.	Title	Length
8.	"Living for the Spangled Moment"	4:55
9.	"The Hidden Flame"	4:24
10.	"Word for Word"	5:11
11.	"Illusions of You"	3:40
12.	"Heart and Soul"	4:49
13.	"Finks and Stooges of the Spirit"	4:24
14.	"Because of You"	7:23
15.	"Pansophia"	0:56
Total length:		1:09:21

On a Blue Wing replaced "Theology" and "Age of Reason" with "Heart and Soul" and "Living for the Spangled Moment" and reordered the album.

On a Blue Wing track listing
No.	Title	Length
1.	"Suvasini"	1:46
2.	"Contemplation"	8:51
3.	"Wildest Dreams"	4:34
4.	"Lost in Your Mystery"	4:53
5.	"The Hidden Flame"	4:24
6.	"Rise Like a Fountain"	4:56
7.	"Heart and Soul"	4:49
8.	"Living for the Spangled Moment"	4:55
9.	"Because of You"	6:36
10.	"Pansophia"	0:56
Total length:		46:40

== Personnel ==
Credits are adapted from the 1986 cassette notes of Getting the Holy Ghost Across, and track numbers correspond to the cassette track listing.

- Bill Nelson – vocals, electric guitar, acoustic guitar, keyboards, marimbas, drums, percussion; bass (tracks 5, 7)
- Iain Denby – bass (except 1, 5, 7, 15)
- Andy Davis – additional keyboards (except 1, 15)
- Ian Nelson – saxophone (except 1, 15)
- Preston Heyman – percussion (except 1, 15)
- Dick Morrissey – saxophone (7, 14)
- Peter Geeves – violin (4)
- William Gregory – soprano saxophone (7)

Technical

- Bill Nelson – production, engineering
- Léon Phillips, John Leckie – engineering
- Steve Nye – engineering (except 1, 7, 15)

== Charts ==
Chart (1986)	Peak position
UK Albums (OCC)	91
