= Ian Parkin =

English musician (1949–1995)

Ian Richard Parkin (18 August 1949 – 1 July 1995) was an English musician who played rhythm guitar with the first incarnation of Bill Nelson's Be-Bop Deluxe.

Parkin was born in Wakefield, Yorkshire, where he befriended Nelson when both were attending Ings Road Secondary Modern School. They made their musical live debut at a school Christmas concert, as a guitar duo. Later, they formed The Cosmonauts, which later became The Strangers.

Later, he and Nelson founded Flagship, later to become Be Bop Deluxe. However, Parkin played only on the first album of the band, Axe Victim, released in 1974, quitting shortly afterwards. He continued with the music business, married and had three children.

He died on 1 July 1995, aged 45.
