= Fiat Lux (band) =

English synth-pop band

- Origin: Wakefield, West Yorkshire, England
- Genres: Synth-pop, new wave
- Years active: 1982–1985, 2017–present
- Labels: Cocteau, Polydor, Splid
- Members: Steve Wright; David P Crickmore
- Past members: Ian Nelson
- Website: http://www.fiatluxmusic.co.uk

Fiat Lux are an English synth-pop band formed in Wakefield, Yorkshire, England, in 1982, by Steve Wright (vocals, percussion) and David P Crickmore (guitars, bass, keyboards). Ian Nelson (sax, keyboards), younger brother of Be-Bop Deluxe guitarist and lead vocalist Bill Nelson, joined shortly afterwards, complementing the classic line-up of the band. In 2017 Wright and Crickmore began working together again as Fiat Lux after a long hiatus.

== History ==
Wright and Crickmore attended Bretton Hall College, Wakefield, where they studied drama, meeting after the first joined the latter's new wave band, Juveniles (whose two songs were released in a various artists compilation called Household Shocks). Wright later joined theatre company Yorkshire Actors, where he met musician Bill Nelson. After impressing him with a demo tape, Nelson produced one of the demo's tracks, "Feels Like Winter Again", b/w "This Illness" and released it on his Cocteau Records label in November 1982, by which time Nelson's brother Ian had joined the group. "Feels Like Winter Again" gained the band radio airplay and led to them signing a record deal with major label, Polydor, and subsequent support slots with Howard Jones. The group began to move away from their original punk rock sound, drawing inspiration from synth-driven acts like The Normal, Tubeway Army, Japan, Ultravox, and early OMD.

Fiat Lux had minor UK chart hits with "Secrets" and "Blue Emotion", which were followed by the mini album, Hired History, in August 1984. They made several TV appearances, including a performance on Old Grey Whistle Test. There was also a long format video release Commercial Breakdown, which included live versions of the shelved tracks for their debut Polydor album.

Crickmore departed after the chart failure of their fifth Polydor single release, "House Of Thorns". The band continued recording some songs with session musicians, including Rick Martinez (Richard Anthony Martinez) who had already played drums on some of their earlier works. They disbanded in 1985.

Wright joined former members of Camera Obscura, to form Hoi Poloi, another short-lived pop group. He then abandoned the music industry to become a television director. Crickmore dedicated to more experimental projects through the remaining 1980s, culminating in an album on the London-based independent record label, Yellow Moon Records, Lettuce Spay under the name This. In the 1990s he rediscovered his love of folk and roots music and became a founder member of The Durbervilles. From 2005 The Durbevilles became radio presenters with a weekly folk and roots show on BBC Radio Leeds. Ian Nelson continued to work with his brother Bill in the early 1990s; he died in his sleep on 23 April 2006.

In 2017, Wright and Crickmore reformed Fiat Lux and released a remake of their song "Secrets". A full album of new material "Saved Symmetry" was released in March 2019, swiftly followed by a double CD retrospective collection of "Polydor years" material entitled Hired History Plus in April 2019. Disc two of this collection contained the previously shelved 'Ark Of Embers' album, originally intended for release in 1985. Ark Of Embers as a vinyl LP was finally released as a stand alone item by Splid Records later that same year.

2019 also saw Fiat Lux return to live performance (Steve and David augmented by saxophonist Will Howard), with a relaunch gig in a William Morris decorated Victorian church in Bradford, followed by UK festival appearances.

Live appearances continue from then on with Will Howard becoming a regular feature on sax. By the release of November 2021's Twisted Culture album on Splid Records his photograph has due prominence on the inner sleeve along with Steve and David

== Discography ==
=== Singles ===
- "Feels Like Winter Again" (November 1982), Cocteau - UK No. 152
- "Photography" (August 1983), Polydor
- "Secrets" (January 1984), Polydor - UK No. 65
- "Blue Emotion" (March 1984), Polydor - UK No. 59
- "House of Thorns" (September 1984), Polydor
- "Solitary Lovers" (January 1985), Polydor
- "Secrets 2017" (February 2017), Splid
- "It's You" (May 2018) Splid
- "Everyday In Heaven" (February 2019), Splid via Proper
- "(How Will We Ever) Work This Way" (June 2020), Splid via Proper

=== Albums ===
- Hired History (August 1984), Polydor – mini-LP
- Saved Symmetry (March 2019), Splid
- Hired History Plus (April 2019), Cherry Red - on CD/ Universal Music - digitally
- Ark Of Embers (November 2019), Splid
- Twisted Culture (November 2021), Splid

=== Videography ===
- Commercial Breakdown (1990), Hendring Video
- Live at Bradford St Clements The Comeback Gig 19/10/19 (2021), Splid DVD
