= Tiny Dancers =

English band

- Origin: Sheffield, South Yorkshire, England
- Genres: Indie rock
- Years active: 2005–2009
- Labels: Parlophone
- Past members: David Kay; Chris "Ev" Etherington; Dez Wathey; Duncan "Zed" Morrison; David Glover

Tiny Dancers were an English band formed in Sheffield by vocalist (and acoustic guitarist) David Kay, guitarist Chris "Ev" Etherington, bassist Dez Wathey, drummer Duncan "Zed" Morrison, and keyboardist (also percussionist and guitarist) David Glover. They formed in 2005 and were later signed to Parlophone.

In 2006, they supported various artists such as Bob Dylan and Babyshambles, and released an EP called "Lions and Tigers and Lions". In March 2007, they released their first single "I Will Wait For You". Later that year, they released their sole album Free School Milk and played at several festivals including Glastonbury.

== History ==
=== 2005 ===
In February 2005, the band began rehearsing together. Its members had previously played in other bands across the South Elmsall, South Kirkby and Brierley area.

=== 2006 ===
In 2006, the group toured with Richard Ashcroft and opened for Bob Dylan. They played at Brighton's The Great Escape festival in May of that year.

On 10 January, they supported Babyshambles at The Plug in Sheffield. On 20 November, they released an EP entitled "Lions and Tigers and Lions".

=== 2007 ===
On 12 February 2007, they supported Larrikin Love at Shockwaves NME Awards Show in London, performing the final song together. On 19 March, they released their first single "I Will Wait For You". It reached #36 in the UK Singles Chart.

On 20 April, they played at Camden Crawl festival. In June, they toured with Slow Club.

On 11 June, they released their sole album Free School Milk. It was produced by John Leckie, and peaked at #64 in the UK Albums Chart.

On 24 June, they played the John Peel Stage at Glastonbury Festival. On 12 August, they played the Indoor Stage at Leicester's Summer Sundae festival. In September, they performed at the Loopallu Festival in Ullapool, Scotland.

== Discography ==
=== Albums ===
- Free School Milk Released 11 June 2007, Ltd 12" and CD, Parlophone

=== Singles and EPs ===
- "Bonfire of the Night" / "Deep Water" Released 31 July 2006, 7" (500 only), Russian Doll Records
- "Hannah We Know" / "I've Got to Go" Released 18 September 2006, 7" (500 only), Russian Doll Records
- "Lions and Tigers and Lions" EP Released 20 November 2006, 12" (with 7") and CD, Parlophone
- "I Will Wait For You" Released 19 March 2007 (#36 UK), 2x 7" and CD, Parlophone
- "Hannah We Know" Released 28 May 2007 (#33 UK), 2x 7" and CD, Parlophone
- "Ashes and Diamonds" Released 11 September 2007, Parlophone
