= Simon Fox =

English rock drummer (1949-2024)

- Also known as: Simon Foxx
- Born: 12 July 1949
- Died: 12 September 2024 (aged 75)
- Genres: Glam rock, progressive rock, new wave, synthpop
- Occupation: Musician
- Instruments: Drums and percussion

Simon Andrew David Fox (12 July 1949 – 12 September 2024) was an English rock drummer, who played in different rock bands during the 1970s and the 1980s, most notably the progressive rock group Be-Bop Deluxe.

His earliest band was Hackensack, during the 1970s. He was a session player before joining Be-Bop Deluxe, in 1974, with whom he played on four studio albums, Futurama (1975), Sunburst Finish (1976), Modern Music (1976) and Drastic Plastic (1978), and one live album, Live! in the Air Age (1977). The band split up in 1978, shortly after the release of Drastic Plastic.

After Be-Bop Deluxe, he played in Trevor Rabin's band, touring with them in Britain. Later, he joined Blazer Blazer, along with bassist Steve Barnacle (later in Visage), with whom he toured extensively in 1979 and 1980. They released just one single, "Cecil B. Devine", in 1979. Later, he played on Jack Green's Reverse Logic, released in 1981. Later, he played with Pretty Things, and, in 1983, in Electric Sun.

In 1988, he joined Orkestra (a post-Electric Light Orchestra band formed by bassist Kelly Groucutt and violinist Mik Kaminski), releasing with them two albums, Beyond the Dream and Roll Over Beethoven.

Fox returned to the music industry in 2014, joining Birmingham-based funk rock group the Parade.

Fox died on 12 September 2024.
