= Axe Victim =

Studio album by Be-Bop Deluxe
- Released: June 1974
- Studio: Air London; CBS Studios, London; Audio International Studios, London
- Genre: Glam rock
- Length: 43:20
- Label: Harvest
- Producer: Ian McLintock

Be-Bop Deluxe chronology
Axe Victim (1974)	Futurama (1975)

Singles from Axe Victim
- 1. "Jet Silver and the Dolls of Venus/Third Floor Heaven" Released: June 1974

Professional ratings
Review scores
Source	Rating
Q	2/5 stars
The Rolling Stone Record Guide	2/5 stars

Axe Victim is the debut studio album by the English rock band Be-Bop Deluxe, released in June 1974 by Harvest Records.

== Musical style ==
The music of Axe Victim incorporated elements of progressive rock, blues and folk rock. Overall, the album's sound has been classified as glam rock and art rock.

The material is different from later releases; it was released at the height of the glam rock era in Britain, with the band's music and image being influenced by the musical zeitgeist. Several songs, such as the title track "Axe Victim", demonstrated this glam influence, whilst others, for example, the future concert staple "Adventures in a Yorkshire Landscape", showed their progressive tendencies. At the time of its release, the band's glam image and music was being criticised as being too similar to that of David Bowie, a comparison that would ultimately lead to Be-Bop Deluxe's disbanding as band leader Bill Nelson strived to make more and more unconventional music.

The song "Jets at Dawn", a re-recording of the earlier Smile Records version, holds the distinction of being the longest Be-Bop Deluxe album track, lasting 7:20. The only longer studio recordings are the Sunburst Finish-era B-side "Shine" (at 7:49) and the multi-track "Modern Music" suite.

The album was first released on CD in 1990 with three live bonus tracks. Q Magazine called the album 'painfully contrived [where] only "Adventures in a Yorkshire Landscape" emits that incongruous whiff or originality.

== Production ==
Axe Victim was recorded in AIR London, Audio International Studios and CBS Studios, all located in London, England.

This incarnation of the band, featuring Bill Nelson on vocals and lead guitar, Ian Parkin on rhythm guitar, Robert Bryan on bass, and Nicholas Chatterton-Dew on drums, would only last for this album, before Nelson disbanded Be-Bop Deluxe following the Axe Victim tour and reformed it with several other musicians for the following year's Futurama.

== Track listing ==
All songs written by Bill Nelson, except "Rocket Cathedrals" by Robert Bryan.

Side 1

1. "Axe Victim" – 5:14
2. "Love is Swift Arrows" – 4:12
3. "Jet Silver and the Dolls of Venus" – 4:10
4. "Third Floor Heaven" – 2:27
5. "Night Creatures" – 3:34

Side 2

6. "Rocket Cathedrals" – 3:00
7. "Adventures in a Yorkshire Landscape" – 3:23
8. "Jets at Dawn" – 7:19
9. "No Trains To Heaven" – 6:39
10. "Darkness (L'Immoraliste)" – 3:22

CD issue bonus tracks (1991)

11. "Piece of Mine" (Live, 1977) (CD issue bonus track) – 5:13
12. "Mill Street Junction" (Live, 1977) (CD issue bonus track) – 4:43
13. "Adventures in a Yorkshire Landscape" (Live, 1977) (CD issue bonus track) – 7:56

== Personnel ==
Be-Bop Deluxe

- Bill Nelson – electric and 12-string guitars, lead vocals (all but 6), keyboards
- Ian Parkin – rhythm and acoustic guitars, organ
- Robert Bryan – bass guitar, lead vocals (6)
- Nicholas Chatterton-Dew – drums, percussion, backing vocals

with:

- Andrew Powell – arrangement on "Darkness (L'Immoraliste)"

Technical

- John Leckie, Bill Nelson – producer on bonus tracks
- Pete Silver, Rodney "Beaut" Harper, Steve Nye, Mike Ross-Trevor – engineer
- John Leckie, Mike Ross-Trevor – mixing
- Mick Rock – art direction, photography
- John Holmes – cover

== Charts ==
Chart (2020)	Peak position
Scottish Albums (OCC)	37
UK Independent Albums (OCC)	10
UK Progressive Albums (OCC)	5
