= My Computer (band) =

British indie pop band

- Origin: Manchester, U.K.
- Genres: Indie, pop
- Years active: 1987–2022
- Labels: Creation, 13 Amp, Gut www.recreationrecords.com
- Members: Andrew Chester
- Past members: David Luke, Black Jackson, Adam Booth

My Computer are a British indie pop band from Manchester, United Kingdom. Formed by Andrew Chester and David Luke, their music has been described as "a bold, fearless approach to pop music", "bleak at times", and "a perfect snapshot of modern British life". Their second album, No CV (2005, Gut), was produced by John Leckie.

The songwriter from My Computer Andrew Chester was the singer and songwriter from the bands Hulio Ridiculo, Kid Dynamo and Good Neighbour. He was also responsible for convincing his band Kid Dynamo, to form One Lady Owner, with a songwriter from Liverpool called Steve Dougherty. Together with his manager Derek Ryder, Andrew then devised a plot to get One Lady Owner signed by Alan McGee to Creation Records.

Andrew's full discography for bands he formed, wrote songs for and sang in are as follows.

== Hulio Ridiculo ==
- HR Live Vol 1 (2020 Recreation Records)
- HR Live Vol 2 (2020 Recreation Records)
- HR Live Vol 3 (2020 Recreation Records)
- HR Live Vol 4 (2020 Recreation Records)

== Kid Dynamo ==
- The Boy I Used To Be (2020 Recreation Records)

== Good Neighbour ==
- There Was A Time (2020 Recreation Records)

== One Lady Owner ==
- There's Only We (1997 Creation Records)

== My Computer ==
- Vulnerabilia (2002, 13 Amp)
- No CV (2005, Gut Records)
- No Computer (2008 Recreation Records)
- Death of a Duo (2011 Recreation Records)
- eViL sPaNiSh (2011 Recreation Records)
- Sirens (2012 Recreation Records)
- Regular Money (2014 Recreation Records)
- Brave + New = World (2019 Recreation Records)
- Terrible Times (2021 Recreation Records)
- Crushing Lonelines (2021 Recreation Records)
- Holy War (2021 Recreation Records)
- They Stole The World (2021 Recreation Records)
- YHWH (2022 Recreation Records)
- Stand Up & Be Counted (2022 Recreation Records)
- The 10 Commandments In The Wasteland (2022 Recreation Records)
- Delete The Elite (2022 Recreation Records)
- We Are The Billions (2023 Recreation Records)
