= Free School Milk =

Studio album by Tiny Dancers
- Released: 11 June 2007
- Recorded: 2006/2007
- Length: 48:15
- Label: Parlophone Records
- Producer: John Leckie, Tiny Dancers

Professional ratings
Review scores
Source	Rating
The Guardian	3/5 stars
musicOMH	4/5 stars

Free School Milk is the first album by the English band Tiny Dancers. It was released on 11 June 2007 in the UK.

== Critical reception ==
PopMatters wrote that "with a proper mixture of bouncy pop songs and acoustically dramatic folk, Tiny Dancers' debut is wholesomely enjoyable due to its strikingly eclectic characteristics." NME called the album "a lovely aural pipe-and-slippers, full of delightful harmonies, jaunty jollity and dewy-eyed sadness in equal measure." The Line of Best Fit called it "an aural delight of wide eyed power pop, country tinged hoedowns and tender balladry."

== Track listing ==
1. "20 To 9" (4:32)
2. "I Will Wait For You" (3:11)
3. "Baby Love" (3:01)
4. "Shame" (2:43)
5. "Ashes And Diamonds" (4:20)
6. "Bonfire of The Night" (2:54)
7. "Moon Song #2" (5:48)
8. "Hannah We Know" (3:35)
9. "Hemsworth Hallway" (3:47)
10. "Sun Goes Down" (4:56)
11. "I've Got to Go" (3:23)
12. "Deep Water" (5:39)

== Singles ==
- "I Will Wait For You" (March 2007) UK #36
- "Hannah We Know" (May 2007) UK #33
