= After the Satellite Sings =

Studio album by Bill Nelson
- Released: 30 April 1996
- Recorded: Winter 1995
- Studio: Fairview (East Yorkshire, England)
- Genre: Drum and bass
- Length: 62:03
- Label: Gyroscope; Resurgence
- Producer: Bill Nelson

Bill Nelson chronology
My Secret Studio, Vol. 1 (1995)	After the Satellite Sings (1996)	Confessions of a Hyperdreamer (1997)

After the Satellite Sings is a studio album by the English musician Bill Nelson. It was released on 30 April 1996 through Gyroscope and Resurgence Records and has been largely described as drum and bass album.

== Background and composition ==
Following a number of instrumental albums, After the Satellite Sings was a return to a song-oriented music. It was recorded at Fairview Studios in East Yorkshire in twenty-eight days during the winter of 1995.

Upon release, it was described as an album that incorporates techno music, but later assessments more often categorised it as a drum and bass record. Throughout, Nelson utilises 1950s audio samples including narration by Jack Kerouac, to whom After the Satellite Sings was dedicated. Nelson's own vocals are also present, albeit relatively low in the mix compared to the instrumentation, which is performed almost entirely by himself. One stylistic exception in the album is the penultimate track "V-Ghost (For Harold and Ellen)", a piano-led ambient piece.

== Release ==
After the Satellite Sings was originally released on Gyroscope and Resurgence on 30 April 1996. It was later remastered and reissued on the UK label Esoteric, who were also responsible for other re-releases from Nelson's solo discography.

== Critical reception and legacy ==
Professional ratings
Review scores
Source	Rating
All About Jazz	4.5/5 stars
AllMusic	3/5 stars
Audio	A (sound); B (performance)
Classic Rock	4/5 stars
The Encyclopedia of Popular Music	3/5 stars
The Great Rock Discography	7/10

A contemporary assessement in the magazine Audio gave After the Satellite Sings an "A" for the sound and a "B" for the performance, with the reviewer, Bill Milkowski, calling it a "crafty, intelligent" work that "falls somewhere between Brian Eno's and Prince's self-contained opuses." AllMusic's Steven McDonald, in a review of the opener "Deeply Dazzled", called it "engaging" overall but "perhaps a little too crowded at times." Upon its re-release, Glenn Astarita of All About Jazz praised what they called Nelson's "exhaustive imaginative powers" in creating a varied record "speckled with sporadic doses of fun and frolic."

In the album's reissue sleeve notes, Nelson claimed that Reeves Gabrels, with whom he collaborated on Fantastic Guitars (2014), told him that After the Satellite Sings was influential on David Bowie's album Earthling, released one year later. Chris Roberts, in a four-star review of the remaster for Classic Rock, compared it favourably to Earthling and said that while the "thin" production of the vocals "let it down", it is "probably one of his finest releases". In Prog, Paul Lester thought that, accounting for the artistic risk of foraying into an already establish genre, "this potential clanger was actually a beguiling triumph" wherein Nelson "pulled off the same trick" as Bowie's Earthling.

== Track listing ==
All tracks are written by Bill Nelson.

After the Satellite Sings track listing
No.	Title	Length
1.	"Deeply Dazzled"	5:54
2.	"Dreamster 2.L.R"	4:15
3.	"Flipside"	5:07
4.	"Streamliner"	4:33
5.	"Memory Babe"	3:49
6.	"Skull Baby Cluster"	2:23
7.	"Zoom Sequence"	4:03
8.	"Rocket to Damascus"	4:38
9.	"Beautful Nudes"	3:01
10.	"Old Goat"	5:09
11.	"Squirm"	2:33
12.	"Wow! It's Scootercar Sexkitten!"	1:40
13.	"Phantom Sedan (Theme from Tail-Fin City)"	2:47
14.	"Ordinary Idiots"	3:36
15.	"V-Ghost (For Harold and Ellen)"	3:28
16.	"Blink-Agog"	5:07
Total length:		62:03

== Personnel ==
Credits are adapted from the CD liner notes.

=== Musicians ===
- Bill Nelson – vocals, acoustic and electric guitars, E-bow, bass, keyboards, piano, marimba, harmonica, percussion, drum programming, plastic tape recorder, wind-up gramophone
- Ian Leese – bass on "Rocket to Damascus"
- Dave Cook – Octapad fills on "Old Goat"

=== Technical and design ===
- Bill Nelson – production, mastering at Chop 'Em Out (London), sleeve concept
- John W. Spence – engineering
- Donal Whelan – mastering at Chop 'Em Out
- Mixed Images Ltd. – artwork
