= Drastic Plastic =

Studio album by Be-Bop Deluxe
- Released: February 1978
- Recorded: Summer 1977
- Genre: Art rock; new wave
- Length: 42:14
- Label: Harvest
- Producer: John Leckie; Bill Nelson

Be-Bop Deluxe chronology
Modern Music (1976)	Drastic Plastic (1978)	The Best of and the Rest of Be-Bop Deluxe (1978)

Singles from Drastic Plastic
- 1. "Panic in the World" Released: January 1978; 2. "Electrical Language" Released: May 1978

Drastic Plastic is the fifth and final album by English rock band Be-Bop Deluxe, released in February 1978.

== Recording and content ==
Drastic Plastic was recorded in Chateau Saint Georges, Juan-les-Pins, in the south of France in the summer of 1977. Nelson recorded the album in Chateau Saint Georges, because he was inspired by the relation of the place with artist Jean Cocteau, who influenced him in the 1960s.

== Composition ==
The sound of Drastic Plastic is different from the previous albums, showing changes in the musical direction of the band. This sound has been classified as art rock and new wave.

The song "Islands of the Dead" is a song dedicated to Nelson's father, Walter, who died in 1976.

== Release ==
Drastic Plastic was released in February 1978 by record label Harvest. It was re-released in early 1990 with three bonus tracks while an expanded version appeared in 2021.

The band split up shortly after releasing the album. By the time of the disbanding, Nelson was writing material intended to be part of the Be-Bop Deluxe repertoire, but instead played by his next band, Red Noise, formed alongside keyboardist Andy Clark and Nelson's brother Ian. Red Noise released an album with more electronic-based music than Drastic Plastic, Sound-on-Sound, in 1979. That band and album were considered as post-Be-Bop Deluxe. Shortly afterwards, Nelson decided to continue his career as soloist, releasing more synthpop albums.

Nelson only maintained Andy Clark for his Red Noise project. After Be-Bop Deluxe split, bassist Charlie Tumahai played with other bands in Britain seven more years, returning to his native New Zealand in 1985, where he joined reggae band Herbs, continuing his career until his death in 1995. Simon Fox worked with Trevor Rabin, formed Blazer Blazer and joined The Pretty Things. After Red Noise, Andy Clark contributed to selected tracks on David Bowie's 1980 album Scary Monsters (And Super Creeps) and the first two albums by The dBs.

== Critical reception ==
Professional ratings
Review scores
Source	Rating
Q	3/5 stars

The Globe and Mail wrote that "'New Precision' and 'Islands of the Dead' are among the most aimless Nelson has ever penned, but 'Surreal Estate' and 'Japan' rank among his best".

Q described the album as a "respectable swansong".

== Track listing ==
All songs written by Bill Nelson.

1. "Electrical Language" – 4:50
2. "New Precision" – 4:30
3. "New Mysteries" – 4:44
4. "Surreal Estate" – 5:00
5. "Love in Flames" – 4:09
6. "Panic in the World" – 5:04
7. "Dangerous Stranger" – 3:05
8. "Superenigmatix (Lethal Appliances for the Home with Everything)" – 2:10
9. "Visions of Endless Hopes" – 2:23
10. "Possession" – 2:34
11. "Islands of the Dead" – 3:45

The U.S. release (SW-11750) dropped "Visions of Endless Hopes" and inserted "Japan" – 2:34

=== CD reissue bonus tracks ===
1. "Blimps" – 2:46
2. "Lovers Are Mortal" – 4:54
3. "Lights" – 2:43

== Personnel ==
- Bill Nelson – electric, acoustic and 12-string guitars, lead vocals, mandolin, guitar synthesizer, piano, percussion
- Andy Clark – keyboards and synthesizers
- Charlie Tumahai – bass guitar, backing vocals
- Simon Fox – drums, loops

== Charts ==
Chart (1978)	Peak position
UK Albums (OCC)	22
US Billboard 200	95

Chart (2021)	Peak position
Scottish Albums (OCC)	31
UK Independent Albums (OCC)	14
UK Progressive Albums (OCC)	4
