= Sound on Sound =

British music technology magazine

- Cover of November 2024 issue
- Categories: Music technology
- Frequency: Monthly
- Publisher: SOS Publications Group
- Founded: 1985
- Based in: Cambridge, England
- Language: English
- Website: soundonsound.com
- ISSN: 0951-6816

Sound on Sound is a monthly music technology magazine. The magazine includes product tests of electronic musical performance and recording devices, and interviews with industry professionals. Due to its technical focus, it is predominantly aimed at the professional recording studio market as well as artist project studios and home recording enthusiasts.

Independently owned, the magazine is published by SOS Publications Group in Cambridge, United Kingdom.

== History ==
The magazine was conceived, created and founded by brothers Ian and Paul Gilby and their friend Godfrey Davies in 1985. It was originally launched in 1985 on the UK Channel 4 television programme, The Tube, championing the convergence of MIDI, computer technology and recording equipment. At the time of its launch, text for the magazine was edited on BBC Model B computers and pages were physically pasted together with wax. The modern magazine is full-colour throughout and led the way in using colour as much as possible through its pages when other magazines used colour only for the front cover and special features.

In 1998, SOS Publications opened a website parallel to the magazine, digitising all of the print articles since January 1994 and providing additional, supplementary, content including audio and video files. The website grew to include a discussion forum, a subscribers area, a directory of professionals and companies in the music recording and technology sector and a shop through which browsers could purchase back issues of the magazine alongside merchandise, PDF articles and new subscriptions to the print edition.

In January 2008, the website expanded to include podcasts and videos featuring interviews, product demonstrations, featured articles and news stories. The magazine is a regular attendee of worldwide music technology conferences and events such as AES, the NAMM Show, NAB, IBC and Musikmesse, and regularly publishes articles, videos and podcasts reporting from these events.

A sister magazine, Performing Musician which covered all aspects of live performance, was launched in early 2008, but closed at the end of 2009.

The magazine was named after the Bill Nelson's Red Noise album Sound-on-Sound and as of 2003 the website had a Bill Nelson Shop section in which this musician's independently produced CDs could be bought.

== Features ==
Alongside monthly product tests, the magazine features regular DAW columns which focus on software for use with Microsoft and Apple computers respectively. There is also a monthly collection of "Techniques" articles which provide how-to advice on specific audio equipment and software.

Each issue includes several feature articles with specific foci:

- "Classic Tracks": history and discussion of a popular 'classic' track or band often featuring interviews with the artists and collaborators
- "Inside Track": interviews and discussion in a 'making of' style with the artists behind selected tracks
- "Studio SOS": charting the members of the SOS team assisting in the makeover of an existing reader's studio, complete with the reader reaction
- "Mix Rescue": a reader's multitrack mix is reworked by the SOS team to improve the results

In addition, the magazine features several 'regular' elements that provide further information and insight into music recording and technology. These include:

- "Q & A": a selection of readers' questions researched and answered by the editorial team
- "Why I Love...": a 'guest' column written by readers discussing issues in the music industry.

=== Reviews ===
Sound on Sound does not provide ratings for the products it reviews, however it does provide several boxes of information accompanying each product review in order to help readers make up their own minds about specific products. These include:

- Sound on Sound verdict box including a balance of pros and cons with a summary statement
- Alternatives which suggest products similar to the one being reviewed but highlighting their difference in price, features, quality etc.
- Key information about the product including cost, manufacturer's contact details and further information for purchase enquiries

== Publications ==
=== Back issues ===
All news and articles printed in the magazine since January 1994 have also been published online via its website, often including rich media content such as video and audio files that correspond to the content of individual articles. The articles printed in the magazine before January 1994 have been digitised and are hosted by the Mu:zines magazine archive.

=== Special issues ===
In 2005, Sound on Sound celebrated its 20th birthday by providing a series of 3 cover mounted DVD-roms with the magazine, one released in March, August and November. The DVD-roms featured extra content not available on the website or in the magazine including several featured articles, a selection of reader demo tracks, tutorials on various aspects of music recording, samples for readers to use in their own compositions, and additional resources.

=== Foreign editions ===
- Brazilian – The Brazilian edition was launched in Brazil in 2010. It includes articles translated from the UK magazine.
- North America – In 2001 a North American edition was added and includes all of the articles from the UK edition as well as local distributor contact details and dollar prices, and US advertising.

== SOS Awards ==
In September 2010, Sound on Sound set up an annual awards competition enabling subscribers of the magazine to vote for a range of products, the winners of each category to be announced in the next Winter NAMM show (usually held in January). Voting entered subscribers into a prize draw.
