= Blue Moons & Laughing Guitars =

Demo album by Bill Nelson
- Released: August 1992
- Recorded: Early 1990s
- Studio: Rose-Croix (Yorkshire, England)
- Length: 56:48
- Label: Caroline; Venture

Bill Nelson chronology
Luminous (1991)	Blue Moons & Laughing Guitars (1992)	Crimsworth (1995)

Singles from Blue Moons & Laughing Guitars
- 1. "The Dead We Wake with Upstairs Dreams" Released: 1992

Blue Moons & Laughing Guitars is a demo album by the English musician Bill Nelson, released in August 1992 on Caroline and Venture Records.

== Background and recording ==
In the early 1990s, Bill Nelson recorded a series of demos at his home studio, Rose-Croix, in Yorkshire, England. Mostly recorded in a time frame of a few hours, the songs were originally intended to be developed further with a new band called the Perfect Serpents, which would have consisted of four guitarists and two drummers. The group ultimately failed to materialise, and Nelson decided to release the demos in their unfinished state. By that point in Nelson's career, the album marked a significant shift in focus back to song-based structures.

== Single and release ==
Blue Moons & Laughing Guitars, was released in August 1992 by Caroline and Venture Records. That year, Venture released a CD single of the album track "The Dead We Wake with Upstairs Dreams".

== Critical reception ==
Professional ratings
Review scores
Source	Rating
AllMusic	4/5 stars
The Encyclopedia of Popular Music	3/5 stars
The Great Rock Discography	6/10

Mac Randall of Musician said that besides a few "sketchy" tracks, the album contains "tasty examples of Nelsonian pop" that demonstrate he is still an adept songwriter. In another magazine, Audio, joint reviewers Jon and Sally Tiven were more mixed, opining that while there are some "enjoyable moments", the songs could have afforded to be more ambitious for a guitarist and songwriter of Nelson's stature.

In a retrospective assessment, Chris Nickson of AllMusic said that at the time, other musicians had often recorded better at home, but the album's other qualities—such as Nelson's guitar playing—exceed the demo's imperfections, making them wish that the original concept of the Perfect Serpents had been adequately funded. Nickson highlighted "Ancient Guitars", "Angel in My System", and "The Invisible Man and the Unforgettable Girl" as among the record's best tracks.

== Track listing ==
All tracks are written by Bill Nelson.

Blue Moons & Laughing Guitars track listing
No.	Title	Length
1.	"Ancient Guitars"	2:04
2.	"Girl from Another Planet"	2:29
3.	"Spinnin' Around"	4:12
4.	"Shaker"	2:35
5.	"God Man Slain"	4:07
6.	"The Dead We Wake with Upstairs Drums"	3:22
7.	"New Moon Rising"	4:01
8.	"The Glory Days"	3:57
9.	"Wishes"	2:22
10.	"Angel in My System"	4:28
11.	"Wings and Everything"	4:09
12.	"Boat to Forever"	3:29
13.	"The Invisible Man and the Unforgettable Girl"	3:46
14.	"So It Goes"	3:50
15.	"Fires in the Sky"	4:04
16.	"Dream Ships Set Sail"	3:47
Total length:		56:48

== Personnel ==
Credits are adapted from the cassette liner notes.

- Bill Nelson – vocals, Yamaha electric guitar, Ovation acoustic guitars, Yamaha DX7, E-mu Emax, mixing, mastering, sleeve concept
- Peter Ashworth – photography, set construction
- Wherefore Art? – design
