= Futurama (Be-Bop Deluxe album) =

Studio album by Be-Bop Deluxe
- Released: July 1975
- Recorded: 1975
- Studio: Rockfield Studios, Wales; Sarm Studios, London; Abbey Road Studios, London
- Genre: Progressive rock
- Length: 35:31
- Label: Harvest
- Producer: Roy Thomas Baker

Be-Bop Deluxe chronology
| Axe Victim (1974) | Futurama (1975) | Sunburst Finish (1976) |

Futurama is the second album by the band Be-Bop Deluxe, released in 1975 and generally classified musically as a progressive rock album.

== Background and recording ==
After the line-up of Be-Bop Deluxe changed, the band recorded the album with founder member Bill Nelson (guitars, keyboards and vocals), Charlie Tumahai (bass and backing vocals) and Simon Fox (drums). The album was recorded at Rockfield Studios in Wales and produced by Roy Thomas Baker, who also produced Queen.

== Release ==
Futurama was released in July 1975 by record label Harvest.

Subsequently, in October 1976, "Maid in Heaven" reached number 36 in the UK singles charts as the lead track on the Hot Valves EP. The American market was harder to break for British acts during the 1970s due to the hangover from the 1960s and problems with availability of records in the US for breaking acts such as Be-Bop Deluxe, whose first album Axe Victim was only available as an import.

The album was re-released in early 1991 with three bonus tracks.

== Reception ==
Professional ratings
Review scores
| Source | Rating |
|---|---|
| AllMusic | 2/5 stars |
| Q | 3/5 stars |

Although critics were not always open to the mix of styles, Be-Bop and Nelson's music received a fairly warm welcome from the music critic of The New York Times. John Rockwell started his article with a fairly scathing dismissal of English musical acts:

"Every month or is it week? seems to bring a new rock band from Britain, eager to catch a few leftover crumbs from the Anglophilia of the 1960s. Most fail completely; others latch onto an FM cult success; a very few, unpredictably, make it big..."

Although his opening seems to dismiss British music as hanging on to fame gained during the 1960s, Rockwell goes on to say:

"Be-Bop Deluxe is redeemed by the brilliance of [the band's] playing, and particularly Nelson's guitar playing. His records put Nelson right up there with the other great masters of the electric guitar."

In The Rough Guide to Rock, Peter Buckley described the album as:

"Top-heavy with massed guitars and melodic ideas pursued on a whim and just as quickly abandoned, it nevertheless contained two of the most perfect pop singles never to make the charts – 'Maid in Heaven' and 'Sister Seagull'."

Q described the album as ' an accomplished melding of pomp, prog and pop'.

== Track listing ==
All tracks are written by Bill Nelson

| No. | Title | Length |
|---|---|---|
| 1. | "Stage Whispers" | 3:05 |
| 2. | "Love with the Madman" | 3:12 |
| 3. | "Maid in Heaven" | 2:26 |
| 4. | "Sister Seagull" | 3:36 |
| 5. | "Sound Track" | 6:15 |
| 6. | "Music in Dreamland" | 4:44 |
| 7. | "Jean Cocteau" | 2:53 |
| 8. | "Between the Worlds" | 3:17 |
| 9. | "Swan Song" | 6:03 |
| 10. | "Between the Worlds" (original single version; bonus track) | 3:19 |
| 11. | "Maid in Heaven" (recorded live in 1977; bonus track) | 2:33 |
| 12. | "Speed of the Wind" (bonus track) | 4:19 |

== Personnel ==
Be-Bop Deluxe

- Bill Nelson – guitar, lead and backing vocals, keyboards
- Charlie Tumahai – Fender bass, backing vocals
- Simon Fox – drums, percussion

with:

- Andy Evans – bass on "Jean Cocteau"
- The Grimethorpe Colliery Band – brass band on "Music in Dreamland"; conducted by John Berryman; arranged by Sir Peter Oxendale

Technical

- Gary Lyons, Pat Moran – engineer
- George Hardie – cover art, design

== Charts ==
| Chart (2019) | Peak position |
|---|---|
| Scottish Albums (OCC) | 100 |
| UK Independent Albums (OCC) | 26 |
| UK Progressive Albums (OCC) | 6 |
