= Be-Bop Deluxe =

English rock band (1972–1978)

- Bill Nelson fronting the band at Massey Hall, Toronto, 1977

Background information
- Origin: Wakefield, West Yorkshire, England
- Genres: Art rock; glam rock; progressive rock
- Years active: 1972–1978
- Label: Harvest
- Past members: Bill Nelson; Robert Bryan; Nicholas Chatterton-Dew; Ian Parkin; Richard Brown; Simon Fox; Paul Jeffreys; Milton Reame-James; Charlie Tumahai; Andrew Clark

Be-Bop Deluxe were an English rock band who achieved critical acclaim and moderate commercial success during the mid to late 1970s.

== History ==
=== Be-Bop Deluxe ===
Be-Bop Deluxe were founded in Wakefield, West Yorkshire, England, by singer, guitarist and principal songwriter Bill Nelson in 1972. The founding line-up consisted of Nelson, guitarist Ian Parkin, bassist and vocalist Robert Bryan, drummer Nicholas Chatterton-Dew, and keyboardist Richard Brown (who left in December of that year). They started off playing the West Yorkshire pub scene, with one regular venue being the Staging Post in Whinmoor, Leeds. They never played bebop music, but instead came out of the blues-based British rock scene of the late 1960s. At first they were compared to the more successful David Bowie, but Nelson never tried to copy Bowie, and appears to have disliked comparisons or being pigeon-holed.

After signing to EMI's Harvest Records subsidiary, the initial line-up of the band only lasted for one album, 1974's Axe Victim, and a short tour. It seems that the band were badly managed and were given little time for rehearsal by a cash-strapped manager, desperate to make money, with the inevitable result that, shortly after this, Nelson dissolved the band and reformed with a new line-up with bassist Paul Jeffreys, keyboardist Milton Reame-James (both formerly of Cockney Rebel), and drummer Simon Fox, the latter introduced by Reame-James to Nelson. Jeffreys and Reame-James soon departed the band, and New Zealand-born bassist-vocalist Charlie Tumahai (formerly of Australian bands Mississippi and Healing Force) joined in late 1974. This line-up recorded 1975's Futurama album (produced by Roy Thomas Baker, the then-producer for Queen) and was then supplemented by keyboardist Andrew Clark for the subsequent tour, after which Clark joined the band. This final line-up remained constant until the band's dissolution in 1978. Jeffreys died in the bombing of Pan Am Flight 103 over Lockerbie, Scotland in 1988.

Stylistically, the songs took elements from progressive rock, glam rock (the band had flirted with make-up in the early days), and hard guitar rock. "Ships in the Night", taken from the band's third album Sunburst Finish, was their most successful single in both the UK and the US. The single features an alto saxophone solo by Ian Nelson. The album was notably the first to be produced by EMI employee John Leckie, who had hitherto worked for the company as a recording engineer, in which capacity he had served on Axe Victim, which he also in effect produced. Leckie would go on to produce all the subsequent Be-Bop Deluxe and Bill Nelson's Red Noise albums for Harvest, including the proposed Red Noise album Quit Dreaming and Get on the Beam that Harvest refused to release. Nelson shared producing credits with Leckie from Drastic Plastic onward.

The first three Be-Bop Deluxe albums are all, in one way or another, named after guitars. "Axe" is slang for a guitar, "Futurama" is a particular make of guitar, while "Sunburst Finish" refers to a style of finishing for the instrument.

The title track of the fourth album, Modern Music, was a ten-minute suite of songs inspired by the experience of the band's touring the US. This was followed by the 1977 live album, Live! in the Air Age, recorded on the subsequent UK tour promoting Modern Music although no songs from that studio album appeared on the live one, apart from a tantalizing snippet of the audience singing along to "Down on Terminal Street". That recording – now featuring the song in its entirety – and a number of other live Modern Music tracks finally surfaced on 2011's five-CD set Futurist Manifesto.

1978's Drastic Plastic, recorded at Juan-Les-Pins in the South of France with influences of punk, new wave, and David Bowie's Berlin Trilogy, was a substantial stylistic change from the progressive/guitar rock of the early Be-Bop Deluxe. Eager to embrace the changing musical landscape, Nelson dissolved Be-Bop Deluxe.

The band appeared three times on the BBC's The Old Grey Whistle Test, performing a total of six songs, and once on Top of the Pops, with their 1976 single, "Ships in the Night". For the band's Sight & Sound concert in 1978, the setlist was made up entirely of tracks from the Drastic Plastic album.

=== After Be-Bop Deluxe ===
Immediately thereafter, Nelson formed a new band, Bill Nelson's Red Noise, retaining Andy Clark on keyboards, and adding his brother Ian on saxophone, in which capacity the latter had previously contributed to "Ships in the Night". An album followed. Nelson has subsequently released numerous albums and singles under his own name, frequently playing all instruments himself.

Nelson planned a four-guitarist, two-drummer band in the 1990s with his brother, but it never materialised; in 1992, Nelson released his own demos for this band as Blue Moons & Laughing Guitars on Virgin. In 1995, former Be-Bop Deluxe members Ian Parkin and Charlie Tumahai both died. In February, 2003, Bill was asked to open the new East Coast Music Academy in Grimsby, where he met Nick Dew. This led to an invitation for Nick to play drums in 'The Lost Satellites' at the October 2003 'Nelsonica' Fan Convention held at the Duke of Cumberland pub in North Ferriby. In 2004, Sound on Sound magazine, whose website hosts Nelson's online shop and is named after Red Noise's Sound-on-Sound album, put up the money for Nelson to take his seven-piece band Bill Nelson and the Lost Satellites, originally formed to play the 2002 Nelsonica convention, on tour around the UK as The Be Bop Deluxe and Beyond Tour. The drummer for the tour was Nick Dew who, under the name Nicholas Chatterton-Dew, had played with Be-Bop Deluxe in the early days. The sax player was Ian Nelson, who died two years later in 2006.

Nelson subsequently put together the seven-piece Bill Nelson and the Gentlemen Rocketeers, which included Dave Sturt (bass) and Theo Travis (assorted woodwind, brass), and, once again, Nick Dew on drums, to play songs with vocals from the extensive Be-Bop Deluxe/Bill Nelson back catalogue at his annual Nelsonica event in Yorkshire. In March 2011, the band played live to cameras at Metropolis Studios, London. Initially released on DVD, the resultant video and audio recording has subsequently been reissued on other formats including CD and LP. However, having signed away his rights to these recordings, Nelson has made no money on any of the Metropolis Studios releases.

In 2011, EMI upgraded the Be-Bop Deluxe catalogue with remasters by Peter Mew. EMI and Bill Nelson chose to include all of the band's albums, single edits, and B-sides as part of this release with the exception of the pre-Axe Victim, independently released Smile single "Teenage Archangel" / "Jets At Dawn". Although Nelson did not supervise the release, he gave final approval on the remasters and agreed to provide a disc of rarities to help sell the set, if EMI paid him royalties on the release. The two Smile tracks can be found on the compilation Postcards from the Future... Introducing Be-Bop Deluxe (2004) and Nelson's 40-year career retrospective, eight CD set, The Practice of Everyday Life (2011).

Despite Be-Bop Deluxe's commercial success, Bill Nelson stated that he had never received royalties for the earlier CD release of his back catalog on EMI until the 2011 CD reissue/remaster of his back catalogue.

Between 2018 and 2022, Cherry Red Records' subsidiary Esoteric Recordings, who had been rolling out re-releases of Nelson's back catalogue for many of his releases between 1981 and 2002 with the 8-CD compilation The Practice of Everyday Life which covered 40 years of recordings, including the Be-Bop Deluxe period, released expanded, multiple CD versions of the Be-Bop Deluxe albums and the Bill Nelson's Red Noise album, having acquired the rights from EMI.

In the fall of 2024, it was reported in forums on drumforum.com and billnelson.com that Simon Fox had died in mid-September of that year at the age of 75.

== Musical style ==
Be-Bop Deluxe were initially a glam rock band that incorporated elements of progressive rock, blues, and folk rock into their musical style. After the band received unfavourable comparisons to the music of David Bowie, leader Bill Nelson initiated a shift in the band's style to emphasise a more experimental sound. This new sound has been classified as art rock, heavy metal, progressive rock, pop rock, and progressive pop. With their final album, Drastic Plastic, Be-Bop Deluxe again expanded their style to include influences of new wave music. Science fiction imagery was common in the lyrics, along with the more traditional themes of love and the human condition.

== Members ==
- Bill Nelson – lead guitar, lead vocals, keyboards (1972–1978)
- Robert Bryan – bass, backing and lead vocals (1972–1974)
- Nicholas Chatterton-Dew – drums, backing vocals, percussion (1972–1974)
- Ian Parkin – rhythm and acoustic guitars, organ (1972–1974; died 1995)
- Richard Brown – keyboards (1972)
- Simon Fox – drums, percussion (1974–1978; died 2024)
- Paul Jeffreys – bass (1974; died 1988)
- Milton Reame-James – keyboards (1974)
- Charlie Tumahai – bass, backing vocals (1974–1978; died 1995)
- Andrew Clark – keyboards (1975–1978)

=== Timeline ===
Line-ups

1972	1972–1974	1974	1974–1975
Bill Nelson – lead guitar, lead and backing vocals, keyboards; Richard Brown – keyboards; Robert Bryan – bass, backing and lead vocals; Nicholas Chatterton-Dew – drums, backing vocals, percussion; Ian Parkin – rhythm and acoustic guitars	Bill Nelson – lead guitar, lead and backing vocals, keyboards; Robert Bryan – bass, backing and lead vocals; Nicholas Chatterton-Dew – drums, backing vocals, percussion; Ian Parkin – rhythm and acoustic guitars, organ	Bill Nelson – guitars, vocals, keyboards; Simon Fox – drums, percussion; Paul Jeffreys – bass; Milton Reame-James – keyboards	Bill Nelson – guitars, lead vocals, keyboards; Simon Fox – drums, percussion; Charlie Tumahai – bass, backing vocals
1975–1978
Bill Nelson – guitars, lead vocals, keyboards; Simon Fox – drums, percussion; Charlie Tumahai – bass, backing vocals; Andrew Clark – keyboards

== Discography ==
=== Studio albums ===
Title	Year	Release details	Peak chart positions			Certifications
Title	Year	Release details	UK	UK Indie	SCOT	Certifications
Axe Victim	1974	Released: June 1974; Label: Harvest	—	10	37	
Futurama	1975	Released: July 1975; Label: Harvest	—	26	100	
Sunburst Finish	1976	Released: February 1976; Label: Harvest; EMI; Capitol	17	24	—	BPI: Silver
Modern Music	1976	Released: 3 September 1976; Label: Harvest	12	33	—	BPI: Silver
Drastic Plastic	1978	Released: February 1978; Label: Harvest	22	14	31	
"—" denotes a recording that did not chart or was not released in that territory.

=== Live albums ===
Title	Release details	Peak chart positions			Notes
Title	Release details	UK	UK Indie	SCOT	Notes
Live! in the Air Age	Released: July 1977; Label: Harvest	10	7	18	
Radioland: BBC Radio 1 Live in Concert	Released: October 1994; Label: Windsong International	—	—	—	(Note: Radioland... (1994) was later remastered and re-released as Tremulous Antenna (2002).)
"—" denotes a recording that did not chart or was not released in that territory.

=== Singles ===
Title	Year	Peak chart positions	Album	Notes
Title	Year	UK	Album	Notes
"Teenage Archangel"	1973	—	Non-album single	
"Jet Silver and the Dolls of Venus"	1974	—	Axe Victim	
"Between the Worlds"	1975	—	Futurama	(Note: The single "Between the Worlds" (1985) was withdrawn shortly after release.)
"Maid in Heaven"	1975	—	Futurama	
"Ships in the Night"	1976	23	Sunburst Finish	
"Kiss of Light"	1976	—	Modern Music	
"Japan"	1977	—	Non-album single	
"Panic in the World"	1978	—	Drastic Plastic	
"Electrical Language"	1978	—	Drastic Plastic	
"—" denotes a recording that did not chart or was not released in that territory.

=== Compilations ===
==== Albums ====
Title	Year	Release details
The Best of and the Rest of Be Bop Deluxe	1978	Released: October 1978; Label: Harvest
The Singles As & Bs	1981	Released: June 1981; Label: Harvest
Axe Victim / Futurama	1983	Released: 1983; Label: EMI
Bop to the Red Noise	1986	Released: August 1986; Label: Dojo
The Best of Be-Bop Deluxe: Raiding the Divine Archive	1987	Released: March 1987; Label: Harvest
Air Age Anthology	1997	Released: February 1997; Label: EMI
Tramcar to Tomorrow	1998	Released: August 1998; Label: Hux
The Very Best of Be Bop Deluxe	1998	Released: 1998; Label: Collectables; EMI-Capitol Special Markets
Postcards from the Future... Introducing Be Bop Deluxe	2004	Released: 20 September 2004; Label: EMI
Futurist Manifesto: The Harvest Years 1974-1978	2012	Released: October 2012; Label: Harvest
At the BBC 1974-1978	2013	Released: 30 September 2013; Label: Parlophone
Original Album Series	2014	Released: June 2014; Label: Parlophone

==== Extended plays ====
Title	Release details	Peak chart positions
Title	Release details	UK
Hot Valves	Released: October 1976; Label: Harvest	36

=== Compilation appearances ===
==== Albums ====
Title	Release details
Electrotype: The Holyground Recordings 1968-1972	Released: February 2001; Label: Holyground
The Practice of Everyday Life: Celebrating 40 Years of Recordings	Released: December 2011; Label: Esoteric

==== Singles box sets ====
Title	Release details
Permanent Flame (The Beginners Guide to Bill Nelson)	Released: November 1983; Label: Cocteau

=== DVDs ===
- Picture House (2010) [Bill Nelson] Nelsonica convention DVD includes Be-Bop Deluxe in the South of France, Nelson's video diary shot during the Drastic Plastic sessions Visuluxe
- Be-Bop Deluxe at the BBC 1974–78 (2013) 3-CD + DVD box set of previously unreleased material + material from Tramcar to Tomorrow (most tracks) and Tremulous Antenna (all tracks) + televised performances EMI
- Classic Rock Magazine Legends Bill Nelson and the Gentlemen Rocketeers filmed live at Metropolis Studios (2011) [Bill Nelson and the Gentlemen Rocketeers] performance of songs from Be-Bop Deluxe/Bill Nelson's back catalogue ITV Studios Home Entertainment

== Bibliography ==
- Reeves, Paul Sutton Music in Dreamland Bill Nelson & Be-Bop Deluxe (2008) Helter Skelter publishing ISBN 978-1-900924-04-7
