= Modern Music (Be-Bop Deluxe album) =

Studio album by Be-Bop Deluxe
- Released: 3 September 1976
- Recorded: June – July 1976
- Studio: Abbey Road, London
- Length: 42:29
- Label: Harvest; EMI; Capitol
- Producer: Bill Nelson; John Leckie

Be-Bop Deluxe chronology
| Sunburst Finish (1976) | Modern Music (1976) | Drastic Plastic (1978) |

Professional ratings
Review scores
| Source | Rating |
|---|---|
| Q | 2/5 stars |

Modern Music is the fourth studio album by English rock band Be-Bop Deluxe. It was produced by band leader Bill Nelson and producer/engineer John Leckie. As AllMusic reviewer William Ruhlmann states in his review, "the album charted high in England and made the Top 100 in the U.S., but it was Be Bop's peak, not its breakthrough."

It was re-released in early 1991 with three bonus tracks. Q Magazine described the album as "less impressive [with] convoluted poetical ramblings [and] indulgent twoddling".

== Track listing ==
All tracks are written by Bill Nelson.

Side one
| No. | Title | Length |
|---|---|---|
| 1. | "Orphans of Babylon" | 3:15 |
| 2. | "Twilight Capers" | 4:25 |
| 3. | "Kiss of Light" | 3:11 |
| 4. | "The Bird Charmers Destiny" | 1:21 |
| 5. | "The Gold at the End of My Rainbow" | 3:53 |
| 6. | "Bring Back the Spark" | 3:41 |

Side two
| No. | Title | Length |
|---|---|---|
| 1. | "Modern Music" | 3:41 |
| 2. | "Dancing in the Moonlight (All Alone)" | 2:10 |
| 3. | "Honeymoon on Mars" | 1:22 |
| 4. | "Lost in the Neon World" | 0:47 |
| 5. | "Dance of the Uncle Sam Humanoids" | 2:12 |
| 6. | "Modern Music (reprise)" | 1:39 |
| 7. | "Forbidden Lovers" | 5:03 |
| 8. | "Down on Terminal Street" | 3:59 |
| 9. | "Make the Music Magic" | 1:57 |

43rd anniversary edition – disc one
| No. | Title | Length |
|---|---|---|
| 16. | "Shine" | 7:51 |

43rd anniversary edition – disc two: The New Stereo Mix
| No. | Title | Length |
|---|---|---|
| 1. | "Orphans of Babylon" | 3:15 |
| 2. | "Twilight Capers" | 4:25 |
| 3. | "Kiss of Light" | 3:11 |
| 4. | "The Bird Charmers Destiny" | 1:22 |
| 5. | "The Gold at the End of My Rainbow" | 3:52 |
| 6. | "Bring Back the Spark" | 3:42 |
| 7. | "Modern Music" | 3:41 |
| 8. | "Dancing in the Moonlight (All Alone)" | 2:09 |
| 9. | "Honeymoon on Mars" | 1:22 |
| 10. | "Lost in the Neon World" | 0:47 |
| 11. | "Dance of the Uncle Sam Humanoids" | 2:12 |
| 12. | "Modern Music (reprise)" | 1:39 |
| 13. | "Forbidden Lovers" | 5:03 |
| 14. | "Down on Terminal Street" | 4:00 |
| 15. | "Make the Music Magic" | 1:57 |
| 16. | "Shine" | 7:58 |
| 17. | "Forbidden Lovers" (first version) | 4:19 |
| 18. | "The Bird Charmers Destiny" (first version) | 1:51 |

43rd anniversary edition – disc three: Live at the Hammersmith Odeon 1976
| No. | Title | Length |
|---|---|---|
| 1. | "Maid in Heaven" | 3:07 |
| 2. | "Bring Back the Spark" | 3:45 |
| 3. | "Kiss of Light" | 3:16 |
| 4. | "Adventures in Yorkshire Landscape" | 9:38 |
| 5. | "Fair Exchange" | 4:42 |
| 6. | "Ships in the Night" | 3:51 |
| 7. | "Twilight Capers" | 4:31 |
| 8. | "Medley: Modern Music / Dancing in the Moonlight (All Alone) / Honeymoon on Mars / Lost in the Neon World / Dance of the Uncle Sam Humanoids / Modern Music (reprise)" | 12:45 |
| 9. | "Blazing Apostles" | 11:47 |

43rd anniversary edition – disc four: Live at the Rivera Theatre 1976
| No. | Title | Length |
|---|---|---|
| 1. | "Fair Exchange" | 4:57 |
| 2. | "Stage Whispers" | 3:02 |
| 3. | "Life in the Air Age" | 4:46 |
| 4. | "Sister Seagull" | 4:03 |
| 5. | "Adventures in a Yorkshire Landscape" | 9:13 |
| 6. | "Maid in Heaven" | 2:25 |
| 7. | "Ships in the Night" | 3:36 |
| 8. | "Bill's Blues" | 7:21 |
| 9. | "Blazing Apostles" | 17:17 |

43rd anniversary edition – disc five: The 5:1 Surround Sound Mix (DVD)
| No. | Title | Length |
|---|---|---|
| 1. | "Orphans of Babylon" | 3:15 |
| 2. | "Twilight Capers" | 4:25 |
| 3. | "Kiss of Light" | 3:11 |
| 4. | "The Bird Charmers Destiny" | 1:22 |
| 5. | "The Gold at the End of My Rainbow" | 3:52 |
| 6. | "Bring Back the Spark" | 3:42 |
| 7. | "Modern Music" | 3:41 |
| 8. | "Dancing in the Moonlight (All Alone)" | 2:09 |
| 9. | "Honeymoon on Mars" | 1:22 |
| 10. | "Lost in the Neon World" | 0:47 |
| 11. | "Dance of the Uncle Sam Humanoids" | 2:12 |
| 12. | "Modern Music (reprise)" | 1:39 |
| 13. | "Forbidden Lovers" | 5:03 |
| 14. | "Down on Terminal Street" | 4:00 |
| 15. | "Make the Music Magic" | 1:57 |
| 16. | "Shine" | 7:58 |
| 17. | "Forbidden Lovers" (first version) | 4:19 |
| 18. | "The Bird Charmers Destiny" (first version) | 1:51 |

== Personnel ==
Be-Bop Deluxe

- Bill Nelson - lead vocals, guitars, keyboards
- Andrew Clark - keyboards
- Charlie Tumahai - bass, backing vocals
- Simon Fox - drums

== Charts ==
| Chart (1976) | Peak position |
|---|---|
| UK Albums (OCC) | 12 |
| US Billboard 200 | 88 |

| Chart (2020) | Peak position |
|---|---|
| UK Independent Albums (OCC) | 33 |
| UK Progressive Albums (OCC) | 23 |

== Certifications ==
| Region | Certification | Certified units/sales |
|---|---|---|
| United Kingdom (BPI) | Silver | 60,000^{^} |
^{^} Shipments figures based on certification alone.
