= Andy Clark (musician) =

English keyboardist

- Also known as: Andrew Clark; Simon Clark
- Born: Simon Andrew Clark
- Genres: Progressive rock; glam rock; new wave; synth-pop
- Occupation: Musician
- Instruments: Keyboards; synthesiser
- Labels: Harvest; EMI
- Formerly of: Mother's Pride; Be-Bop Deluxe; Bill Nelson's Red Noise

Simon Andrew Clark is an English keyboardist best known for his work with guitarist Bill Nelson in Be-Bop Deluxe and their synth-pop offshoot Red Noise. One of his earlier involvements in music was as member of a progressive rock band from Sheffield, Yorkshire, called Mother's Pride.

== Life and career ==
Clark's original involvement with Be Bop Deluxe was as keyboardist for the band's live concerts in 1975. He could not work for them in the recording of their second album Futurama, because he was still maintaining contractual relationship with Mother's Pride. Shortly after, he joined, recording with them the next three studio albums, Sunburst Finish (1976), Modern Music (1977) and Drastic Plastic (1978), as well as the live album, Live! In The Air Age, before their disbandment. He was the only full-time member of the band to survive into Nelson's post-Be-Bop Deluxe project Red Noise. He was known as Andrew rather than Simon because Be-Bop Deluxe drummer Simon Fox insisted that two Simons in the band would cause confusion.

In 1980, Simon played synths on [[David Bowie's]] [[Scary Monsters]] album.
