= Bill Nelson (musician) =

English musician (born 1948)

- Nelson performing with Be-Bop Deluxe in 1977

Background information
- Born: William Nelson; 18 December 1948 (age 77); Wakefield, West Riding of Yorkshire, England
- Genres: Progressive rock; art rock; glam rock; electronic rock; new wave; post-punk; ambient
- Occupations: Musician; songwriter; artist; writer
- Instruments: Vocals; guitar; keyboards; drums; bass; percussion
- Works: Bill Nelson discography
- Years active: 1970–present
- Labels: Harvest/EMI; Enigma; Portrait/CVS; Cocteau; Twentythree; Populuxe; Virgin; Caroline; Sonoluxe; Mercury
- Formerly of: Be-Bop Deluxe; Bill Nelson's Red Noise
- Website: billnelson.com

William Nelson (born 18 December 1948) is an English singer, guitarist, songwriter, producer, painter, video artist, writer and experimental musician. He rose to prominence as the chief songwriter, vocalist and guitarist of the rock group Be-Bop Deluxe, which he formed in 1972. Nelson has been described as "one of the most underrated guitarists of the seventies art rock movement". In 2015, he was recognised with the Visionary award at the Progressive Music Awards.

== Personal life ==
Nelson was born in Wakefield in the West Riding of Yorkshire, to Jean and Walter Nelson. His father was an alto saxophone player, and his mother a dancer. Nelson's younger brother, Ian (1956–2006), collaborated on the Be-Bop Deluxe song "Ships in the Night" and formed the band Fiat Lux; he also played on the 1979 Red Noise album Sound-on-Sound and with the 2004 touring band Bill Nelson and the Lost Satellites.

Nelson has been married three times and has three children. In 1995 Nelson married Emiko Takahashi, who was previously married to Yellow Magic Orchestra drummer Yukihiro Takahashi.

== Career ==
=== 1970s ===
Nelson was educated at the Wakefield College of Art, where he developed an interest in the work of poet and filmmaker Jean Cocteau. At this time he was also developing as a musician, drawing upon Duane Eddy as a primary guitar influence.

His first record was a brief contribution on the album A-Austr: Musics from Holyground, with Brian Calvert, Chris Coombs, Ted Hepworth, Mike Levon and Brian Wilson. Levon recorded and produced the album which appeared on Levon's own Holyground Records label in 1970. After that, Nelson appeared in a much more substantial role with Lightyears Away on Astral Navigations released in 1971. On one track, "Yesterday", written by Coombs, Levon recorded Nelson's lead guitars in an acid rock style, supporting Coombs' stylophone riff. This track also gave Nelson his first airplay by John Peel on his national BBC Radio 1 programme in the United Kingdom. Nelson's Holyground recordings were released in February 2001 as Electrotype.

In 1973, Nelson's debut solo album Northern Dream, released on his own independent Smile label, drew further attention from Peel which eventually led to Nelson's band Be-Bop Deluxe signing to EMI's Harvest Records subsidiary and releasing Axe Victim in 1974. Nelson replaced the original band members for Futurama in 1975. The lineup of Bill Nelson (guitar), Andrew Clark (keyboards), Charlie Tumahai (bass) and Simon Fox (drums) recorded Sunburst Finish and Modern Music in 1976, the live album Live! In The Air Age in 1977 and their final studio album Drastic Plastic in 1978.

Nelson found the structure of a permanent band constricting. An instrumental on Drastic Plastic performed by Nelson (acoustic guitar) and Clark (keyboards) anticipated Nelson's later solo ambient work. Other tracks on that album required Fox record drum parts for use as repeating loop backing tracks in the studio. (Performing these songs live on the subsequent tour, Fox would physically play these repeating patterns on drums). This sowed the seeds for later experimentation by Nelson. 1983's Invisibility Exhibition tour would see Bill Nelson (guitar) and Ian Nelson (sax) improvise to the former's self-produced backing audio (and video) tracks (later released as the Chamber of Dreams album), an approach Nelson would repeat for many solo live performances throughout his career. Playing the guitar over pre-recorded backing tracks would bear further fruit in later studio recordings, notably the Painting With Guitars series (2003, 2015) and And We Fell into A Dream (2007).

In autumn 1978, Nelson halted the Be-Bop Deluxe project, removed Tumahai and Fox from his immediate working band and replaced the name with the moniker Red Noise (releasing the Sound-on-Sound album in February 1979). Harvest, who had insisted on naming it "Bill Nelson's Red Noise", refused to release the second Red Noise album Quit Dreaming and Get on the Beam which was largely recorded by Nelson with contributions on sax from his brother Ian rather than the more-obviously marketable five-piece band Harvest's execs had understandably expected. The record remained unreleased in record company limbo.

Meanwhile, with his producer from Harvest John Leckie, Nelson did some production (and, in Nelson's case, sessions keyboards) work for the band Skids, whose guitarist Stuart Adamson was an admirer of Nelson's musicianship. Fruitful friendships followed. Vocalist Richard Jobson would appear as a support act reading poetry on the Invisibility Exhibition tour. After Adamson's death in 2001, Nelson composed a piece in memory of his departed friend, called simply "For Stuart", which appeared on 2003's The Romance of Sustain Volume One: Painting With Guitars and (in a live version) on 2011's live at Metropolis Studios DVD.

=== 1980s ===
Nelson's manager Mark Rye negotiated with Harvest to buy back some of the unreleased songs for Nelson to release under his own name on his own label, Cocteau Records, which Nelson and Rye had set up. Consequently, in July 1980, Nelson was able to release the single "Do You Dream in Colour?", which after airplay on BBC Radio 1 reached no. 52 in the UK Singles Chart. This debut release on the label persuaded Phonogram to acquire the remaining tracks for Cocteau in order to release Quit Dreaming And Get on the Beam as a Bill Nelson album on their subsidiary label Mercury Records in 1981. The release contained bonus disc Sounding The Ritual Echo (Atmospheres for Dreaming) featuring experimental, ambient instrumentals which Nelson had recorded privately at his home.

Subsequent Mercury releases included The Love That Whirls, which included a bonus disc of Nelson's soundtrack for The Yorkshire Actors' stage production of Jean Cocteau's 1946 film La Belle et la Bête/Beauty and the Beast. Nelson had already contributed music (and released it under the title Das Kabinet on Cocteau) to the same company's similar adaptation of Robert Wiene's 1920 silent film classic The Cabinet of Dr. Caligari. It was followed by the six-track mini album Chimera in 1983, including collaborations with Yellow Magic Orchestra's Yukihiro Takahashi and Mick Karn, and featuring prominent use of synthesizers, sequencers and E-bow guitar. A single from the album, "Acceleration", subsequently reached no. 78 on the UK singles chart during a three week chart run.

Nelson released considerable quantities of singles and LPs on Cocteau throughout the decade, much of it by himself but also a number of singles by other artists, notably Last Man in Europe, A Flock of Seagulls, The Revox Cadets, Richard Jobson, Q (16), Fiat Lux, Man Jumping and Yukihiro Takahashi. The more ambitious Cocteau releases by Nelson himself included the four-LP box set of experimental electronic music Trial by Intimacy (The Book of Splendours) and the later ambient two-LP collection Chance Encounters in the Garden of Lights, which contained music informed by Nelson's Gnostic beliefs. In 1989, he released the 4-CD box set Demonstrations of Affection.

He was hired by English new wave artist Gary Numan to produce his 1983 album Warriors After Numan remixed some album tracks & B-sides, Nelson quit and chose not to be credited for his production role. Nelson also contributed towards several tracks on David Sylvian's Gone to Earth (1986). Nelson was commissioned by Channel 4 to write music for the 1987 television drama series Brond.

In 1986, a deal with CBS Records' Portrait imprint failed, leaving the one album Getting the Holy Ghost Across (US title: On a Blue Wing) with further tracks from that album's sessions issued on the UK mini-LP Living for the Spangled Moment. In 1988, Nelson signed to Enigma Records, which went out of business in 1992 after re-releasing his entire Cocteau catalogue.

In 1988 & 1989, Nelson suffered a series of personal setbacks, including a divorce, tax problems and an acrimonious dispute with his manager over his back catalogue rights. In the case of one album, the unreleased Simplex 1989, Nelson discovered his manager had been selling copies via mail order without Nelson's authorisation or knowledge; Nelson claimed he never received any royalties from these sales.

=== 1990s ===
In 1992, Nelson released Blue Moons & Laughing Guitars on Virgin, which consisted of demos for a proposed band including four guitarists and two drummers which never materialised. "This is what I do behind locked doors," he wrote on the sleeve, prefiguring much of his later, home recorded work including My Secret Studio 1995 (4-CD + 2-CD) and Noise Candy 1997 (6-CD). In the same year, Nelson worked with Roger Eno and Kate St John as producer (with Roger Eno) on the duo's album The Familiar, on which Nelson also played guitar and other instruments. This experience fortuitously not only sowed the seeds of Eno's, Nelson's and St.John's participation in the 'ambient supergroup' Channel Light Vessel, which also featured Laraaji and Mayumi Tachibana, but also introduced Nelson to Voiceprint Records, whose subsidiary labels included All Saints and Resurgence, both of which would release a number of CLV and Nelson recordings from 1994 til 1997.

In 1995, Nelson released two very different albums. Crimsworth (Flowers, Stones, Fountains And Flames) was an ambient piece which had provided the soundscape to an art installation. Practically Wired, or How I Became... Guitarboy! was a return to guitar-based instrumental music, something Nelson had barely touched for the previous decade and a half.

In 1996, Nelson augmented his sound with drum and bass for After the Satellite Sings, credited as a major influence on David Bowie's Earthling album by Bowie's then guitarist Reeves Gabrels.

By 1997, Nelson's troubles with his former manager were resolved in a lawsuit which enabled Nelson to recover much of his back catalogue. The fully authorised Simplex was subsequently released in 2001 by Lenin Imports and reissued in 2012 by Esoteric.

In 1997, Nelson created the Populuxe label, with a distribution arrangement via Robert Fripp's Discipline Global Mobile, but his relationship with them stagnated and Nelson's last release on that label was Atom Shop in 1998. Subsequent releases have been on other imprints such as Toneswoon as well as direct mail order (and later internet order) releases.

=== 2000s ===
2002 saw the release of EP Three White Roses & A Budd (with Fila Brazillia and Harold Budd) on Twentythree Records.

In 2001, Nelson attended a first Nelsonica convention, set up in West Yorkshire by fans in his honour, taking with him drawings to sell to any interested parties. It proved such a good experience that he resolved to contribute live music performances, dedicated CDs of new material, and anything else that seemed appropriate, to any such future events. Nelsonica became an annual fixture in his calendar for the next decade or so. Attendees at 2002's Nelsonica 02 received a copy of Astral Motel, the first convention CD release. Honeytone Cody played one set, Nelson and his brother Ian played a second, while Nelson's newly assembled seven piece band The Lost Satellites, which also included Ian, played a third. It was a resounding success and an annual institution was born.

Three further albums followed in 2003: The Romance of Sustain Volume One: Painting With Guitars, Plaything, and a second Nelsonica CD Luxury Lodge,. Since then, Nelson has released an average of four albums a year, often in small runs which soon go out of print. He has accomplished this using his own series of branded record labels: Almost Opaque then Discs of Ancient Odeon for the Nelsonica releases; Universal Twang then Sonoluxe for the others. (Nelson's Sonic Masonic imprint lasted for only one release, 2004's Satellite Songs)

Nelson's in-house releasing was made possible by the financial backing of Sound on Sound magazine, whose website hosts his online shop and is named after Red Noise's Sound-on-Sound album. In 2004, the magazine also put up the money for Nelson to take his band Bill Nelson and the Lost Satellites on tour around the UK as The Be-Bop Deluxe And Beyond Tour.

Nelson pursued different artistic directions. Two Rosewood releases contained acoustic guitar pieces "submitted to electronic and digital processing." The highly personal The Alchemical Adventures of Sailor Bill, was a concept album about the English coastline, ships and the sea, while its more ambient, instrumental companion piece Neptune's Galaxy comprised five long form instrumental compositions exploring the same subject. Of the former, Nelson wrote, "this set of songs comes (closer) to being personally fulfilling as almost any other album of mine." Most of the decade's remaining albums were lead electric guitar-oriented and non-vocal. Improvisation against pre-recorded backing tracks played a major role in And We Fell into A Dream while the very different Theatre of Falling Leaves eschewed lead guitar in favour of keyboards. The decade closed with more voice-based material as Nelson crooned through Golden Melodies of Tomorrow, delivered more familiar rock and ballad vocals on Fancy Planets and delved into romantic songwriting in The Dream Transmission Pavilion.

In the first half of the decade, Nelson published his collected online diaries from 1999–2003 under the title diary of a hyperdreamer. A second volume covering entries from 2005–2006 would appear in 2015. The last ten years of this diary remain on his official website to this day. He also gave extensive interviews to biographer Paul Sutton Reeves for a book, the publication of which was put on hold for around two years when publisher Sean Body died. Music in Dreamland: Bill Nelson & Be Bop Deluxe, finally materialised in 2008.

In the second half of the decade, Nelson's live performances (mostly at the Nelsonica events) broadened out from solo work to encompass two other bands. One was the improvisational, three-piece Orchestra Futura consisting of Nelson, Dave Sturt (bass) and Theo Travis (assorted woodwind, brass). (The duo of Sturt and Travis already played together as Cipher.) The other was the more conventional rock oriented, seven-piece Bill Nelson and the Gentlemen Rocketeers (again including Sturt and Travis) which played songs with vocals from the extensive Nelson/Be-Bop Deluxe back catalogue.

By 2005, Universal Music (UK) had re-issued three Mercury albums: Quit Dreaming and Get on the Beam, The Love that Whirls and Chimera had all been remastered and released with bonus tracks. Sonoluxe had reissued the CBS album Getting the Holy Ghost Across / On a Blue Wing with all the original tracks including those from Living for the Spangled Moment.

=== 2010s ===
In 2010, Nelson published the first part of an autobiography.

In March 2011, motivated by a desire to capture the flavour of recent gigs on film for posterity via DVD release, Bill Nelson and the Gentlemen Rocketeers played a concert of songs spanning Nelson's career before a live audience in front of in-house cameras at Metropolis Studios, London. Dissatisfied with the resultant sound mix, Nelson remixed it himself at his own expense. Using Nelson's remix, ITV Studios Home Entertainment released a DVD of the event. This initial release quickly sold out. A promised television broadcast of the recording only materialised in a few selected territories, excluding the UK. The video and audio recording has subsequently been reissued on other formats including CD and LP. However, having signed away his rights to these recordings, Nelson has made no money on these releases.

In 2011, Cherry Red Records' subsidiary Esoteric Recordings commenced a roll-out re-release of Nelson's back catalogue for many of his releases between 1981 and 2002 with the 8-CD compilation The Practice of Everyday Life which covered 40 years of recordings. Other notable reissues have included the 4-CD The Book of Splendours and the 6-CD Noise Candy. The Esoteric deal did not involve a rights buyout, so Nelson is properly compensated for these reissues.

In 2013, Nelson finally began releasing his out of print CD back catalogue from 2002 onwards as digital downloads via Bandcamp. On this platform he subsequently released the three volume compilation The Dreamer's Companion in 2014 and brand new albums commencing with Special Metal from 2016 onwards.

In addition to his numerous solo releases of recent years, Nelson has also made both film soundtracks and a number of collaborative recordings with other artists. In 2010, he released the soundtrack to the US TV documentary American Stamps as Picture Post while in 2014, he released the soundtrack to UK director Daisy Asquith's paean to cycling Velorama (a tie in with the 2014 Tour de France cycle race which went through Yorkshire) as Pedalscope. In 2012, Nelson finally completed The Last of the Neon Cynics, a long standing project with comic artist Matt Howarth: the latter supplied a comic (a PDF file) while the former provided a soundtrack to it. In 2014, he collaborated with fellow guitarist Reeves Gabrels (who has also worked with David Bowie and The Cure) on Fantastic Guitars.

In 2014, Nelson suffered a complete hearing loss in his right ear. This put a stop to any plans for playing live (and by extension Nelsonica events built around live performance) for the foreseeable future. Yet he continued to record and release music despite this disability. The first album to be affected was Quiet Bells. According to Nelson's sleeve notes, "to slowly adjust to this problem, I decided to make an album that features mainly guitar, a gentle collection of instrumentals in a neo-minimalist, ambient style."

In 2014, Nelson was honoured by Wakefield Council with a Hollywood-style star on the city’s walk of fame. He also designed an extremely limited edition 'Astroluxe Custom Ltd' guitar for the Eastwood company.

In 2016, 46 years after recording his debut album, Nelson released a sequel entitled New Northern Dream.

== Discography ==
Albums and singles in Bill Nelson's solo discography that have charted in any territory or are otherwise notable are listed below.

=== Selected solo discography ===
- Quit Dreaming and Get on the Beam (1981)
- The Love That Whirls (Diary of a Thinking Heart) (1982)
- Chimera (1983, mini-album)
- Getting the Holy Ghost Across (1986, released in the US as On a Blue Wing)
- Blue Moons & Laughing Guitars (1992, demo album)
- After the Satellite Sings (1996)
- Stand By: Light Coming (2019)
- Old Haunts (2019)
- The Jewel (2020)
- New Vibrato Wonderland (2020)
- Transcorder: The Acquitted by Mirrors Recordings (2020, compilation)
- My Private Cosmos (2021)
- Electra (In Search of the Golden Sound) (2022)
- All the Fun of the Fair (2023)
- Powertron (2024)

Singles

- "Do You Dream in Colour?" (1980, from Quit Dreaming and Get on the Beam)
- "Youth of Nation on Fire" (1981, from Quit Dreaming and Get on the Beam)
- "Acceleration" (1984, from Chimera)

=== With Be-Bop Deluxe ===
- Axe Victim (1974)
- Futurama (1975)
- Sunburst Finish (1976)
- Modern Music (1976)
- Hot Valves (1976, EP)
- Live! in the Air Age (1977, live)
- Drastic Plastic (1978)

Singles

- "Teenage Archangel" / "Jets at Dawn" (1973)
- "Jet Silver and the Dolls of Venus" / "Third Floor Heaven" (1974)
- "Between the Worlds" / "Lights" (1975, withdrawn)
- "Maid in Heaven" / "Lights" (1975)
- "Ships in the Night" / "Crying to the Sky" (1976)
- "Kiss of Light" / "Shine" (1976)
- "Japan" / "Futurist Manifesto" (1977)
- "Panic in the World" / "Blue as a Jewel" (1978)
- "Electrical Language" / "Surreal Estate" (1978)

=== Bill Nelson's Red Noise ===
- Sound-on-Sound (1979)

Singles

- "Furniture Music" / "Wonder Toys That Last Forever", "Acquitted by Mirrors" (1979)
- "Revolt into Style" / "Out of Touch" (1979)
- "Revolt into Style" / "Stay Young", "Out of Touch" (1979)

=== With Channel Light Vessel ===
- Automatic (1994)
- Excellent Spirits (1996)

=== Collaborative albums ===
- Culturemix with Bill Nelson (1995, with Culturemix)
- Three White Roses & a Budd (2002, EP with Harold Budd and Fila Brazillia)
- Fantastic Guitars (2014, with Reeves Gabrels)

== Bibliography ==
- Nelson, Bill (2004). Diary of a Hyperdreamer. Pomona. ISBN 1-904590-06-3. Bill Nelson's collected diaries from 1999 to 2003, previously published on his official website.
- Nelson, Bill Painted From Memory (Sketches for an Autobiography) Volume One: Evocation of a Radiant Childhood (2010) Autumn Ink Incorporated self-published
- Nelson, Bill diary of a hyperdreamer vol.2 (2015) Bill Nelson's collected diaries from between 2005 and 2006, previously published on his official website Pomona ISBN 978-190459-031-6
- Reeves, Paul Sutton (2008). Music in Dreamland Bill Nelson & Be Bop Deluxe. Helter Skelter Publishing. ISBN 978-1-900924-04-7.
