= Sunburst Finish (album) =

Studio album by Be-Bop Deluxe
- Released: February 1976
- Studios: Abbey Road Studios, London; Air Studios, London
- Genres: Art rock; pop rock; progressive pop
- Length: 39:47
- Label: Harvest
- Producers: John Leckie; Bill Nelson

Be-Bop Deluxe chronology
Futurama (1975)	Sunburst Finish (1976)	Modern Music (1976)

Singles from Sunburst Finish
- 1. "Ships in the Night" Released: February 1976

Professional ratings
Review scores
Source	Rating
Q	4/5 stars

Sunburst Finish is the third studio album by English rock band Be-Bop Deluxe, released in February 1976. It was recorded in Abbey Road Studios, London.

The album contains what would become one of their few forays into chart success; the February 1976 single "Ships in the Night", which reached number 23 in the UK Singles Chart.

Keyboardist Andy Clark, who had served as a temporary member during Be-Bop Deluxe's 1975 Futurama tour, joined the band as a full member for this album. He remained until the band was dissolved by Bill Nelson in 1978 and would be the only member of Be-Bop Deluxe apart from Bill Nelson to become part of Bill Nelson's Red Noise.

The album marked the production debut of John Leckie, who would later produce artists such as Simple Minds, XTC, The Stone Roses and Radiohead. It was re-released in early 1991 with three bonus tracks.

Q Magazine described it as the band's 'finest hour' where 'Bill's lyrical excesses are held in check while the band belt out track after track of uniquely futuristic pop'.

== Musical style ==
The music of Sunburst Finish has been classified as art rock, pop rock and progressive pop.

== Track listing ==
All songs written by Bill Nelson.

1. "Fair Exchange" – 4:49
2. "Heavenly Homes" – 3:36
3. "Ships in the Night" – 4:03
4. "Crying to the Sky" – 3:57
5. "Sleep That Burns" – 5:16
6. "Beauty Secrets" – 2:47
7. "Life in the Air Age" – 3:59
8. "Like an Old Blues" – 3:27
9. "Crystal Gazing" – 3:24
10. "Blazing Apostles" – 4:29
11. "Shine" (Reissue bonus track)
12. "Speed of the Wind" (Reissue bonus track)
13. "Blue as a Jewel" (Reissue bonus track)

== Personnel ==
Be-Bop Deluxe

- Bill Nelson – lead vocals, guitars, harmonica, tubular bells, percussion, cover concept
- Andy Clark – keyboards
- Charlie Tumahai – bass guitar, backing vocals, percussion
- Simon Fox – drums, percussion

with:

- Ian Nelson – alto saxophone on "Ships in the Night"
- Andrew Powell – orchestral arrangements on "Like an Old Blues" and "Crystal Gazing"

== Cover photograph ==
John Thornton photographed the cover based on a concept by Mike Doud. The model was Nicki Howorth.

== Charts ==
Chart (1976)	Peak position
UK Albums (Official Charts)	17
US Billboard 200	96

Chart (2018-19)	Peak position
UK Independent Albums (Official Charts)	24
UK Progressive Albums (Official Charts)	7

== Certifications ==
Region	Certification	Certified units/sales
United Kingdom (BPI)	Silver	60,000^{^}
^{^} Shipments figures based on certification alone.
