= Bill Nelson's Red Noise =

English new wave band (1978–1979)

- Also known as: Red Noise
- Origin: England
- Genres: New wave; synthpop; art rock
- Years active: 1978–1979
- Labels: Harvest, EMI
- Past members: Bill Nelson; Ian Nelson; Andy Clark; Rick Ford; Dave Mattacks; Steve Peer

Bill Nelson's Red Noise, or more simply Red Noise, was Bill Nelson's umbrella term for what effectively became a British new wave band formed by himself (lead vocals, guitar), his brother Ian (saxophone), Andy Clark (keyboards) and Rick Ford (bass). Dave Mattacks and Steve Peer (drums) both had brief stints in the band.

== History ==
Nelson formed Red Noise after dissolving Be-Bop Deluxe, while metamorphosing from blues, progressive and glam rock to more new wave and electronic sounds following the last Be-Bop Deluxe album Drastic Plastic, released early in 1978. EMI's Harvest Records subsidiary, to whom Be-Bop had been contracted, insisted on his name being added – hence Bill Nelson's Red Noise. Clark had also been a member of Be-Bop Deluxe, while Ian Nelson had collaborated on the song (and hit single) "Ships in the Night" from the Sunburst Finish album (1976). Peer was previously in TV Toy, only joining the band for touring purposes after the album had been recorded (he can be heard on a number of Red Noise live and Bill Nelson-credited B-side studio tracks plus the one Red Noise-credited track on Nelson's later Quit Dreaming And Get on the Beam). In the studio, Nelson recorded most of the drum parts himself, hiring former Fairport Convention drummer Dave Mattacks for more complex tracks.

Red Noise released only one album, Sound-on-Sound, plus two singles, "Furniture Music" and "Revolt into Style", in February and April 1979. After that, Bill Nelson continued as a solo artist, with Ian frequently collaborating on his brother's recordings throughout the eighties. Clark would later appear, among other places, on "Ashes to Ashes" and other tracks on David Bowie's Scary Monsters (1980), and "Big Time" and "Don't Give Up" on Peter Gabriel's So (1986). Rick Ford played with Hazel O'Connor and Joe Jackson and now composes soundtrack music for the entertainment industry in California, while Steve Peer returned to work with TV Toy. In the early '80's he formed Custom Made Country, a cow-punk band that hailed from the easternmost town in the US, Lubec, Maine. While in Maine he started Reversing Recordings, a label that features Down East musicians and most anyone else who wants to align with the Vacationland movement. He co-wrote and played drums on two Puzzle Monkey albums, and continues to tour and record with Trisha Mason, The Larks and Doug Hoyt and The Crown Vics.

Red Noise is also considered by some Be-Bop fans as a Be-Bop Deluxe continuation because of Sound-on-Sound's similarity to the emerging electronic character of Be-Bop's final studio album, Drastic Plastic, released the previous year. An interview with Bill Nelson in 1979 hints that several of the songs in Sound-on-Sound were written during his Be-Bop Deluxe days and might have been included in any Be-Bop album subsequent to Drastic Plastic had that band remained together. However, Nelson also makes clear that he regarded Red Noise as an escape from Be-Bop Deluxe rather than its continuation: "Drastic Plastic was the last-ditch attempt to get the band to change a bit but it was difficult for people to accept." Touring England to promote the album, Red Noise performed a Be-Bop song from Drastic Plastic, "Possession."

In a 1984 interview, Nelson revealed that he had recorded a second Red Noise album immediately after Sound-on-Sound but that his record company Harvest Records didn't like it: "EMI wouldn't release it, and it sat on the shelf." Nelson's manager eventually purchased some of the unreleased songs back from EMI so that Nelson could release them as a solo artist under his own label, Cocteau Records. One of these was "Do You Dream in Colour", which received generous radio airplay and press coverage for its original music video. This track and one on the B-side featured all vocals and instruments by Nelson himself apart from sax by Ian Nelson. Two other tracks, "Ideal Homes" and "Instantly Yours", featured the Nelson/Nelson/Ford/Clark/Peer line-up. This release attracted the attention of Phonogram, who secured the remaining tracks for Cocteau to release the full album, Quit Dreaming And Get on the Beam, credited simply to Bill Nelson, on their subsidiary label Mercury Records in 1981. Red Noise had not been originally intended as a band so much as a name under which Nelson could bring in musicians as required without being tied down to a fixed band line-up. However, the commercial pressures of the music business meant that it didn't work out that way. Where only one track on Quit Dreaming was credited to Red Noise, it clearly referred to the band: "Disposable" featured the Bill Nelson/Ford/Clark/Peer line-up. Many other tracks featured both Bill and Ian Nelson.

The Sound-on-Sound album title inspired the publishers of Sound on Sound to name their magazine after it.

Harvest's 2012 CD reissue of Sound-on-Sound contained not only tracks from single B-sides previously unreleased on that format, but also a BBC Radio 1 Friday Rock Show session from 17 February 1979 previously unreleased on any format.

== Discography ==
=== Albums ===
- Sound-on-Sound (February 1979) Harvest

=== Singles ===
- "Furniture Music" / "Wonder Toys That Last for Ever", "Acquitted by Mirrors" (February 1979), Harvest
- "Revolt into Style" / "Out of Touch" (recorded live at Leicester De Montfort Hall) (April 1979), Harvest
- "Revolt into Style", "Furniture Music" / "Stay Young", "Out of Touch" (both recorded live at Leicester De Montfort Hall, 12") (April 1979), Harvest

=== Miscellaneous tracks ===
- "Ideal Homes", "Instantly Yours" on B-side of single "Do You Dream in Colour" (1980) Bill Nelson these two tracks feature the Nelson/Nelson/Ford/Clark/Peer line-up, Cocteau
- "Ideal Homes", "Instantly Yours" (same recordings as above) on The Two-Fold Aspect of Everything (1984) [Bill Nelson] 2-LP set of A- and B-sides previously unavailable on LP, Cocteau
- "Disposable" credited to Red Noise on album Quit Dreaming and Get on the Beam (1981) [Bill Nelson], Mercury

=== Compilation albums ===
- Bop to the Red Noise (1986) Be-Bop Deluxe mixture of BBD and RN material
- The Practice of Everyday Life (2011) [Bill Nelson] 8-CD, 40-year career retrospective of BBD, RN and BN solo material, Esoteric Recordings

=== Compilation singles ===
- Permanent Flame (The Beginners Guide to Bill Nelson) (1983) [Bill Nelson] 5-disc set of previously released BBD, RN and BN solo material, Cocteau
