= Ian Nelson (musician) =

English musician (1956–2006)

- Born: Ian Walter Nelson; 23 April 1956
- Origin: Wakefield, England
- Died: 23 April 2006 (aged 50)
- Genres: Progressive rock, art rock, new wave, synthpop
- Occupation: Musician
- Instruments: Saxophone, keyboards
- Years active: 1975–2006

Ian Walter Nelson (23 April 1956, Wakefield, Yorkshire, England – 23 April 2006) was an English new wave musician, and younger brother of Be-Bop Deluxe singer and guitarist Bill Nelson, whom he accompanied in different musical projects. He played mainly the saxophone.

== Biography ==
He was more than seven years younger than his brother Bill, who was present at the time of his birth, on 23 April 1956. His father, Walter, who was a saxophonist, taught him to play saxophone, which would later be Ian's principal instrument.

His first participation was on the Be-Bop Deluxe song "Ships in the Night" from the Sunburst Finish album (1976). When this band split up, Bill, alongside keyboardist Andy Clark, reunited with Ian on saxophone, and formed Red Noise, a synthpop band which lasted briefly and was a continuation of Be-Bop Deluxe.

After Red Noise split up, Ian Nelson spent some time collaborating in his brother Bill's solo career. In 1982, he joined Fiat Lux; during his three years with the band they released a number of singles, and had two minor UK hits, "Secrets" and "Blue Emotion". Fiat Lux gigged England and Europe until they broke up in 1985.

He reappeared in the early 1990s as member of Bolt From The Blue, and from 2002 to 2006 was in Bill Nelson and the Lost Satellites and The 3D's. He was also a member of the line-up of a failed reformation of Be-Bop Deluxe in 1990.

He also worked with Richard Jobson, Level 42, The Sound, Nik Kershaw and Howard Jones among others.

Nelson died in his sleep, and was later found on his 50th birthday, on 23 April 2006, by his wife Diane.
