= John Leckie =

British record producer (born 1949)

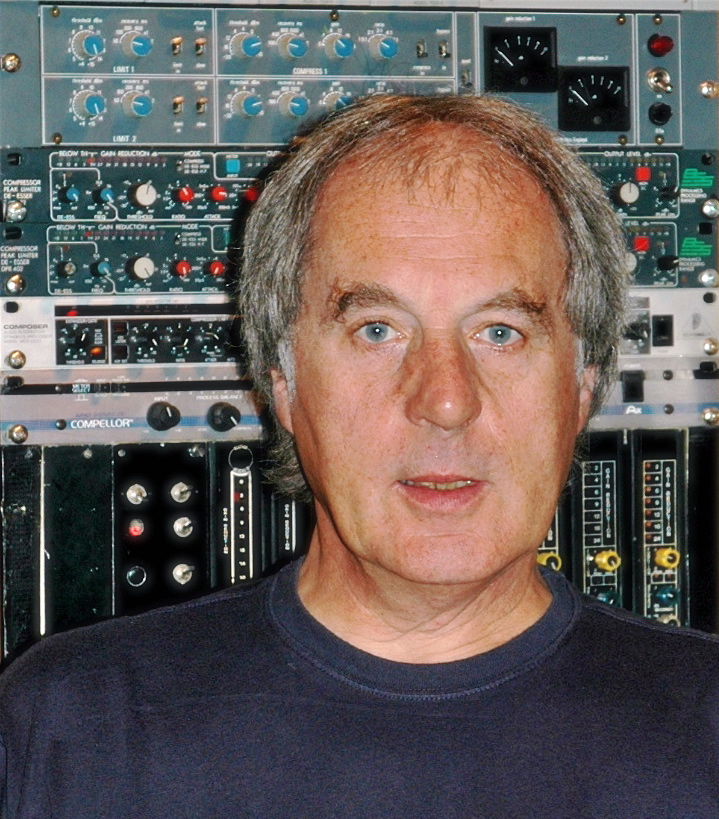
- Leckie in 2006

Background information
- Born: John William Leckie; 23 October 1949 (age 76); Paddington, London, England
- Genres: Rock; pop
- Occupation: Record producer
- Years active: 1970–present

John William Leckie (born 23 October 1949) is an English record producer and recording engineer. His credits include Magazine's Real Life (1978); XTC's White Music (1978); Dukes of Stratosphear's 25 O'Clock and the Fall's This Nation's Saving Grace (both 1985); the Stone Roses' The Stone Roses (1989); the Verve's A Storm in Heaven (1993); Radiohead's The Bends (1995); Cast's All Change (1995); Kula Shaker's K (1996); Muse's Showbiz (1999) and Origin of Symmetry (2001); and the Levellers' We the Collective (2018).

== Early life ==
Born in Paddington, London, Leckie was educated at the Quintin School, a grammar school in North West London, then Ravensbourne College of Art and Design in Bromley. After leaving school, he worked for United Motion Pictures as an audio assistant.

== Career ==
Leckie began work at Abbey Road Studios on 15 February 1970 as a tape operator, later graduating to balance engineer and record producer. During his early career he worked as a tape operator with artists such as George Harrison (All Things Must Pass), John Lennon (John Lennon/Plastic Ono Band) and Syd Barrett (Barrett). He moved up to the desk to be balance engineer for Pink Floyd (Meddle and Wish You Were Here), for Mott the Hoople's album Mott and Paul McCartney and Wings' Red Rose Speedway and the single "Hi, Hi, Hi". Other engineering sessions at Abbey Road at this time were with Roy Harper, Soft Machine, Sammy Hagar, Jack Rieley's Western Justice album and the last recordings with Syd Barrett.

His first jobs as producer, in 1976, were Be-Bop Deluxe's third album, Sunburst Finish, and Doctors of Madness' Figments of Emancipation. His collaboration with Be-Bop Deluxe continued with Modern Music, Live! In the Air Age and Drastic Plastic. In 1977 Leckie produced the Adverts' Crossing the Red Sea with the Adverts and Magazine's Real Life.

Leckie left Abbey Road in 1978 and produced albums for Simple Minds (Life in a Day, Real to Real Cacophony and Empires and Dance). For Be-Bop Deluxe founder Bill Nelson, he produced the Red Noise album Sound-on-Sound and Nelson's subsequent solo album Quit Dreaming and Get on the Beam (the latter unreleased until 1981). Leckie recorded the debut single, "Public Image", for Public Image Ltd and produced the Human League's Holiday 80 EP. Leckie's work with XTC included producing their debut "3D" single and EP, and first two studio albums, White Music and Go 2. In 1981 he worked with Irish band the Atrix on their single "Procession". Later he went on to produce 25 O'Clock and Psonic Psunspot, which XTC issued under the pseudonym the Dukes of Stratosphear in the mid-1980s. In the mid 80s he also produced three consecutive albums by the Fall: The Wonderful and Frightening World Of... (1984), This Nation's Saving Grace (1985), and Bend Sinister (1986).

In 1989 Leckie produced the Stone Roses' debut album, The Stone Roses. It was voted the best album of all time on a music poll taken by BBC Radio 6 Music and features as Number 1 on Observer's June 2004 "100 Greatest British Albums". Some months later he produced and mixed their single "Fools Gold", which reached no. 8 in the UK singles chart. In early 1990, Leckie also produced and mixed the single "One Love" which charted at no. 4 in the UK. Leckie also worked on the Stone Roses' 1994 album Second Coming. In 1995, Leckie produced All Change by the Liverpool band Cast, which became Polydor Records' highest-selling debut album.

Leckie produced and engineered Radiohead's second album, The Bends (1995), which has been named one of the greatest albums by publications including All Time Top 1000 Albums, 1001 Albums You Must Hear Before You Die and Rolling Stone's lists of the "500 Greatest Albums of All Time". Radiohead praised Leckie for demystifying the studio environment. The guitarist Jonny Greenwood said: "He didn't treat us like he had some kind of witchcraft that only he understands. There's no mystery to it, which is so refreshing." Nigel Godrich, who produced Radiohead's later albums, worked on The Bends as an engineer. He named Leckie as one of the producers who had taught him his craft, whom he had "watched directly and emulated".

Leckie's next projects were the first two albums by Muse, Showbiz (1999) and Origin of Symmetry (2001). Muse drew comparisons to Radiohead, which Leckie dismissed, saying: "In the late 90s, any British band that sang passionately and played guitar was going to get compared to Radiohead." He said he had been invited to produce several "Radiohead copycats" after The Bends, and chose Muse because he had "intentionally looked for something different". When Muse won UK Single of the Year at the 2010 Music Producers Guild Awards, the songwriter, Matt Bellamy, thanked Leckie for "teaching us how to produce".

== Awards ==
- 1996 — Music Week Award for Best Producer
- 1996 — Q Award for Best Producer
- 1997 — Brit Award for Best Producer
- 2001 — Music Managers Forum for Best Producer
- 2011 — Music Producers Guild for UK Album of Year by the Coral
- 2011 — BASCA Gold Badge Award
