= Apache Drop Out =

Single by Edgar Broughton Band

from the album Sing Brother Sing
- B-side: "Freedom"
- Released: 1970
- Genre: Rock
- Label: Harvest
- Songwriter(s): Jerry Lordan, Don Van Vliet, Herb Bermann
- Producer(s): Peter Jenner

Edgar Broughton Band singles chronology
"Out Demons Out" (1970)	"Apache Drop Out" (1970)	"Up Yours!" (1970)

"Apache Drop Out" is a song and single written by Jerry Lordan, Don Van Vliet and Herb Bermann, performed by the Edgar Broughton Band and released in 1970.

Of the Edgar Broughton Band's two hit singles in the UK this was their second and biggest. It made 33 on the UK Singles Charts in 1970 staying in the charts for 5 weeks.

== Background ==
1970 was the year the Edgar Broughton Band was tipped for success. Bad management of the group prevented this and they had only two hit singles, neither of which broke into the top 30. The song combines the instrumental, Apache by the Shadows and Dropout Boogie by Captain Beefheart.
