= Music from Macbeth =

1972 music album by Third Ear Band

Film score by Third Ear Band
- Released: 1972
- Recorded: 1971
- Studio: Air Studios, London
- Genre: Film score; progressive folk; Medieval classical music
- Length: 43:42
- Label: Harvest Records (original release); BGO Records (1990 reissue); Blueprint Records (reissue)
- Producer: Andrew King, Third Ear Band

Third Ear Band chronology
Abelard and Heloise (1970)	Music from Macbeth (1972)	Prophecies (1972)

Music from Macbeth is a 1972 album by the Third Ear Band. It consists of the soundtrack from Roman Polanski's 1971 film Macbeth, an adaptation of Shakespeare's The Tragedy of Macbeth.

== Composition ==
The band composed original music for the film, by adding electronic music to hand drums, woodwinds and strings. Elements of music in India and the Middle East and jazz were also incorporated into the score.

While the score has some Middle Ages influence, this is not found in the scenes where Duncan is assassinated and Macbeth is killed. Polanski and the band used aleatoric music for these scenes, to communicate chaos.

== Track listing ==
1. "Overture" – 4:20
2. "The Beach" – 1:54
3. "Lady Macbeth" – 1:47
4. "Inverness: Macbeth's Return/The Preparation/Fanfare/Duncan's Arrival" – 5:00
5. "The Banquet" – 1:21
6. "Dagger and Death" – 2:49
7. "At the Well/The Princes's Escape/Coronation/Come Sealing Night" – 3:03
8. "Court Dance" – 2:28
9. "Fleance" – 4:02
10. "Grooms' Dance" – 4:21
11. "Bear Baiting" – 1:10
12. "Ambush/Banquo's Ghost" – 2:27
13. "Going to Bed/Blind Man's Buff/Requiescant/Sere and Yellow Leaf" – 3:04
14. "The Cauldron" – 2:39
15. "Prophesies" – 1:53
16. "Wicca Way" – 1:24

(All compositions by Bridges, Sweeney, Minns, and Buckmaster.)

== Personnel ==
- Paul Minns — oboe and recorder
- Glen Sweeney — drums
- Paul Buckmaster — cello and bass guitar
- Simon House — violin and VCS3
- Denim Bridges — guitars

The album also features vocals by a 12-year-old Keith Chegwin.

The cover was originally painted by Roger Dean.
