= Superchip =

Superchip may refer to:

- Superchip: The Final Silicon Solution?, a 1982 album by the Edgar Broughton Band
- Superchips, a former company specialized on engine tuning and bearing that name from 1991 to 2020
- Grace Superchip, a semiconductor carrier board design type from Nvidia
