= Alchemy (Third Ear Band album) =

Studio album by Third Ear Band
- Released: July 1969 (UK)
- Length: 50:07
- Label: Harvest
- Producer: Peter Jenner

Third Ear Band chronology
Alchemy (1969)	Third Ear Band (1970)

Professional ratings
Review scores
Source	Rating
AllMusic	4/5 stars

Alchemy is an album released in 1969 by the Third Ear Band.

== Track listing ==
All compositions by Coff, Minns and Sweeney, except "Lark Rise" (Tomlin)

1. "Mosaic" – 6:31
2. "Ghetto Raga" – 10:32
3. "Druid One" – 3:49
4. "Stone Circle" – 3:28
5. "Egyptian Book of the Dead" – 8:55
6. "Area Three" – 8:33
7. "Dragon Lines" – 5:33
8. "Lark Rise" – 2:46

== Personnel ==
- Paul Minns – oboe, recorder
- Mel Davis – cello, pipe
- Glen Sweeney – chimes, drums, tabla, wind chimes, hand drums
- Richard Coff – violin, viola

with:

- Dave Tomlin – violin on "Lark Rise"
- John Peel – harmonica, Jew's harp on "Area Three"

Technical

- Ken Scott, Peter Mew – engineer
- Dave Loxley – design, artwork
- Ray Stevenson – photography
