= Third Ear =

Third Ear may refer to:

== Music ==
- Third Ear Band, a British band
  - Third Ear Band (album), 1970 eponymous album
- Third Ear, an Israeli record store that runs the Earsay record label

== Language and listening ==
- Third ear, a concept formulated by psychoanalyst Theodor Reik, explained in his book Listening with the Third Ear: The Inner Experience of a Psychoanalyst

== Other uses ==
- Third Ear, a cell-cultivated ear surgically attached to the left arm of performance artist Stelarc
