= Out Demons Out =

Single by Edgar Broughton Band

from the album Sing Brother Sing
- B-side: "Momma's Reward (Keep Them Freaks A-Rollin')"
- Released: 1970
- Genre: Rock
- Label: Harvest
- Songwriters: Arthur Grant, Edgar Broughton, Steve Broughton
- Producer: Peter Jenner

Edgar Broughton Band singles chronology
"Out Demons Out" (1970)	"Apache Dropout" (1970)

"Out Demons Out" is a song and single written by Arthur Grant, Edgar Broughton and Steve Broughton, performed by the Edgar Broughton Band and released in 1970.

Of the Edgar Broughton Band's two hit singles in the UK this was their first. It reached No. 39 on the UK Singles Chart in 1970 remaining in the chart for five weeks.

== Background ==
1970 was the year the Edgar Broughton Band was tipped for success. Bad management of the group prevented this and they had only two hit singles, neither of which broke into the top 30. The first, "Out Demons Out", has been described as an "audience sing-along, a chant exorcising the evils of the day". When performed live, the song and its chants often had a rousing effects on audiences.
