= CCFP =

CCFP can refer to:

- A certification granted by the College of Family Physicians of Canada
- Creative Community for Peace, a pro-Israel advocacy group
