= Giramonti =

Giramonti is a surname. Notable people with the surname include:

- Adriana Giramonti (1929–2016), Italian-American chef
- Piero Giramonti (fl. 1989–2015), American music business executive
