= Broken China =

Studio album by Richard Wright
- Released: 7 October 1996
- Recorded: Studio Harmonie, France; Whitfield Street Studios, London; RAK Studios and The Astoria
- Genres: Progressive rock; psychedelic rock; ambient
- Length: 59:24
- Labels: EMI (UK); Guardian (US)
- Producers: Richard Wright; Anthony Moore; Laurie Latham (co-producer)

Richard Wright chronology
| Identity (1984) | Broken China (1996) |

Professional ratings
Review scores
| Source | Rating |
|---|---|
| AllMusic | 4/5 stars |

Broken China is the second solo studio album by Pink Floyd keyboardist Richard Wright (credited on the cover as Rick), released on 7 October 1996. It was co-produced and co-written by Anthony Moore, who had worked on the previous two Pink Floyd albums, A Momentary Lapse of Reason (1987) and The Division Bell (1994).

== Overview ==
The album is a four-part concept album based on Wright's then-wife Mildred's battle with depression. "Reaching for the Rail" and "Breakthrough" feature Sinéad O'Connor on lead vocals, with Wright singing the remainder. The album was recorded in Wright's studio in France. Broken China was Wright's first solo record since 1978's Wet Dream and the last before his death in September of 2008.

Pink Floyd guitarist David Gilmour recorded a performance for "Breakthrough", but the approach to the song was changed later on and Gilmour's performance was not used on the finished release. On the DVD David Gilmour in Concert, a guest appearance is made by Wright, who sings "Breakthrough" accompanied by Gilmour and his band.

The packaging has artwork by Pink Floyd's regular designer, Storm Thorgerson, and Peter Curzon.

== Track listing ==
Broken China track listing
| No. | Title | Writer(s) | Length |
|---|---|---|---|
| 1. | "Breaking Water" | Richard Wright, Anthony Moore | 2:27 |
| 2. | "Night of a Thousand Furry Toys" | Wright, Moore | 4:23 |
| 3. | "Hidden Fear" | Wright, Gerry Gordon | 3:28 |
| 4. | "Runaway" | Moore | 4:00 |
| 5. | "Unfair Ground" | Wright | 2:22 |
| 6. | "Satellite" | Wright | 4:05 |
| 7. | "Woman of Custom" | Moore | 3:44 |
| 8. | "Interlude" | Wright | 1:15 |
| 9. | "Black Cloud" | Wright | 3:20 |
| 10. | "Far from the Harbour Wall" | Wright, Moore | 6:08 |
| 11. | "Drowning" | Wright | 1:38 |
| 12. | "Reaching for the Rail" | Wright, Moore | 6:30 |
| 13. | "Blue Room in Venice" | Wright, Gordon | 2:47 |
| 14. | "Sweet July" | Wright | 4:14 |
| 15. | "Along the Shoreline" | Wright, Moore | 4:36 |
| 16. | "Breakthrough" | Wright, Moore | 4:19 |

== Personnel ==
=== Musicians ===
- Richard Wright – keyboards, vocals, programming
- Anthony Moore – lyrics, computer programming and arrangements, 'telephone vocal' (2)
- Sinéad O'Connor – lead vocals (12, 16)
- Tim Renwick – guitars
- Dominic Miller – guitars
- Steven Bolton – guitars
- Pino Palladino – bass guitar
- Manu Katché – drums, percussion
- Sian Bell – cello
- Kate St. John – oboe, cor anglais
- Maz Palladino – backing vocals

=== Design ===
- Storm Thorgerson, Peter Curzon – sleeve design
- Tony May – photography
- Jason Reddy – computer
- Julien Mils, Finlay Cowan – artwork

== Charts ==
Chart performance for Broken China
| Chart (1996) | Peak position |
|---|---|
| Norwegian Albums (VG-lista) | 24 |
| Swedish Albums (Sverigetopplistan) | 52 |
| Swiss Albums (Schweizer Hitparade) | 39 |
