= Malcolm Dome =

English music journalist (1955–2021)

- Born: 1955; London, England
- Died: 29 October 2021 (aged 66)
- Occupations: Music journalist; author

Malcolm Dome (1955 – 29 October 2021) was an English music journalist.

Dome wrote about rock and heavy metal from 1979. In addition to writing books, he was a journalist for Record Mirror, Kerrang!, Metal Hammer and Classic Rock among others. Dome co-founded the UK's first rock radio station, TotalRock, along with Friday Rock Show DJ Tommy Vance and producer Tony Wilson. After 17 years with the station, Dome left in March 2014 to join Team Rock full-time.

Dome often is credited wrongly with the first use of the term "thrash metal", in an article on page 8 of issue number 62 of Kerrang! magazine, published on 23 February 1984; he was referring to the Anthrax song "Metal Thrashing Mad". The term thrash metal though is older, since someone can find it in both Metal Forces 1 and Metal Mania 13, both released in late 1983. Prior to this, Metallica's frontman James Hetfield referred to his band's sound as "power metal".

Dome was a contributor to the DVDs Queen Under Review 1973-1980, Queen Under Review 1980-1991 and Music Milestones: Genesis's Duke as well as Uriah Heep retrospective DVDs. He also provided sleeve notes for the Nuclear Burn 4–CD remaster set of jazz fusion band Brand X's work between 1976 and 1980.

It was announced on 1 November 2021 that Dome had died, aged 66.

== Selected books ==
- Dome, Malcolm and Harrigan, Brian. The bible of Heavy Metal: Encyclopaedia Metallica. Omnibus Press, 1981. ISBN 0-86001-928-4.
- Dome, Malcolm. AC/DC. Proteus Pub Co, 1982. ISBN 0-86276-011-9.
- Dome, Malcolm. Thrash Metal. Omnibus Press, 1990. ISBN 0-7119-1790-6.
- Dome, Malcolm. Aerosmith: Life in the Fast Lane. Castle Communications, 1994. ISBN 1-898141-75-4.
- Dome, Malcolm and Burrows, Brian (illustrator). Van Halen: Excess All Areas. Sanctuary Publishing, 1994. ISBN 1-898141-85-1.
- Dome, Malcolm and Wall, Mick. The Complete Guide to the Music of Metallica. Omnibus Press, 1995. ISBN 0-7119-4902-6.
- Dome, Malcolm and Wall, Mick. Bon Jovi: All Night Long". Omnibus Press, 1995. ISBN 0-7119-4894-1.
- Dome, Malcolm and Simmons, Sylvie. Mötley Crüe. Sanctuary Publishing, 1995. ISBN 1-898141-95-9.
- Dome, Malcolm and Wall, Mick. The Making of "Metallica". Collector's Guide Publishing, 1996. ISBN 1-896522-34-3.
- Dome, Malcolm and Berman, Jon. Everton Greats. Mainstream Publishing, 2003. ISBN 1-84018-805-7.
- Dome, Malcolm and Fogg, Rod. Eddie Van Halen: Know the Man, Play the Music. Backbeat, 2005. ISBN 0-87930-838-9.
- Dome, Malcolm and Wall, Mick. Metallica": Complete Guide to Their Music. Omnibus Press, 2005. ISBN 1-84449-981-2.
- Dome, Malcolm and Wall, Mick. Metallica: The Music and the Mayhem. Omnibus Press. 2011. ISBN 1-84938-662-5.
- Dome, Malcolm and Brown, Arthur. The Crazy Worlds of Arthur Brown: Marvellous Moments of Momentary Marvel. Cherry Red Books. 2014. ISBN 1-90144-766-9.
