= Wasa Wasa =

Studio album by Edgar Broughton Band
- Released: July 1969
- Recorded: 1969 (bonus tracks recorded late 1965/1966)
- Studios: EMI Studios, Abbey Road, London
- Genres: Acid rock, blues rock, psychedelic rock, hard rock, proto-punk
- Length: 45:17 LP; 68:36 CD Release
- Label: Harvest
- Producer: Peter Jenner

Edgar Broughton Band chronology
Wasa Wasa (1969)	Sing Brother Sing (1970)

Singles from Wasa Wasa
- 1. "Evil" Released: 6 June 1969 (Europe only)

Professional ratings
Review scores
Source	Rating
Allmusic	4/5 stars

Wasa Wasa is the debut album by the English psychedelic rock band Edgar Broughton Band. The album was originally released as "Harvest SHVL 757" in July 1969 and was produced by Peter Jenner.

== Releases ==
The 2004 CD reissue contained five previously unreleased bonus tracks, four of them being demos recorded by the band when they were a blues outfit called "The Edgar Broughton Blues Band". These tracks feature guitarist Victor Unitt, who left the band when they started to go into psychedelic rock, stating the members of the band to be "sell-outs". The last bonus track was a jamming session which was recorded on 21 January 1969, which was discovered when remastering the album.

== Track listing ==
1. "Death of an Electric Citizen" (Arthur Grant, Robert Edgar Broughton, Steve Broughton) – 6:09
2. "American Boy Soldier" (Grant, R.E. Broughton, S. Broughton) – 4:22
3. "Why Can't Somebody Love Me?" (Grant, R.E. Broughton, S. Broughton) – 5:05
4. "Neptune" (S. Broughton) – 4:20
5. "Evil" (R.E. Broughton) – 2:36
6. "Crying" (R.E. Broughton) – 5:14
7. "Love in the Rain" (R.E. Broughton) – 3:46
8. "Dawn Crept Away" (R.E. Broughton, S. Broughton)– 14:07

2004 CD reissue bonus tracks

1. "Messin' with the Kid" (Kelvin London) – 2:50
2. "Waterloo Man" (R. E. Broughton) – 4:11
3. "Jacqueline" (Big Bill Broonzy) – 3:41
4. "Tellin' Everybody" (R. E. Broughton) – 2:28
5. "Untitled Freak Out" (Grant, R.E. Broughton, S. Broughton) – 9:47

== Personnel ==
=== Edgar Broughton Band ===
- Edgar Broughton – vocals, guitar
- Arthur Grant – bass, vocals
- Steve Broughton – drums

=== Additional musician ===
- Victor Unitt – guitar (bonus tracks 1–4)

=== Technical ===
- Peter Jenner – producer
- Peter Bown – engineer
- Peter Mew – engineer
- Jim Epps – sleeve design
- John Hopkins – liner notes
- Dick Imrie – photography
