= Abelard and Heloise (album) =

Soundtrack album by Third Ear Band
- Released: 1970
- Recorded: 2, 3 July 1970; Munich
- Length: 36:54
- Label: Harvest

Third Ear Band chronology
Third Ear Band (1970)	Abelard and Heloise (1970)	Music from Macbeth (1972)

Abelard and Heloise is a soundtrack album released in 1970 by the Third Ear Band. It was re-released on CD in 1998 by Blueprint.

== Track listing ==
All tracks were released without titles.

1. Untitled – 13:42
2. Untitled – 4:39
3. Untitled – 3:21
4. Untitled – 3:18
5. Untitled – 4:12
6. Untitled – 7:42

== Personnel ==
- Glenn Sweeney — drums
- Paul Minns — oboe
- Richard Coff — violin, viola
- Ursula Smith — cello
