= Edgar Broughton Band (album) =

Studio album by Edgar Broughton Band
- Released: May 1971
- Recorded: July 1970–February 1971
- Studio: Abbey Road Studios, London
- Genre: Psychedelic rock, blues rock, hard rock, folk rock
- Length: 51:13
- Label: Harvest; Repertoire (1994 German CD reissue)
- Producer: Peter Jenner

Edgar Broughton Band chronology
Sing Brother Sing (1970)	Edgar Broughton Band (1971)	In Side Out (1972)

Professional ratings
Review scores
Source	Rating
Allmusic	3.5/5 stars

Edgar Broughton Band is the self-titled third album by the Edgar Broughton Band. Released in 1971, the album is known amongst fans as "The Meat Album", as the album cover features meat on hangers in a warehouse; a human can also be seen hanging amongst the meat. The 2004 CD reissue features three bonus tracks. Several outside musicians were used on this album including Mike Oldfield and Roy Harper.

== Track listing ==
1. "Evening Over Rooftops" (Robert Edgar Broughton, Victor Unitt) – 5:00
2. "The Birth" (R. E. Broughton) – 3:21
3. "Piece of My Own" (R. E. Broughton) – 2:46
4. "Poppy" (R. E. Broughton) – 2:14
5. "Don't Even Know Which Day It Is" (R. E. Broughton, Steve Broughton, Victor Unitt) – 4:20
6. "House of Turnabout" (R. E. Broughton) – 3:08
7. "Madhatter" (R. E. Broughton, S. Broughton, Unitt) – 6:14
8. "Getting Hard/What Is a Woman For?" (R. E. Broughton, S. Broughton, Arthur Grant, Unitt) – 7:29
9. "Thinking of You" (S. Broughton, Unitt) – 2:04
10. "For Doctor Spock Parts 1 & 2" (R. E. Broughton, S. Broughton, Grant, Unitt) – 3:50

2004 CD reissue bonus tracks

1. "Hotel Room" (R. E. Broughton) – 4:04 (A-side of "Harvest HAR 5040")
2. "Call Me a Liar" (R. E. Broughton) – 4:27 (B-side of "Harvest HAR 5040")
3. "Bring It on Home" (Willie Dixon) – 3:27 (Previously unreleased)

== Personnel ==
- Edgar Broughton – vocals, guitar
- Arthur Grant – bass guitar, vocals
- Steve Broughton – drums, vocals
- Victor Unitt – guitar, harmonica, piano, organ, vocals

Additional musicians

- The Ladybirds – vocals (track 1)
- Johnny van Derek – violin (track 3)
- P. Harold Fatt – vocals (track 5)
- David Bedford – piano (track 8)
- Mike Oldfield – mandolin (track 9)
- Roy Harper – backing vocals (CD track 12)

Technical

- Peter Jenner – producer
- Peter Mew – engineer
- David Bedford – arranger (cellos & brass)
- Hipgnosis − cover photography
- Adrian Boot, Nigel Leaman − photography
