= Bandages (album) =

Studio album by Edgar Broughton Band
- Released: July 1976
- Recorded: June–August 1975
- Studio: Arne Bendiksen Studios, Vålerenga, Oslo
- Genre: Psychedelic rock
- Length: 42:17
- Label: NEMS Records
- Producer: Edgar Broughton Band

Edgar Broughton Band chronology
Oora (1973)	Bandages (1976)	Parlez-Vous English? (1979)

Bandages is the sixth studio album by psychedelic rock group, the Edgar Broughton Band. This was the first album to be made after the band's departure from Harvest Records. It was originally released as "NEMS NEL 6006" in 1976. The album was reissued in 2006.

== Track listing ==
All tracks composed by Edgar Broughton; except where indicated
Side one

1. "Get a Rise" – 4:59
2. "Speak Down the Wires" – 3:13
3. "John Wayne" – 3:10
4. "The Whale" – 5:34
5. "Germany" – 4:33
6. "Love Gang" (Edgar Broughton, Steve Broughton) – 2:54

Side two

7. "One to Seven" – 5:07
8. "Lady Life" – 3:06
9. "Signal Injector" – 4:02
10. "Frühling Flowers (For Claudia)" (Steve Broughton) – 5:02
11. "I Want to Lie" (Edgar Broughton, Arthur Grant) – 4:36

== Personnel ==
Adapted from AllMusic.

Edgar Broughton Band

- Edgar Broughton − lead vocals, guitar, bass, banjo, harmonica, acoustic guitars, mandolin, Moog
- Arthur Grant − vocals, bass, acoustic guitars, organ, bowed bass guitar, bass Moog
- Steve Broughton − vocals, drums, piano, tambourine, bass, acoustic guitar, harpsichord, bells, maracas, timbales, jawbone, marimba
- "Creepy" John Thomas − vocals, guitar

Guest musicians

- Lei Aloah Mei − backing vocals
- Pete Knutsen − keyboards
- Mike Oldfield − dulcimer, harp, ARP, steel guitar
- Stuart "Digger" Davies − rhythm guitar on "John Wayne"

Production

- Bjørn Lillehagen − engineer
- Paschal Byrne − digital remastering
- Hugh Gilmour − package design
- Mark Powell − liner notes, project coordinator
