= Identity (Zee album) =

Studio album by Zee
- Released: 9 April 1984
- Recorded: September 1983
- Studios: Rectory (Therfield, Hertfordshire)
- Genres: New wave; synth-pop
- Length: 41:46
- Labels: Harvest; EMI
- Producers: Richard Wright; Dave Harris; Tim Palmer

Richard Wright chronology
Wet Dream (1978)	Identity (1984)	Broken China (1996)

Alternative cover
- Identity 2019 cover

Professional ratings
Review scores
Source	Rating
Jerk Music Critic	2/5 stars

Identity is the debut and sole studio album by Zee, a short-lived side project of Pink Floyd's keyboardist and songwriter Rick Wright, a duo partnership consisting of Wright and Dave Harris of new wave band Fashion, released on 9 April 1984 by Harvest and EMI Records. The album was written and produced by Wright and Harris and all the lyrics were penned by Harris.

The album makes heavy use of the Fairlight CMI, a digital synthesiser, music sampler, and digital audio workstation (DAW) popularized in the 1980s. This creates a very electronic sound that persists through every track.

"Confusion" was released as a single with "Eyes of a Gypsy" as the B-side.

The album was reissued with bonus tracks and new cover art in 2019. Despite deceptive packaging suggesting otherwise, all previous CD issues of the album prior to this had been unauthorized and unofficial.

== Track listing ==
All lyrics are written by Dave Harris; all music is composed by Richard Wright and Dave Harris.

Side one
No.	Title	Length
1.	"Confusion"	4:17
2.	"Voices"	6:21
3.	"Private Person"	3:36
4.	"Strange Rhythm"	6:36

Side two
No.	Title	Length
5.	"Cuts Like a Diamond"	5:36
6.	"By Touching"	5:39
7.	"How Do You Do It"	4:45
8.	"Seems We Were Dreaming"	4:57
Total length:		41:46

Cassette bonus track
No.	Title	Length
9.	"Eyes of a Gypsy"	4:13

Identity 2019 Disc 1 bonus tracks
No.	Title	Length
9.	"Confusion (7" Single)"	3:37
10.	"Eyes of a Gypsy (7" Single)"	4:20
11.	"Confusion (12" Single)"	6:24
12.	"Eyes of a Gypsy (12" Single)"	4:14

Identity 2019 Disc 2
No.	Title	Length
1.	"Cuts Like a Diamond"	5:24
2.	"Private Person"	3:28
3.	"Strange Rhythm"	6:14
4.	"Voices"	6:15
5.	"Confusion"	4:41

== Non-album tracks ==
1. "Confusion" (Single Mix) – 3:36
2. "Confusion" (12" Mix) – 6:21
3. "Eyes of a Gypsy" (Dub) (from the "Confusion" 12" UK single) – 4:11

== Personnel ==
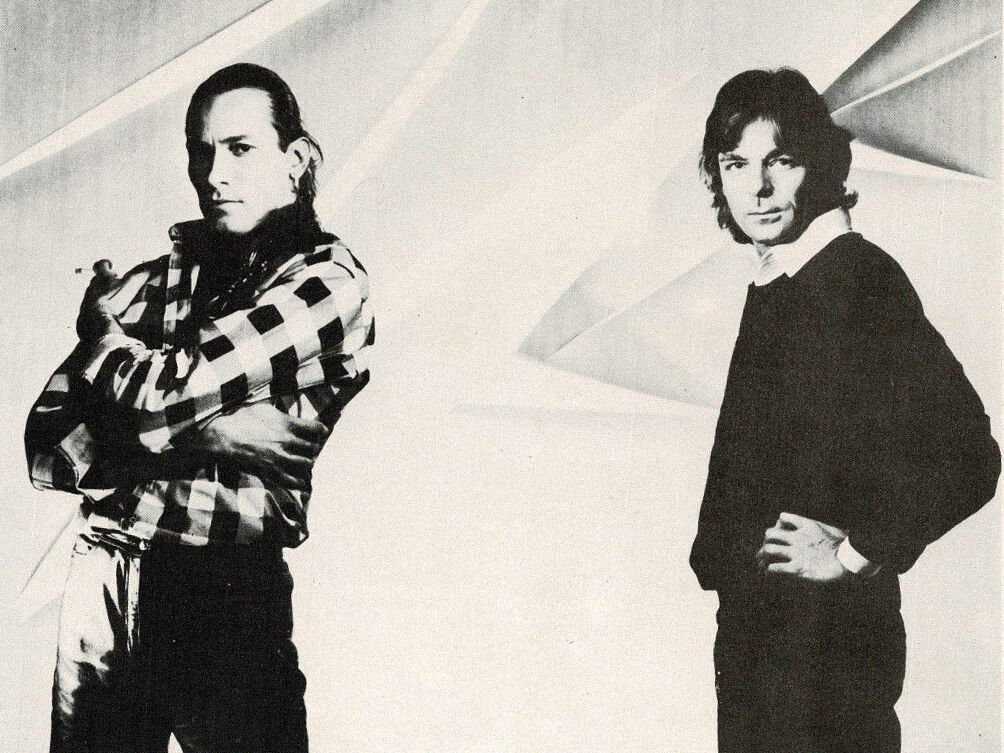
Harris and Wright in 1984

- Richard Wright – keyboards, synthesized percussion, Fairlight CMI, backing vocals
- Dave "Dee" Harris – guitars, keyboards, percussion, Fairlight CMI, lead vocals

=== Production ===
- Produced by Richard Wright and Dave Harris
- Engineered and co-produced by Tim Palmer
- Overdubs and mixdown by Utopia (London)
- Artwork by Dave Harris
- Photography by Paul Cox
