= The Greatest Show on Earth (band) =

British progressive rock band

The Greatest Show on Earth was a British progressive rock band who recorded two albums for EMI's progressive rock arm, Harvest Records, in 1970. They became known for their European hit "Real Cool World", which reached #7 in the Dutch Top 40, as well as for their album covers, designed by the artist group Hipgnosis.

The band had been conceived by Harvest Records in an attempt to create a horn-based rock combo such as Blood Sweat & Tears or Chicago. Band members included Norman Watt-Roy and his older brother Garth Watt-Roy, Ozzie Lane, Mick Deacon, Ian Aitcheson, Tex Philpotts, Dick Hanson, Ron Prudence and Colin Horton-Jennings. Their usual producer was EMI house producer Jonathan Peel, not to be confused with DJ John Peel.

== Discography ==
- 1970: Horizons
- 1970: The Going's Easy
- 1975: The Greatest Show on Earth (compilation of first two albums)
