= Blackhill Enterprises =

Rock music management company

- Industry: Music management
- Founded: 1966
- Defunct: 1981
- Fate: Dissolved
- Headquarters: London, England
- Key people: Peter Jenner; Andrew King; Syd Barrett; Nick Mason; Roger Waters; Richard Wright

Blackhill Enterprises was a rock music management company, founded as a partnership by the four original members of Pink Floyd (Syd Barrett, Nick Mason, Roger Waters and Richard Wright), with Peter Jenner and Andrew King.

Blackhill were the organisers of the first Hyde Park free concerts.

After Syd Barrett left Pink Floyd, the partnership was dissolved, and Jenner and King continued Blackhill to manage Barrett. Following Blackhill's eventual dissolution, both Jenner and King continued to work in music management.

They also managed:

- Marc Bolan (who met his wife, June Child, while she was working as Blackhill's secretary)
- Edgar Broughton Band
- The Clash
- Ian Dury
- Roy Harper
- Alberto Y Lost Trios Paranoias
- Kevin Ayers
- Bridget St John
- The Action (until they became Mighty Baby in January 1969 and parted company with Blackhill Enterprises).
