= Oora =

Studio album by Edgar Broughton Band
- Released: May 1973
- Recorded: June–December 1972
- Studio: Olympic Studios, West London; Morgan Studios, North London; The Manor Studios, Shipton-on-Cherwell, UK
- Genre: Psychedelic rock, Hard rock
- Length: 40:07
- Label: Harvest
- Producer: Edgar Broughton Band

Edgar Broughton Band chronology
In Side Out (1972)	Oora (1973)	Bandages (1976)

Professional ratings
Review scores
Source	Rating
Allmusic	link

Oora is the fifth album by psychedelic rock group, the Edgar Broughton Band, first released in 1973. It was the Broughtons' last album for Harvest Records.

The original vinyl album came in an elaborate package, with a conventional gatefold album jacket enclosed in a transparent vinyl sleeve printed with the group's name and band pictures. The 2004 CD reissue featured one additional track.

== Track listing ==
=== Side one ===
1. "Hurricane Man / Rock 'n' Roller" (R.E. Broughton) - 6:13
2. "Roccococooler" (R.E. Broughton) - 3:09
3. "Eviction" (S. Broughton) - 3:00
4. "Oh You Crazy Boy!" (Victor Unitt) - 2:44
5. "Things on My Mind" (S. Broughton) - 3:39

=== Side two ===
6. "Exhibits from a New Museum / Green Lights" (R.E. Broughton) - 7:54
7. "Face from a Window / Pretty / Hi-Jack Boogie / Slow Down" (R.E. Broughton, S. Broughton, Arthur Grant, Unitt) - 10:29
8. "Capers" (R.E. Broughton, S. Broughton, Grant, Unitt) - 1:37

=== Bonus track on 2004 CD reissue ===
9. "Sweet Fallen Angels" (R.E. Broughton) - 2:51

== Personnel ==
Edgar Broughton Band

- Edgar Broughton – lead vocals, guitar, bass guitar on "Hi-Jack Boogie"
- Arthur Grant – bass guitar, guitar on "Hurricane Man" and "Hi-Jack Boogie"
- Steve Broughton – vocals, drums, percussion, guitars, tubular bells, tambourine
- Victor Unitt – backing vocals, guitars, Spanish guitar on "Exhibits from a New Museum", piano, lead vocals on "Oh You Crazy Boy!"

Guest musicians

- Madeline Bell – backing vocals on "Rock 'n' Roller", "Things On My Mind" and "Face from a Window"
- Doris Troy – backing vocals on "Rock 'n' Roller", "Things On My Mind" and "Face from a Window"
- Lisa Strike – backing vocals on "Rock 'n' Roller", "Things On My Mind" and "Face from a Window"
- Maggie Thomas – backing vocals on "Oh You Crazy Boy!"
- David Bedford – piano on "Green Lights", string and wind arrangements
- Victor Peraino − synthesizer

Technical

- Alan O'Duffy − recording
- Rufus Cartwright − mixing
- Chris Smith − sleeve design concept
- Barney Bubbles − artwork
- Hipgnosis − centre fold photography
