= In Side Out =

Studio album by Edgar Broughton Band
- Released: July 1972
- Recorded: 1972
- Studio: Morgan Studios, London; Olympia Studios
- Genre: Psychedelic rock, Hard rock
- Length: 56:21
- Label: Harvest; Repertoire (1994 German CD reissue)
- Producer: Edgar Broughton Band

Edgar Broughton Band chronology
Edgar Broughton Band (1971)	In Side Out (1972)	Oora (1973)

Professional ratings
Review scores
Source	Rating
Allmusic	link

In Side Out is the fourth album by psychedelic rock group, Edgar Broughton Band. The album was originally released as "Harvest SHTC 252" in July 1972. The 2004 CD reissue features three bonus tracks.

== Track listing ==
1. "Get Out of Bed / There's Nobody There / Side by Side" (Robert Edgar Broughton, Steve Broughton) – 3:42
2. "Sister Angela" (R. E. Broughton) – 0:40
3. "I Got Mad" (R. E. Broughton, Victor Unitt) – 3:45
4. "They Took It Away" (S. Broughton) – 2:27
5. "Homes Fit for Heroes" (R. E. Broughton) – 4:18
6. "Gone Blue" (Arthur Grant, R. E. Broughton) – 3:14
7. "Chilly Morning Mama" (R. E. Broughton) – 4:32
8. "The Rake" (R. E. Broughton) – 2:42
9. "Totin' This Guitar" (R. E. Broughton) – 1:46
10. "Double Agent" (S. Broughton) – 2:53
11. "It's Not You" (R. E. Broughton, S. Broughton, Grant, Unitt) – 11:10
12. "Rock 'n' Roll" (R. E. Broughton, Unitt) – 2:56

=== 2004 CD reissue bonus tracks ===
1. "Someone" (R. E. Broughton) – 3:45 (B-side of "Harvest HAR 5049")
2. "Mr. Crosby" (S. Broughton) – 2:09 (B-side of "Harvest HAR 5049")
3. "Look at the Mayor" – 9:42 (Live at "The Sundown Mile End", previously unreleased)

== Personnel ==
Edgar Broughton Band

- Edgar Broughton – vocals, guitar
- Arthur Grant – bass guitar, vocals
- Steve Broughton – drums, vocals
- Victor Unitt – guitars, vocals

== Production ==
- The Edgar Broughton Band – producers
- Alan O'Duffy – engineer
- Hipgnosis − cover design, photography
