= TotalRock =

- London; England

Programming
- Language: English
- Format: Rock and metal
- Affiliations: Rock Radio Network, Bloodstock Radio

Ownership
- Owner: Independent

History
- First air date: 29 May 2000
- Former frequencies: 1251 kHz in London; Sky Channel 885

Links
- Website: totalrock.com

TotalRock is a radio station based in London, England. The station first started in 1997 as Rock Radio Network (RRN), changing name to TotalRock in 2000. The station broadcasts rock and metal music internationally across the internet.

== History ==
=== Rock Radio Network ===
Set up by radio and rock luminaries Tommy Vance, Tony Wilson, Andy King, David Clouter and Nigel Roberts, RRN started broadcasting in 1997 online from the front room of a DJ's house on Briarfield Avenue, Finchley, known as 'The Skullery'.

=== TotalRock ===
With a move to the function room of The Kings Head in Fulham, TotalRock began broadcasting on 1251AM in London with a Restricted Service Licence on 29 May 2000, with BBC Radio 1 Friday Rock Show creator Tony Wilson, the legendary ‘Voice Of Metal’ DJ Tommy Vance, CEO Boyd Steemson and the metal guru, journalist and author, Malcolm Dome.

The station produced a series of shows for Sanctuary Music's "Metal-Is" website and in early 2001 TotalRock launched free-to-air digital satellite service. Commercial pressures led to TotalRock losing its satellite licence in 2002, however, the station was already streaming all shows worldwide through its website. This later became the station's sole method of output, and it was voted the world's best online metal station in the Online Metal Awards in 2002.

In 2004, Soho's Denmark Place became the home of TotalRock until Crossrail developments forced a move to the parallel Denmark Street in 2010. With high business rates in the centre of the city, TotalRock looked elsewhere and found a home in Shoreditch, East London, in 2012.

=== Bloodstock Radio ===
On Halloween 2012, it was announced that TotalRock would merge with Bloodstock Open Air to become Bloodstock Radio from 1 December.

Shortly afterwards in 2013 came the move to the basement of The Cape of Good Hope in Euston. Under new management, the pub was converted to a rock bar and allowed TotalRock to flourish and broaden the brand with club nights and live acoustic gigs.

=== Return to TotalRock ===
In January 2014, the station reverted to the TotalRock name, however, only months later misfortune struck and the station was forced to vacate its studios due to the landlord returning the lease. Though currently minus a headquarters, the station continues through remote broadcasting.

== Locations ==
- 1997–2000, Finchley, North London

RRN was broadcast from the front living room of rock DJ "Skull"; the location was nicknamed "The Skullery".

- 2000–2004, The Kings Head, Fulham, West London

A pub in South West London, with purpose built studios in the function room upstairs. This venue enabled the TotalFest gigs to be held The first floor area which was the offices of Total Rock, was once where Robert Plant and Jimmy Page used to rehearse.

- 2004–2009, 1 Denmark Place, Soho, Central London

Initially the studio, library and office were located in one practice room on the first floor of Enterprise Studios, using a section of the studio wall from The Kings Head to sound proof the studio. In early 2005, the office relocated to attic space of 1 Denmark Place and allowed for a second studio.

- 2009–2011, 24 Denmark Street, Soho, Central London

With the development of the London Crossrail Link, along with the London Astoria, Astoria 2, The Metro, The Ghetto and Sin nightclub, a section of Denmark Place also needed to be demolished. This included both the office and studios of TotalRock, though largely, Enterprise Studios were able to remain until the complete destruction of Denmark Street north in 2015. Studio Sonic practice and recording studios in the basement were also evicted. With this, TotalRock moved to Denmark Street, also known as the British Tin Pan Alley.

- 2011–2013, 8-10 Rhoda Street, London Borough of Tower Hamlets, East End of London

In mid-2011, TotalRock once again relocated their entire premises to Rhoda Street just off Brick Lane in East London.

- 2013–2014, The Cape of Good Hope, Albany Street, Euston, North London

TotalRock next enjoyed a brief six months at the post-war built pub with studios built in the cellar. The premises were newly decorated to a rock bar theme but due to bad trade the landlord returned his lease.

- Present

The station continues to broadcast with live shows via remote.

== TotalRock Television ==
In 2001 TotalRock became available on Sky Digital as a radio channel. This ceased in 2002.

In 2006 TotalRock and Rockworld TV teamed up to bring a show, TotalRock Presents...Licensed To Rock. This was broadcast on Sky Digital channel 368 and on IPTV at Rockworld's website.

TotalRock have a YouTube Channel to host video interviews.

== DJs ==
Notable DJs have included Tommy Vance, (Stephen Robinson) Malcolm Dome, Nigel Skull Roberts, Steve 'Krusher' Joule, Angelina Håkansson, Robin Guy, Doogie White, Bill Steer, Julia Hardy, Anna Phoebe, Natasha Scharf, Chris Dale, Dom Lawson, Bob Slayer, Garry Bushell, Neal Kay, Ginger Wildheart, Alan Freeman, Jim Garrett, & Pandora.
