= Superchips =

British company

- Predecessor: P.J. Detection Techniques
- Headquarters: Watford, United Kingdom
- Services: Electronic engine tuning
- Subsidiaries: Superchips Inc.
- Website: www.superchips.co.uk

Superchips Ltd was a British company specialising in electronic engine tuning of cars. It was established in 1977 by Peter Wales as P.J. Detection Techniques, and was renamed Superchips in 1991. The company was based in Buckingham, and has dealers of its products worldwide. The company went into administration in March 2020 at the start of the pandemic and was purchased by Octopus Automotive Ltd who also owned the largest mobile remapping company in the UK; Remap Kings. Both companies, Remap Kings and Superchips were then acquired in April 2025 by SGL Holdings Limited for an undisclosed amount.

The two brands; Superchips and Remap Kings work together to offer a range of tuning solutions and ECU software throughout the UK and overseas, with a unique, online ordering and booking system. Tuning can be booked where a technician comes to a customer's address as well as a full range of tuning solutions for most cars, vans, lorries, and motorhomes. Engine Control Unit (ECU) upgrades produce more power and torque for a wide range of popular vehicles such as:

- BMW 1 Series
- Ford Focus
- Renault Clio V6
- Škoda Fabia
- Volkswagen Golf

The additional power is produced by re-mapping the ECU's settings by changing various settings created by the vehicle's original manufacturer.

Amongst other solutions, Superchips also produces the Bluefin tool that plugs into a car's diagnostic port and allows for re-mapping to be done at home, meaning the vehicle owner and can take the map on and off as desired.

The Superchips brand and its Bluefin product are still sold all over the world, with popular markets being Australia and India.

== American subsidiary ==
In 1992, Superchips Inc. was established in Sanford, Florida, US and developed products for the North American market. The subsidiary was sold to MSD Ignition in 2005 for $40 million. The company was merged with Edge Products in 2011 and the Superchips brand of products is now distributed by Powerteq, LLC.

== Motorsport ==
Superchips was the official tuning partner of Volkswagen Racing UK and provided custom remapping on all VW Racing UK's cars for Volkswagen Racing Cup. The company also provides tuning to Mini Coopers in the Scottish Mini Challenge, and to all cars in the BRDC's Single Seater Championship at Silverstone.
