= Creative Community for Peace =

Pro-Israel organization in Hollywood

- Formation: 2011
- Type: Nonprofit
- Headquarters: California
- Website: www.creativecommunityforpeace.com

Creative Community for Peace (CCFP) is an American pro-Israel organization that works to counter anti-Israel sentiment in the entertainment industry. It was founded in 2011 by David Renzer, Steve Schnur, and Ran Geffen-Lifshitz. CCFP strongly opposes the Boycott, Divestment and Sanctions (BDS) movement.

CCFP contacts celebrities who are scheduled to perform in Israel, attempting to counter BDS lobbying for them to cancel their appearances. CCFP describes its role as supporting and informing artists.

== Founding ==
Creative Community for Peace was founded in 2011 by former Universal Music Publishing CEO David Renzer, Steve Schnur, and MMG Music founder Ran Geffen-Lifshitz. The founders decided to start the organization during a 2011 breakfast meeting at the Dan Hotel in Tel Aviv while discussing the BDS movement. They asked friends and coworkers in Hollywood to contact celebrities scheduled to perform in Tel Aviv to counter BDS efforts lobbying for cancellations of their appearances in Israel.

== Views ==
Creative Community for Peace is a pro-Israel organization that works to counter anti-Israel sentiment in the entertainment industry. Its website focuses on Israel's cultural diversity and technology, with less focus on the Israeli–Palestinian conflict. In 2014, Geffen-Lifshitz said its sole purpose is to help artists and performers navigate appearances in Israel.

In 2019, Schnur said that CCFP is apolitical and non-religious. He said its vision is to help peacefully resolve the Israeli–Palestinian conflict through "dialogue and conversation and education". Its website says CCFP's members have diverse views about peace can be achieved.

CCFP director Ari Ingel has said that misinformation about Israel is being spread online and amplified by social media influencers who lack a full understanding of the Israeli-Palestinian conflict. He criticized Clubhouse for not monitoring hate speech, and said the app contained anti-Jewish conspiracy theories and antisemitic tropes.

CCFP opposes Boycott, Divestment and Sanctions. In 2013, The Forward wrote that CCFP disputes the use of the term "occupation" to describe Israel's occupation of the West Bank. It says that Israeli settlements are not an obstacle to peace and denies that Israel practices apartheid. CCFP believes that boycotting Israel does not conduce to peace. It has claimed that some artists have been harassed or physically threatened by BDS groups.

Renzer says CCFP seeks to create multicultural experiences and events. He has also expressed support for the Black community, while saying that Louis Farrakhan should distance himself from his "previous anti-Semitic comments". Ingel expressed support for the Black community's fight for justice in the United States, but added that "fighting racism with antisemitism is unacceptable." In 2020, Renzer said that Jews and African Americans have a long history of standing together for civil rights. He said he wanted to work with the Black entertainment community to "amplify voices of reason". Ingel works with the Black-Jewish Entertainment Alliance in addition to CCFP.

== Activities ==
When it was founded, Creative Community for Peace began reaching out to celebrities who were scheduled to play in Tel Aviv in an attempt to counter BDS lobbying for celebrities to cancel their appearances in Israel. In 2013, Lana Melman, then CCFP's director, said its members use their personal connections to reach out to other artists and give them "balanced information" about Israel, additionally educating them about "the artistic freedom there, and work[ing] to arrest potential cancellations". In 2013, David Siegel, consul-general for Israel in Los Angeles, said CCFP is "effective because they work from inside the industry". CCFP reaches out to every major artist or performer scheduled to appear in Israel and helps prepare them for BDS campaigns they may face.

=== 2013–2021 ===
In 2013, BDS activists organized a petition to persuade Alicia Keys not to play in "apartheid Israel". It had 16,000 signatures. In response, CCFP board members disputed the apartheid comparison and organized their own petition, which received 18,000 signatures. Keys did play in Israel.

Six weeks after the 2014 Gaza War began, CCFP published a petition signed by almost 200 Hollywood figures in Billboard, The Hollywood Reporter, and Variety that expressed support for Israel and criticized Hamas. It called for peace, expressed sadness over the loss of life on both sides, and described Hamas as a terrorist organization determined to destroy Israel.

In 2018, CCFP hosted its inaugural "Ambassadors of Peace" event with more than 400 attendees. One award winner, Scooter Braun, said at the event, "The best way we can change the world is coming together and having a dialogue with the intention that all people are good people, and I think this organization pushes for that."

In 2019, 11,200 people signed a CCFP petition expressing support for the Eurovision Song Contest scheduled to be held in Israel that year.

Also in 2019, CCFP hosted its second "Ambassadors of Peace" event, with more than 400 entertainment industry executives in attendance. Ziggy Marley and Jacqueline Saturn were honored at the event as Ambassadors. Another winner, Aaron Bay-Schuck, called CCFP an organization that "understands that music is a force for change" and called the BDS movement "cowardly, hypocritical and bullying in its purest form".

During the 2021 Israel–Palestine crisis, more than 125 entertainment industry figures, including Gene Simmons and Michael Bublé, signed a CCFP open letter urging "peace, balanced discourse and an end to inflammatory one-sided accounts". The letter also acknowledged the pain and loss on both sides of the conflict.

=== Gaza war (2023–present) ===
After the Hamas-led October 7 attacks, CCFP released an open letter "unequivocally voicing support for Israel and condemning Hamas's terrorism". Over 700 entertainment industry figures signed, including Jerry Seinfeld, Michael Douglas, Helen Mirren, Tracy-Ann Oberman, Chris Pine, Andy García, Liev Schreiber, Jamie Lee Curtis, Mark Hamill, Ziggy Marley, Zachary Levi, Howie Mandel, John Fogerty, Chuck Liddell, Jason Alexander, Emmanuelle Chriqui, and Gal Gadot.

In 2024, CCFP petitioned the National Academy of Television Arts and Sciences with 150 signatures from the entertainment industry to rescind the Emmy Awards nomination of Bisan Owda's documentary It's Bisan from Gaza and I'm Still Alive, which depicts her and her family's displacement from Beit Hanoun. CCFP alleged that Owda is connected to the Popular Front for the Liberation of Palestine (PFLP). NATAS responded with details of its editorial process, including finding no evidence of Owda's involvement with PFLP. The fact-checking website Misbar called CCFP's effort to get Owda's Emmy nomination rescinded a smear campaign.

In fall 2024, CCFP released an open letter opposing boycotts of Israeli and Jewish authors and literary institutions. The letter decried efforts to "demonize and ostracize Jewish authors across the globe". It was signed by over 1,000 entertainers, authors and artists, including Nobel Prize winners Elfriede Jelinek and Herta Müller, Booker Prize winner Howard Jacobson, Mayim Bialik, Simon Sebag Montefiore, Bernard-Henri Lévy, Pulitzer Prize winner David Mamet, Ozzy Osbourne, Gene Simmons, Debra Messing, Rebecca De Mornay, Jennifer Jason Leigh, Julianna Margulies, Jerry O'Connell, Scooter Braun, Jenji Kohan, Adam Gopnik, Diane Warren, Ayaan Hirsi Ali, Lionel Shriver, and Amy Sherman-Palladino.

In September 2025, the CCFP released an open letter rejecting the Film Workers for Palestine's pledge not to cooperate with Israeli film institutions due to the war in Gaza. It was signed by over 1,200 film industry professionals, including Liev Schreiber, Mayim Bialik, Haim Saban, Greg Berlanti, Howie Mandel, Lisa Edelstein, Erin Foster, and Debra Messing.

In March 2026, CCFP engaged in a campaign to prevent The Voice of Hind Rajab, a film documenting the 2024 killing of Hind Rajab by IDF soldiers, from winning an Oscar. CCFP called the film "propaganda" and "manipulation" and cast doubt on the circumstances that led to Rajab's killing.

== Celebrity involvement ==
The BDS movement was active in trying to get Alicia Keys not to visit Israel. CCFP worked with her management team to facilitate her trip. It also connected her with Idan Raichel, whom it says is focused on using music as a means of peace and coexistence. Keys performed in Israel with a multicultural group of musicians.

Bhad Bhabie appeared at CCFP's 2019 Ambassadors of Peace event. She posted a picture of herself at the event, tagging CCFP and captioning it "BHABIE SUPPORTS PEACE BICH". Despite BDS protests, she gave a concert in Tel Aviv-Yafo.

CCFP worked closely with Cyndi Lauper and her team on a trip to Israel, organizing an event at Tel Aviv's LGBT Center. Lauper praised Israel's "warmth, democracy and diversity". The Times of Israel called the event a "huge success for Israel advocacy".

Diane Warren is active with CCFP.

In 2013, Eric Burdon canceled a show in Tel Aviv after pressure from BDS activists. According to CCFP, the BDS activism was "violent" and Burdon feared for his safety. CCFP reached out to him and convinced him he would be safe in Israel, after which Burdon performed there.

Haim Saban supports CCFP.

CCFP released a video of Shaquille O'Neal wishing all Jews a happy Sukkot.

== Connection to StandWithUs ==
While waiting for approval of its tax-exempt status, CCFP partnered with the nonprofit organization StandWithUs to be able to receive tax-deductible donations.

In 2013, The Forward reported that CCFP did not yet have tax-exempt status, that the partnership was ongoing, and that CCFP was sharing office space with SWU. In a press release shared in full in Billboard, CCFP said it cut costs by sharing accounting and HR services with SWU and that both groups paid their share. Adalah-NY has claimed that CCFP is a branch of StandWithUs.

CCFP's founders have maintained that it has no formal partnership with SWU. Renzer told The Forward that CCFP had always been independent from SWU and had "no day-to-day relationship" with it.
