= Third Ear Band (album) =

Studio album by Third Ear Band
- Released: 1970
- Genre: Progressive folk
- Length: 36:46
- Label: Harvest (original release), BGO (reissue)
- Producer: Andrew King

Third Ear Band chronology
Alchemy (1969)	Third Ear Band (1970)	Abelard and Heloise (1970)

Professional ratings
Review scores
Source	Rating
Allmusic	4.5/5 stars

Third Ear Band was the second album by the Third Ear Band, released in 1970. It consists of four improvised pieces, "Air", "Earth", "Fire", and "Water", and is therefore sometimes known as "Elements".

== Track listing ==
All compositions by Coff, Minns, Smith and Sweeney.

1. "Air" – 10:30
2. "Earth" – 9:53
3. "Fire" – 9:19
4. "Water" – 7:04

== Personnel ==
- Paul Minns – oboe
- Glen Sweeney – percussion
- Ursula Smith – cello
- Richard Coff – violin and viola
