= Jacqueline Saturn =

- Occupation(s): President of Virgin Music Group North America and Executive Vice-President of Global Artist Relations
- Employer: Virgin Music Group

Jacqueline Saturn is the President of Virgin Music Group North America and Executive Vice- President of Global Artist Relations for Virgin Music Group, the world’s leading partner to independent music companies and artists. Saturn's influence is well-acknowledged, garnering recognition on Billboard’s “Power 100,” “Women in Music," and “Indie Power Players” lists, as well as, Variety's Women’s Impact Report. Her extensive career in the music domain has been featured in Rolling Stone, Music Business Worldwide, Variety, and more. She is also on the Los Angeles Chapter Board of the Recording Academy® and holds the position of Chapter Governor.

== Career ==
Saturn began her career with Epic Records in 1993 as an assistant in the label's promotions department. She became the vice president of alternative radio promotion in 1998 and senior vice president of rock and alternative promotion in 2005. In 2007, Saturn was promoted to senior vice president of promotion, responsible for the label's promotion strategies and supervising the promotion staff. She held the position until she left the label in 2013 after working there for 20 years. She left the label in July 2013. Upon her departure, a party was organized by Epic Records' chairman and CEO L.A. Reid to celebrate her work over the 20 years that she was employed at Epic. The party was held in the penthouse of the Dream Hotel in New York and attended by record executives that included Charlie Walk, Tom Poleman, and Joel Klaiman.

Saturn left Epic Records in 2013 to join Harvest Records, a subsidiary of Capitol Records Music Group. She joined the label as its general manager, a position she shares with business executive Piero Giramonti. Saturn previously worked for Capitol Music Group's CEO Steve Barnett for 9 years during her time at Epic.

In September 2018, Saturn was promoted to President of Caroline, Capitol Music Group's independent distribution and label arms service. Saturn will lead a 50-person U.S. team and work in tandem with Caroline's 11 international offices. She will oversee all aspects of Caroline business, including artist and label signings, partnerships and strategic alliances. In February 2021, Saturn became President of Virgin Music, shortly after Universal fully acquired Caroline from Capitol Music Group and re-branded its label and artist services.
