= Tommy Vance =

British radio presenter (1940–2005)

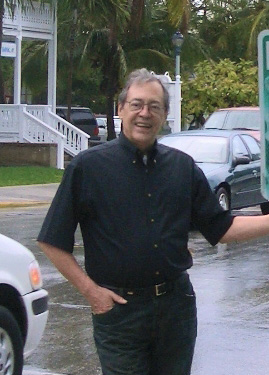
- Vance in January 2005
- Born: Richard Anthony Crispian Francis Prew Hope-Weston; 11 July 1940; Eynsham, Oxfordshire, England
- Died: 6 March 2005 (aged 64); Dartford, Kent, England
- Other names: Rick West
- Occupations: Radio host; presenter; DJ
- Years active: 1960–2004
- Known for: Friday Rock Show (1978–1993)
- Television: Top of the Pops, Dumber and Dumber, The 11 O'Clock Show, The Nightfly and The Friday Rock Show (VH1)
- Spouses: Fern Johnson (divorced); Susan Hanson (divorced); Stella Brusa (divorced)
- Children: 2

Richard Anthony Crispian Francis Prew Hope-Weston (11 July 1940 – 6 March 2005), known professionally as Tommy Vance, was an English radio broadcaster. He was an important factor in the rise of the new wave of British heavy metal, along with London-based disc jockey Neal Kay, in the late 1970s and early 1980s. Vance was one of the first radio hosts in the United Kingdom to broadcast hard rock and heavy metal in the early 1980s, providing the only national radio forum for both bands and fans. The Friday Rock Show that he hosted gave new bands airtime for their music and fans an opportunity to hear it. He used a personal tagline of "TV on the radio". His voice was heard by millions around the world announcing the Wembley Stadium acts at Live Aid in 1985.

== Early life and education ==
Born Richard Anthony Crispian Francis Prew Hope-Weston in Eynsham, Oxfordshire, on 11 July 1940, his grandmother owned a travelling repertory theatre company, his father was an electronics engineer, and his mother a former singer and dancer.

Expelled from school at 15 for truancy, Vance got his first job as trainee manager at the Hyde Park Hotel in London. He joined the merchant navy in 1956, aged 16, as a cabin boy. While docked in New York City listening to U.S. radio, Vance was inspired to begin toying with becoming a disc jockey. Like a number of his contemporaries, while growing up in the 1950s, he listened to British broadcasting, but he fell in love with the brash sound and format of American commercial radio.

When Vance returned to the UK, he worked as a mechanic for a jukebox company so that he could hear music for free. Unable to find an opening in British radio, he enrolled at a Northern Irish college, where he also became a part-time actor and stagehand. He joined the Ulster Bridge Repertory Company, run by the actor James Ellis, as a stage manager.

== Career ==
=== KOL Seattle and KHJ Los Angeles ===
In 1964, Vance moved to Vancouver, Washington, in pursuit of his first wife, Fern. He was hired by KOL Seattle as its prime drive-time jock. The programme was originally intended for another presenter who pulled out of the deal at the last moment. The station had invested heavily with the jingle package and pre-launch publicity that it had developed for the original "Tommy Vance". Vance recalled: "The station asked if I would take the name as they had already made the jingles for him. I said, for that kind of money you can call me what you like mate!".

He got into a pay dispute with KOL and quit and went on to voice his displeasure on rival KJR where he co-hosted for a few days with KJR's prime time jock Pat O'Day.

From there Vance moved to Los Angeles, where he was offered a show by programming consultant Bill Drake on KHJ radio (aka Boss Radio), holding the evening 9-midnight airshift at KHJ for a few months in late 1965.

KHJ was one of the most successful and influential Top 40 stations of the era and California in 1965 was a great place to be. However, the United States also was then involved in the Vietnam War. When Tommy received draft papers for the U.S. Army, he decided it was time to return to the UK. For the next several months Vance filed occasional phone-in reports for KHJ covering the British music scene.

=== Offshore Pirate Radio ===
Vance returned to the UK in 1965 just before Christmas with British musician Ian Whitcomb who lent him the fare. Bill Hearne hired Vance for Radio Caroline South, where his colleagues included Johnnie Walker, Dave Lee Travis, Tony Blackburn and Emperor Rosko. On 3 January 1966, Vance presented his first show on Caroline South; his slogan was "TV on radio" and used Jack Costanzo's version of the "Naked City Theme" as his signature tune.

Vance released a handful of singles; "You Must Be the One", and covers of Silhouettes and The Rolling Stones', "Off the Hook".

Vance's wife was not pleased with the idea that her husband was going to be with Caroline South, on a ship two weeks out of three, where she would be living in an unfamiliar city on her own. Vance left Caroline South and moved to Radio Luxembourg. Nonetheless, the marriage did not last. Radio Caroline's Ronan O'Rahilly suggested Vance he should return to the ship, he rejoined Caroline South in December 1966.

During the summer of 1967, it became apparent that the government was going to legislate against the offshore pirate stations. Vance heard a rumour that Philip Birch, boss of Wonderful Radio London, was negotiating to move his station to France and Vance wanted to be a part of it. In July 1967, he transferred to Radio London – however, Big L failed to find a base on the continent. Rather than break the new law, the station closed down on 14 August. Vance's stay with the station was very brief.

=== Radio 1, BBC World Service and Capital Radio ===
After the pirates were closed down in 1967, the BBC's new station, BBC Radio 1, adopted much of their musical philosophy and took on many of their personnel including Caroline colleagues Tony Blackburn, Johnnie Walker and Radio London's John Peel. Vance co-hosted the "progressive" show Top Gear with Peel.

When the programme was given to Peel to present solo, Vance moved to the BBC World Service in the late 1960s, launching the popular "Pop Club". Each installment of the programme started with a song from Cliff Richard, who was the nominal president of the club. Listeners to the BBC World Service from all over the world would apply to become members of Pop Club, receiving a membership card, special badges and gifts. Every week Vance would read listeners' letters and played requests with one being chosen as the "letter of the week".

Vance was becoming frustrated with his lack of progress, however, and joined Radio Monte Carlo International with Dave Cash and Kenny Everett. In October 1973, all three would join the newly launched London-based Capital Radio, Britain's first legal commercial pop station. Initially co-presenting the morning show with Joan Shenton, then playing Capital's very first reggae and soul music on a weekend show.

In 1975, Vance made a brief film appearance as disc jockey Ricky Storm, in Richard Loncraine's Slade in Flame, a vehicle for the group Slade. By 1976, Vance was also on the Portsmouth ILR station Radio Victory. He was also frequently heard on independent radio voicing advertisements.

At a time when punk was being shunned by the press, he carried out the first in-depth interview with Johnny Rotten of the Sex Pistols in 1977, whose single 'Pretty Vacant' was A-listed on Capital's playlist. Rotten talked at length about his love of reggae music, at a time when the group were given very little media exposure other than in the weekly music press. Vance also presented Capital's Hitline Top 30 on Sunday evenings, based on listener votes, starting from the top of the chart. He would often abandon the chart during the 20–30 positions, in favour of album tracks by rock bands such as Led Zeppelin.

=== BBC and the Friday Rock Show ===
Vance returned to Radio 1 in November 1978 to begin a 15-year stint hosting the show for which he is best remembered – the Friday Rock Show. He was to become associated with heavy metal and rock music; his deep, resonant, booming voice and catchphrase "classic cuts" have been much imitated. The first record which he played on the show, and with which he finished on his final programme in 1993, was 'Rock 'n' Roll Damnation' by AC/DC. A 1983 edition was the first radio programme to use only compact discs. His signature music was "Take It Off the Top" by Dixie Dregs and then he would say in his gravelly voice, "Hi, this is TV on the radio and welcome to the programme that we call the Friday Rock Show."

Vance had a two-year stint (10 January 1982 to 1 January 1984) hosting the Sunday-afternoon Top 40, where he showed knowledge of and enthusiasm for a wide range of music and displayed a similar keenness when he hosted Top of the Pops around the same time. He also deputised on the Top 40 for Richard Skinner (in 1984 and 1985), Bruno Brookes (in 1987) and Mark Goodier (in 1991 and 1992).

Vance was a daily presenter on BFBS from 1976 to 1987 and so he also became known in Germany, where BFBS was popular among a civilian audience despite being aimed officially at British military personnel. He also presented a weekly chart show for BFBS as well as other programmes such as Soul Bowl. In addition to presenting the best-selling singles chart of 1982 and 1983, Vance also presented the equivalent show in 1991 despite not presenting the weekly chart at the time.

From 1984 to 1985, Vance hosted a Thursday night AOR programme on Radio 1, "Into the Music". This was in place for about a year before being taken off in favour of Andy Kershaw. At a similar time, the "Friday Rock Show" gained an extra hour on MW only, during which the rock charts were aired.

When the BBC's new radio station for London, Greater London Radio (GLR), was launched in 1988, Vance presented the drivetime show, mixing album-oriented rock and current affairs dubbed "rock and rolling news". He also became a continuity announcer for BBC2 in the early 1970s as well as Sky One in the late 1980s and interviewed for the BBC World Service.

Vance was a frequent choice as master of ceremonies at award shows, concerts and festivals; such as Monsters of Rock at Donington Park.

Vance departed Radio 1 in March 1993, however he never left the BBC entirely. He continued to host Rock Salad for the World Service for many years.

=== Later years ===
Vance was a key player in the launch of Virgin Radio in March 1993, presenting the Drivetime show, a move he later regretted as the station dropped its adventurous format in favour of an ad-driven playlist.

Vance co-founded the internet radio station Rock Radio Network with his former Radio 1 producer Tony Wilson, music promoter Andy King and journalist Malcolm Dome in 1997, rebranding as TotalRock in 2000.

Vance developed business interests with the Silk Sound studios in Soho, later joined by The Bridge.

On 13 June 2001, Vance joined US rockers Cheap Trick on stage at The Garage in Islington, where they played their first three albums in their entirety on three nights. Vance performed the spoken DJ part on the song 'On The Radio' from the album 'Heaven Tonight'. Other guests on the three nights were Roy Wood, Pat Cash and Chrissie Hynde.

Vance joined digital music channel VH-1 UK from its inception in 1994 with 'The Nightfly', later reviving 'The Friday Rock Show', which ran for some years until 2002. Vance featured twice in the Channel 4 comedy series, The 11 O'Clock Show, the spot was called Tommy Vance's News Slam in which he took a minute to read out news headlines. He was presenter and voiceover for the Channel 5 series Dumber and Dumber and had a much quoted appearance on Brass Eye.

Perhaps his most memorable TV appearance came in 2004 when he walked out of ITV's Hell's Kitchen. He decided to leave the show after escaping a scalding from boiling fat and foulmouthed abuse from the celebrity chef, Gordon Ramsay. Vance's agent stated that he felt the environment was "dangerous" and that he was a risk to himself and the other contestants due to his age.

When Vance moved to Spain, it was with the intention of a gentle semi-retirement. It was not long before he was back on the air playing music for the tourists and ex-pats on the Costa del Sol's Spectrum FM. He came back to Britain and worked again, doing commercials, appearing on television and returning to Virgin to present a weekly show on their DAB and internet offshoot, Virgin Classic Rock.

== Death ==
Vance died at Darent Valley Hospital in Dartford, Kent in the early hours of 6 March 2005, three days after suffering a stroke at his home. He was cremated at Golders Green Crematorium in London, where his ashes were interred. Vance was survived by his ex-wife and their son and daughter.

== Tributes ==
On 11 March 2005, five days after Vance's death, TotalRock ran Rock On, Tommy Day, a 15-hour live broadcast celebrating his life and work, including much music, numerous testimonials from artists and colleagues, and also from people who wrote down their thoughts on Tommy at a special Forum, In Memoriam: Tommy Vance, put up at the TotalRock website. As a finale, after the actual live broadcast had ended, the last Friday Rock Show Vance recorded for BBC Radio 1 in 1993 was re-broadcast.

Author Paul Stenning dedicated his biographies of Iron Maiden and Slash to Vance.

On 31 March 2006, a Tommy Vance Tribute Night, in association with the Teenage Cancer Trust foundation, was held at the Royal Albert Hall in London. Judas Priest, Scorpions and Ian Gillan all performed to pay tribute. There were also special stage appearances by Roger Daltrey and Bruce Dickinson.

In early 2018, it was announced that a new festival, Stonedeaf (now Stonedead), would be naming their stage after Tommy Vance. In true Monsters of Rock fashion with one day and one stage, the event is held annually at Newark Showground.

In February 2024, artificial intelligence was used to recreate his voice for station ID on the Boom Radio spin-off station Boom Rock, which launched on 14 February. His voice was used after the owners of the station received permission from his family.

Media offices
Preceded by Tony Blackburn	BBC Radio 1 chart show presenter 10 January 1982 – 1 January 1984	Succeeded by Simon Bates
Preceded by Mark Goodier	BBC Radio 1 chart show presenter 8 March 1992	Succeeded by Bruno Brookes
