= Virgin Music =

Record label; music distributing arm of Virgin Music Group

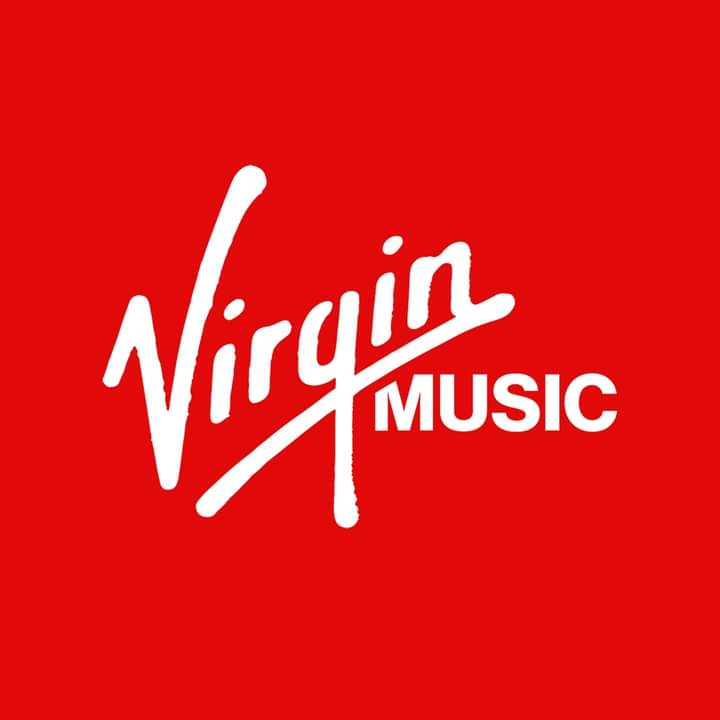
- Formerly: Caroline Distribution (1983–2021); Virgin Music Label & Artist Services (2021–2022)
- Industry: Music publishing
- Predecessor: Fontana Distribution
- Founded: 1983; 43 years ago
- Defunct: October 19, 2023; 2 years ago
- Successor: Virgin Music Group
- Headquarters: United States

Virgin Music, known as Virgin Music Label & Artist Services until 2022 and originally as Caroline Distribution, was a music distributor of independent artists and record labels. Virgin Music operated as a subsidiary of Virgin Music Group, and was owned by Universal Music Group. The company focused on the distribution of new or emerging partners. Virgin Music had its operation in United States, with its flagship formerly operating in Japan, the United Kingdom, Germany, France, and across Latin America.

== History ==
In 1983, Caroline Distribution was established by Richard Branson & Virgin Records. In 2019, Universal Music Group acquired the digital music and network company INgrooves (including the independent label distributor Fontana Distribution).

According to Billboard reporter Ed Christman; “Between Caroline and Ingrooves, UMG’s indie owned distributors will have a combine market share of about 4.4 percent Billboard estimates, based on year-end numbers”. On 18 February 2021, Universal Music Group announced Virgin Music Label & Artist Services, a new global network to deliver premium and flexible artist and label services.

Following its launch, Universal Music Group retained Caroline Distribution president Jacqueline Saturn, to head Virgin Music label and artist services division of Virgin Music Group.

In September 2022, Universal Music Group announced the launch of Virgin Music Group. Following its launch, its Label & Artist Services began operating as Virgin Music. On 22 September 2022, Sumerian Records signed a distribution deal with Virgin Music.

In September 2023, Virgin Music Group established Virgin Music Nigeria.

In October 2023, Virgin Music Group combined with Virgin Music.
