= Third Ear Band =

English folk band

Third Ear Band were a British musical group formed in London during the mid-1960s. Their line-up initially consisted of violin, cello, oboe and percussion. Most of their performances were instrumental and partly improvised. Their records for the Harvest label, Alchemy and Third Ear Band, achieved some popularity, after which they found some success creating soundtrack music for films.

== History ==
Dave Tomlin, who had initiated free-form jazz sessions at the London Free School, began similar sessions at the UFO Club by assembling members of the audience, usually at 4 am, into a free-form group playing for the, by then, exhausted dancers. The drummer, Glen Sweeney, was sometimes so carried away he had to be told that the rest of the group had finished. They became known as The Giant Sun Trolley.

Members came from The Giant Sun Trolley and The People Band to create an improvised music drawing on Eastern raga forms, European folk, experimental and medieval influences. They recorded their first session in 1968 for Ron Geesin, which was released under the pseudonym of The National-Balkan Ensemble on one side of a Standard Music Library disc.

Their first album, Alchemy, was released on the EMI Harvest label in 1969, and featured John Peel, the BBC disc jockey who did much to publicise the group, playing Jew's harp on one track. This was followed by an eponymous second album containing four tracks, "Air", "Earth", "Fire" and "Water", which reached wider attention due to the inclusion of one track on the Harvest sampler album Picnic – A Breath of Fresh Air.

They recorded two soundtracks, the first in 1970 for an animated film by Herbert Fuchs of Abelard and Heloise (which first saw release as part of Luca Ferrari's Necromancers of the Drifting West Sonic Book in 1997) and then in 1971 for Roman Polanski's film of Macbeth. After various later incarnations and albums they finally disbanded in 1993, owing to leader and percussionist Glen Sweeney's ongoing health problems.

They also appeared in the Rolling Stones Free Concert at Hyde Park on 5 July 1969, and played at the Isle of Wight Festival the next month.

== Collective band members ==
- Glen 'Zen' Sweeney: hand drums, wind chimes, drums
- Paul Minns: oboe, recorder
- Brian Meredith: cello, electrically modified cello
- Clive Kingsley: electric guitar
- Richard Coff: lead violin
- Benjamin Cartland: viola
- Mel Davis: cello, slide pipes
- Ursula Smith: cello, violin
- Paul Buckmaster: cello, bass guitar
- Simon House: violin, VCS3
- Denim Bridges: guitars
- Neville Nixon: guitar
- Dave Tomlin: bass guitar, violin on "Alchemy"
- Mike Marchant: guitar, vocals
- Allan Samuel: violin
- Neil Black: violin, midi violin
- Mick Carter: electric guitar
- Lyn Dobson: soprano saxophone, flute, vocals
- John Peel: jaw harp on "Alchemy"
- Keith Chegwin: vocals on "Music from Macbeth"
- Morgan Fisher: keyboards, VCS3 for a short time '72/'73

== Discography ==
=== Studio albums ===
- Alchemy (1969)
- Third Ear Band (a.k.a. Elements) (1970)
- Abelard and Heloise (1970)
- Music from Macbeth (soundtrack to Macbeth, Roman Polanski's film adaptation of Shakespeare's The Tragedy of Macbeth) (1972)
- The Magus (1972 - released in 2005 - first release was 1991 under the title Prophecies)
- Live Ghosts (1988)
- Magic Music aka New Age Magical Music (1990)
- Brain Waves (1993)
- Necromancers of the Drifting West (1997) (Geesin session, BBC tracks & outtakes)

=== Mini-album ===
- Radio Sessions (1988)

=== Live ===
- New Forecasts from the Third Ear Almanach (1989)
- Live (1999)
- Exorcisms (2016)
- Spirits (Live at Circolo Tuxedo, Italy, 1989) (2017)

=== Compilations ===
- The National-Balkan Ensemble (1968)
- Experiences (1976)
- Songs From The Hydrogen Jukebox (1998)
- Hymn to the Sphynx (2001)
- Elements 1970-1971 with many previously unreleased tracks (2018)
