= Joel Klaiman =

American music industry executive

- Education: Syracuse University
- Occupation: Music industry executive
- Years active: 1994-present
- Employer(s): ASCEND4M; Tunespotter
- Title: CEO
- Board member of: TJ Martell Foundation
- Awards: Billboard Power 100 (2015-2018); Variety Hitmakers 20 (2017-2020)

Joel Klaiman is an American music industry executive. He is the founder and CEO of ASCEND4M entertainment agency, and the CEO of Tunespotter. Klaiman is a former president of Hitco Entertainment; previously, he was a senior executive at Columbia Records, Epic Records and Universal Republic Records. Over the course of his career, he has worked with artists including Adele, Beyoncé, John Legend, Harry Styles and Taylor Swift. He is credited with designing the promotional campaigns that resulted in the crossover success of singles by artists such as Swift, Pharrell, and Daft Punk.

== Early life and education ==
Klaiman was born in Sharon, Massachusetts. He attended Lawrence Academy and Syracuse University.

== Career ==
=== 1994–2006: Frank DiLeo Management, Elektra Entertainment, Epic Records ===
Following graduation, Klaiman moved to New York City, where he worked for Frank DiLeo Management. He was hired as senior director of national alternative promotion for Elektra Entertainment Group in 1994, shifting his focus from management to radio promotion. At Elektra, Klaiman had mainstream success with alternative records by artists including Bjork, The Cure, Moby, Metallica, Tracy Chapman and Ween.

In 1999, Klaiman was appointed senior vice president of promotion at Epic Records. There, he had #1 records with Jennifer Lopez, Celine Dion and Shakira, among others. He was promoted to executive vice president of promotion in 2004.

=== 2006–present: Republic Records, Columbia Records, Hitco ===
Klaiman's role expanded from promotion to include artist development in 2006, when he was appointed senior vice president of promotion and artist development for Republic Records, a division of Universal Music Group. He was promoted to executive vice president in 2009. At Republic, Klaiman worked with artists early in their careers, helping to break Nicki Minaj, Drake, and Swift. He began working with her in 2008, and was noted for the success of her crossover single, "Love Story, which Rolling Stone described as a "pop smash", writing that it "lived a double life: The original version targeted a country audience with acoustic instrumentation while the mix for mainstream pop listeners accentuated electric guitars." He continued to work with Swift through the release of Speak Now and Red, which together went on to sell more than 12 million albums worldwide.

In December 2012, Klaiman was named executive vice president and general manager of Columbia Records, where he oversaw the label's marketing, digital, promotion, licensing and branding . Columbia was the #1 overall label in 2014, based in part on the success of the two top-selling singles of the year: John Legend's "All of Me" and Pharrell's "Happy.". Columbia released Adele's 25 in association with XL Recordings in 2015; the lead track from the album, "Hello," was the first ever single to sell more than a million singles digitally in 7 days. The album set sales records with 3.3 million units sold during its initial release week.

In 2018, Klaiman was named president of Hitco Entertainment, where he has worked with artists including Lopez, Big Boi, and Saint Jhn; Variety reported that Saint Jhn's single "Roses" was "all but inescapable" during the summer it was released, "dominating the upper echelons of U.S. radio and streaming charts."

In August 2023, Klaiman launched Ascend4m, a music and entertainment marketing and consulting agency with talent management, of which he is the CEO.

== Recognition ==
Klaiman was named to the Variety Hitmaker 20 in 2017 and 2020. He appeared on the Billboard list of the 100 most powerful executives in the music industry in 2015, 2016 2017, and 2018. He is a member of the Clio Music Jury, a voting member of the Rock and Roll Hall of Fame, and a member of the board of directors for the T.J. Martell Foundation.
