= MSD Ignition =

American automotive aftermarket manufacturer

- Company type: Private
- Industry: Automotive, Automotive Aftermarket
- Founded: El Paso, Texas, United States (1970)
- Founder: Jack Priegel
- Headquarters: El Paso, Texas, United States
- Area served: Worldwide distribution, North America, Western Europe, Australia
- Products: Multiple Spark Discharge for ignition systems
- Parent: Autotronic Controls Corporation
- Website: MSDignition.com

MSD Ignition is an American automotive aftermarket manufacturing company that specializes in high-end ignition system and electrical components.

== History ==
MSD Ignition was the first company in the world to experiment with Multiple Spark Discharge for the ignition system of internal combustion engines in 1970. The idea was first proposed by a group of engineers working on the White Sands Missile Range in southern New Mexico. The engineers worked for the research and development company Autotronic Controls Corporation (ACC) that was striving to develop leaner burning fuel systems to increase engine fuel efficiency. The engineers discovered that their limiting factor to efficiently burning the extremely lean air-fuel mixtures was that they did not have ample spark to ignite the mixtures. After a great deal of research and development they were able to introduce the first multiple spark system using capacitive discharge and put it on the market under the name Multiple Spark Discharge (MSD).

Shortly after coming onto the market, the new ignition system was also shown to work particularly well in racing applications in 1976. Word of mouth among top racers helped the product and the company's popularity grow. Now, the 7AL from MSD is one of the most popular ignition systems among all performance race engines. The company moved to new facilities in El Paso, Texas and started to develop an extensive line of other automotive ignition products. Although the official legal name remains ACC even today, the products are sold under the name MSD Ignition in reference to their original unique multiple spark technology.

The company has seen some trouble in introducing new features. One incident involving "slew rate rev limiters" as a form of basic traction control caused a number of the company's products to be banned from a variety of sanctioning bodies. Still, other products are mandated as required parts for certain classes in those same race organizations. In fact, in his book Custom Auto Wiring and Electrical, Matt Strong asserts that “the company with the most experience in the field has to be MSD, who has at least two duplicate ignitions in every NASCAR series race vehicle (cars and trucks alike).” Strong concludes, “If you want reliable high performance, splurge for MSD’s high-performance billet aluminum electronic distributor.”

== Company ==
MSD has been based in the greater El Paso, Texas area since its inception. Today it has facilities with more than 100,000 square feet (9,300 m^{2}) between two buildings on the east side of the city. Currently business and engineering are mostly based out of a building that has been with the company for more than 20 years while the US manufacturing processes are just a block away in a state-of-the-art facility.

In 2004, the original owner of the company, Jack Priegel, sold the company to a private investing firm when he decided to retire. Gryphon Investors announced that it would be purchasing the company and brought in Dan Gresham as the CEO. In December 2013, Z Capital announced it had acquired MDS parent company MSDG.

MSD has three main divisions, currently: MSD Ignition, MSD Powersports, and MSD Pro-Mag. All of these are operated out of the same facilities, but aim to serve different segments in the industry.

== Bankruptcy ==
MSD entered voluntary chapter 11 bankruptcy late in 2013 in an effort to reduce debt acquired in the purchase of several companies including Racepak and Edge Products. The results of this are still to be seen, but the company added "contending the case has the potential to free-fall into a Chapter 7 proceeding absent a sale process."

== Awards ==
Hot Rod Magazine named MSD's 6A ignition box into its second class of the Speed Parts Hall of Fame in 2009 in recognition of how the company has helped to shape the American racing industry. MSD also received honors as the SEMA manufacturer of the year in both 2005 and 2007. The current president of the company, Russell Stephens, has also served on the board of directors for SEMA (2002-2006).
