= Wet Dream (album) =

Studio album by Richard Wright
- Released: 22 September 1978
- Recorded: 10 January–14 February 1978
- Studios: Super Bear Studios, Berre-les-Alpes, France
- Genres: Progressive rock; instrumental rock; jazz fusion
- Length: 43:51 (original); 45:24 (2023 reissue)
- Labels: Harvest (UK) (1978); Columbia (US) (1978); Parlophone (2023 reissue)
- Producer: Richard Wright

Richard Wright chronology
Wet Dream (1978)	Identity (with Zee) (1984)

Singles from Wet Dream
- 1. "Cat Cruise" Released: 28 June 2023

Professional ratings
Review scores
Source	Rating
AllMusic	3/5 stars

Wet Dream is the debut solo studio album by Pink Floyd keyboardist Richard Wright, released in 1978.

== Background ==
Wet Dream was composed and produced by Wright, and recorded at Super Bear Studios, Berre-les-Alpes, Alpes-Maritimes, in early 1978, the same studio where Pink Floyd bandmate David Gilmour would record his solo album David Gilmour just weeks later.

Wright's then-wife, Juliette provided lyrics to either "Against the Odds", for which she was credited on the original release, or "Pink's Song", for which she was credited on the 2023 edition (see below). Juliette sang with an early version of Pink Floyd, then called The Tea Set. She can be heard singing a 1965 Roger Waters song ("Walk with Me Sydney") on the 2016 Pink Floyd boxed set The Early Years 1965-1972.

== Release and reception ==
The album went virtually unnoticed at the time. The album was long out of print in Wright's native UK, but it was re-released to some success on CD in the United States and Canada in the 1990s, and again in 2008 in Australia, following Wright's death.

=== 2023 reissue and remixes ===
The album was announced for a CD and digital re-issue on 28 July 2023, which would have been Wright's 80th birthday. It features a new stereo mix by Steven Wilson and new artwork featuring previously unused photos from the period. The new stereo mix was released on vinyl and on BD, which also includes multi-channel Dolby Atmos and 5.1 surround sound mixes by Wilson on 29 September 2023, the album's 45th anniversary. Wilson reinstated several short passages of music that had been edited out on the 1978 release. The 2023 reissues originally did not include the 1978 mix of the album, but after fan feedback a flat transfer pre-master of the original mix was added to the Blu-ray edition. On 28 June 2023 "Cat Cruise" was released as a digital single to promote the reissue.

The 2023 reissue credits Juliette Wright with the lyrics for "Pink's Song", however on the disc itself it shows that she was originally credited with the lyrics to "Against the Odds".

== Track listing ==
All tracks are written by Richard Wright, except either "Against the Odds" or "Pink's Song," composed by Wright, containing lyrics by Juliette Wright.

Side one
No.	Title	Length
1.	"Mediterranean C" (instrumental)	3:52
2.	"Against the Odds"	3:57
3.	"Cat Cruise" (instrumental)	5:14
4.	"Summer Elegy"	4:53
5.	"Waves" (instrumental)	4:19

Side two
No.	Title	Length
6.	"Holiday"	6:11
7.	"Mad Yannis Dance" (instrumental)	3:19
8.	"Drop In from the Top" (instrumental)	3:25
9.	"Pink's Song"	3:28
10.	"Funky Deux" (instrumental)	4:57

== Personnel ==
Credits taken from the original 1978 album and the 2023 reissue.

- Richard Wright: piano, electric piano, Hammond organ, Oberheim synthesizer, vocals, booklet photography (2023 reissue)
- Mel Collins: saxophones (1, 3, 5, 7, 10), flute (9)
- Snowy White: guitars
- Larry Steele: bass guitar
- Reg Isidore: drums, percussion
- Hipgnosis: album cover design
- Photography: Aubrey Powell / Rob Brimson
- Gala Wright and Jamie Wright: art direction (2023 reissue)
- Carl Glover: graphic design (2023 reissue)
- Costas Spathis: photography (2023 reissue)
- Steven Wilson: mixing (2023 reissue)

== Charts ==
1978 chart performance for Wet Dream
Chart (1978)	Peak position
Norwegian Albums (VG-lista)	20

2023 chart performance for Wet Dream
Chart (2023)	Peak position
Belgian Albums (Ultratop Wallonia)	197
German Albums (Offizielle Top 100)	26
Hungarian Physical Albums (MAHASZ)	17
Italian Albums (FIMI)	78
Portuguese Albums (AFP)	23
Scottish Albums (Official Charts)	31
Swiss Albums (Schweizer Hitparade)	22
UK Album Downloads (Official Charts)	34
