= Friday Rock Show =

UK radio show

The Friday Rock Show was a radio show in the United Kingdom that was broadcast on BBC Radio 1 from 10pm to midnight on Friday nights, from 17 November 1978 until 2 April 1993. For most of its existence, it was hosted by Tommy Vance.

Vance also hosted a television version for satellite channel VH1 in the 1990s. This series was axed in March 2002.

== History ==
Throughout most of its run, the show was hosted by Tommy Vance. Ostensibly for the genre of rock in general, it was most closely associated with heavy metal. In the early 1980s it was the only nationally available outlet for this genre of music, and Vance's enthusiasm for showcasing new bands and his rapport with fans made the show essential listening for rockers.

The show played a significant role in the rise of the new wave of British heavy metal, which came to dominate the show by the early 1980s. Initially the show had been intended as a continuation of Alan Freeman's 1973–78 Saturday afternoon show, and included elements of post-punk and new wave music. The show had the additional good fortune of being able to "borrow" the 88–91 MHz FM transmitters of BBC Radio 2, allowing listeners to enjoy the music in the best available quality for the time, before Radio 1 finally acquired its own FM frequency in 1988.

Before this happened, the show was temporarily given an extra hour from 21:00 to 22:00, probably because Alan Freeman's Capital London's Monday rock show had been moved to Friday nights starting at 21:00, and at this time, BBC Radio 1 was carried by BBC Radio London's VHF/FM frequency on weeknights between 20:00 and 22:00. After Radio 1's move to full-time FM broadcasting, the show's time slot was put back half an hour from 22:30 to 00:30, but only for a brief period and after returning to its original slot, the show was eventually moved to run from 21:00 to 23:00.

By 1993, the introduction into Britain of a much wider choice of television and radio channels had made heavy metal more accessible and the show less important, and Tommy Vance left Radio 1 to join the original line-up of Virgin Radio.

== Features ==
The show generally included a studio session or live performance each week. Many of these studio sessions were engineered, mixed and produced by Dave Dade, BBC Senior Studio Manager, who worked closely with show producer Tony Wilson. Also featured were recordings from the BBC radio archives, both live and studio-sessions, from as far back as the late 1960s. This material included bands such as Led Zeppelin, Deep Purple, Jethro Tull, Uriah Heep, The Nice, Rush and Genesis, among others. At the time the majority of this material was not available on general release and even today, in the current era of the deluxe edition CD album featuring bonus tracks, some remains unavailable to the general public, mainly because Tony Wilson took the tapes with him when he left the BBC in 1995.

Other features included "The Friday Night Connection", a quiz in which listeners had to identify three pieces of music and the connection or theme between them. From the beginning of 1985, this was replaced by "Lie Back And Enjoy It". Listeners would send in a list of tracks that would last for about 20 minutes, but did not have to have a connection. The person whose selection was chosen would still receive the record voucher and Van der Graaf's "Theme One" was still used to introduce the feature. In the late 80s, Vance introduced "Rock War" (later renamed "Rock Challenge" during the 1991 Gulf War), in which listeners were asked to vote for the best of three demo tapes sent in by aspiring bands. Another feature was the listeners' all-time chart, which took place once a year on the show's anniversary/birthday (Now We Are 1, Now We Are 2, etc.), during which were played the most popular rock tracks, as voted for by the listeners. (This invariably finished with Led Zeppelin's "Stairway to Heaven" at No. 1.)

For most of its run, its intro and closing theme tune was the Dixie Dregs instrumental "Take it Off the Top", and the quiz used the Van der Graaf Generator track "Theme One" (a cover of the theme tune originally written for Radio 1 by George Martin in 1967); other jingles were written and performed by Samson (with Nicky Moore on vocals), Rose Tattoo and Vow Wow. The show replaced John Peel on Friday nights, but Peel's show had previously featured more mainstream styles of rock music than he personally favoured as "part of a review function"; after the Friday Rock Show began, Peel was able to concentrate on the post-punk styles he was most enthused by at that point.

=== Bands ===
Incidental music was used whilst Vance was chatting between playing discs. Examples are "Red lady Too", George Harrison from his 1968 Apple LP Wonderwall Music; and "The Stumble", John Mayall with Peter Green. Decca 1967. Also "Open Invitation" by Santana from their 1978 LP Inner Secrets, spliced together by producer Tony Wilson from two guitar passages when the pace of the song accelerated.

"Jas'Moon" by the Nitty Gritty Dirt Band is another backing track, as is Stanley Clarke's "Silly Putty" (from the album Journey To Love). "Chasin' the Voodoo" by Al Di Meola is another (Album: Casino). The only Mahavishnu Orchestra 45 RPM record "Can't Stand Your Funk" from the 1974 record Visions of the Emerald Beyond was another musical bed for Tommy to talk over.

The tracks used as incidental music changed during the years the show was broadcast and towards the late 1980s no background music was used. A complete list of the tracks used as incidental music is as follows;

- "12 Bars From Mars", Lenny White, Streamline
- "The Stumble", John Mayall & the Bluesbreakers, A Hard Road
- "Chasin' the Voodoo", Al Di Meola, Casino
- "Red Lady Too", George Harrison, Wonderwall Music
- "Can't Stand Your Funk", Mahavishnu Orchestra, Visions of the Emerald Beyond
- "Tightrope (For Folon)", Steve Khan, Tightrope
- "Bullet Train", Lee Ritenour, Friendship and the Captain's Journey
- "The Big Ones", Steve Khan, Tightrope
- "Tighten Up", Lee Ritenour, Friendship and the Captain's Journey
- "Where Shadows Meet", Steve Khan, Tightrope
- "Some Punk Funk", Steve Khan, Tightrope
- "Country Boy", Heads Hands & Feet, Heads Hands & Feet
- "Silly Putty", Stanley Clarke, Journey to Love
- "Open Invitation", Santana, Inner Secrets
- "Reggae Groove", The In Crowd, His Majesty is Coming
- "Curly", John Mayall & the Bluesbreakers, Thru The Years
- "Some Down Time", Steve Khan, The Blue Man
- "Jas Moon", Nitty Gritty Dirt Band, American Dream

=== "Top Ten" feature ===
The first top 10 from 1979 called "Now We Are One" was as follows:

- 10. "Shine on You Crazy Diamond" - Pink Floyd - from Wish You Were Here (side one)
- 9. "Starship Trooper" - Yes - Live version from the triple live set Yessongs was played.
- 8. "Supper's Ready" - Genesis - from Foxtrot
- 7. "Stargazer" - Rainbow - from Rainbow Rising
- 6. "Smoke on the Water" - Deep Purple - Live version from Made in Japan was played.
- 5. "Xanadu" - Rush - from Farewell to Kings
- 4. "Layla" - Derek and the Dominoes - from Layla and Other Assorted Love Songs
- 3. "Freebird" - Lynyrd Skynyrd - Live version from One More for the Road played.
- 2. "Child in Time" - Deep Purple - Live version from Made in Japan was played.
- 1. "Stairway to Heaven" - Led Zeppelin - Live version from the soundtrack to The Song Remains the Same played.

The second top 10, "Two's Up - The Listeners' Top Ten" was broadcast on 14 November 1980.

- 10. (-) "Awaken" - Yes - from Going For the One
- 9. (-) "2112" - Rush - Live version from All the World's a Stage was played.
- 8. (6) "Smoke on the Water" - Deep Purple - from Machine Head
- 7. (5) "Xanadu" - Rush - from Farewell to Kings
- 6. (7) "Stargazer" - Rainbow - from Rainbow Rising.
- 5. (10) "Shine on You Crazy Diamond" - Pink Floyd - from Wish You Were Here
- 4. (2) "Child in Time" - Deep Purple - from Deep Purple in Rock
- 3. (3) "Freebird" - Lynyrd Skynyrd - Live version from One More for the Road played.
- 2. (8) "Supper's Ready" - Genesis - from Foxtrot
- 1. (1) "Stairway to Heaven" - Led Zeppelin - Live version from the soundtrack to The Song Remains the Same played.

The third top 10, was broadcast on 13 November 1981.

- 10. (5) "Shine on You Crazy Diamond" - Pink Floyd - from copy of quadrophonic master mixed to stereo
- 9. (8) "Smoke on the Water" - Deep Purple - from Machine Head
- 8 (10) "Awaken" - Yes - from Going For the One
- 7. (4) "Child in Time" - Deep Purple - from Deep Purple in Rock
- 6. (9) "2112" - Rush - from 2112
- 5. (7) "Xanadu" - Rush - from Farewell to Kings
- 4. (6) "Stargazer" - Rainbow - from Rainbow Rising.
- 3. (3) "Freebird" - Lynyrd Skynyrd - from Pronounced 'Lĕh-'nérd 'Skin-'nérd
- 2. (2) "Supper's Ready" - Genesis - from Foxtrot
- 1. (1) "Stairway to Heaven" - Led Zeppelin from Led Zeppelin IV

== Legacy ==
When Tommy Vance left Radio 1 in April 1993, the show was taken over by Claire Sturgess, who had been Radio 1 DJ Simon Bates' secretary prior to her appointment. It remained on Friday nights for a further six months, but it was moved to Sunday afternoons when Matthew Bannister became controller in October 1993, and then to Sunday evenings in May 1994. For its last year, 1995–6, it was broadcast from Glasgow and presented by John Cavanagh. The format of the programme fundamentally changed when Sturgess took over, firmly setting out its stall in the 'contemporary thrash' genre.

Bruce Dickinson of Iron Maiden fronted a new Friday Rock Show on BBC Radio 6 Music between 9 pm and twelve midnight. The show ran for eight years until 28 May 2010.

During 2016, Vintage TV began broadcasting a programme entitled 'The Friday Night Rock Show'. Hosted by Nicky Horne, who hosted similar shows on Capital Radio during the Friday Rock Show's peak period, the show's title was chosen with the intention of paying tribute to the legacies of Tommy Vance and Alan Freeman.

NWOBHM band Saxon paid tribute to the Friday Rock Show in their song "Denim and Leather".

A number of recordings, made when Tommy Vance fronted the Friday Rock Show, were issued on an independent record label Raw Fruit Records in the early 1990s.

== See also ==
- TotalRock
