= Sing Brother Sing =

Studio album by Edgar Broughton Band
- Released: June 1970
- Recorded: July 1969 – February 1970
- Studio: EMI Studios, Abbey Road, London
- Genre: Psychedelic rock, blues rock,proto punk
- Length: 40:04 (LP): 77:11 (CD)
- Label: Harvest
- Producer: Peter Jenner

Edgar Broughton Band chronology
Wasa Wasa (1969)	Sing Brother Sing (1970)	Edgar Broughton Band (1971)

Professional ratings
Review scores
Source	Rating
Allmusic	3.5/5 stars

Sing Brother Sing is the second album by English psychedelic rock band, Edgar Broughton Band. It was originally released as "Harvest SHVL 772" in June 1970. The 2004 CD reissue contains 8 bonus tracks.

There were no A-side singles released from this album, however "Momma's Reward (Keep Them Freak's a Rollin')" and "Officer Dan" were both featured as B-sides to "Out Demons Out" and "Up Yours" respectively. "Out Demons Out" charted as high as number 39 on the UK Official Charts.

== Track listing ==
Edgar Broughton Band - "There's No Vibrations (But Wait)"
25 seconds (of 04:15)

1. "There's No Vibrations, But Wait!" (Robert Edgar Broughton) – 4:10
2. "The Moth" – 5:11
  - "The Moth" (R. E. Broughton) – 1:45
  - "People" (R. E. Broughton, Steve Broughton, Arthur Grant) – 1:00
  - "Peter" (R. E. Broughton) – 2:26
3. "Momma's Reward (Keep Them Freak's a Rollin')" (R. E. Broughton) – 3:05
4. "Refugee" (R. E. Broughton) – 3:29
5. "Officer Dan" (S. Broughton) – 1:36
6. "Old Gopher" (S. Broughton) – 3:50
7. "Aphrodite" (R. E. Broughton) – 4:04
8. "Granma" (R. E. Broughton) – 2:24
9. "Psychopath" – 6:45
  - "The Psychopath" (R. E. Broughton) – 2:17
  - "Is for Butterflies" (S. Broughton, A. Grant) – 4:28
10. "It's Falling Away" (R. E. Broughton) – 5:30

=== 2004 CD reissue bonus tracks ===
1. "Out Demons Out" (Grant, R.E. Broughton, S. Broughton) – 4:47 (Released as A-side of "Harvest HAR 5015")
2. "Rag Doll" (Grant, R.E. Broughton, S. Broughton) – 5:29 (Previously unreleased)
3. "There's No Vibrations, But Wait!" (R. E. Broughton) – 4:12 (Alternate version previously unreleased)
4. "The Locket" (R. E. Broughton) – 5:58 (Previously unreleased)
5. "We've Got the Power" (Grant, R.E. Broughton, S. Broughton) – 6:27 (Previously unreleased)
6. "Up Yours" (R. E. Broughton) – 3:00 (Released as A-side of "Harvest HAR 5021")
7. "Freedom" (R. E. Broughton) – 3:12 (Released as B-side of "Harvest HAR 5032")
8. "Apache Dropout" (Don Van Vliet, Jerry Lordan) – 3:02 (Previously unreleased Peter Jenner version)

== Personnel ==
=== Edgar Broughton Band ===
- Edgar Broughton – vocals, guitar
- Arthur Grant – bass guitar, vocals
- Steve Broughton – drums

=== Technical ===
- Peter Jenner – producer
- Peter Mew – engineer
- Andy "Drop-in" Stephens – assistant engineer
- Neil Richmond – assistant engineer
- Edgar Broughton – artwork (inside drawings)
- Derick Carter – photography
- Lothar Schiffler – photography
