= Edgar Broughton Band =

English rock band

- Also known as: The Edgar Broughton Blues Band
- Origin: Warwick, England
- Genres: Acid rock; blues rock; hard rock; proto punk; psychedelic rock
- Years active: 1968–1976; 1978–1982; 1989; 2006–2010
- Labels: Harvest; NEMS
- Past members: Edgar Broughton; Steve Broughton; Arthur Grant; Victor Unitt; John Thomas; Terry Cottam; Tom Nordon; Richard de Bastion; Pete Tolson; Duncan Bridgeman; Dennis Haynes; Luke Broughton
- Website: edgarbroughton.com

Edgar Broughton Band were a British blues rock band founded in Warwick in 1968, and in their initial form were operative through to 1976. They were a power trio consisting of brothers Edgar (vocals and guitar) and Steve Broughton (drums) with Arthur Grant (bass), who were augmented at various times by a second guitarist and/or keyboardist, significantly Victor Unitt. They released five studio albums, including Sing Brother Sing (UK Albums Chart #18), and six singles, including "Out Demons Out" (UK Singles Chart #39), on the EMI Harvest label and one further studio album for NEMS. The group reformed from 1978 to 1982, initially renamed as The Broughtons, issuing two more studio albums, and again from 2006 to 2010 with Edgar's son Luke for live appearances only.

== Career ==
The band started their career as a blues group under the name of The Edgar Broughton Blues Band, playing to a small following in the region around their hometown of Warwick. However, the band began to lean towards the emerging psychedelic movement, dropping the 'Blues' from their name as well as their music.

In 1968, the Edgar Broughton Band moved to Notting Hill Gate, London, seeking a recording contract and a wider audience, and were picked up by Blackhill Enterprises. Blackhill arranged their first record deal, on EMI's progressive rock label Harvest Records, in December 1968. Their first single was "Evil" backed with "Death of an Electric Citizen", released in June 1969, which was also the first single released by Harvest.

The first single was followed by the Edgar Broughton Band's debut album, Wasa Wasa. Wasa Wasa retained a heavily blues influenced sound that was hard-driven and propelled by Edgar Broughton's gritty vocal style, which was similar to that of Captain Beefheart and Howlin' Wolf. The Broughtons entered into an attempt to capture their live sound on record by organising a performance at Abbey Road on 9 December 1969. Only one track was released at the time: a rendition of "Out Demons Out", an adaptation of The Fugs' song "Exorcising the Demons Out Of the Pentagon", which had become the band's set-closer and anthem. The rest of the recording was lost until its rediscovery and release in a remixed form in 2004 as Keep Them Freaks a Rollin': Live at Abbey Road 1969.

The band's touring attracted some controversy from a series of free concerts at locations such as children's playgrounds, and from a number of cases of civil disorder occurring at their shows. The most notorious incidents were a show in Redcar at which a fight broke out between audience members and led to violent police intervention, and a show in Keele where the audience vandalised the venue using paint given to them by the band. Though the band denied doing anything to incite any of these incidents (in the case of Keele, Edgar Broughton admitted to giving paint to the audience but argued that "we didn't tell them to do anything with it"), several towns banned the group's concerts.

The Edgar Broughton Band kept recording, releasing the live performance of "Out Demons, Out!" as a single (b/w "Momma's Reward (Keep Those Freaks a Rollin')") and following it, in June 1970, with the album Sing Brother Sing. This was accompanied by the single "Up Yours!" (b/w "Officer Dan"), a polemic on the 1970 General Election declaring their intention to drop out. The song featured a string arrangement by David Bedford.

Their next single, "Apache Dropout", combined The Shadows' "Apache" with Captain Beefheart's "Drop Out Boogie". Jerry Lordan, the composer of "Apache", insisted that the title be "Apache Dropout" instead of the original "Drop out Apache". The single reached No. 33 on the UK Singles Chart.

In 1971, the band decided that existence as a power trio was limiting, and asked Victor Unitt, who had been playing meanwhile in The Pretty Things, to rejoin the band. In May, with the new lineup, they released their eponymous third album, which contained "Evening Over Rooftops" (again with strings by Bedford). Edgar Broughton Band contained heavy blues and even country influences.

The album was followed by the release of the double A-side "Hotel Room"/"Call Me A Liar". The single failed to chart, but the album sold well throughout Europe, especially in Germany.

With the success of their third album, the Edgar Broughton Band relocated to Devon to begin recording for their next album, In Side Out. The band then recorded their fifth album, Oora, in 1972; following the release of this album Unitt departed the band.

In 1975 the band signed to NEMS. In the same year, John Thomas joined the band on guitar for the Broughtons' sixth album, Bandages. This featured a softer sound than previous releases. Shortly after the release of Bandages, Thomas left and was replaced by Terry Cottam. In 1976, having recorded the live album Live Hits Harder (which was not released until 1979), the Edgar Broughton Band dissolved.

However, Edgar and Steve Broughton together with Grant regrouped as The Broughtons to release Parlez-Vous English? in 1979, with Tom Nordon and Pete Tolson (ex-the Pretty Things) playing guitar and Richard de Bastion on keyboards. This was the Band's first adventure into a fuller, more orchestral style of heavy rock. Pete Tolson was not retained after the release of the album and was replaced by Thomas for the two years of European touring that followed. Tom Nordon appears again, along with keyboardists Duncan Bridgeman and Dennis Haynes, on Superchip, released in 1982.

After this the band dissolved again; recording no more studio material but touring infrequently throughout the 1980s and 1990s. A mini-tour in 1989 called Draw The Line in 89 included a gig at The Oval in London. The band reformed properly once again in 2006, with Edgar's son Luke joining on keyboards and guitar, after the re-issue of their back catalogue had stimulated new interest in their work. They had a mini tour of England and Germany then completed a European tour in 2007, including an appearance at the German Burg Herzberg Festival. The Edgar Broughton Band disbanded once again in 2010, with Edgar Broughton opting to continue to perform as a solo artist.

Drummer Steve Broughton died on 29 May 2022.

Bass player Arthur Grant died on 31 August 2026.

== Personnel ==
- Edgar Broughton – lead vocals, guitars, keyboards, percussion, bass (1968–1976, 1978–1982, 1989, 2006–2010)
- Steve Broughton – drums, percussion, vocals, guitars, bass, keyboards (1968–1976, 1978–1982, 1989, 2006–2010)
- Arthur Grant – bass, vocals, guitars, keyboards, percussion (1968–1976, 1978–1982, 1989, 2006–2010)
- Victor Unitt – guitars, keyboards, vocals (1971–1973)
- Digger Davies – lead guitar (1975)
- Richard Moore – guitar, vocals (1975) Norway tour
- John Thomas – guitars, bass, vocals (1975–1976, 1979–1981)
- Terry Cottam – guitars, vocals (1976)
- Tom Nordon – guitars, vocals (1978–1982)
- Richard de Bastion – keyboards, vocals (1978–1981)
- Pete Tolson – guitars (1978–1979)
- Duncan Bridgeman – keyboards (1981–1982)
- Dennis Haynes – keyboards, vocals (1981–1982)
- Philip James Manchester – keyboards (1981)
- John Wesley Barker – keyboards (1987)
- Luke Broughton – keyboards, guitars, vocals (2006–2010)
- Andrew Taylor – guitars, vocals (2006–2008)
- Dave Cox – guitars (2008–2010)

== Discography ==
=== Studio albums ===
- Wasa Wasa (1969)
- Sing Brother Sing (1970) – No. 18 UK
- Edgar Broughton Band (1971) – No. 28 UK
- In Side Out (1972)
- Oora (1973)
- Bandages (1976)

The Broughtons

- Parlez-Vous English? (1979)
- Superchip: The Final Silicon Solution? (1982)

=== Compilations ===
- A Bunch of 45s (1975)
- The Legendary Edgar Broughton Band (1984)
- Out Demons Out: The Best of the Edgar Broughton Band (1986)
- As Was: The Best of the Edgar Broughton Band (1988)
- Classic Album and Single Tracks 1969–73 (1992)
- The Very Best of the Edgar Broughton Band – Out Demons Out! (2001)
- Bandages & Chilly Mornings (2006)
- The Harvest Years 1969–1973 (2011). 4-CD boxset.

The Edgar Broughton Band has also appeared on several Harvest Records compilations:

- Picnic – A Breath of Fresh Air (1970)
- The Harvest Bag (1971)
- Harvest Sweeties (1971)
- Harvest Heritage 20 Greats (1977)
- Harvest Festival (1999)

=== Live albums ===
- Live Hits Harder (1979)
- Chilly Morning Mama – Live (1998)
- Demons at the Beeb, Live (2000)
- Keep Them Freaks a Rollin': Live at Abbey Road 1969 (2004)
- Live at Rockpalast 2006 (2008)
- Live at The Monarch (2014)

=== Singles ===
- "Evil" / "Death of an Electric Citizen" (1969)
- "Out Demons Out" / "Momma's Reward" (1970) – No. 39 UK
- "Up Yours!" / "Officer Dan" (1970)
- "Apache Drop Out" / "Freedom" (1971) – No. 33 UK
- "Hotel Room" / "Call Me a Liar" (1971)
- "Gone Blue" / "Someone" / "Mr. Crosby" (1972)

=== DVDs ===
- Live at Rockpalast (2006) – performance by the band for German television.

== See also ==
- List of anarchist musicians
- List of Peel Sessions
