= Superchip: The Final Silicon Solution? =

Studio album by The Broughtons
- Released: 1982
- Studio: Matrix Studios, London (except track 15, The Wand, Battersea)
- Genre: Psychedelic rock, experimental rock, new wave, electronic rock
- Length: 41:30
- Label: Sheet Records
- Producer: The Broughtons

The Broughtons chronology
Parlez-Vous English? (1979)	Superchip: The Final Silicon Solution? (1982)

Superchip: The Final Silicon Solution? is the eighth and final album by The Broughtons (formerly known as Edgar Broughton Band). This album saw them on their own record label, and were credited as The Broughtons as they were called on their previous album, Parlez-Vous English?. This album sees the band with a slightly different sound, with prominent use of synthesisers, but still retaining their original psychedelic rock roots. The album was originally released as "Sheet Records Sheet 2" in 1982. The 2006 CD reissue features one bonus track, which was an electronic dance track created by Edgar Broughton and his son, Luke Broughton.

== Track listing ==
All tracks composed by Edgar Broughton; except where indicated

Side one

1. "Metal Sunday" - 2:15
2. "Superchip - The Final Silicon Solution" - 4:20
3. "Who Only Fade Away" - 2:22
4. "Curtain" (Edgar Broughton, Dennis Haynes) - 2:30
5. "Outrageous Behaviour" (Steve Broughton, Tom Nordon) - 2:53
6. "Not So Funny Farm" (Edgar Broughton, Tom Nordon) - 2:25
7. "Nighthogs" - 2:01

Side two

8. "Innocent Bystanders (Damian and Soola)" - 2:56
9. "Pratfall" (Edgar Broughton, Dennis Haynes) - 3:01
10. "O.D. 47600/1162/111800" (Steve Broughton) - 2:53
11. "Do You Wanna Be Immortal?" - 3:08
12. "Subway Information" - 1:47
13. "The Last Electioneer" (Edgar Broughton, Steve Broughton) - 2:45
14. "Goodbye Ancient Homeland" - 3:32

2006 CD reissue bonus track

15. "The Virus" (Edgar Broughton, Luke Broughton) - 17:13

== Notes ==
The song "Innocent Bystanders (Damian and Soola)" contains a very strong reference to the previous album. In the track are the lyrics:

"He's a second coming Nazi with a fancy little tartsie/He met her at the party on the last L.P."

This is a reference the first track on the previous album where a man meets a girl at a party.

== Personnel ==
Edgar Broughton Band

- Edgar Broughton - lead vocals, guitar, vocoder
- Arthur Grant - bass guitar, vocals
- Steve Broughton - drums, vocals, percussion, marimba
- Duncan Bridgeman - keyboards
- Dennis Haines - keyboards, piano, vocals
- Tom Nordon - guitar, vocals
- Luke Broughton - keyboards (bonus track)
