= Piero Giramonti =

American music business executive

- Born: San Francisco, California
- Education: University of San Francisco
- Occupation: Music Business Executive
- Employer: Caroline Records

Piero Giramonti is an American music business executive and Co-General Manager of Caroline Records. He has held various positions throughout the music industry with labels such as Universal Music Group, Harvest Records, Sony Music Entertainment, EMI Records, and Dangerbird Records.

== Early life and education ==
Giramonti was born and raised in San Francisco, California. He graduated from the University of San Francisco with a bachelor's degree in Applied Economics and English. He moved to New York City upon graduating to pursue a career in the music industry.

== Career ==
Giramonti's career has been spent with various records labels throughout the industry. He began his career with EMI in 1989 as international marketing analyst. He worked with the internal analysis team at EMI and later became the director of international repertoire product manager for U.S. labels in Europe, based in London, U.K. He moved on to Capitol Records, a division of EMI, in 1993. He was a senior director of international marketing, a position he held until 1995 when he became the vice president of international marketing for the Capitol/Palophone labels, EMI Music International, again based in the company's London headquarters. He finished his time at EMI as the senior vice president of worldwide marketing at Virgin Records, a division of EMI.

Giramonti moved on to Epic Records, a division of Sony Music, in 2001, beginning as the senior vice president of worldwide marketing for Epic Records. He was later made senior vice president of video and DVD production for Sony Music North America in 2004, where he was in charge of all visual content for Sony artists, including live concerts, promotional videos, and web content for artists on all Sony Music labels. He moved on to the Warner Bros. record label in 2008, where he spent time as the head of global marketing, overseeing global campaigns for many of the label's artists. Giramonti became president of Dangerbird Records in 2011. As president, he oversaw all six divisions within the company during his 18-month tenure.

Giramonti was selected as the general manager of Harvest Records, a subsidiary of Capitol Records Group, in January 2013. His role was to relaunch the Harvest Records label, re-building the artist roster from scratch. Some of his first signings at Harvest Records include Banks, Death Grips, Glass Animals, TV on the Radio, Young and Sick, Syd Arthur, Arthur Beatrice, and The Preatures.

In December 2015, Giramonti, along with Jacqueline Saturn, was named as General Manager of Caroline Records, the independent division of Capitol Records.

== Personal life ==
Giramonti resides in Los Feliz, California and is married with one son. His wife Lisa is a writer and designer, best known for her blog A Bloomsbury Life, and their residence was featured in a 2012 article in Apartment Therapy. He is a board member and finance chair for the Pablove Foundation as well as a voting member of the National Academy of Recording Arts and Sciences.
