= Andrew King (music manager) =

Music manager

- Occupation: Music manager
- Years active: 1970s-
- Organization: Blackhill Enterprises
- Awards: 2006 BACS Gold Badge Award

Andrew King (born 1948) is a music manager, formerly for Blackhill Enterprises, where he co-managed Pink Floyd and others.

King, Peter Jenner and the original four members of Pink Floyd were partners in Blackhill Enterprises. Under their guidance, Pink Floyd began performing on London's underground music scene, notably at a venue booked by the London Free School in Notting Hill, as well as the notorious "Games For May" concert at London's Queen Elizabeth Hall on 12 May 1967, an event set up by both Jenner and King. After Syd Barrett's departure from Pink Floyd in 1968 Jenner and King ended their relationship with Pink Floyd and continued as managers for Barrett and other British rock bands.

Acts he has managed since the dissolution of Blackhill in the early 1980s include Ian Dury.

He co-founded the internet broadcaster TotalRock with hard rock and heavy metal promoting deejay Tommy Vance and Vance's former Radio 1 producer Tony Wilson.

He is winner of 2006 BACS Gold Badge Award and board member for the Performing Rights Society.
