= Harvest Records =

British record label

- Parent company: Universal Music Group (trademark and post-2013/part of pre-2013 catalogs) Warner Music Group (most of pre-2013 catalog) Previously EMI (1969–1979; 1996–2012) Thorn EMI (1979–1996)
- Founded: 1969; 57 years ago
- Founder: Malcolm Jones; Norman Smith
- Status: Active
- Distributors: Interscope Capitol Labels Group (United States); Virgin Music Group (United Kingdom); Universal Music Group (International); Columbia/Sony Music (Pink Floyd catalog)
- Genre: Progressive rock; indie; experimental hip hop
- Country of origin: United Kingdom
- Location: Hollywood, Los Angeles, California
- Official website: harvestrecords.com

Harvest Records is a British-American record label belonging to Capitol Music Group, originally created by EMI in 1969.

== History ==
Harvest Records was created by EMI in 1969 to market progressive rock music, and to compete with Philips' Vertigo and Decca's Deram labels, and the independent Island label. (All 3 of those labels, as well as Harvest itself, are now owned by Universal Music Group). Harvest was initially under the direction of Malcolm Jones, and was distributed in North America by EMI's US affiliate, Capitol Records. They were the European licensee for the American label Blue Thumb Records from 1969 to 1971.

In the 1970s, the label primarily released progressive rock recordings by British rock music acts including Pink Floyd, Syd Barrett, Kevin Ayers, The Move, Roy Wood, Michael Chapman, Barclay James Harvest, Bill Nelson's avant garde-prog act Be Bop Deluxe and heavy rock band, Deep Purple. Most acts on the Harvest roster were British; two notable exceptions were Australian progressive band Spectrum (whose first two LPs were issued on Harvest) and Spectrum's successor Ariel, whose first two LPs also came out on the label. The Danish musician Sebastian had three albums released in Denmark on the Harvest label between 1972 and 1974.

The focus of the label changed slightly as the 1970s drew to a close with the release of The Roxy London WC2 (Jan – Apr 77); produced by Mike Thorne, this was a compilation album of unknown punk rock bands, a huge success that allowed EMI to review their attitude towards punk. The label later released music by post-punk groups Wire, Australian proto punk garage rock band the Saints and the Banned. New wave artist Thomas Dolby released his debut album and fellow new wave-new romantic act Duran Duran released its first two albums on the label in North America. Australian soft rock band Little River Band and English heavy metal band Iron Maiden's first three albums were also released in the US by the label. Pink Floyd switched to Columbia Records in the US after the release of The Dark Side of the Moon in 1973.

In the United States, Capitol initially treated Harvest as a separate label that they expected big sales from. After only a few issues, they had few sales to show for their effort and consequently only issued a few releases and numbered them within their standard Capitol LP series (mostly using Harvest for Pink Floyd releases). After this initial short-lived series, Capitol passed on most of the UK Harvest artists.

In 1975, a reissue sub-label was launched called Harvest Heritage. This new label largely compiled material that had been previously released on Harvest from 1969 onward. However, Harvest Heritage also reissued music from late 1960s EMI bands that had never recorded for the label, such as the Gods (most of whom went on to form Uriah Heep), Love Sculpture (a Welsh blues rock band), and early Steve Howe band, Tomorrow. Heritage also occasionally released new music, such as Four Rock 'n' Roll Legends, a recording of a 1977 concert by rockabilly veterans Charlie Feathers, Buddy Knox, Jack Scott and Warren Smith.

Most of Harvest's European back catalogue (including Pink Floyd [see exception below], Deep Purple [pre-1971], Duran Duran, and Iron Maiden) were divested by Universal Music after its takeover of EMI, as part of the Parlophone Label Group. Warner Music Group would buy that part of the catalog in February 2013. Rights to the Australian Harvest recordings, including those from the Saints and Little River Band, were ceded to Universal's EMI Recorded Music Australia imprint.

Sony Music controls the Pink Floyd catalog through Columbia Records since its full acquisition in 2024. From 2016 to 2024, the former members licensed the catalog for manufacture and distribution by Warner Music Group for the UK and European markets and by Sony Music Entertainment for North America and the rest of the world through their company named Pink Floyd Records.

Capitol Music Group announced its relaunch of the label on 25 February 2013, with former Warner Bros. Records and Dangerbird Records executive Piero Giramonti at the helm. Giramonti is tasked with running the label as an independent label, with the support of Capitol Music Group and Caroline Distribution for distribution, radio promotion and licensing. As of 2013, the Harvest roster consists of TV on the Radio, Arthur Beatrice, Babes, Death Grips, the Olms, Together Pangea, White Lies and Young & Sick.

On 15 January 2014, it was announced that Morrissey and Charlotte OC had signed to Harvest Records.

== Discography ==
1969

- Deep Purple – The Book of Taliesyn
- Pete Brown and His Battered Ornaments – A Meal You Can Shake Hands with in the Dark
- Panama Limited Jug Band – Panama Limited Jug Band
- Shirley and Dolly Collins – Anthems in Eden
- Michael Chapman – Rainmaker
- Third Ear Band – Alchemy
- Edgar Broughton Band – Wasa Wasa
- The Battered Ornaments – Mantle-Piece
- Deep Purple – Deep Purple
- Forest – Forest
- Tea & Symphony – An Asylum for the Musically Insane
- Bakerloo – Bakerloo
- Kevin Ayers – Joy of a Toy
- Pink Floyd – Ummagumma

1970

- Various Artists – Picnic – A Breath of Fresh Air (Sampler)
- Michael Chapman – Fully Qualified Survivor
- Syd Barrett – The Madcap Laughs
- Roy Harper – Flat Baroque and Berserk
- Ron Geesin & Roger Waters - Music from The Body
- Deep Purple – Concerto for Group and Orchestra
- Pete Brown & Piblokto! – Things May Come and Things May Go but the Art School Dance Goes on Forever
- Greatest Show on Earth – Horizons
- Barclay James Harvest – Barclay James Harvest
- Shirley and Dolly Collins – Love, Death and the Lady
- Edgar Broughton Band – Sing Brother Sing
- Third Ear Band – Third Ear Band
- The Pretty Things – Parachute
- Quatermass – Quatermass
- Kevin Ayers and the Whole World – Shooting at the Moon
- Deep Purple – Deep Purple in Rock
- Panama Limited – Indian Summer
- Pink Floyd – Atom Heart Mother
- Syd Barrett – Barrett
- Pete Brown & Piblokto! – Thousands on a Raft
- The Greatest Show on Earth – The Going's Easy
- Love – Out Here
- Forest – Full Circle
- Tea & Symphony – Jo Sago A Play on Music
- Michael Chapman – Window
- Dave Mason – Alone Together
- Chris Spedding- Backwood Progression

1971

- Various Artists - The Harvest Bag (Special Budget Sampler)
- Love – False Start
- Barclay James Harvest – Once Again
- Roy Harper – Stormcock
- The Grease Band – The Grease Band
- Edgar Broughton Band – Edgar Broughton Band
- East of Eden – East of Eden
- The Move - Message from the Country
- Deep Purple – Fireball
- Barclay James Harvest – Barclay James Harvest & Other Short Stories
- Pink Floyd – Meddle
- East of Eden – New Leaf
- Electric Light Orchestra – The Electric Light Orchestra
- Michael Chapman – Wrecked Again
- Southern Comfort – Southern Comfort

1972

- Babe Ruth - First Base
- Janus - Gravedigger
- Kevin Ayers – Whatevershebringswesing
- Pink Floyd – Obscured by Clouds
- Sebastian – Den store flugt
- Spontaneous Combustion – Spontaneous Combustion
- Edgar Broughton Band – Inside Out
- Spontaneous Combustion – Triad
- Barclay James Harvest – Baby James Harvest
- Carson - Blown

1973

- Kayak – See See the Sun
- Roy Wood – Boulders
- Pink Floyd – The Dark Side of the Moon
- Electric Light Orchestra – ELO 2
- Kevin Ayers – Bananamour
- Roy Harper – Lifemask
- Mark-Almond – Rising
- Edgar Broughton Band – Oora
- Pink Floyd – Atom Heart Mother (Quadrophonic release)
- Barclay James Harvest – Once Again (Quadrophonic release)
- Ariel – A Strange Fantastic Dream
- Sadistic Mika Band – Sadistic Mika Band
- Sebastian – Over havet under himlen
- Corben Simpson – Get Up With The Sun HSD 1030
- Wizzard – Wizzard Brew

1974

- Babe Ruth – Amar Caballero
- Be-Bop Deluxe – Axe Victim
- Syd Barrett – Syd Barrett (Double reissue of The Madcap Laughs and Barrett)
- Pink Floyd – A Nice Pair (Double reissue of The Piper at the Gates of Dawn and A Saucerful of Secrets)
- Roy Harper – Flashes from the Archives of Oblivion
- Sadistic Mika Band – Black Ship
- Sebastian – Blød lykke
- Triumvirat – Illusions on a Double Dimple
- Kayak – Kayak II
- Wizzard – See My Baby Jive (compilation)
- The Move – California Man (compilation)
- Electric Light Orchestra – Showdown (compilation)
- The Frenchies - Lola Cola

1975

- Pink Floyd – Wish You Were Here (Europe only)
- Roy Harper – HQ
- Be-Bop Deluxe – Futurama
- Ariel – Rock 'n' Roll Scars
- Edgar Broughton Band – A Bunch of 45s (Harvest Heritage compilation)
- Quatermass – Quatermass (Harvest Heritage reissue)
- Climax Blues Band – 1969 – 1972 (Harvest Heritage compilation)
- Greatest Show on Earth – Greatest Show on Earth (Harvest Heritage compilation)
- The Pretty Things – S.F. Sorrow/Parachute (Harvest Heritage double reissue)
- Kevin Ayers – Joy of a Toy/Shooting at the Moon - (Harvest Heritage double reissue)
- Maneige – First Album and Les Porches

1976

- Kevin Ayers – Odd Ditties (compilation)
- Be-Bop Deluxe – Sunburst Finish
- Third Ear Band – Experiences
- Shirley Collins – Amaranth
- Southern Comfort – Distilled
- Tomorrow – Tomorrow (reissue)
- Little River Band – Little River Band (US and Canada)
- The Gods – The Gods
- Be-Bop Deluxe – Modern Music
- Ashley Hutchings – Son of Morris On
- Roy Wood – The Roy Wood Story (Double reissue)

1977

- The Albion Dance Band – The Prospect Before Us
- Pink Floyd – Animals (Europe only)
- Be-Bop Deluxe – Live! In the Air Age
- Barclay James Harvest – The Best of Barclay James Harvest
- Electric Light Orchestra – The Light Shines On
- Deep Purple – Shades of Deep Purple (Reissue)
- Little River Band – Diamantina Cocktail (US and Canada only)
- Pete Brown & Piblokto!/Battered Ornaments – My Last Band
- John Lees – A Major Fancy
- Babe Ruth – The Best of Babe Ruth
- Various Artists – Harvest Heritage 20 Greats (Sampler album)
- Roy Wood – Boulders (Reissue)
- The Pretty Things – Singles A's & B's
- Soft Machine – Triple Echo
- Wire – Pink Flag

1978

- The Albion Band – Rise Up Like the Sun
- Be-Bop Deluxe – Drastic Plastic
- David Gilmour – David Gilmour (Europe only)
- Rick Wright – Wet Dream (Europe only)
- Jack Scott/Charlie Feathers/Buddy Knox/Warren Smith – Four Rock 'n' Roll Legends Recorded in London
- Roy Harper – 1970 – 1975
- Little River Band – Sleeper Catcher (US and Canada only)
- Deep Purple – The Deep Purple Singles A's and B's
- Be-Bop Deluxe – The Best of and the Rest of Be-Bop Deluxe
- Can – Out of Reach
- Barclay James Harvest – The Best of Barclay James Harvest Volume 2
- Wire – Chairs Missing
- Kate Bush - The Kick Inside (US and Canada only)
- Soft Machine - Alive & Well: Recorded in Paris

1979

- Morrissey–Mullen – Cape Wrath
- Electric Light Orchestra – The Light Shines On Vol 2
- Various Artists – The Rare Stuff
- Red Noise Sound-on-Sound
- The Move – Shines On
- Eberhard Schoener – Video Flashback
- Pink Floyd – The Wall (Europe only)
- Kate Bush - Lionheart (Canada only)
- Scorpions – Lovedrive SHSP 4097
- Wire – 154
- The Monks - Bad Habits (Canada only)

1980

- Iron Maiden – Iron Maiden (US and Canada only)
- Roy Harper – The Unknown Soldier
- Dave Edmunds & Love Sculpture – Singles A's & B's
- Deep Purple – Deep Purple in Concert
- Scorpions – Animal Magnetism SHSP 4113
- Kate Bush - Never for Ever (Canada only)

1981

- Be-Bop Deluxe – Singles A's & B's
- Bowers-Ducharme – Bowers-Ducharme (Canada only)
- Nick Mason's Fictitious Sports (Europe only)
- Iron Maiden – Killers (US and Canada only)
- Duran Duran – Duran Duran (US and Canada only)
- Herman Rarebell Nip in the bud
- Pink Floyd – A Collection of Great Dance Songs (Europe only)
- Barclay James Harvest – The Best of Barclay James Harvest Volume 3

1982

- Scorpions – Blackout (the world outside the US and Canada)
- Duran Duran – Rio (US and Canada only)
- Iron Maiden – The Number of the Beast (US and Canada only)
- Thomas Dolby - Blinded by Science
- Thomas Dolby - The Golden Age of Wireless
- Jon Lord - Before I Forget

1983

- Pink Floyd – The Final Cut (Europe only)

1984

- David Gilmour – About Face (re-released by EMI in 2006 and again by Parlophone in 2014) (Europe only)
- Scorpions - Love at First Sting (the world outside the US and Canada)
- Pallas – The Sentinel (outside North America)
- Roger Waters – The Pros and Cons of Hitch Hiking
- Zee – Identity

1985

- Scorpions - World Wide Live (the world outside the US and Canada)
- Nick Mason and Rick Fenn – Profiles (Europe only)

1986

- Pallas – The Wedge

1988

- Scorpions - Savage Amusement (the world outside the US and Canada)
- Syd Barrett – Opel

1989

- Jeff Lynne – A Message from the Country 1968-1973
- Kevin Ayers – Banana Productions: The Best Of

1990s

- 1990 – Be-Bop Deluxe – Raiding the Divine Archive
- 1991 – The Beyond – Crawl
- 1992 – Scorpions – Still Loving You (the world outside North America)
- 1994 – Motorpsycho – Timothy's Monster' (3-album box set)
- 1999 – Various Artists – Harvest Festival (5-CD book)
- 1999 – Dark Star – Twenty Twenty Sound

2000s

- 2001 – Syd Barrett – Wouldn't You Miss Me
- 2005 – Patrick Duff – Luxury Problems
- 2005 – Amorphous Androgynous – Alice in Ultraland
- 2005 – The Move – Message from the Country
- 2005 – Various Artists – Harvest Showdown Electric Light Orchestra/The Move/Roy Wood/Wizzard
- 2006 – Various Artists – It Wasn't My Idea to Dance - A Harvest Sampler
- 2006 – Pete Brown – Living Life Backwards – The Best of Pete Brown
- 2007 – Various Artists – A Breath of Fresh Air – A Harvest Records Anthology / 1969 – 1974
- 2008 – Kevin Ayers – Songs for Insane Times: Anthology 1969 – 1980

2011

- Be-Bop Deluxe – Futurist Manifesto (2011) 5-CD set, fifth disc comprises previously unreleased material

2012

- Red Noise Sound-on-Sound Remastered and expanded
- Death Grips - No Love Deep Web

2013

- The Olms - "The Olms"
- White Lies - Big TV
- D. A. Wallach - "Glowing" (Music video directed by Wolf Haley)
- Beady Eye - BE (North America)
- Death Grips - Government Plates

2014

- Kasabian - 48:13
- Morrissey - World Peace Is None Of Your Business
- Syd Arthur - Sound Mirror (US & UK Release)
- Babes - "Die" (single)
- Babes - Untitled EP
- Banks - Goddess
- TV On The Radio - Seeds

2015

- Death Grips - The Powers That B
- Best Coast - California Nights
- Wynter Gordon - Five Needle (EP)
- The Libertines - Anthems for Doomed Youth (US release)
- The Greeting Committee - It's Not All That Bad

2016

- Harriet - "American Appetite"
- Death Grips - Bottomless Pit
- Banks - The Altar

2017

- Day Wave - The Days We Had

2018

- Death Grips - Year of the Snitch

2019

- Banks - III

2021

- Lauren Auder - 5 Songs for the Dysphoric (EP)

2022

- Grace Ives - Janky Star
