= Peter Jenner =

British music manager and record producer (born 1943)

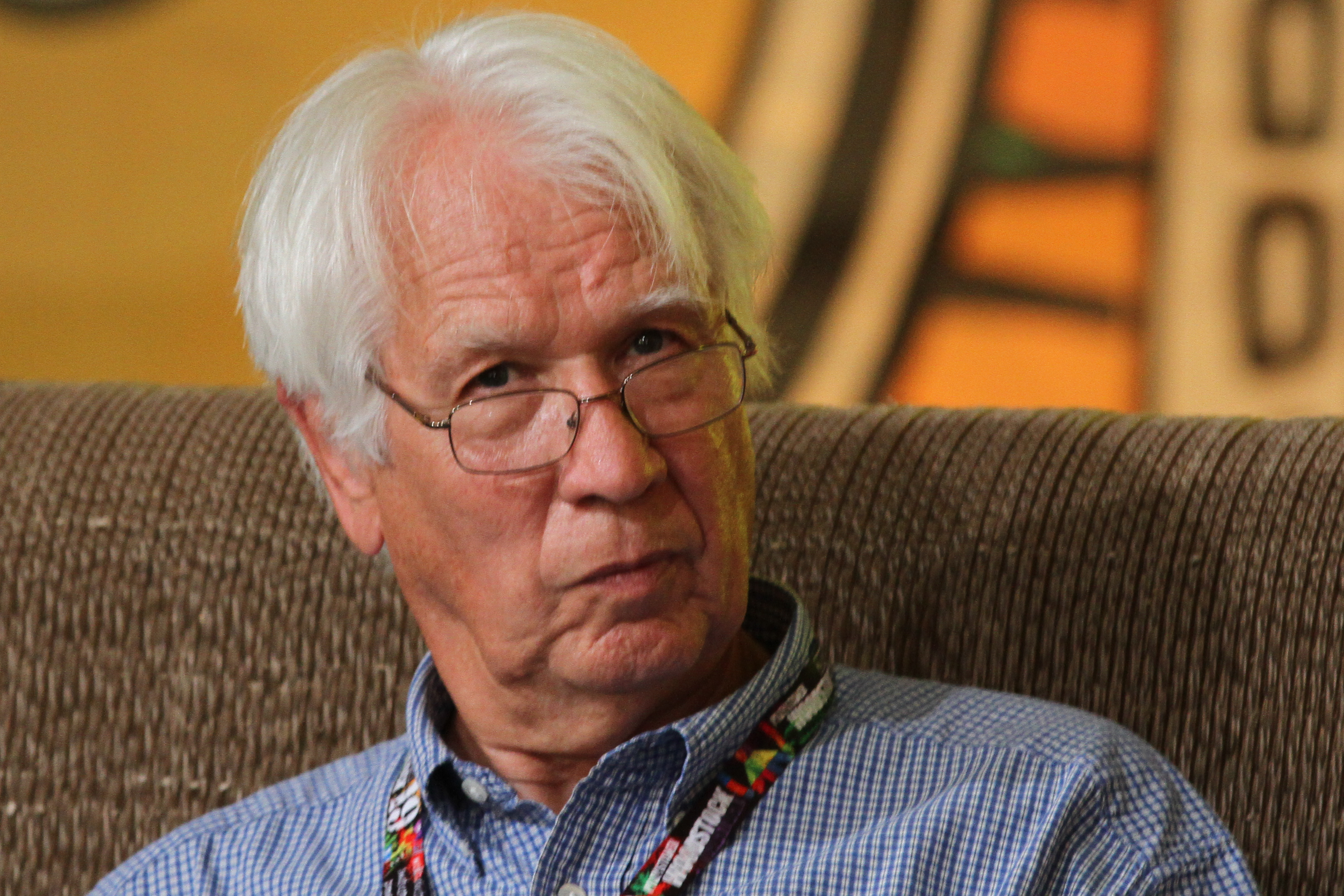
- 2013 Woodstock, by Ralf Lotys
- Born: Peter Julian Jenner; 3 March 1943 (age 83); Bath, Somerset, England
- Education: Sidney Sussex College, Cambridge
- Occupations: Music manager; Record producer
- Organizations: Blackhill Enterprises; Sincere Management

Peter Julian Jenner (born 3 March 1943) is a British music manager and a record producer. Jenner, Andrew King and the original four members of Pink Floyd were partners in Blackhill Enterprises.

== Early career ==
Peter Jenner is the son of William Jack Jenner, a vicar, and grandson of British Labour Party Politician Frank Wise. Jenner was educated at Westminster School and Sidney Sussex College, Cambridge, where he attained a first-class honours degree in Economics in 1963, aged 20. Appointed as a lecturer at the London School of Economics, after four years he left to manage the then up-and-coming band Pink Floyd. Jenner put on a number of free concerts in London's Hyde Park which included the 1969 concert by The Rolling Stones. He was asked to manage David Bowie, but turned the offer down.

== London Free School and Notting Hill Fayre ==
John "Hoppy" Hopkins, Peter Jenner, Joe Boyd, Ron Atkins, Barry Miles, Michael de Freitas, John Michell, Julie Felix, Michael Horovitz and Nigel Waymouth and others, met at Hoppy's flat in Queensway, London, twice a month. Inspired by the American Free Universities and the Victorian Jewish Free School in Spitalfields, the group wanted to offer a wide range of classes including photography, music, and mental health. Everyone involved had had some form of further education but felt that it wasn't what it set out to be and wasn't very good. So they set out to create a school that did the opposite. They set up the first meeting on 8 March 1966 and 120 people turned up, 50 expressing an interest in lessons. Over the spring and summer months, classes began. They were not official classes, more just people sitting and talking and smoking. By the autumn, things picked up and there were too many people wanting to attend. Rhaune Laslett offered the free school the use of her house for classes. The Free School needed funding, so Jenner set up a Pink Floyd at All Saints Hall in September. It was not a big hall: it could not hold more than 300 people. This was when Pink Floyd started the course to fame. By Christmas, the events were getting centre-page spreads in the Melody Maker.

Laslett later went on to work with the London Free School to set up the first Notting Hill Fayre. Talk of a carnival-style celebration floated around a few discussions about how to promote the Free School and the idea bloomed from there. Michael De Frietas suggested moving an indoor Trinidadian celebration to the streets around Portobello Road. Once everything was organised and in place, two musicians, Dave Tomlin and Joe Gannon led a small procession down Portobello Road to promote the fayre. Initially intended as a children's event, the fayre began with a small pageant procession starting at Tavistock Square and passing through Ladbroke Grove, Notting Hill Gate, Westbourne Grove, and Acklam Road.

== Management career ==
Alongside childhood friend and music producer Andrew King, Jenner co-founded Blackhill Enterprises, in 1966, where they produced songs and albums for Pink Floyd, T. Rex, Ian Dury, Roy Harper, The Clash, The Disposable Heroes of Hiphoprisy, Robyn Hitchcock, Baaba Maal, Sarah Jane Morris, Denzil, Susheela Raman and Eddi Reader (Fairground Attraction). Jenner has also managed Billy Bragg for more than 30 years and still acts as his advisor/consultant.. While managing Ian Dury and the Blockheads, Jenner was the co-producer of the albums New Boots and Panties and Do It Yourself.

=== Blackhill Enterprises ===
Jenner set up Blackhill Enterprises with King and his wife, Sumi Nishihata (1935–2006), in 1966 after discovering Pink Floyd. Blackhill Enterprises set up Pink Floyd's Games for May concert, the first pop concert in South Bank, in 1967. With support from MPs, such as Ben Whittaker, Blackhill was able to set up the first Hyde Park Free Festival. The concerts were held in June, July and August in 1968. 120,000 people gathered in the park to see artists such as Pink Floyd, Roy Harper, and Tyrannosaurus Rex. About the festival, Jenner said, "The main reason we do them is because we feel a great interest in the importance of pop music in Britain". The free festivals continued for another eight years. Blackhill Enterprises disintegrated in 1981.

Jenner was also a contributor to the Blackhill Bullshit, a magazine which was distributed to concert promoters and agents in order publicise artists. The first issues were edited by Hugh Nolan, but it was taken over by Adrian Boot, who also designed the artwork layout. Jenner is featured in an interview with Edgar and Steve Broughton in the magazine's sixth issue.

=== Pink Floyd ===
Pink Floyd, then an unknown band, began to receive paid bookings including at the Marquee Club in March 1966 where they were watched by Jenner. The band played mostly rhythm and blues songs, but Jenner was impressed with the strange acoustic effects that Barrett and Wright created during their performance. Jenner traced Waters and Mason to their flat, and with his business partner and friend Andrew King was subsequently invited to become their manager. Although the pair had little experience of the music industry, they shared an appreciation of music, as well as a childhood history. Using inherited money they set up Blackhill Enterprises and purchased new instruments for the band, as well as equipment which included a Selmer PA system. Under their guidance, Pink Floyd began performing on London's underground music scene, notably at a venue booked by the London Free School in Notting Hill, as well as the notorious "Games For May" concert at London's Queen Elizabeth Hall on 12 May 1967, an event set up by both Jenner and King. Jenner and King's diverse array of social connections were meritorious, gaining the band important coverage in The Financial Times and The Sunday Times. Jenner's voice can be heard at the start of Pink Floyd's 1967 "Astronomy Domine", the opening track on the album The Piper at the Gates of Dawn (UK edition).

As the relationship between Syd Barrett and the other three members of Pink Floyd deteriorated, Jenner and King, believing Barrett to be the principal songwriter and the main creative force in the band, chose to continue to manage Barrett's career, while permitting Waters, Mason, Wright, and new addition Gilmour, to continue to operate under the name Pink Floyd. Jenner and King parted company with Pink Floyd and continued as the managers of Barrett and other British rock bands.

=== Sincere Management ===
After Blackhill Enterprises disintegrated in the early 1980s, Jenner and Sumi set up Sincere Management, located on Bravington Road in West Kilburn, which managed a range of artists including Billy Bragg, Eddi Reader, Sarah Jane Morris, Robyn Hitchcock, The Unbending Trees, Sid Griffin and Outside Royalty.

== Other activity ==
Jenner was an executive of the International Music Manager's Forum until 2006, and a director of the UK Music Managers' Forum. Jenner was involved in the Featured Artists Coalition.

In August 2010, he wrote for the Labour Uncut website, during the guest editorship of Tom Watson MP.

== On copyright ==
Jenner has been a regular commentator on copyright and the music industry. Amongst others he was interviewed on copyright by NetzpolitikTV and for the documentary Good Copy Bad Copy. An extensive interview with the Future of Music Coalition about copyright and technology is available as a podcast as part of the Coalition's podcast series. In this, he explains that new technology is the future of the music industry and that 'copyright is going to die because no-one will enforce it'.

Jenner has been critical of digital rights management (DRM). He has argued that in response to Napster the music industry invested heavily in DRM. He argues that the music industry "persuaded themselves they could follow these files around and every time they were used a small amount of money would come magically to the companies. And then everything would be fantastic. But of course it did not work out that way because the public hates DRM as it stops them doing things they want to do in the digital domain." Jenner has long argued that governments should impose blanket licences for music online to counter copyright infringement, with a fee being collected by internet service providers (ISPs). He reasoned that "If we can get £1 a month from every person in this island for music, that would give us £60 million a month," which according to Jenner comes close to the revenues of the music industry in the UK.

In 2006, Jenner wrote a paper, and gave a conference, called 'Beyond the Soundbytes', where he proposed an 'access to music charge', which is a compensation for artists, while removing any attraction and use of unauthorised digital music sites.

More recently, Jenner has been involved in efforts to build a music rights registry at European Union level, and has argued for an international music registry, supported by the World Intellectual Property Organization (WIPO). According to Jenner, "we don't know who owns what and where" and this holds back the copyright licensing of music online. Jenner now wants to see a wide variety of online music services and business models being licensed, through a mixture of blanket licences and individual licences. Jenner argues that copyright, and intellectual property more generally, is a system which ensures that people get paid. He argues that "Intellectual property is not something like a chair."
