= A Flock of Seagulls discography =

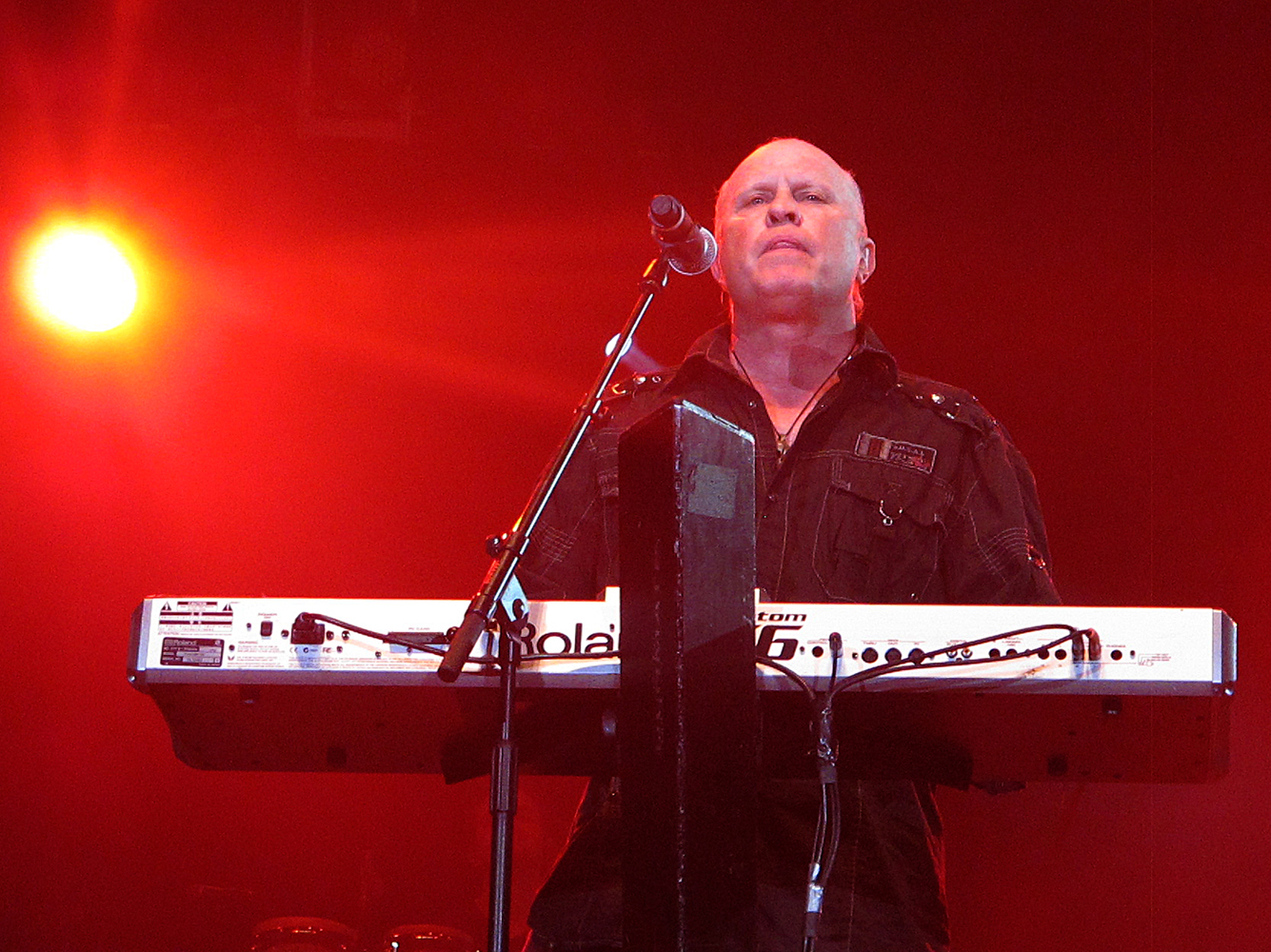
- Studio albums: 8
- Extended plays: 1
- Live albums: 1
- Compilation albums: 16
- Singles: 25
- Video albums: 5
- Music videos: 14
- Remix albums: 1

The following is a complete list of recordings by the English new wave band A Flock of Seagulls.

== Albums ==
=== Studio albums ===
Title	Album details	Peak chart positions								Certifications
Title	Album details	UK	AUS	CAN	GER	NL	NZ	SWE	US	Certifications
A Flock of Seagulls	Released: 9 April 1982; Label: Jive, Arista; Formats: LP, MC, 8-track	32	19	5	25	—	6	32	10	UK: Silver; CAN: Platinum; NZ: Gold; US: Gold
Listen	Released: 29 April 1983; Label: Jive, Arista; Formats: LP, MC, 8-track	16	90	12	14	47	5	44	16	CAN: Gold
The Story of a Young Heart	Released: 20 August 1984; Label: Jive, Arista; Formats: CD, LP, MC	30	—	32	31	17	32	—	66	
Dream Come True	Released: 10 March 1986; Label: Jive, Arista; Formats: LP, MC	—	—	—	—	—	—	—	—	
The Light at the End of the World	Released: 14 March 1995; Label: Big Shot; Formats: CD, MC	—	—	—	—	—	—	—	—	
Some Dreams	Released: 13 December 2024; Label: August Day; Formats: CD, digital download	—	—	—	—	—	—	—	—	
"—" denotes releases that did not chart or were not released in that territory.

=== Orchestral albums ===
Title	Album details	Peak chart positions		Certifications
Title	Album details	UK Indie	US Classical	Certifications
Ascension (with the Prague Philharmonic Orchestra)	Released: 6 July 2018; Label: August Day; Formats: CD, digital download	29	8	
String Theory (with the Slovenian Symphonic Film Orchestra)	Released: 20 August 2021; Label: August Day; Formats: CD, digital download	—	—	
"—" denotes releases that did not chart or were not released in that territory.

=== Live albums ===
Title	Album details
I Ran	Released: 1999; Label: Brilliant; Formats: CD

=== Remix albums ===
Title	Album details
Greatest Hits Remixed	Released: 14 September 1999; Label: Cleopatra; Formats: CD

=== Compilation albums ===
Title	Album details
The Singles	Released: 17 June 1985; Label: Jive; Formats: 10x7"; Also released as 10x12" as The 12" Singles, 8 July 1985
The Best of A Flock of Seagulls	Released: 13 October 1986; Label: Jive; Formats: CD, LP, MC
Telecommunications	Released: 5 October 1992; Label: Old Gold; Formats: CD
The Best Of	Released: 14 June 1993; Label: Music Club; Formats: CD, MC
20 Classics of the '80s	Released: 13 March 1995; Label: Emporio; Formats: CD, MC
Wishing	Released: 23 September 1996; Label: Disky; Formats: CD
Platinum & Gold Collection	Released: 19 August 2003; Label: Jive/BMG Heritage; Formats: CD
Essential New Wave	Released: 15 October 2003; Label: BMG; Formats: CD, MC
I Ran: The Best of A Flock of Seagulls	Released: 17 February 2004; Label: Cleopatra, Anagram; Formats: CD; Consists of re-recordings
A Flock of Seagulls	Released: 14 March 2006; Label: Jive/Legacy/VH1 Classic; Formats: CD
Playlist: The Very Best of A Flock of Seagulls	Released: 19 August 2008; Label: Legacy; Formats: CD, digital download
Wishing: The Very Best	Released: 25 May 2015; Label: Music Club Deluxe; Formats: 2xCD, digital download
Remixes & Rarities	Released: 24 March 2017; Label: Cherry Pop; Formats: 2xCD
Aurora Borealis – The Greatest Hits	Released: 5 July 2018; Label: August Day; Formats: digital download; Consists of re-recordings
Inflight – The Extended Essentials	Released: 12 July 2019; Label: August Day; Formats: CD, digital download; Consists of re-recordings
I Ran (So Far Away)	Released: 17 September 2021; Label: Cleopatra; Formats: LP

== EPs ==
Title	EP details
Modern Love Is Automatic	Released: 13 November 1981; Label: Jive; Formats: 7", 12"

== Singles ==
Title	Year	Peak chart positions											Certifications	Album
Title	Year	UK	UK Indie	AUS	CAN	GER	IRE	NL	NZ	US	US Dance	US Main	Certifications	Album
"(It's Not Me) Talking"	1981	—	45	—	—	—	—	—	—	—	—	—		Non-album single
"Telecommunication"	1981	—	—	—	—	—	—	—	—	—	19	—		A Flock of Seagulls
"Modern Love Is Automatic"	1982	—	—	—	—	—	—	—	—	—	19	—		A Flock of Seagulls
"I Ran (So Far Away)"	1982	43	—	1	26	31	—	46	7	9	8	3	UK: Gold; AUS: Gold	A Flock of Seagulls
"Space Age Love Song"	1982	34	—	68	—	—	—	—	31	30	—	59		A Flock of Seagulls
"Wishing (If I Had a Photograph of You)"	1982	10	—	46	10	37	6	44	33	26	62	3	UK: Silver	Listen
"(It's Not Me) Talking" (remix)	1983	—	22	—	—	—	—	—	—	—	—	—		Non-album single
"Nightmares"	1983	53	—	—	—	—	—	—	—	—	62	—		Listen
"Transfer Affection"	1983	38	—	—	—	—	22	—	43	—	—	—		Listen
"(It's Not Me) Talking" (re-recording)	1983	78	—	—	—	—	—	—	—	—	—	—		Listen
"The More You Live, the More You Love"	1984	26	—	—	45	37	—	16	32	56	52	10		The Story of a Young Heart
"Never Again (The Dancer)"	1984	—	—	—	—	—	—	—	—	—	—	—		The Story of a Young Heart
"Remember David" (Continental Europe-only release)	1985	—	—	—	—	—	—	—	—	—	—	—		The Story of a Young Heart
"Who's That Girl (She's Got It)"	1985	66	—	—	—	—	—	—	—	—	—	—		Dream Come True
"Heartbeat Like a Drum"	1986	—	—	—	—	—	—	—	—	—	—	—		Dream Come True
"Magic" (US-only release)	1989	—	—	—	—	—	—	—	—	—	—	—		The Light at the End of the World
"Burnin' Up" (US-only release)	1995	—	—	—	—	—	—	—	—	—	—	—		The Light at the End of the World
"Rainfall" (US-only release)	1996	—	—	—	—	—	—	—	—	—	—	—		The Light at the End of the World
"I Ran" (Die Krupps remix; US-only release)	1999	—	—	—	—	—	—	—	—	—	—	—		Greatest Hits Remixed
"I Ran (So Far Away)" (vs the Angry Kids; US-only release)	2007	—	—	—	—	—	—	—	—	—	—	—		Non-album single
"Space Age Love Song" (with the Prague Philharmonic Orchestra)	2018	—	—	—	—	—	—	—	—	—	—	—		Ascension
"I Ran (So Far Away)" (with the Prague Philharmonic Orchestra)	2018	—	—	—	—	—	—	—	—	—	—	—		Ascension
"Wishing (If I Had a Photograph of You)"	2019	—	—	—	—	—	—	—	—	—	—	—		Inflight – The Extended Essentials
"Say You Love Me" (with the Slovenian Symphonic Film Orchestra)	2021	—	—	—	—	—	—	—	—	—	—	—		String Theory
"Messages" (with the Slovenian Symphonic Film Orchestra)	2022	—	—	—	—	—	—	—	—	—	—	—		String Theory
"—" denotes releases that did not chart or were not released in that territory.

=== Other appearances ===
Title	Year	Peak chart positions	Album
Title	Year	US Dance	Album
"This Used to Be My Playground"	2000	—	Virgin Voices: A Tribute to Madonna – Volume Two
"Ageless Prince" (with Jimmy D. Robinson)	2017	25	Non-album singles
"Pedro" (with Jimmy D. Robinson)	2017	33	Non-album singles
"Things Change" (with Jimmy D. Robinson)	2017	—	Non-album singles
"Lips Like Sugar" (with David Hasselhoff)	2019	—	Open Your Eyes
"Over the Moon" (remix of the Robert Calvert song)	2020	—	Over the Moon Remixes
"—" denotes releases that did not chart or were not released in that territory.

== Videos ==
=== Video albums ===
Title	Album details
A Flock of Seagulls	Released: 1983; Label: Sony/Zomba; Formats: VHS
Through the Looking Glass	Released: November 1984; Label: Peppermint Video Music, Zomba; Formats: VHS
The Best of A Flock of Seagulls	Released: 1990; Label: BMG Video, Zomba; Formats: VHS
Rainfall	Released: 1996; Label: Savant; Formats: VHS
Messages – Live	Released: 4 February 2010; Label: Delta Entertainment; Formats: DVD

=== Music videos ===
Title	Year	Director
"I Ran (So Far Away)"	1982	Tony van den Ende
"Space Age Love Song"	1982	Tony van den Ende
"Wishing (If I Had a Photograph of You)"	1982	Tony van den Ende
"Nightmares"	1983	Mike Brady
"Transfer Affection"	1983	Mike Brady
"(It's Not Me) Talking"	1983	Mike Brady
"The More You Live, the More You Love"	1984	Unknown
"Never Again (The Dancer)"	1984	Unknown
"Who's That Girl (She's Got It)"	1985	Unknown
"Heartbeat Like a Drum"	1986	Michael Geoghegan
"Magic"	1989	Unknown
"Burnin' Up"	1995	Unknown
"Rainfall"	1996	Unknown
"Space Age Love Song" (with the Prague Philharmonic Orchestra)	2018	Armando at Kinetic Image
"Say You Love Me" (with the Slovenian Symphonic Film Orchestra)	2021	Armando at Kinetic Image
