= The Best of A Flock of Seagulls =

Compilation album by A Flock of Seagulls
- Released: 13 October 1986
- Genre: New wave; synth-pop; dance-pop
- Label: Jive

A Flock of Seagulls compilations chronology
The 12" Singles (1985)	The Best of A Flock of Seagulls (1986)	Telecommunications (1992)

Professional ratings
Review scores
Source	Rating
AllMusic	4/5 stars
Robert Christgau	A−
The Rolling Stone Album Guide	3/5 stars
The Encyclopedia of Popular Music	3/5 stars
Q	2/5 stars

The Best of A Flock of Seagulls is a compilation album by the new wave band A Flock of Seagulls, released in October 1986 by Jive Records. It is the first official compilation album released by the band.

== Track listing ==
All tracks written by M. Score, A. Score, F. Maudsley, and P. Reynolds; except where indicated

No.	Title	Original album	Length
1.	"I Ran (So Far Away)"	A Flock of Seagulls (1981)	4:55
2.	"Space Age Love Song"	A Flock of Seagulls	3:45
3.	"Telecommunication"	A Flock of Seagulls	2:29
4.	"The More You Live, the More You Love"	The Story of a Young Heart (1984)	4:09
5.	"Nightmares"	Listen (1983)	4:36
6.	"Wishing (If I Had a Photograph of You)"	Listen	5:30
7.	"(It's Not Me) Talking"	Listen	5:00
8.	"Transfer Affection"	Listen	5:20
9.	"Who's That Girl (She's Got It)" (M. Score, A Flock of Seagulls)	Dream Come True (1986)	4:17
10.	"D.N.A."	A Flock of Seagulls	2:30
11.	"Wishing (If I Had a Photograph of You) (Extended Version)" (CD bonus track)		9:36
12.	"The More You Live, The More You Love (Full Moon Mix)" (CD bonus track; mislabelled as "The Story of a Young Heart" on some copies)		6:12

== Reception ==
Writing for AllMusic, Stephen Thomas Erlewine wrote that the albums proves "they did do some good new nomantic [sic] synth pop" and that the album "contain[s] all of the group's best material...while new wave fetishists will likely go for the actual albums anyway, most listeners will be more than satisfied with this."
