= I Ran: The Best of A Flock of Seagulls =

Compilation album by A Flock of Seagulls
- Released: 17 February 2004 (US) 26 April 2004 (UK)
- Recorded: 1999
- Genre: New wave
- Label: Cleopatra Records

A Flock of Seagulls compilations chronology
Essential New Wave (2003)	I Ran: The Best of A Flock of Seagulls (2004)	Best of A Flock of Seagulls (2006)

Professional ratings
Review scores
Source	Rating
AllMusic	3.5/5 stars
The Rolling Stone Album Guide	1/5 stars
The Encyclopedia of Popular Music	3/5 stars

I Ran: The Best of A Flock of Seagulls is an album by new wave band A Flock of Seagulls released in 2004. The album has subsequently been reissued under the titles Space Age Love Songs and Greatest Hits.

The album contains Mike Score's new versions of the band's songs that were specially recorded for use on Cleopatra Records remix album Greatest Hits Remixed. The album also contains two remixes taken from that album ("Space Age Love Song (KMFDM Remix)" here being retitled as the Günter Schulz Remix) together with three additional new remixes. These versions were never intended for release as recorded, and Mike Score was reportedly unhappy that they eventually were. According to The Rolling Stone Album Guide, the album is "a tacky bunch of re-recordings" one should steer clear of.

The album art is an homage to Grand Theft Auto: Vice City, which features "I Ran (So Far Away)" on its soundtrack.

== Track listing ==
1. "I Ran (So Far Away)" – 5:02 from A Flock of Seagulls
2. "Space Age Love Song" – 3:49 from A Flock of Seagulls
3. "Telecommunication" – 2:25 from A Flock of Seagulls
4. "The More You Live, the More You Love" – 4:13 from The Story of a Young Heart
5. "Nightmares" – 4:38 from Listen
6. "Wishing (If I Had a Photograph of You)" – 4:55 from Listen
7. "Rainfall" – 5:25 from The Light at the End of the World
8. "Messages" – 2:51 from A Flock of Seagulls
9. "I Ran (So Far Away)" (Die Krupps Remix) – 3:48 from Greatest Hits Remixed
10. "Space Age Love Song" (Günter Schulz Remix) – 4:52 from Greatest Hits Remixed
11. "Wishing (If I Had a Photograph of You)" (Shutter Speed Remix) – 4:20
12. "I Ran (So Far Away)" (Shah of the Dance Remix) – 5:12
13. "Space Age Love Song" (Major Tom Remix) – 4:14
- New Remix (Tracks 11–13)
