= Wishing well (disambiguation) =

Wishing well is a type of well in European folklore.

Wishing Well may also refer to:

== Music ==
- Wishing Well (album), a 2001 album by Monte Montgomery
- "The Wishing Well", an album by Connie Dover, 1994
- The Wishing Well (band), a folk rock band from Melbourne, Australia

=== Songs ===
- "Wishing Well" (Free song), 1972, covered by many other bands and artists
- "Wishing Well" (Terence Trent D'Arby song), 1987
- "Wishing Well" (Phantom Planet song), 2004
- "Wishing Well" (Juice Wrld song), 2020
- "Wishing Well", a song by The Airborne Toxic Event from their self-titled debut album (2008)
- "Wishing Well", a song by Anastacia from Not That Kind (2000)
- "Wishing Well", a song by Angra from Temple of Shadows (2004)
- "Wishing Well", a song by Ben Moody from All for This (2009)
- "Wishing Well", a song by Black Sabbath from Heaven and Hell (1980)
- "Wishing Well", a song by Blind Melon from For My Friends (2008)
- "Wishing Well", a song by Blink-182 from Neighborhoods (2011)
- "Wishing Well", a song by Bob Mould from Workbook (1989)
- "Wishing Well", a song by Dani Stevenson (2010)
- "Wishing Well", a song by Converge from Axe to Fall (2009)
- "Wishing Well", a song by Morissette (2024)
- "Wishing Well", a song by Morphine from Like Swimming (1997)
- "Wishing Well", a song by Chromatics from Closer to Grey (2019)
- "Wishing Well", a song by the Oh Hellos from Through the Deep, Dark Valley (2012)
- "Wishing Wells", a song by Parkway Drive from Reverence (2018)
- "The Wishing Well" (song), a 1987 charity single
- "Wishing Well", a song by Buckethead from Colma (1998)
- "The Wishing Well", a song by Phinehas from Thegodmachine (2011)

== Other uses ==
- Wishing Well (play), 1946 play by Eynon Evans
- Wishing Well (novel), a 2007 book based on the TV series Doctor Who
- Wishing well (wedding), a donation box found at weddings
- Wishing Well (horse), American Thoroughbred racing mare
- "Wishing Well" (Heartbeat), a 1995 television episode
- Wishing Well: Water for the World, a public charity based in Oklahoma City, Oklahoma
- Wishing Well Cluster, another name for the star cluster NGC 3532
- The Wishing Well (film), 2009 Hallmark original movie
- Wishing Well, a speaking recording by Raffi on his 1995 album: "Raffi Radio"
