= Wishing =

Wishing or Wishin' may refer to:

- Wish, a hope or desire for something

== Albums ==
- Wishing (Martine McCutcheon album), 2000
- Wishing, by A Flock of Seagulls, 1996

== Songs ==
- "Wishing" (DJ Drama song), 2016
- "Wishing (If I Had a Photograph of You)", by A Flock of Seagulls, 1982
- "Wishing", by Asia from Astra, 1985
- "Wishing", by Electric Light Orchestra from Discovery, 1979
- "Wishing", by Everclear from Invisible Stars, 2012
- "Wishing", by Irving Berlin
- "Wishin'", by Eddy Howard, 1952
- "Wishin", by Mike McGear from Woman, 1972

== See also ==
- Wishing well (disambiguation)
