= Bill Nelson discography =

Bill Nelson solo discography

- Studio albums: 120
- EPs: 8
- Demo albums: 2
- Soundtrack albums: 4
- Live albums: 2
- Compilation albums: 17
- Singles: 33
- Singles box sets: 1
- Collaborative albums: 2
- Collaborative EPs: 1
- DVDs: 3

The discography of Bill Nelson, excluding records with Be-Bop Deluxe, Red Noise, Channel Light Vessel, and other collaborations, consists of 120 studio albums; this also includes albums within larger album sets that have seen standalone releases at later dates. Nelson has operated under various major and independent records labels such as Mercury, Portrait, Virgin, and personal labels Cocteau and Sonoluxe.

In addition to an extensive solo discography, Nelson has produced and contributed recordings for several artists such as Gary Numan, David Sylvian, Yellow Magic Orchestra, and the Skids.

== Studio albums ==
=== 1970s ===
| Title | Release details |
|---|---|
| Northern Dream | Released: 1971; Label: Smile |

=== 1980s ===
| Title | | Year | Release details | Peak chart positions | Notes |
| Title | | Year | Release details | UK | Notes |
|---|---|---|---|---|---|
| Quit Dreaming and Get on the Beam | | 1981 | Released: May 1981; Label: Mercury | 7 | |
| Sounding the Ritual Echo (Atmospheres for Dreaming) | | 1981 | Released: May 1981; Label: Mercury | — | Rereleased 17 May 1985 (Note: Sounding the Ritual Echo... was originally packaged as a free LP with certain copies of Quit Dreaming and Get on the Beam (1981).) |
| The Love That Whirls (Diary of a Thinking Heart) | | 1982 | Released: June 1982; Label: Mercury | 28 | |
| Chimera (mini album) | | 1983 | Released: May 1983; Label: Mercury | 30 | |
| Savage Gestures for Charms Sake (mini album) | | 1983 | Released: December 1983; Label: Cocteau | — | |
| Trial by Intimacy (The Book of Splendours) (album set) | The Summer of God's Piano | 1985 | Released: 25 January 1985; Label: Cocteau | — | Rereleased October 1986 |
| Trial by Intimacy (The Book of Splendours) (album set) | Chamber of Dreams (Music from the Invisibility Exhibition) | 1985 | Released: 25 January 1985; Label: Cocteau | — | Rereleased June 1986 |
| Trial by Intimacy (The Book of Splendours) (album set) | Pavilions of the Heart and Soul | 1985 | Released: 25 January 1985; Label: Cocteau | — | Each rereleased August 1989 |
| Trial by Intimacy (The Book of Splendours) (album set) | A Catalogue of Obsessions | 1985 | Released: 25 January 1985; Label: Cocteau | — | Each rereleased August 1989 |
| Getting the Holy Ghost Across | | 1986 | Released: 7 April 1986; Label: Portrait | 91 | (Note: Issuing label Portrait, due to fear of backlash in America due to the title for Getting the Holy Ghost Across (1986), released and restructured the album in the US as On a Blue Wing in August 1986) |
| Chameleon | | 1986 | Released: November 1986; Label: Themes International Music | — | |
| Iconography (Orchestra Arcana) | | 1986 | Released: December 1986; Label: Cocteau | — | (Note: The albums Iconography (1986) and Optimism (1988) are credited to Orchestra Arcana, an alias for Bill Nelson.) |
| Map of Dreams | | 1987 | Released: January 1987; Label: Cocteau | — | |
| Chance Encounters in the Garden of Lights (album set) | | 1987 | Released: November 1987; Label: Cocteau | — | (Note: Chance Encounters... (1987) is a studio album set which additionally included Ecclesia Gnostica (Music for the Interior Church) EP exclusive to its release.) |
| Optimism (Orchestra Arcana) | | 1988 | Released: September 1988; Label: Cocteau | — | |
| Demonstrations of Affection (album set) | Chimes and Rings | 1989 | Released: December 1989; Label: Cocteau | — | Each rereleased September 1990 |
| Demonstrations of Affection (album set) | Nudity | 1989 | Released: December 1989; Label: Cocteau | — | Each rereleased September 1990 |
| Demonstrations of Affection (album set) | Heartbreakland | 1989 | Released: December 1989; Label: Cocteau | — | Each rereleased September 1990 |
| Demonstrations of Affection (album set) | Details | 1989 | Released: December 1989; Label: Cocteau | — | Each rereleased September 1990 |
"—" denotes a recording that did not chart or was not released in that territory.

=== 1990s ===
| Title | | Year | Release details | Notes |
|---|---|---|---|---|
| Simplex | | 1990 | Released: September 1990; Label: Cocteau | |
| Altar Pieces | | 1990 | Released: July 1990; Label: The Orpheus Organisation | |
| Crimsworth (Flowers, Stones, Fountains and Flames) | | 1995 | Released: February 1995; Label: Resurgence | |
| Practically Wired (or How I Became Guitar Boy) | | 1995 | Released: March 1995; Label: All Saints | |
| My Secret Studio, Vol. 1 (Music from the Great Magnetic Back of Beyond) (album set) | Buddha Head | 1995 | Released: December 1995; Label: Resurgence | Rereleased April 1997 |
| My Secret Studio, Vol. 1 (Music from the Great Magnetic Back of Beyond) (album set) | Electricity Made Us Angels | 1995 | Released: December 1995; Label: Resurgence | Rereleased April 1997 |
| My Secret Studio, Vol. 1 (Music from the Great Magnetic Back of Beyond) (album set) | Deep Dream Decoder | 1995 | Released: December 1995; Label: Resurgence | Rereleased June 1997 |
| My Secret Studio, Vol. 1 (Music from the Great Magnetic Back of Beyond) (album set) | Juke Box for Jet Boy | 1995 | Released: December 1995; Label: Resurgence | |
| After the Satellite Sings | | 1996 | Released: 30 April 1996; Labels: Gyroscope, Resurgence | |
| Confessions of a Hyperdreamer: My Secret Studio, Vol. 2 (album set) | Weird Critters | 1997 | Released: February 1997; Label: Populuxe | Rereleased June 1998 |
| Confessions of a Hyperdreamer: My Secret Studio, Vol. 2 (album set) | Magnificent Dream People | 1997 | Released: February 1997; Label: Populuxe | |
| Atom Shop | | 1998 | Released: September 1998; Label: Discipline Global Mobile | |

=== 2000s ===
| Title | Year | Release details | Notes |
|---|---|---|---|
| Whistling While the World Turns | 2000 | Released: June 2000; Label: Lenin Imports | |
| Caliban and the Chrome Harmonium | 2001 | Released: August 2001; Label: Almost Opaque | |
| Astral Motel | 2002 | Released: September 2002; Label: Almost Opaque | |
| Noise Candy (A Creamy Centre in Every Bite!) (album set) | 2002 | Released: November 2002; Label: Toneswoon | |
| Whimsy (album set) | 2003 | Released: July 2003; Label: Fabled Quixote | |
| Luxury Lodge | 2003 | Released: August 2003; Label: Almost Opaque | Simultaneously released |
| The Romance of Sustain – Volume One: Painting with Guitars | 2003 | Released: August 2003; Label: Universal Twang | Simultaneously released |
| Plaything | 2004 | Released: January 2004; Label: Universal Twang | |
| Custom Deluxe | 2004 | Released: October 2004; Label: Universal Twang | Simultaneously released |
| Dreamland to Starboard | 2004 | Released: October 2004; Label: Universal Twang | Simultaneously released |
| Satellite Songs | 2004 | Released: October 2004; Label: Sonic Masonic | Simultaneously released |
| Wah-Wah Galaxy | 2004 | Released: November 2004; Label: Almost Opaque | |
| Rosewood – Ornaments and Graces for Acoustic Guitar: Volume One | 2005 | Released: May 2005; Label: Sonoluxe | |
| Rosewood – Ornaments and Graces for Acoustic Guitar: Volume Two | 2005 | Released: July 2005; Label: Sonoluxe | |
| Orpheus in Ultraland | 2005 | Released: October 2005; Label: Discs of Ancient Odeon | |
| The Alchemical Adventures of Sailor Bill: a Coastal Song Suite | 2005 | Released: November 2005; Label: Sonoluxe | (Note: In The Alchemical Adventures of Sailor Bill... (2005), Nelson is credited as Bill Nelson and His Lighthouse Signal Mechanism Orchestra.) |
| Neptune's Galaxy | 2006 | Released: July 2006; Label: Sonoluxe | |
| Arcadian Salon | 2006 | Released: October 2006; Label: Discs of Ancient Odeon | Simultaneously released |
| Return to Jazz of Lights | 2006 | Released: October 2006; Label: Sonoluxe | Simultaneously released |
| Gleaming Without Lights | 2007 | Released: April 2007; Label: Sonoluxe | |
| Secret Club for Members Only | 2007 | Released: October 2007; Label: Discs of Ancient Odeon | Simultaneously released |
| And We Fell into a Dream | 2007 | Released: October 2007; Label: Sonoluxe | Simultaneously released |
| Silvertone Fountains | 2008 | Released: June 2008; Label: Sonoluxe | Simultaneously released |
| Illuminated at Dusk | 2008 | Released: June 2008; Label: Sonoluxe | Simultaneously released |
| Mazda Kaleidoscope | 2008 | Released: September 2008; Label: Sonoluxe | |
| Clocks & Dials | 2008 | Released: November 2008; Label: Discs of Ancient Odeon | Simultaneously released |
| Golden Melodies of Tomorrow | 2008 | Released: November 2008; Label: Sonoluxe | Simultaneously released |
| Fancy Planets | 2009 | Released: July 2009; Label: Sonoluxe | Simultaneously released |
| Here Comes Mr Mercury | 2009 | Released: July 2009; Label: Sonoluxe | Simultaneously released |
| The Dream Transmission Pavilion | 2009 | Released: September 2009; Label: Discs of Ancient Odeon | Simultaneously released |
| Theatre of Falling Leaves | 2009 | Released: September 2009; Label: Sonoluxe | Simultaneously released |
| Non-Stop Mystery Action | 2009 | Released: November 2009; Label: Sonoluxe | |

=== 2010s ===
| Title | Year | Release details | Peak chart positions | | Notes |
| Title | Year | Release details | UK Indie | SCOT | Notes |
|---|---|---|---|---|---|
| Modern Moods For Mighty Atoms | 2010 | Released: September 2010; Label: Blue Shining Fountain | — | — | |
| Captain Future's Psychotronic Circus | 2010 | Released: November 2010; Label: Discs of Ancient Odeon | — | — | Simultaneously released |
| Fables and Dreamsongs (A Golden Book of Experimental Ballads) | 2010 | Released: November 2010; Label: Sonoluxe | — | — | Simultaneously released |
| Fantasmatron | 2011 | Released: August 2011; Label: Sonoluxe | — | — | |
| Hip Pocket Jukebox (mini album) | 2011 | Released: October 2011; Label: none | — | — | Simultaneously released |
| Model Village | 2011 | Released: October 2011; Label: Sonoluxe | — | — | Simultaneously released |
| Signals from Realms of Light | 2011 | Released: October 2011; Label: Sonoluxe | — | — | Simultaneously released |
| Songs of the Blossom Tree Optimists | 2012 | Released: January 2012; Label: Sonoluxe | — | — | |
| The Last of the Neon Cynics | 2012 | Released: May 2012; Label: Sonoluxe | — | — | (Note: The CD release of The Last of the Neon Cynics (2012) additionally contained a graphic novel by Matt Howarth.) |
| Joy Through Amplification: The Ultra-Fuzzy World of Priapus Stratocaster | 2012 | Released: July 2012; Label: Sonoluxe | — | — | |
| Return to Tomorrow (These Tapes Rewind: Volume One) | 2012 | Released: September 2012; Label: Discs of Ancient Odeon | — | — | Simultaneously released |
| The Palace of Strange Voltages | 2012 | Released: September 2012; Label: Sonoluxe | — | — | Simultaneously released |
| The Dreamshire Chronicles | 2012 | Released: November 2012; Label: Sonoluxe | — | — | |
| Blip! | 2013 | Released: June 2013; Label: Sonoluxe | — | — | Simultaneously released |
| The Tremulous Doo-Wah Diddy (Blip! 2) | 2013 | Released: June 2013; Label: Sonoluxe | — | — | Simultaneously released |
| Albion Dream Vortex | 2013 | Released: September 2013; Label: Sonoluxe | — | — | |
| The Sparkle Machine (Several Sustained Moments) | 2013 | Released: December 2013; Label: Sonoluxe | — | — | |
| Stereo Star Maps | 2014 | Released: November 2014; Label: Sonoluxe | — | — | |
| Shining Reflector | 2014 | Released: December 2014; Label: Sonoluxe | — | — | |
| Astroloops | 2015 | Released: January 2015; Label: Astrotone | — | — | (Note: Astroloops (2015) was exclusively released with a purchase of an Astroluxe Cadet from Eastwood Guitars.) |
| Quiet Bells | 2015 | Released: March 2015; Label: Sonoluxe | — | — | |
| Swoons and Levitations (Musical Magic from Fantasmo's Soundarium) | 2015 | Released: April 2015; Label: Sonoluxe | — | — | |
| The Years | 2015 | Released: June 2015; Label: Sonoluxe | — | — | |
| Plectrajet (Painting with Guitars Volume Two) | 2015 | Released: August 2015; Label: Sonoluxe | — | — | |
| Electric Atlas | 2015 | Released: November 2015; Label: Sonoluxe | — | — | |
| Loom (Astroloops Volume Two) | 2015 | Released: December 2015; Label: Astrotone | — | — | |
| Perfect Monsters | 2016 | Released: February 2016; Label: Sonoluxe | — | — | |
| Special Metal | 2016 | Released: April 2016; Label: Tremolo Boy | — | — | |
| All That I Remember | 2016 | Released: July 2016; Label: Sonoluxe | — | — | |
| New Northern Dream | 2016 | Released: October 2016; Label: Sonoluxe | — | — | |
| Six String Super Apparatus (Painting with Guitars Volume Three) | 2016 | Released: December 2016; Label: Tremolo Boy | — | — | |
| The Awakening of Dr Dream | 2017 | Released: March 2017; Label: Tremolo Boy | — | — | |
| Kid Flip & the Golden Spacemen | 2017 | Released: April 2017; Label: Tremolo Boy | — | — | |
| Luxury Wonder Moments | 2017 | Released: May 2017; Label: Sonoluxe | — | — | |
| Songs for Ghosts | 2017 | Released: October 2017; Label: Sonoluxe | — | — | |
| That Old Mysterioso | 2018 | Released: January 2018; Label: Sonoluxe | — | — | |
| The Unrealist | 2018 | Released: February 2018; Label: Tremolo Boy | — | — | |
| Drive This Comet Across the Sky | 2018 | Released: April 2018; Label: Tremolo Boy | — | — | |
| Dynamos and Tremolos | 2018 | Released: July 2018; Label: Sonoluxe | — | — | |
| Auditoria | 2018 | Released: December 2018; Label: Sonoluxe | — | — | |
| Stand By: Light Coming | 2019 | Released: August 2019; Label: Sonoluxe | 26 | 86 | |
| The Last Lamplighter | 2019 | Released: August 2019; Label: Tremolo Boy | — | — | |
| Old Haunts | 2019 | Released: November 2019; Label: Sonoluxe | 47 | — | |
"—" denotes a recording that did not chart or was not released in that territory.

=== 2020s ===
| Title | Year | Release details | Peak chart positions | |
| Title | Year | Release details | UK Indie | SCOT |
|---|---|---|---|---|
| The Jewel | 2020 | Released: April 2020; Label: Sonoluxe | 11 | 68 |
| New Vibrato Wonderland | 2020 | Released: December 2020; Label: Sonoluxe | 45 | — |
| Dazzlebox | 2021 | Released: April 2021; Label: Sonoluxe | — | — |
| Mixed Up Kid | 2021 | Released: December 2021; Label: Sonoluxe | — | — |
| My Private Cosmos | 2021 | Released: December 2021; Label: Sonoluxe | 47 | — |
| Electra (In Search of the Golden Sound) | 2022 | Released: July 2022; Label: Sonoluxe | 25 | — |
| Marvellous Realms | 2023 | Released: January 2023; Label: Sonoluxe | — | — |
| Stupid/Serious | 2023 | Released: January 2023; Label: Sonoluxe | — | — |
| All the Fun of the Fair | 2023 | Released: November 2023; Label: Sonoluxe | 47 | — |
| Starlight Stories | 2023 | Released: December 2023; Label: Sonoluxe | — | — |
| Powertron | 2024 | Released: 5 May 2024; Label: Sonoluxe | 37 | — |
| Studio Cadet | 2024 | Released: 6 December 2024; Label: Sonoluxe | — | — |
| Magical Thinking: Guitars of Tomorrow Volume One | 2026 | Released: 10 September 2026; Label: Sonoluxe | TBA | |
"—" denotes a recording that did not chart or was not released in that territory.

== Extended plays ==
| Title | Year | Release details |
|---|---|---|
| Sleepcycle | 1982 | Released: April 1982; Label: Cocteau |
| King of the Cowboys | 1982 | Released: October 1982; Label: Cocteau |
| Flaming Desire and Other Passions | 1982 | Released: December 1982; Label: PVC |
| Dancing on a Knife's Edge | 1983 | Released: May 1983; Label: Cocteau |
| The World and His Wife | 1983 | Released: November 1983; Label: Cocteau |
| Hard Facts from the Fiction Department | 1984 | Released: May 1984; Label: Cocteau |
| Giants of the Perpetual Wurlitzer | 1984 | Released: December 1984; Label: Cocteau |
| The Cote D'Azur E.P. | 1986 | Released: October 1986; Label: Cocteau |

== Demo albums ==
| Title | Release details |
|---|---|
| Luminous | Released: April 1991; Label: Imaginary |
| Blue Moons & Laughing Guitars | Released: August 1992; Label: Virgin |

== Soundtracks ==
| Title | Release details | Notes |
|---|---|---|
| Das Kabinett (the Cabinet of Dr. Caligari) | Released: November 1981; Label: Cocteau | (Note: The soundtracks Das Kabinett... (1981) and La Belle et la Bête (originally released with some copies of the 1982 studio album The Love That Whirls...) were both made for stage productions by the Yorkshire Actors Company; both soundtracks were later reissued together as a double album in 1985.) |
| La Belle et la Bête | Released: June 1982; Label: Mercury | (Note: The soundtracks Das Kabinett... (1981) and La Belle et la Bête (originally released with some copies of the 1982 studio album The Love That Whirls...) were both made for stage productions by the Yorkshire Actors Company; both soundtracks were later reissued together as a double album in 1985.) |
| Picture Post | Released: April 2010; Label: Sonoluxe | (Note: Picture Post is the soundtrack to the documentary American Stamps.) |
| Pedalscope | Released: June 2014; Label: Sonoluxe | (Note: Pedalscope (2014) is the soundtrack to the cycling documentary Velorama.) |

== Live albums ==
| Title | Release details | Notes |
|---|---|---|
| Recorded Live in Concert at Metropolis Studios, London | Released: June 2012; Label: Salvo | (Note: Credited as Bill Nelson and the Gentlemen Rocketeers.) |
| Tripping the Light Fantastic | Released: September 2017; Label: Sonoluxe | |

== Singles ==
| Title | Year | Peak chart positions | | Album | Notes |
| Title | Year | UK | UK Indie | Album | Notes |
|---|---|---|---|---|---|
| "Do You Dream in Colour?" | 1980 | 52 | — | Quit Dreaming and Get on the Beam | |
| "Rooms with Brittle Views" | 1981 | — | — | Non-album single | |
| "Banal" | 1981 | — | — | Quit Dreaming and Get on the Beam | |
| "Youth of Nation on Fire" | 1981 | 73 | — | Quit Dreaming and Get on the Beam | |
| "Living in My Limousine" | 1981 | — | — | Quit Dreaming and Get on the Beam | |
| "Airfields" (To Heaven a Jet) / "Tony Goes to Tokyo (and Rides the Bullet Train)" (The Revox Cadets) | 1981 | — | — | Non-album single | (Note: In the single B-side "Tony Goes to Tokyo (and Rides the Bullet Train)" (1981), Nelson is credited as The Revox Cadet.) |
| "Eros Arriving" | 1982 | — | — | The Love That Whirls (Diary of a Thinking Heart) | |
| "Flaming Desire" | 1982 | — | — | The Love That Whirls (Diary of a Thinking Heart) | |
| "Touch and Glow" | 1983 | — | — | Permanent Flame (The Beginner's Guide to Bill Nelson) | |
| "Acceleration" | 1984 | 78 | 4 | Chimera | |
| "Sex-Psyche-Etc" (Orchestra Arcana) | 1985 | — | — | Iconography | |
| "Wildest Dreams" | 1986 | — | — | Getting the Holy Ghost Across | |
| "Secret Ceremony" (Scala) (theme from Brond) | 1987 | — | — | Non-album single | (Note: The 1987 single "Secret Ceremony" is credited to Scala, a group that consisted of Bill Nelson & Daryl Runswick.) |
| "Life in Your Hands" | 1989 | — | — | Non-album single | |
| "The Dead We Wake with Upstairs Drums" | 1992 | — | — | Blue Moons & Laughing Guitars | |
| "Six Strings for Sara" | 2007 | — | — | Non-album single | |
| "Contemplation-2007" | 2007 | — | — | Getting the Holy Ghost Across | |
| "The Dreamsville Poetry Experiment" (with the Dreamsville Poets) | 2007 | — | — | Non-album single | |
| "A Million Whistling Milkmen" | 2008 | — | — | Non-album single | Simultaneously released |
| "I Hear Electricity" / "Kiss You Slowly" | 2008 | — | — | Fancy Planets / The Dream Transmission Pavilon | Simultaneously released |
| "Rocket to the Moon" | 2009 | — | — | Non-album single | |
| "The Jingler" | 2009 | — | — | Non-album single | |
| "Soluna Oriana" | 2010 | — | — | Non-album single | |
| "Holey Moley, It's a Parallel World!" | 2010 | — | — | Non-album single | |
| "Frost-O-Matic" | 2010 | — | — | Non-album single | |
| "Silent Night" | 2012 | — | — | Non-album single | Simultaneously released |
| "Think and You'll Miss It" / "Beat Street" | 2012 | — | — | Non-album single | Simultaneously released |
| "Snow Is Falling" | 2013 | — | — | Arcadian Salon | |
| "Starland" | 2013 | — | — | Non-album single | |
| "The Rumbler" / "Perfidia 2017" | 2017 | — | — | Non-album single | |
| "Variation on the Theme of a White Christmas" | 2017 | — | — | Non-album single | |
| "The Lockdown Song (It's All Downhill from Here)" | 2020 | — | — | Non-album single | |
| "Brave Flag" / "Mondo Bravado" | 2022 | — | — | Non-album single | |
| "All Dressed Up in Your Art School Clothes" / "Five Flying Horses" | 2023 | — | — | Non-album single | |
"—" denotes a recording that did not chart or was not released in that territory.

== Collaborations ==
=== Albums ===
| Title | Release details |
|---|---|
| Culturemix with Bill Nelson (with Culturemix) | Released: November 1995; Label: Resurgence |
| Fantastic Guitars (with Reeves Gabrels) | Released: July 2014; Label: Sonoluxe |

=== Extended plays ===
| Title | Release details |
|---|---|
| Three White Roses & a Budd (with Harold Budd and Fila Brazillia) | Released: 2002; Label: Twentythree |

== DVDs ==
| Title | Release Details |
|---|---|
| Flashlight Dreams... and Fleeting Shadows: an Audio-Optical Diary by Bill Nelson | Release date: 2003; Label: Voiceprint |
| Picture House | Release date: 2010; Label: Visuluxe |
| Bill Nelson and the Gentlemen Rocketeers: Filmed live at Metropolis Studios | Release date: 2011; Label: ITV Studios Home Entertainment |

== Compilations ==
=== Albums ===
| Title | Year | Release details | Peak chart positions | Notes |
| Title | Year | Release details | UK Indie | Notes |
|---|---|---|---|---|
| Vistamix | 1984 | Released: October 1984; Label: Portrait | — | |
| The Two-Fold Aspect of Everything | 1985 | Released: February 1985; Label: Cocteau | — | |
| Das Kabinett / La Belle et la Bête | 1985 | Released: 1985; Label: Cocteau | — | |
| Living for the Spangled Moment (mini album) | 1986 | Released: September 1986; Label: Portrait | — | |
| Chimera / Savage Gestures for Charms Sake | 1987 | Released: 1987; Label: Cocteau | — | |
| The Strangest Things (A Collection of Recordings: 1979–1989) | 1989 | Released: October 1989; Label: Enigma | — | |
| Duplex: The Best of Bill Nelson | 1989 | Released: September 1989; Label: Cocteau | — | |
| Magpie Box Set | 1992 | Released: 1992; Label: Magpie Direct Music | — | |
| What Now, What Next? (The Cocteau Years Compendium 1980-1990) | 1998 | Released: September 1998; Label: Discipline Global Mobile | — | |
| The Hermetic Jukebox (Orchestra Arcana) | 2002 | Released: December 2002; Label: Fabled Quixote | — | |
| Crimsworth / Culturemix | 2003 | Released: 2003; Label: Resurgence | — | |
| The Practice of Everyday Life: Celebrating 40 Years of Recordings | 2011 | Released: December 2011; Label: Esoteric | — | |
| The Dreamer's Companion Volume 1: How I Got My Secret Powers | 2014 | Released: January 2014; Label: Sonoluxe | — | Simultaneously released |
| The Dreamer's Companion Volume 2: In This I Reveal My Secret Identity | 2014 | Released: January 2014; Label: Sonoluxe | — | Simultaneously released |
| The Dreamer's Companion Volume 3: Songs of the Bel-Air Rocketmen | 2014 | Released: January 2014; Label: Sonoluxe | — | Simultaneously released |
| Dreamy Screens: Soundtracks from the Echo Observator | 2017 | Released: December 2017; Label: Esoteric | — | |
| Transcorder: The Acquitted by Mirrors Recordings | 2020 | Released: December 2020; Label: Sonoluxe | 37 | |
"—" denotes a recording that did not chart or was not released in that territory.

=== Singles box sets ===
| Title | Release details | Notes |
|---|---|---|
| Permanent Flame (The Beginners Guide to Bill Nelson) | Released: November 1983; Label: Cocteau | (Note: Except for the single "Touch and Glow", the singles box set Permanent Flame... (1983) contained material previously released by Nelson, Be-Bop Deluxe, and Red Noise.) |

=== Compilation appearances ===
| Title | Release details |
|---|---|
| Future Perfect | Released: 1995; Label: All Saints |
| Electrotype: The Holyground Recordings 1968–1972 | Released: February 2001; Label: Holyground |

== Contributions ==
=== Albums ===
| Year | Album | Artist | Role |
|---|---|---|---|
| 1970 | A to Austr (Musics from Holy Ground) | A to Austr | Guitar and Hawaiian guitar |
| 1971 | Astral Navigations (split album) | Lightyears Away / Thundermother | Guitar on "Yesterday" and "Today (North County Cinderella)"; guitar, vocals on "Tomorrow (Buffalo)" |
| 1978 | Disguise in Love | John Cooper Clarke | Guitar on "I Don't Want To Be Nice", "Readers Wives", and "Health Fanatic" |
| 1979 | Days in Europa (original mix) | Skids | Producer, keyboards |
| 1980 | Days in Europa (remix) | Skids | Co-producer, keyboards |
| 1981 | La Rocca! | Snips | Synthesizers |
| 1982 | Rice Music | Masami Tsuchiya | E-bow guitar |
| 1982 | What Me Worry? | Yukihiro Takahashi | Guitars, E-bow guitar |
| 1983 | Listen | A Flock of Seagulls | Producer on "(It's Not Me) Talking" |
| 1983 | Naughty Boys | Yellow Magic Orchestra | Guitar |
| 1983 | Naughty Boys (Instrumental) | Yellow Magic Orchestra | Guitar |
| 1983 | Third Eye | Monsoon | E-bow guitar, electric guitar; bass on "Tomorrow Never Knows" |
| 1983 | Tomorrow's Just Another Day | Yukihiro Takahashi | Guitar on "This Island Earth"; guitar, backing vocals on "Are You Receiving Me" |
| 1983 | Warriors | Gary Numan | Guitar, keyboards; co-producer except "Sister Surprise", "The Tick Tock Man", and "Love Is Like Clock Law" |
| 1984 | Time and Place | Yukihiro Takahashi | Guitar, vocals |
| 1984 | Viva Lava Liva | Sandii & the Sunsetz | Lyrics on "Walk Away" |
| 1984 | Wild & Moody | Yukihiro Takahashi | Guitar, vocals on "Helpless"; lyrics, co-composer, guitar, vocals on "Bounds of Reason Bonds of Love" |
| 1986 | Gone to Earth | David Sylvian | Guitar on "Before the Bullfight", "Wave", "Silver Moon", "The Healing Place", "Answered Prayers", and "Sunlight Seen Through Towering Trees" |
| 1987 | Code | Cabaret Voltaire | Guitar on "Don't Argue", "Here to Go", "Trouble (Won't Stop)", "White Car", and "No One Here" |
| 1987 | Still Looking for Heaven on Earth | Crazy House | Guitar on "Burning Rain", "This Means Everything to Me", "Feel the Fire", "Heaven Said My Name", and "Shake (Sell Your Soul)" |
| 1988 | Ego | Yukihiro Takahashi | Co-writer on "Only the Heart Has Heard" |
| 1990 | Gagalactyca (split album) | Chris Coombs & Lightyears Away / Thundermother | Lead guitar on Chris Coombs & Lightyears Away tracks |
| 1991 | By the Dawn's Early Light | Harold Budd | Acoustic and electric guitars; co-composer on "The Place of Dead Roads" |
| 1991 | Heaven & Hell: A Tribute to the Velvet Underground – Volume Two | Various | Producer, keyboard on "Pale Blue Eyes"; "Lonesome Cowboy Bill" (Bill Nelson and the Roy Rogers Rocketeers) |
| 1991 | Lovesnake | Jean Park | Producer on "Your Body in Soap" and "Feel like a Wheel" |
| 1991 | Rain Tree Crow | Rain Tree Crow | Guitar on "Big Wheels in Shanty Town", "Blackwater", and "Blackcrow Hits Shoe Shine City" |
| 1991 | Willerby | The Rhythm Sisters | Producer, guitars, sitar, keyboards |
| 1992 | Chill & Kiss | Ramon Tikaram | Guitar on "Love So Terse", "Get It On", "This Song in You", and "Get Stoned" |
| 1992 | The Familiar | Roger Eno with Kate St John | Co-producer, guitar, percussion, Korg M1 synthesizer |
| 1993 | Geography | Culturemix | Guitars |
| 1994 | Earthly Paradise | Joe Hisaishi | Musician |
| 1995 | Lines of Desire | Su Lyn | Producer, guitar, bass on "Out of the Ice Age", "The Photograph", and "Precinct of Life" |
| 1995 | The Way Out Is the Way In | Audio Active & Laraaji | Guitar on "Music & Cosmic (Feel Yourself)" |
| 1996 | 360° | Gillcover & the Monkey | Producer, keyboards |
| 1997 | Yablokitay | Nautilus Pompilius | Producer, guitars, keyboards, percussion, vocals |
| 2001 | Alienshamanism | Dr. Jan (guru) | Guitar solo on "Alienshamanism – Prologue"; flamenco guitar solo on "Flamenco Luminoso"; guitars and E-bow guitars on "Desire Machine" |
| 2001 | Loose Routes: One – Music from Holyground | Various | "A Little Bit of Nelsonia", "Outro to the Friend", and "Dear Mr. Fantasy" |
| 2001 | Loose Routes: Two – Music from Holyground | Various | Guitar on "From King John's Christmas" |
| 2010 | Leaving the Electric Circus | Sea of Wires | Co-producer, mixer, guitars |
| 2015 | Dreams & Absurdities | Dave Sturt | Co-writer, guitar, E-bow guitar on "White & Greens in Blue" |
| 2016 | Animals They Dream About | Units | Co-producer, synthesizers, guitars, drums |

=== Extended plays ===
| Year | EP | Artist | Role |
|---|---|---|---|
| 1983 | New Way to Move | Units | Producer, guitar, synthesizer |
| 1999 | The Eternal Desire Machines of Dr Jan | Dr. Jan (guru) | Guitars and E-bow guitars on "Desire Machine (Dance Meditation)" |
| 2000 | Pink & Clean | Honeytone Cody | Producer |
| 2000 | Believe in the Promise of Tomorrow | Honeytone Cody | Producer, piano |

=== Singles ===
| Year | Single | Artist | Role |
|---|---|---|---|
| 1979 | "Charade" / "Grey Parade" | Skids | Producer, keyboards; co-writer on "Grey Parade" |
| 1979 | "Masquerade" | Skids | Co-producer, keyboard arrangements |
| 1979 | "Working for the Yankee Dollar" / "Vanguard's Crusade" | Skids | Producer, keyboards on "Vanguard's Crusade" |
| 1980 | "Animation" / "Pros & Cons" | Skids | Keyboards; Co-producer on "Animation"; producer on "Pros & Cons" |
| 1981 | "Losing You" | Stranger Than Fiction | Producer |
| 1981 | "Novel Romance" | Nash the Slash | Producer only on "Novel Romance" |
| 1981 | "Telecommunication" | A Flock of Seagulls | Producer only on "Telecommunication" |
| 1982 | "Are You Receiving Me" | Yukihiro Takahashi | Guitar, backing vocals only on "Are You Receiving Me" |
| 1982 | "Tomorrow Never Knows" | Monsoon | Guitars and bass |
| 1982 | "Wings of the Dawn (Prem Kavita)" | Monsoon | E-bow guitar only on "Wings of the Dawn (Prem Kavita)" |
| 1983 | "(It's Not Me) Talking" | A Flock of Seagulls | Producer only on "(It's Not Me) Talking" |
| 1983 | "Sister Surprise" / "Poetry & Power" | Gary Numan | Co-producer on "Poetry & Power" |
| 1983 | "Warriors" | Gary Numan | Co-producer, guitar, keyboards |
| 1985 | "Castles in Spain" / "A Gathering", "Ring Those Bells" (12") | The Armoury Show | Co-writer on "Ring Those Bells" |
| 1985 | "Stranger Things Have Happened" / "Bounds of Reason, Bonds of Love", "Metaphysical Jerks" (12") | Yukihiro Takahashi | Co-writer, vocals, guitar, keyboards on "Bounds of Reason, Bonds of Love"; writer, guitar, keyboards on "Metaphysical Jerks" |
| 1990 | "Infotainment" | The Rhythm Sisters | Producer, guitar, sitar, keyboards |
| 1990 | "Magic Boomerang" | The Mock Turtles | Producer |
| 1991 | "Rain" / "She Rides" | The Rain Poets | Producer; guitar on "Rain"; sitar on "She Rides" |
