= Modern Love Is Automatic =

EP by A Flock of Seagulls
- Released: 13 November 1981
- Studio: Battery, London
- Genre: Goth
- Label: Jive
- Producer: Mike Howlett

A Flock of Seagulls chronology
Telecommunication (1981)	Modern Love Is Automatic (1981)	I Ran (So Far Away) (1982)

Music video
- "Modern Love Is Automatic" on YouTube

Modern Love Is Automatic is a 1981 EP by the British new wave band A Flock of Seagulls, written by Mike Score, Ali Score, Frank Maudsley and Paul Reynolds. The song of the same name was also showcased on their self-titled album the following year. The song peaked at #19 on the US Dance Club Play chart as a double A-side with Telecommunication.

Phil Spector expressed admiration for the song – as with many other tracks on the album – and at one point planned on producing the band's next album. However, this never happened due to a conflict with Jive Records and his increasingly reclusive lifestyle.

== Lyrics ==
As with many of the group's lyrics, harmonies and videos, there is a suggestion of cosmic energy and other-world imagery in the song. According to John Gentile of Punknews.org, lead singer Mike Score "sings in a restrained, robotic voice, lamenting that in the modern ('80s) age, emotions are as much driven by marketing and corporate interests as they are true affection." He also compared Score's vocal delivery to Bauhaus vocalist Peter Murphy, arguing that like Murphy, "Score laments the loss of a love and vows to hold true for all time, giving the slightest of nods towards vampirism."

== Track listing ==
7" Jive 8 (UK) (Released 13 November 1981)

No.	Title	Length
1.	"Modern Love Is Automatic"	4:00
2.	"D.N.A."	2:30
3.	"Windows"	3:28
4.	"You Can Run"	4:28

7" Jive 12 (UK) (Released 15 January 1982)

No.	Title	Length
1.	"Modern Love Is Automatic"	4:00
2.	"Telecommunication"	2:30

12" Jive T12 (UK) (Released 15 January 1982)

No.	Title	Length
1.	"Modern Love Is Automatic"
2.	"Telecommunication"
3.	"D.N.A."
4.	"Windows"
5.	"You Can Run"

_{A} _{Telecommunication produced by Bill Nelson}

12" Arista VK22001 (US)

No.	Title	Length
1.	"Telecommunication"	2:33
2.	"Tanglimara"	4:37
3.	"You Can Run"	4:26
4.	"Modern Love Is Automatic"	3:44
5.	"D.N.A."	2:31

_{B} _{Tanglimara produced by Steve Lovell}

== Charts ==
Chart (1981)	Peak position
UK Bubbling Under Singles (Record Business)	105
US Dance Club Play	19
