= 1st & Repair =

Studio album by Monte Montgomery
- Released: 1998
- Recorded: 1998
- Genre: Guitar Virtuoso, Rock, Pop
- Label: Heart Music
- Producer: Monte Montgomery and Tab Bartling

1st & Repair is a 1998 album by Monte Montgomery.

== Track listing ==
All tracks are written by Monte Montgomery.

No.	Title	Length
1.	"Movin On"	2:34
2.	"Sorry Doesn't Cut It"	3:45
3.	"1st & Repair"	3:04
4.	"Love to the People"	3:19
5.	"Leaving Paradise"	5:15
6.	"Girl Like You"	5:00
7.	"River"	4:30
8.	"Pocket Change"	3:08
9.	"The Fall"	4:35
10.	"Last Goodbye"	2:48
11.	"It's Alright"	3:27
12.	"For What It's Worth"	3:18
13.	"Love Come Knockin'"	9:52

== Personnel ==
- Monte Montgomery – Guitar, Vocals
- Phil Bass – Drums, Percussion
- Chris Maresh – Bass
