= Monte Montgomery =

American guitarist and singer-songwriter (born 1966)

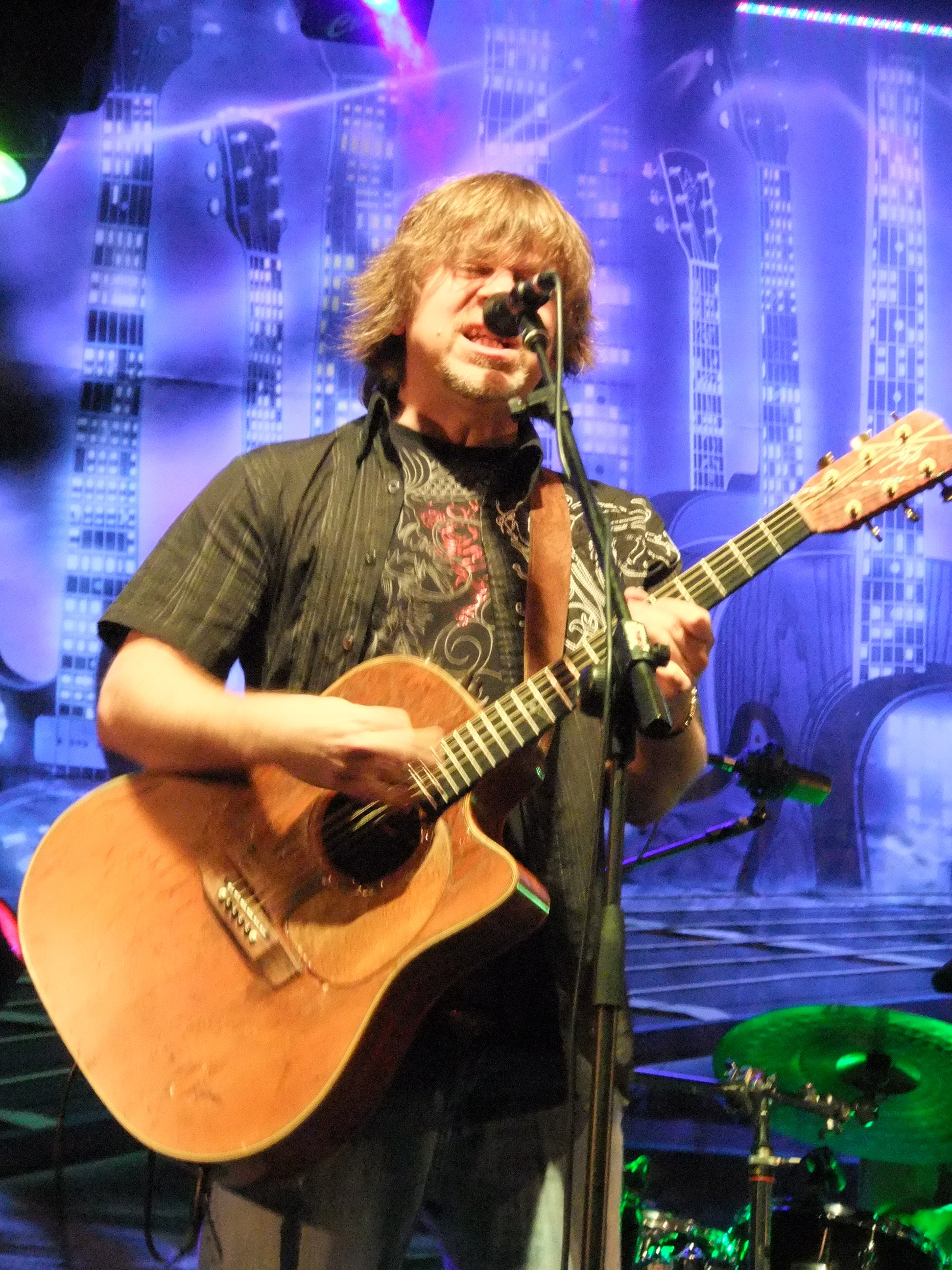
- Monte Montgomery Soave during a live band

Background information
- Born: Monte Patrick Montgomery; August 11, 1966 (age 60); Birmingham, Alabama
- Genres: Acoustic rock, blues, pop rock
- Occupations: Musician, singer-songwriter
- Instrument: 1988 Alvarez-Yairi DY62C Acoustic-Electric Guitar
- Labels: Harmonic Records, Provogue
- Website: MonteMontgomery.net

Monte Patrick Montgomery (born August 11, 1966) is an American guitarist and singer-songwriter.

== Early life ==
Born in Birmingham, Alabama, at age 13 he moved to San Antonio, Texas.

== Career ==
The Austin, Texas based guitarist first gained notoriety in 1999, after performing on an episode of the PBS series Austin City Limits. He was named one of the "Top 50 All-Time Greatest Guitar Players" by Guitar Player Magazine and won the "Best Acoustic Guitar Player" Award at the Austin Chronicle's Austin Music Awards seven years in a row.

Montgomery composed for the ABC TV series Last Man Standing. Montgomery authored music for the criminal drama Arc (2006) In 2008, Monte appeared on the music show Live From Daryl's House.

In 2004, Alvarez Guitars created the MMY1 Monte Montgomery Signature Guitar, a model based on Montgomery's 1987 Alvarez-Yairi DY62C Acoustic-Electric Guitar.

== Discography ==
=== Studio albums ===
- Monte Montgomery [EP] (1990)
- Lost & Found (1993)
- 1st & Repair (1998, Heart)
- Mirror (1999, Heart)
- Wishing Well (2001)
- The Story Of Love (2003)
- Architect (2004)
- Monte Montgomery (2008)
- Tethered (2012)
- Dragonfly (2016)
- A Call To Arms (2019)

=== Live albums ===
- Live at the Caravan of Dreams (2002)
- New & Approved (2003)
- At WorkPlay (2005)

=== Live DVDs ===
- At WorkPlay (2005)

== Personal life ==
Monte has four children and in March 2009, his eldest daughter, Sofia Anna Mondini died in an accidental handgun incident.
