= The Wishing Well (band) =

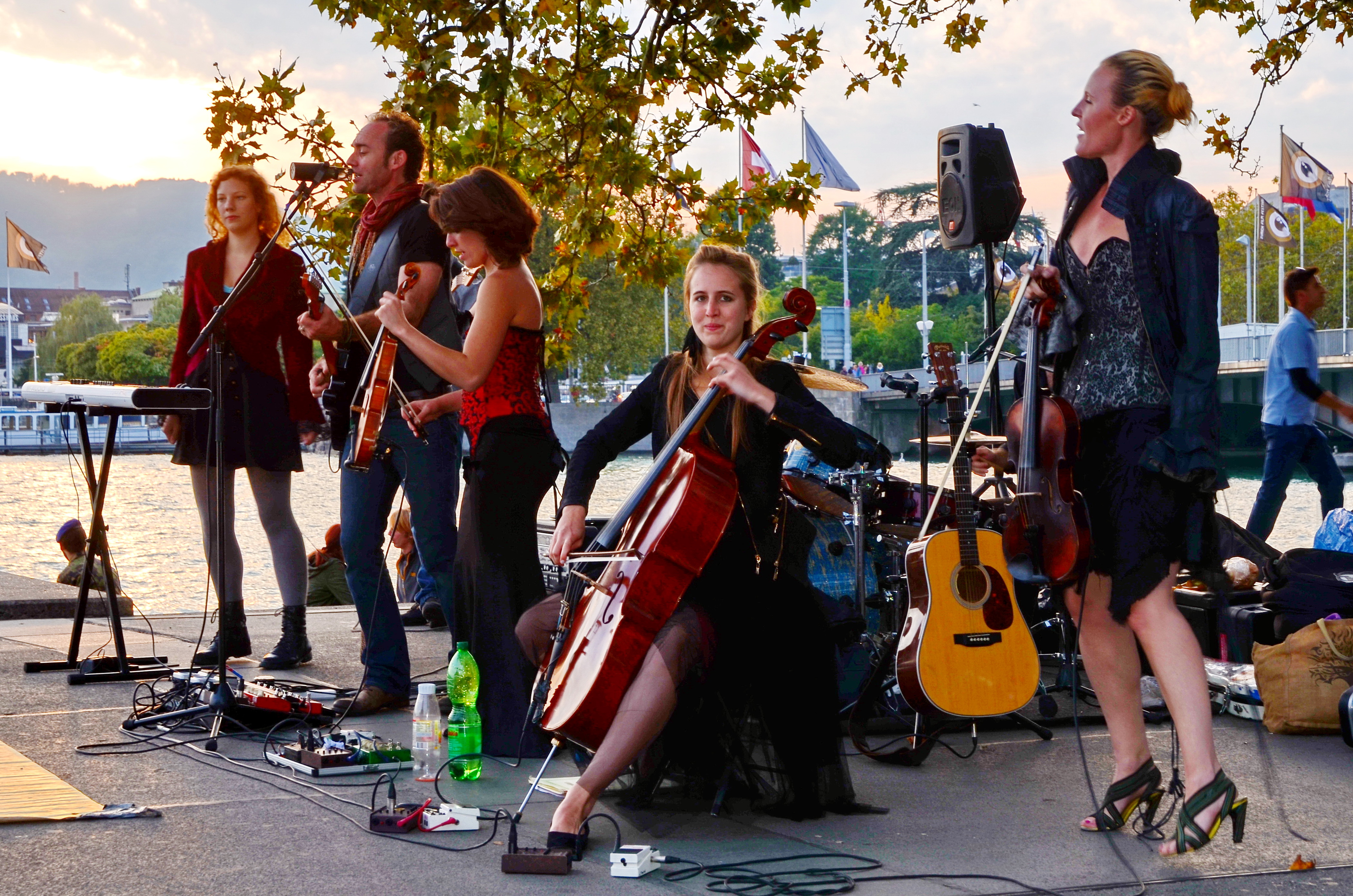
- The Wishing Well, a street performance in Zürich, Switzerland

Background information
- Origin: Melbourne, Australia
- Genres: Folk rock
- Years active: 2006 – present
- Labels: Independent
- Website: http://www.thewishingwellband.com

The Wishing Well is a six-piece folk-rock band originally hailing from Melbourne, Australia. Since their formation in 2008, they have played over 660 international shows on various tours and sold over 60,000 CDs independently.

All of The Wishing Well's music is written and arranged by lead vocalist Jai Larkan, who has previously supported artists such as Bob Geldof, Andy White, Liam Ó Maonlaí and Tim Finn. The band has shared the stage with performers such as David Gray (musician), James Morrison, Seal, Eric Bibb, Joss Stone, The Dubliners, Arlo Guthrie and Korn.

They have played festivals such as the Queenscliff Music Festival (Australia), Blue Balls Festival (Switzerland), Edinburgh Fringe Festival (Scotland), Montreux Jazz Festival (Switzerland), Skagenfest (Denmark), Nibe Festival (Denmark), Galway Sessions (Ireland), Sankt Hans Festival (Denmark), Labadoux Festival (Belgium), Arts Festival of Far North Norway (Norway), Canterbury Arts Festival (England), Place de Fagot Festival (Belgium), Rhythm Festival (England), Across The Tracks (England), Cropredy Folk Festival Fringe (England), Cathedral Quarter Arts Festival (Northern Ireland), Neun Naumbuerger Naechte (Germany), Open Flair Festival (Germany), Little Woodstock Festival (Germany), Geigenrock (Germany).

The band have released four independent albums, Life on the Border (2008), Fire in the Valley (2010), Black Dragon River (2014) and Live in Germany (2015).

== Members ==
- Jai Larkan - Vocals, Electric Guitar
- Rivkah Levi - Violin

== Discography ==
- Life on the Border (2008)
- Fire in the Valley (2010)
- Black Dragon River (2014)
- Live in Germany (2015)
