= Talking (A Flock of Seagulls song) =

"(It's Not Me) Talking"

Single by A Flock of Seagulls

from the album Listen
- Released: 29 May 1981; 8 April 1983 (remix); 26 August 1983 (re-recording)
- Recorded: 1981; 1983
- Genre: New wave
- Length: 4:33 (1981 version); 4:45 (remix version); 3:36 (1983 7" version); 5:00 (album version)
- Label: Cocteau; Jive
- Songwriters: Mike Score; Ali Score; Frank Maudsley; Paul Reynolds
- Producer: Bill Nelson

A Flock of Seagulls singles chronology
| "(It's Not Me) Talking" (1981) | "Telecommunication" (1981) |
| "Wishing (If I Had a Photograph of You)" (1982) | "(It's Not Me) Talking" (1983) | "Nightmares" (1983) |
| "Transfer Affection" (1983) | "(It's Not Me) Talking" (1983) | "The More You Live, the More You Love" (1984) |

"(It's Not Me) Talking"
- 1983 re-recording release cover

Music video
- "(It's Not Me) Talking" on YouTube

"(It's Not Me) Talking" is the debut single by British new wave band A Flock of Seagulls, originally recorded in 1981. It was re-recorded in 1983 and is featured on their second album Listen. The song is about a man who hears voices in his head, who believes that he is being contacted by aliens from outer space, and who cannot run away from his emotions; wherever he goes, the voice is there.

== Release ==
"(It's Not Me) Talking" was originally released on 29 May 1981 as the third release on producer Bill Nelson's independent label Cocteau Records and it peaked at number 45 on the UK Independent Singles Chart. Following this, A Flock of Seagulls signed to major label Jive and by the end of 1982 they had a top-ten hit in the US with "I Ran (So Far Away)" and in the UK with "Wishing (If I Had a Photograph of You)". In the wake of the latter's success in the UK, "(It's Not Me) Talking" was remixed and released as a 12-inch single on 8 April 1983 on the Cocteau label. It fared better than its original release, peaking at number 22 on the Independent Singles Chart, though it failed to make the UK Singles Chart Top 100, peaking at number 128. The song was re-recorded for the band's second album Listen and this version, released on Jive on 26 August 1983, made the Top 100, peaking at number 78.

== Music video ==
This music video was based on a 1951 science fiction classic film called The Day the Earth Stood Still. The producers wanted to use special effects that would be current, yet recall the look of 1950's cinema. The music video was filmed at Dawn's Animal Farm in New Jersey. With hundreds of acres of land and many exotic animals used in television commercials and film, it made for an interesting shoot. They hired Talking Dog Productions to build the spaceship. Talking Dog built the props used by Pink Floyd. For the lasers, they retained the services of holographic pioneer, Jason Sapan, of Holographic Studios in New York City. At that time, Sapan was also doing laser light effects. As they negotiated the laser effects, they realized that Sapan himself had the right look to act in the music video and hired him right there. Sapan built the red laser ray gun that Mike Score used.

=== First credits in a music video on MTV ===
The music video was the first shown on MTV to use on screen credits for the actors. The credits were shown next to the images of the actors at the end of the video. The credits listed were:

- Jason Sapan as "Sparks" Hopkins
- Peter Reynolds as Joey
- David York as Sergeant McGuire
- Ali Score as Prof. "Scottie" Frost
- Paul Reynolds as Duane
- Larry Friel as Major Dick Docherty
- Frank Maudsley as Rex Nolan
- Mike Score as "The Alien"

== Formats and track listing ==
7": Cocteau COQ 3 (1981)
| No. | Title | Length |
|---|---|---|
| 1. | "(It's Not Me) Talking" | 4:33 |
| 2. | "Factory Music" | 4:28 |

12": Cocteau COQ T 3 (1983)
| No. | Title | Length |
|---|---|---|
| 1. | "(It's Not Me) Talking" (remix) | 4:45 |
| 2. | "(It's Not Me) Talking" (instrumental) | 4:21 |
| 3. | "Factory Music" | 4:24 |

7": Jive 47 (1983)
| No. | Title | Length |
|---|---|---|
| 1. | "(It's Not Me) Talking" | 3:36 |
| 2. | "Tanglimara" | 4:29 |

12": Jive T 47 (1983)
| No. | Title | Length |
|---|---|---|
| 1. | "(It's Not Me) Talking" | 5:00 |
| 2. | "Tanglimara" | 4:29 |
| 3. | "The Traveller" (Live at the Ace, Brixton, 1983) | 3:29 |

== Chart positions ==
Original version

| Chart (1981) | Peak position |
|---|---|
| UK Indie (MRIB) | 45 |

Remix version

| Chart (1983) | Peak position |
|---|---|
| UK Indie (MRIB) | 22 |
| UK Singles (Gallup) | 128 |

Re-recorded version

| Chart (1983) | Peak position |
|---|---|
| UK Singles (Gallup) | 78 |
