= Wishing Well (album) =

Studio album by Monte Montgomery
- Released: July 31, 2001
- Recorded: June 2001
- Genre: Blues
- Length: 52:04
- Label: Antone's (Texas Music Group)
- Producer: Monte Montgomery; Carl Thiel

Monte Montgomery chronology
Mirror (1999)	Wishing Well (2001)	The Story Of Love (2003)

Wishing Well is a 2001 album by Monte Montgomery. It was produced by Montgomery and Carl Thiel.

== Track listing ==
1. "Tug of War" — (4:00)
2. "Wishing Well" — (4:30)
3. "I Know What You Want" — (4:18)
4. "Catch Me" — (4:56)
5. "Tomorrow Begins With Today" — (4:22)
6. "Erased" — (5:05)
7. "Broken Arms" — (4:20)
8. "Soldier at His Best" — (3:08)
9. "Bagpipe" — (2:33)
10. "Sunset Lullaby" — (3:48)
11. "All on Me" — (7:15)
12. "Radio Girl" — (3:27)

== Personnel ==
- Musicians:
  - Monte Montgomery — banjo, guitar, piano, arranger, vocals
  - Phil Bass — drums
  - Chris Maresh — bass
  - Michael Urdy — percussion
  - Jane Clark — fiddle
- Production:
  - Joe Gastwirt — mastering
  - Cynthia S. Kinney — design
  - Monte Montgomery — producer
  - Carl Thiel — co-producer, engineer, mixer
  - Todd V. Wolfson — photography
