= Wishing well (wedding) =

Donation box at wedding

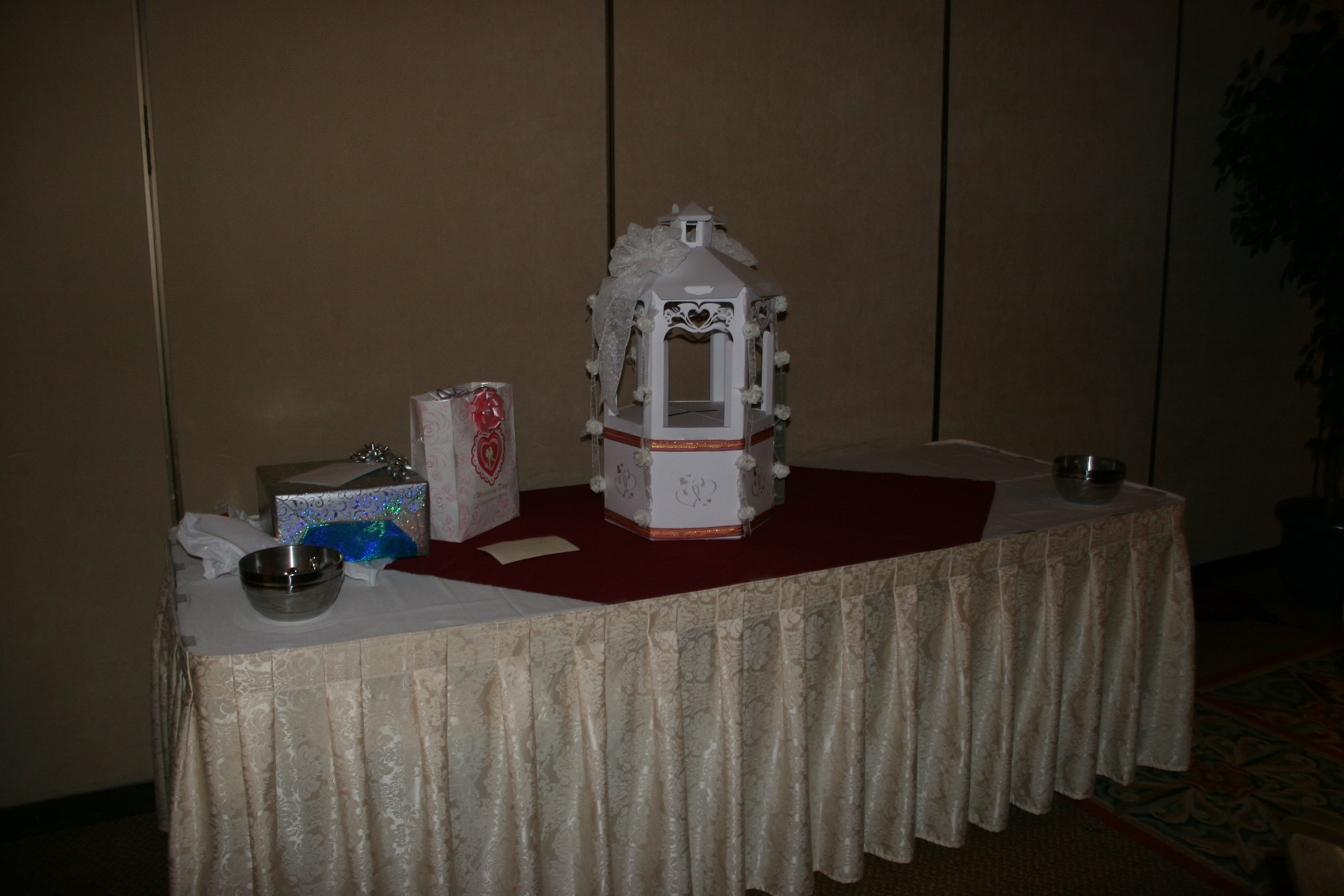
A wishing well on the gift table of a wedding reception

A wedding wishing well is a fancy donation box that gained popularity among bridal couples of certain countries (with one survey done in 2004 on Australia allegedly stating that up to 60% of weddings had them), who have often lived together before marrying, or who have been previously married, and do not need any of the traditional wedding gifts. They are also sometimes found at showers to collect monetary gifts for the guests of honor, as well as wedding wishes or marriage quotes, poems and messages of congratulations. Wishing wells at bridal showers are popular in the NYC/NJ area. Most people bring small gifts, such as spatulas or pot holders, to place in the wishing well. Wishing well gifts could be in addition to gifts bought from the bride’s registry.
