= Wishing Well: Water for the World =

U.S. non-profit organization

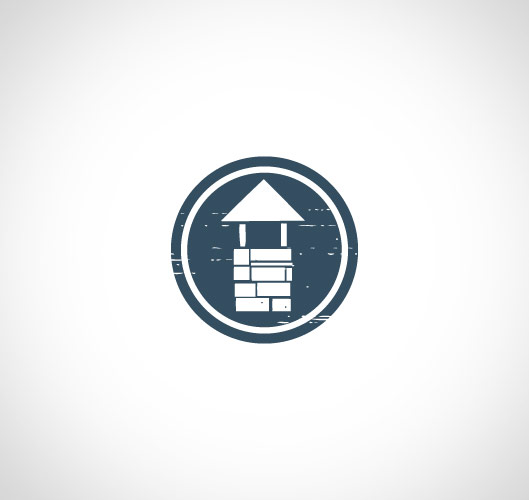
- Founded: 2006
- Founder: Ryan Groves, Jason Harvey, and Brendan Groves
- Type: Non-governmental organization
- Location: Oklahoma City
- Region served: 10 countries
- Website: www.wishforwater.com

Wishing Well: Water for the World is 501(c)(3) public charity, based in Oklahoma City, Oklahoma. Wishing Well: Water for the World was founded by college students at Pepperdine University in spring of 2006, the headquarters then moved to Oklahoma Christian University in the fall of 2006. Wishing Well: Water for the World empowers communities to transform their world by providing water to those in need.

== History ==
=== Pepperdine University ===
Students at Pepperdine raised the money for three water wells funded through Blood Water Mission. Their efforts were noticed by Laura Bush 2007, she said, "...Clean water, it's so simple. It's something all of us can do, even college students. We can go to a village and build a water well, and we know things are going to be better than they were. So far, students (at Pepperdine University) have raised about $14,000 for Wishing Well. Your efforts have already helped put a clean-water pump in a rural town near Nairobi, and this summer, two more will be installed—another in Kenya, and one in The Gambia, near a World Bible School. Because of your generosity, hundreds of children will have access to clean water—and the hope of good health."

=== Oklahoma Christian University ===
In fall of 2006, the headquarters of Wishing Well moved to Oklahoma Christian University in Oklahoma City, Oklahoma. Students at Oklahoma Christian University started fundraising by putting on a night of prayer and hosting a student art gallery on campus. Oklahoma Christian students Ryan Groves, Travis Hughes, Taylor Walling, Joshua Burgin, Whitney Parker, and Chase Layman used a portion of the funds raised to fly to Rwanda to film a documentary about the water crisis. Wishing Well grew, and they started chapters at schools and churches around the United States.

== National events ==
=== Town Hall Theater ===
Wishing Wells documentary, One Drop, premiered at the town hall theater on Time Square in New York City. The NON, Rock Wagon Live Painters, David Bowden Poetry and Ester Havens Photography were featured at the event.

=== Creativity World Forum ===
Wishing Well partnered with Toms shoes in November 2010, where 250 High School and College students walked barefoot for 2 miles through downtown Oklahoma City, carrying water jugs. They walked on stage where they were joined by Hanson, Sandi Patty and Eric Logan.

=== TedXOKC ===
Ryan Groves spoke about responding to crisis with creativity. He outlined using human empowerment to end the water crisis.

== Collaborations ==
WIshing well has funded several wells through Blood Water Mission, Living Water International and Charity: Water. Wishing Well has shared some of their photos from their Africa trip with Charity: Water and held events with them. Wishing Well partnered with Blake Mycoskie in a barefoot water walk in downtown Oklahoma City. Wishing Well has partnered with Water 4 to dig several well in Rwanda.

== Operations ==
Currently, Wishing Well is building hand dug wells that only use materials that are sourceable in country. When they go to dig a well, they teach residents how to build a well so they can start a well digging companies.
