= D.N.A. (A Flock of Seagulls song) =

Instrumental by A Flock of Seagulls

from the album A Flock of Seagulls
- Released: 1982
- Genre: Synth-pop
- Length: 2:30
- Label: Jive
- Songwriters: Mike Score; Ali Score; Frank Maudsley; Paul Reynolds
- Producers: Mike Howlett; Bill Nelson

"D.N.A." is a song written and performed by A Flock of Seagulls from their debut album, A Flock of Seagulls.

== Reception ==
The band earned a Grammy Award in 1983 for Best Rock Instrumental Performance.

Upon distinguishing the band with the award, at least one official at the National Academy of Recording Arts and Sciences remarked the song was "distinctive among other acts of the time...for its scope and ambition."

The band was not present at the Grammy Awards to accept the win, and instead were recording in Germany. Their manager told them about it, but they were unaware of what a Grammy was. Lead singer Mike Score has said of the frustrations that followed, "...it was a case of, 'Well, why weren't we there to pick it up?' Things like that, they start to cause pressure. It's like, 'We just got the most prestigious award in music, and the band was not told and not allowed to go and pick it up, be on TV, and say 'Thank you' to America for giving us a Grammy and putting us on the map.' That's another pressure from that side. They were like, 'They don't care about the Grammy... just keep them recording.'"
