= A Flock of Seagulls (album) =

1982 studio album by A Flock of Seagulls

Studio album by A Flock of Seagulls
- Released: 9 April 1982
- Recorded: Summer–Late Autumn 1981
- Studios: Battery, London
- Genres: New wave; synth-pop
- Length: 39:45
- Label: Jive
- Producers: Mike Howlett; Bill Nelson

A Flock of Seagulls chronology
A Flock of Seagulls (1982)	Listen (1983)

Singles from A Flock of Seagulls
- 1. "Telecommunication" Released: 18 September 1981; 2. "Modern Love Is Automatic" Released: 13 November 1981; 3. "I Ran (So Far Away)" Released: 5 March 1982; 4. "Space Age Love Song" Released: 28 May 1982

A Flock of Seagulls is the debut studio album by the English new wave band A Flock of Seagulls, released in April 1982 by Jive Records. It hit No. 10 on the US Billboard 200 and No. 32 on the UK Albums Chart. The album includes the single "I Ran (So Far Away)", which reached the top 10 in the United States and New Zealand, as well as No. 1 in Australia. "Space Age Love Song" also reached the US top 40.

On February 17, 2023, a 3CD deluxe edition of A Flock of Seagulls was released to commemorate its 40th anniversary. The 3CD featured a remastered version of the original album, B-sides, single versions, remixes, BBC sessions and a BBC concert from The Paris Theatre, London, which was originally transmitted in January 1982. It also featured sleeve notes by Classic Pop writer John Earls, including a new interview with lead singer and founding band member Mike Score. In addition, the remastered album was also available as a limited-edition transparent orange vinyl LP.

== Reception ==
Professional ratings
Review scores
Source	Rating
AllMusic	4.5/5 stars
The Encyclopedia of Popular Music	3/5 stars
The Rolling Stone Album Guide	3/5 stars
Smash Hits	5/10
Spin Alternative Record Guide	8/10
Tom Hull – on the Web	B+
The Village Voice	A−

The album received generally positive reviews upon its release and radio airplay. In his retrospective review for AllMusic, Tom Demalon gave the album 4.5 stars, calling it "great fun and a wonderful collection of new wave ear candy."

Critic Robert Christgau was also happy with it, giving it an A− and saying that it is "so transparently, guilelessly expedient that it actually provides the hook-chocked fun most current pop bands only advertise." Other reviews pointed out the bands "pioneering sounds, compelling hooks and undeniably addictive gimmicks."

John Gentile of Punknews.org has described the album as an example of early, experimental electronica, and stated that while its sound is "not strictly punk, or even post-punk," it contains elements of both genres and "uses them to their greatest extent."

The band, and particularly this album, were influential during the 1980s for their image and for their production techniques. Record producer Phil Spector called the album "phenomenal."

The album track "D.N.A." won a Grammy Award in 1983 for Best Rock Instrumental Performance.

== Track listing ==
All tracks are written by Mike Score, Ali Score, Frank Maudsley and Paul Reynolds.

Original UK LP
No.	Title	Length
1.	"Modern Love Is Automatic"	3:54
2.	"Messages"	2:57
3.	"I Ran (So Far Away)"	5:12
4.	"Space Age Love Song"	3:52
5.	"You Can Run"	4:30
6.	"Telecommunication"	2:33
7.	"Standing in the Doorway"	4:46
8.	"Don't Ask Me"	2:52
9.	"D.N.A."	2:30
10.	"Tokyo"	2:59
11.	"Man Made"	5:46
Total length:		41:10

2011 remastered CD reissue bonus tracks
No.	Title	Length
12.	"Pick Me Up"	3:11
13.	"Windows"	3:30
14.	"Tanglimara"	4:30
15.	"Intro"	3:24
Total length:		56:30

When compared to the UK version, the US version of the album dropped the track "Tokyo", used an edited version of "I Ran (So Far Away)", scrambled the track order, and also had minor mix differences or slightly earlier fade-outs for a few other tracks.

US track listing
No.	Title	Length
1.	"I Ran (So Far Away)"	3:58
2.	"Space Age Love Song"	3:45
3.	"You Can Run"	4:28
4.	"Don't Ask Me"	2:46
5.	"Messages"	2:51
6.	"Telecommunication"	2:31
7.	"Modern Love Is Automatic"	3:49
8.	"Standing in the Doorway"	4:41
9.	"D.N.A."	2:30
10.	"Man Made"	5:38

== Personnel ==
A Flock of Seagulls

- Mike Score – lead vocals, keyboards, additional rhythm guitar
- Paul Reynolds – lead guitar, backing vocals
- Frank Maudsley – bass, backing vocals
- Ali Score – drums, percussion

Production

- Mike Howlett – production (all tracks except "Telecommunication", "Tanglimara" and "Intro")
- Bill Nelson – production ("Telecommunication")
- Steve Lovell and A Flock of Seagulls – production ("Tanglimara" and "Intro")
- Mark Dearnley – engineering
- Mike Shipley – engineering
- "BillBo" – mastering

== Charts ==
=== Weekly charts ===
1982 weekly chart performance for A Flock of Seagulls
Chart (1982)	Peak position
Australia Albums (Kent Music Report)	19
Canada Top Albums/CDs (RPM)	5
German Albums (Offizielle Top 100)	26
New Zealand Albums (RMNZ)	6
Swedish Albums (Sverigetopplistan)	32
UK Albums (Official Charts)	32
US Billboard 200	10
US Rock Albums (Billboard)	8

2023 weekly chart performance for A Flock of Seagulls
Chart (2023)	Peak position
Belgian Albums (Ultratop Flanders)	127
German Albums (Offizielle Top 100)	25
Scottish Albums (Official Charts)	6
UK Independent Albums (Official Charts)	4

=== Year-end charts ===
1982 year-end chart performance for A Flock of Seagulls
Chart (1982)	Position
Australian Albums (Kent Music Report)	100
Canada Top Albums/CDs (RPM)	35
New Zealand Albums (RMNZ)	31
US Billboard 200	63

1983 year-end chart performance for A Flock of Seagulls
Chart (1983)	Position
US Billboard 200	94

== Certifications ==
Certifications for A Flock of Seagulls
Region	Certification	Certified units/sales
Australia (ARIA)	Gold	20,000^{^}
Canada (Music Canada)	Platinum	100,000^{^}
New Zealand (RMNZ)	Gold	7,500^{^}
United Kingdom (BPI)	Silver	60,000^{^}
United States (RIAA)	Gold	500,000^{^}
^{^} Shipments figures based on certification alone.
