= Listen (A Flock of Seagulls album) =

1983 studio album by A Flock of Seagulls

Studio album by A Flock of Seagulls
- Released: 29 April 1983
- Recorded: 1982–1983
- Studios: Conny Plank's Studio (Neunkirchen, West Germany)
- Genre: New wave
- Length: 42:02
- Label: Jive
- Producers: Mike Howlett; Bill Nelson

A Flock of Seagulls chronology
| A Flock of Seagulls (1982) | Listen (1983) | The Story of a Young Heart (1984) |

Singles from Listen
- 1. "Wishing (If I Had a Photograph of You)" Released: 22 October 1982; 2. "Nightmares" Released: 8 April 1983; 3. "Transfer Affection" Released: 10 June 1983; 4. "(It's Not Me) Talking" Released: 26 August 1983

Professional ratings
Review scores
| Source | Rating |
|---|---|
| AllMusic | 2.5/5 stars |
| The Encyclopedia of Popular Music | 3/5 stars |
| Smash Hits | 3/10 |
| Spin Alternative Record Guide | 8/10 |
| The Village Voice | B+ |

Listen is the second studio album by English new wave band A Flock of Seagulls, released on 29 April 1983 by Jive Records. It once again teamed the group with record producer Mike Howlett—who produced their self-titled debut album—except on "(It's Not Me) Talking", which was produced by Bill Nelson. The album includes the UK top-10 single "Wishing (If I Had a Photograph of You)". Other singles released from the album include "Nightmares" and "Transfer Affection". The face on the cover is that of the band's drummer, Ali Score.

== Reception ==
Listen received generally positive reviews. While Tom Demalon of AllMusic retrospectively felt the album was "sterile" and inconsistent, he found "Wishing (If I Had a Photograph of You)" to be "multilayered [and] hypnotic" while also praising "Nightmares" and "Transfer Affection".

Robert Christgau joked that the album's "aural pleasure" of "whooshes and zooms...and computerized ostinatos" could make Mr. Spock dance. He gave the album a B+ rating.

== Reissues ==
Listen has been released with varying track listings on at least three occasions. The original 1983 release, the 1992 CD Beehive label release, 2004 Superfecta Recordings release and the 2010 Cherry Red release.

The cassette version and the 1992 CD version (on the Beehive label) contain the original LP tracks in a slightly different order, with the additional tracks "Rosenmontag", "Quicksand", and "The Last Flight of Yuri Gagarin" interspersed (although the track listing for the CD edition, printed on the inserts and the disc itself, incorrectly follows the LP track listing above rather than reflecting the disc's actual contents).

The 2004 CD version contains the 10 LP tracks in the order, followed by three bonus tracks—"Committed", "Quicksand", and a 1983 live rendition of "I Ran (So Far Away)". "(It's Not Me) Talking" was originally recorded and released in 1981 as their debut single, two years before Listen was released on Nelson's Cocteau label. The 1983 version of the song used on Listen is a re-recorded version; as a consequence, the Cocteau version has yet to see a CD release.

The 2010 Cherry Red release has the 10 LP tracks in the order, followed by the B-sides "Committed", "Quicksand" and "Tanglimara" and the remixes of "Wishing (If I Had a Photograph of You)" and "Nightmares".

== Track listing ==
=== Original LP ===
All tracks are written by Mike Score, Ali Score, Frank Maudsley and Paul Reynolds.

| No. | Title | Length |
|---|---|---|
| 1. | "Wishing (If I Had a Photograph of You)" | 5:30 |
| 2. | "Nightmares" | 4:39 |
| 3. | "Transfer Affection" | 5:21 |
| 4. | "What Am I Supposed to Do" | 4:13 |
| 5. | "Electrics" | 3:36 |
| 6. | "The Traveller" | 3:27 |
| 7. | "2:30" | 1:00 |
| 8. | "Over the Border" | 5:04 |
| 9. | "The Fall" | 4:29 |
| 10. | "(It's Not Me) Talking" | 5:00 |
| Total length: | | 42:02 |

2010 Cherry Red CD reissue bonus tracks
| No. | Title | Length |
|---|---|---|
| 11. | "Wishing (If I Had a Photograph of You)" (extended version) | 9:36 |
| 12. | "Committed" | 5:37 |
| 13. | "Nightmares" (12″ version) | 5:05 |
| 14. | "Quicksand" | 4:43 |
| 15. | "Tanglimara" | 4:30 |

Total length 1:12:05

=== Cassette ===
Side one
| No. | Title | Length |
|---|---|---|
| 1. | "Wishing (If I Had a Photograph of You)" | 5:31 |
| 2. | "Nightmares" | 4:37 |
| 3. | "Transfer Affection" | 5:21 |
| 4. | "What Am I Supposed to Do" | 4:13 |
| 5. | "The Fall" | 4:30 |
| 6. | "Rosenmontag" | 4:03 |

Side two
| No. | Title | Length |
|---|---|---|
| 7. | "Electrics" | 3:33 |
| 8. | "The Traveller" | 3:26 |
| 9. | "2:30" | 0:59 |
| 10. | "Over the Border" | 5:04 |
| 11. | "(It's Not Me) Talking" | 5:00 |
| 12. | "Quicksand" | 4:44 |
| 13. | "The Last Flight of Yuri Gagarin" | 6:06 |

This track listing was also used for the 1992 Beehive Trading Ltd. CD reissue.

== Personnel ==
A Flock of Seagulls

- Mike Score – lead vocals, keyboards, guitar
- Paul Reynolds – lead guitar, backing vocals
- Frank Maudsley – bass guitar, backing vocals
- Ali Score – drums

Additional personnel

- Mike Howlett – producer (1–9)
- Bill Nelson – producer (10)
- Dave Hutchins – engineer, producer (A6)
- Conny Plank – producer (A6)
- Mike Score – producer (B7)
- Pete Watson – sleeve design, art direction
- Eric Watson – photography

== Charts ==
=== Weekly charts ===
Weekly chart performance for Listen
| Chart (1983) | Peak position |
|---|---|
| Australian Albums (Kent Music Report) | 90 |
| Canada Top Albums/CDs (RPM) | 12 |
| Dutch Albums (Album Top 100) | 47 |
| German Albums (Offizielle Top 100) | 14 |
| New Zealand Albums (RMNZ) | 5 |
| Swedish Albums (Sverigetopplistan) | 44 |
| UK Albums (Official Charts) | 16 |
| US Billboard 200 | 16 |
| US Rock Albums (Billboard) | 12 |

=== Year-end charts ===
Year-end chart performance for Listen
| Chart (1983) | Position |
|---|---|
| Canada Top Albums/CDs (RPM) | 52 |

== Certifications ==
Certifications for Listen
| Region | Certification | Certified units/sales |
|---|---|---|
| Canada (Music Canada) | Gold | 50,000^{^} |
^{^} Shipments figures based on certification alone.
