= Telecommunication (song) =

1981 single by A Flock of Seagulls

Single by A Flock of Seagulls

from the album A Flock of Seagulls
- B-side: "Intro"; "Tanglimara"
- Released: 18 September 1981
- Studio: Battery, London
- Genre: New wave; synth-pop
- Length: 2:31
- Label: Jive
- Songwriters: Mike Score; Ali Score; Frank Maudsley; Paul Reynolds
- Producer: Bill Nelson

A Flock of Seagulls singles chronology
"Talking" (1981)	"Telecommunication" (1981)	"I Ran (So Far Away)" (1982)

"Telecommunication" is a song by A Flock of Seagulls from their debut album A Flock of Seagulls, released in 1982. The song was released on 18 September 1981 as the band's second single. Although it did not chart on either the traditional United Kingdom or United States charts, it received considerable time on the dance charts. It peaked at number 19 on the Hot Dance Club Play chart in 1981, along with "Modern Love Is Automatic". The uptempo beat featuring power chords and heavy synth, along with the futuristic lyrics, has enabled the song to reach cult status. The song is noteworthy because the band eschewed the guitar-laden choruses many songs of this period had (e.g. power ballad), and instead relied on percussion arpeggios and multi-layered sounds.

== Lyrics ==
The song details types of energy transmitted across time and space. The first line mentions "ultraviolet..radio light..to your solar system..." indicating someone or something is attempting to communicate across the galaxy. In astronomy, UV light is emitted by very hot objects. A motif in the band's lyrics is alien life forms (with their debut album being essentially a rock opera about alien abduction) and futuristic technology. The song also includes references to nuclear energy and wireless communication.

== Critical reception ==
Upon its release, Paul Colbert of Melody Maker praised "Telecommunication" as a "superb single" that "ow[es] a lot of its wing power to Bill Nelson's hand at the helm". He added, "It's more of a picture than a record – you can see the whole song developing under your eyes until it trashes the canvas and rips it up in your face, so you put it on again."

== Formats and track listing ==
7-inch single (UK)

1. "Telecommunication" – 2:31
2. "Intro" – 3:23

12-inch single (UK)

1. "Telecommunication" – 2:31
2. "Intro" – 3:23
3. "Tanglimara" – 4:33

== Charts ==
Chart (1981)	Peak position
UK Singles Top 100 (Record Business)	75

== See also ==
- Alien abduction
- Concept album
- New wave music
- Phil Spector
- Wall of Sound
