= Wishing (If I Had a Photograph of You) =

1982 single by A Flock of Seagulls

Single by A Flock of Seagulls

from the album Listen
- B-side: "Committed"
- Released: 22 October 1982
- Recorded: 1982, Compass Point Studios
- Genre: Synth-pop
- Length: 4:09 (7" version); 5:29 (Album version); 9:34 (Extended version)
- Label: Zomba Records
- Songwriters: Mike Score, Ali Score, Frank Maudsley and Paul Reynolds
- Producer: Mike Howlett

A Flock of Seagulls singles chronology
"Space Age Love Song" (1982)	"Wishing (If I Had a Photograph of You)" (1982)	"Nightmares" (1983)

"Wishing (If I Had a Photograph of You)" is a 1982 song by A Flock of Seagulls, the opening song and only hit single from their second album Listen.

== Background ==
The song exemplifies "synth-pop's spaced-out loneliness" and yearning for imagined, absent lovers, and is noted for its Wall of Sound-styled layer of synthesizer padding – a "multi-layered, hypnotic song", according to AllMusic.

According to lead singer Mike Score, "Wishing" was based on a real person. When recalling the experience with this person, he said, "It was the eve of the first trip we ever took to America, and I had met a girl. We went out for the night, and I didn't want to forget her, so I said, 'We're going on tour and I'll be back. I'd like to get a photograph of you, if I could get one.' And she said, 'No, because you're going to go on to be famous and you'll forget me.'"

== Formats ==
7" Jive 25 (UK) – 1982

No.	Title	Length
1.	"Wishing (If I Had a Photograph of You)"	4:00
2.	"Committed"	2:50

12" Jive T25 (UK) – 1982

No.	Title	Length
1.	"Wishing (If I Had a Photograph of You) (Long Version)"	9:08
2.	"Committed"	5:34
3.	"Wishing (If I Had a Photograph of You) (Short Version)"	4:57

12" Jive VJ 12014 (US) – 1982

No.	Title	Length
1.	"Wishing (If I Had a Photograph of You)"	6:03
2.	"The Flight of Yuri Gagarin"	7:03
3.	"Rosenmontag"	8:01
4.	"Committed (Extended Version)"	5:34

CD August Day 41 (UK) – 2019

No.	Title	Length
1.	"Wishing (If I Had a Photograph of You) [Extended Remix]"	8:34
2.	"Wishing (If I Had a Photograph of You) [Ilya Santana Remix]"	6:08
3.	"Wishing (If I Had a Photograph of You) [Soda Pimps Remix]"	4:06
4.	"Wishing (If I Had a Photograph of You) [Chris Coco Dub]"	6:52
5.	"Wishing (If I Had a Photograph of You) [Extended Instrumental]"	8:34
6.	"Wishing (If I Had a Photograph of You) [Ilya Santana Instrumental Remix]"	6:08
7.	"Wishing (If I Had a Photograph of You) [Orchestral Version]"	5:32

== Chart and certifications ==
Unlike the band's 1982 hit "I Ran (So Far Away)", largely a United States and Australian hit, "Wishing" performed strongly in the band's home country, the United Kingdom, and reached the top 10 of the UK Singles Chart; in the US, it reached the top 30 on the Billboard Hot 100 in mid-1983. It was popular in South Africa, reaching No. 8.

=== Weekly charts ===
Chart (1982–1983)	Peak position
Australian Kent Report	46
Canada Top Singles (RPM)	10
France (SNEP)	1
Germany Singles Chart	37
Irish Singles Chart	6
New Zealand RIANZ Singles Chart	33
South African Singles Chart	8
UK Singles Chart	10
US Billboard Hot 100	26
US Billboard Mainstream Rock Tracks	3
US Billboard Hot Dance Club Play	26
US Cash Box Top 100	35

=== Year-end charts ===
Chart (1983)	Position
Canada Top Singles (RPM)	82

=== Certifications ===
Certifications for Wishing (If I Had a Photograph of You)
Region	Certification	Certified units/sales
United Kingdom (BPI)	Silver	250,000^{^}
^{^} Shipments figures based on certification alone.
