= I Ran (So Far Away) =

1982 single by A Flock of Seagulls

Single by A Flock of Seagulls

from the album A Flock of Seagulls
- B-side: "Pick Me Up"
- Released: 5 March 1982
- Recorded: 1981
- Studio: Battery, London
- Genre: New wave; post-punk
- Length: 5:07 (album version); 3:58 (video version); 3:43 (radio edit)
- Label: Jive
- Songwriters: Mike Score; Ali Score; Frank Maudsley; Paul Reynolds
- Producer: Mike Howlett

A Flock of Seagulls singles chronology
"Telecommunication" (1981)	"I Ran (So Far Away)" (1982)	"Space Age Love Song" (1982)

Music video
- "I Ran" on YouTube

"I Ran (So Far Away)"
A 26-second sample of "I Ran (So Far Away)" demonstrating the guitar echo effect and the alien abduction lyrics.

"I Ran (So Far Away)", also released as "I Ran", is a song by the English new wave band A Flock of Seagulls. It was released on 5 March 1982 as their third single and it was the second single from their eponymous debut studio album. It topped the chart in Australia, and reached number seven in New Zealand and number nine in the United States. It peaked at number 31 in Germany. In the band's home country of the United Kingdom it reached number 43. However, the song was certified silver by the BPI.

In an article for Rolling Stone titled, "Anglomania: The Second British Invasion", Parke Puterbaugh wrote of the impact of the song's music video on its US chart success, "Fronted by a singer-synth player with a haircut stranger than anything you'd be likely to encounter in a month of poodle shows, A Flock of Seagulls struck gold on the first try."

== Recording and composition ==
Lead vocalist Mike Score says that there were two main sources of inspiration for "I Ran (So Far Away)". The members of A Flock of Seagulls would regularly visit Eric's Club in Liverpool, where one of the bands had a song called "I Ran". Score noted that because A Flock of Seagulls would rehearse right after returning from Eric's, the song title and chorus may have got stuck in his head. Another idea came from a poster at a Zoo Records office. The band had gone there with the intent of securing a recording contract, and they wanted to use the poster, which featured a man and a woman running away from a flying saucer, as the cover for their first album, A Flock of Seagulls (1982). This depiction also helped spark the song's unusual space-like lyrics.

"I Ran (So Far Away)" was recorded at Battery Studios in London with producer Mike Howlett. It is a new wave and synth-pop song, with a run time of five minutes and seven seconds. According to the sheet music, the song moves at a quick tempo of 145 beats per minute. With a chord progression of Am-G-Am-G in the verses and F-G-Am in the choruses, the song is written in the key of A minor. The F-G-Am chord progression in the chorus is "distinctive and unusual in a pop song", but dates back to Romantic-era music.

During the song's introduction and musical interludes, short guitar riffs are played, which make use of echo. Guitarist Paul Reynolds had joined the band after the music was already written, so the short guitar riffs were added for Reynolds to play.

In the lyrics, Score describes a young woman "highlighted against the Aurora Borealis [sic], apparently as if appearing from space". This explains why the women in the music video are wearing costumes consistent with a science fiction theme. Score is frightened by this woman and responds by running "so far away ... both night and day", but finally concludes that "[he] can't get away". In more abstract terms, the song can be interpreted as a "metaphorical acknowledgment that sometimes one cannot escape love and physical attraction". However, it is never explained in the song and the music video why the song is referring to one woman, but the music video shows two identically dressed women.

== Music video ==
In an interview for Greg Prato's 2011 book, MTV Ruled the World: The Early Years of Music Video, Mike Score had recalled of his memories filming the "I Ran" music video: "[The 'I Ran' video] is just basically being stupid. [Laughs] You know, 'Stand here, the camera is going to be in the middle, and you're going to try and do something.' And, of course, we had no idea what to do in a video. Videos were not the 'mini-movies' yet. If it was up to the band, we probably would have just stood there in our wild gear and gone, 'OK, we'll just pretend to play.' But they wanted a little bit more, a little bit more angular and quirky. It seems to me that all the early videos had to be quirky. I guess nobody was taking them seriously until somebody dropped a million dollars on one."

== Track listing ==
7" Jive VS 102 (US) – 1982

No.	Title	Length
1.	"I Ran (So Far Away)"	3:56
2.	"Pick Me Up"	3:06

12" Jive T14 (UK) – 1982

No.	Title	Length
1.	"I Ran (So Far Away)"	5:02
2.	"Messages"	2:50
3.	"Pick Me Up"	3:07

CD August Day 40 (UK) – 2018

No.	Title	Length
1.	"I Ran (So Far Away) [Orchestral Version]"	6:22
2.	"I Ran (So Far Away) [Main Version]"	5:03
3.	"I Ran (So Far Away) [Long And Expanded Remix]"	7:32
4.	"I Ran (So Far Away) [Orchestral Extended Remix Instrumental]"	7:52
5.	"I Ran (So Far Away) [BRS Vocal Remix]"	7:26
6.	"I Ran (So Far Away) [Daniele Baldelli & DJ Rocca Hypno Vocal Mix]"	6:04
7.	"I Ran (So Far Away) [Daniele Baldelli & DJ Rocca Presto Instrumental Mix]"	6:08
8.	"I Ran (So Far Away) [Long And Expanded Remix Instrumental]"	7:32
9.	"I Ran (So Far Away) [Main Version Instrumental]"	5:01
10.	"I Ran (So Far Away) [Situation Dubside Remix]"	6:00

== Single release and legacy ==
The single was promoted by a distinctive music video directed by Tony van den Ende in which the band members performed in a room covered in aluminum foil and mirrors. The cameras used to film the video are clearly visible in many of the background reflections, their stands also covered in foil. The video is an homage to Brian Eno and Robert Fripp's (No Pussyfooting) album cover, which was also portrayed by the Strokes in the video for their single, "The End Has No End," two decades later. The video received heavy rotation on MTV in the summer of 1982, and helped the single to become a hit.

The band toured the United States extensively to promote the single, supporting Squeeze on their 1982 tour. As well as reaching number 9 on the Billboard Hot 100, "I Ran" peaked at number 3 on the Top Tracks chart and number 8 on the Hot Dance Club Play chart. Subsequently, the album reached number 10 on the Billboard 200.

The song was featured on the soundtrack of 2002 video game Grand Theft Auto: Vice City and played a prominent role in its TV advertisement, raising public awareness of it among a new generation of listeners.

American pop-punk band Bowling for Soup recorded a cover of the song as a bonus track for the 2003 re-release of their album Drunk Enough to Dance. This version served as the theme song for DIC Entertainment's dub of the anime Saint Seiya (renamed Knights of the Zodiac).

The song is one of six featured songs selected for the EPCOT enclosed roller coaster Guardians of the Galaxy: Cosmic Rewind at Walt Disney World.

=== Iran word play ===
With its abbreviated title and beginning of its chorus matching how some Americans pronounce Iran (IPA: /aɪˈræn/ or eye-RAN), the song was heard by Americans as "punningly political at a time when Iran itself was making headlines around the clock". The song, the music video, and the band were an "irresistible" package for American audiences, and by the summer of 1982, "America was clutching A Flock of Seagulls to its heart". According to comedian Maz Jobrani, the release of the song right after the Iran hostage crisis was a "disaster" for Iranian-American children like himself (then 10 years old). They were cruelly teased by other American children with the song's misheard chorus: "I-ran, I-ran so far away [sic]".

This word play issue was highlighted again in the fall of 2007, when the long-running American television show Saturday Night Live ran a parody version of the song that expressly mocked current Iranian policies like Holocaust denial.

== Charts ==
=== Weekly charts ===
Chart (1982)	Peak position
Australia (Kent Music Report)	1
Canada Top Singles (RPM)	26
Germany (GfK)	31
Netherlands (Single Top 100)	46
New Zealand (Recorded Music NZ)	7
UK Singles (Official Charts)	43
US Billboard Hot 100	9
US Billboard Dance/Disco Top 80	8
US Billboard Mainstream Rock Tracks	3
US Cash Box	14

=== Year-end charts ===
Chart (1982)	Rank
Australia (Kent Music Report)	15
New Zealand (Recorded Music NZ)	31
US Billboard Hot 100	67
US Cash Box	89
US Top Disco/Dance Singles/Albums	13

== Certifications ==
Region	Certification	Certified units/sales
Australia (ARIA)	Gold	50,000^{^}
New Zealand (RMNZ)	Platinum	30,000^{‡}
United Kingdom (BPI)	Gold	400,000^{‡}
^{^} Shipments figures based on certification alone.^{‡} Sales+streaming figures based on certification alone.

== See also ==
- List of number-one singles in Australia during the 1980s
