= Babitz =

Babitz is a surname. Notable people with the surname include:

- Eve Babitz (1943–2021), American visual artist and author
- Sol Babitz (1911–1982), American violinist, musicologist, teacher, writer, and pioneer of historically informed performance
