= Part 2 (Brix & the Extricated album) =

Studio album by Brix & the Extricated
- Released: 22 September 2017
- Recorded: 2017
- Genre: Post-punk
- Label: Blang Records
- Producer: John Reynolds

Brix & the Extricated chronology
Part 2 (2017)	Breaking State (2018)

Part 2 is the debut studio album by Brix & the Extricated, released on 22 September 2017 on Blang Records.

The album was made available on black or clear vinyl, CD and download. A video for the track "Damned For Eternity" was filmed by the documentary maker Dan Edelstyn.

== Critical reception ==
It was released to critical acclaim, awarded 9/10 by Marc Burrows of Drowned in Sound, who, acknowledging that three of the band are ex-Fall members, wrote "the new songs are what really impress, glowing with a sparky freshness few saw coming. Groups made from former members of another band aren’t meant to transcend the nostalgia circuit." It was also favourably reviewed by Uncut and Q.

== Track listing ==
All songs written by Brix & the Extricated / Brix Smith

1. "Pneumatic Violet"
2. "Feeling Numb"
3. "Something to Lose"
4. "Hotel Blöedel"
5. "Damned for Eternity"
6. "Moonrise Kingdom"
7. "Teflon"
8. "Valentino"
9. "LA"
10. "Time Tunnel"
11. "Hollywood"

Special Edition (CD)

1. "Pneumatic Violet"
2. "Feeling Numb"
3. "Something to Lose"
4. "Hotel Bloedel"
5. "Damned for Eternity"
6. "Moonrise Kingdom"
7. "Teflon"
8. "Valentino"
9. "LA"
10. "Time Tunnel"
11. "Hollywood"
12. "Faced With Time"
13. "US 80's 90's (live)"
14. "Temporary Insanity"
15. "Moonrise Kingdom (Harmonic Convergence)"

Special Edition (DVD)

1. "Uncaged"

== Personnel ==
Brix & the Extricated

- Brix Smith Start - vocals, guitar
- Steve Hanley - bass guitar
- Paul Hanley - drums
- Steve Trafford - guitar, vocals
- Jason Brown - guitar
