= Paint Work (song) =

Song by The Fall
- Released: 23 September 1985
- Recorded: June–July 1985
- Studio: The Music Works, London
- Genre: Neo-psychedelia; post-punk; post-rock; tape music; collage
- Length: 6:38
- Label: Beggars Banquet Records
- Songwriters: Mark E. Smith, Brix Smith, Karl Burns
- Producer: John Leckie

"Paint Work" (often written as "Paintwork") is a 1985 song by the English post-punk band The Fall which first appeared on their album This Nation's Saving Grace. Widely considered the high-point of the album, the track was described in 2019 as "absolutely sublime" by Vulture, and as a piece of psychedelic music in 2011 by critic Mick Middles.

== Music ==
The song features psychedelic stylings as well as tape collaging techniques, the latter of which were partially accidental. Smith's stream of consciousness lyrics reply on the refrain "hey Mark", while Karl Burns' drums alternate between drum machine cymbal crashes and live drumming, and Craig Scanlon's meandering lead guitar lines. Credited to both Smith and Brix, it blends studio takes of the song with sections recorded on a four track in Simon Rogers' flat, and audio from Smith's dictaphone, often switching abruptly. During the mixing, Smith took the master tape home and accidentally erased part of the track with a snippet from a documentary he was listening to from an Open University lecture by the astronomer Alan Cooper titled "How do red giants make Carbon?". According to Smith, he was "watching telly and singing along to the song after I'd played it, while [his home tape machine] was recording." The sudden jump between studio recordings and sudden inserts of home-taped passages fits the mood of the track, and he and Leckie decided to orient the final version of the song around this technique. Smith said "It fits in really good, you can't contrive something like that."

== Lyrics ==
According to Brix, both "Paint Work" and the TNSG album track "My New House" were both written about the house in Sedgley Park she had just bought with Mark. According to Brix "Hey Mark, you're messing up the paintwork" is something the decorator said. Smith said in a 1986 interview that the song lyrics contains "personal jottings and bits, but there's a lot there about England compared to Europe; how if you're not some flag-waving moron you don't fit in. This wasn't what England was about - it was about individuals. And that's what Paintwork was saying."

== Personnel ==
The Fall

- Mark E. Smith – vocals
- Brix Smith – guitar
- Steve Hanley – bass guitar
- Craig Scanlon – guitar
- Karl Burns – drums
- Simon Rogers – keyboards

Technical

- John Leckie – production, engineering
- Joe Gillingham – engineering

== Sources ==
- Edge, Brian. Paintwork: Portrait of The Fall. London: Omnibus Press, 1989. ISBN 978-0-7119-1740-8
- Ford, Simon. Hip Priest: The Story of Mark E.Smith and the Fall. London: Quartet Books, 2002. ISBN 978-0-7043-8167-4
- Hanley, Steve. The Big Midweek: Life Inside The Fall. London: Route, 2014. ISBN 978-1-9019-2758-0
- Irvin, Jim (ed). The Mojo Collection: 4th Edition. London: Canongate Books, 2017. ISBN 978-1-8419-5973-3
- Norton, Tessa; Stanley, Bob. Excavate!: The Wonderful and Frightening World of The Fall . London: Faber & Faber, 2021. ISBN 978-0-5713-5833-5
- Pringle, Steve. You Must Get Them All: The Fall On Record. London: Route Publishing, 2022. ISBN 978-1-9019-2788-7
- Smith, Brix. The Rise, The Fall, and The Rise. London: Faber & Faber, 2017. ISBN 978-0-5713-2506-1
