= Cruiser's Creek =

Single by The Fall
- B-side: "L.A."
- Released: 8 November 1985
- Recorded: June–July 1985
- Studio: The Music Works, London
- Genre: Post-punk
- Length: 4:16
- Label: Beggars Banquet
- Songwriter(s): Mark E. Smith, Brix Smith
- Producer(s): John Leckie

The Fall singles chronology
"Couldn't Get Ahead" (1985)	"Cruiser's Creek" (1985)	"Living Too Late" (1986)

"Cruiser's Creek" (also commonly rendered "Cruisers Creek") is a 1985 single by the English Post-punk band The Fall. The music and lyrics were written by guitarist Brix Smith and lead vocalist Mark E. Smith during sessions in the lead up to recording their 8th album This Nation's Saving Grace, and it was released as single just after the album came out. The b-side of the single was album track "L.A." while the twelve-inch single version contains the song "Vixen", written and sung by Brix.

"Cruiser's Creek" was produced by John Leckie, who brought a cleaner and higher fidelity sound to the band's recordings compared to their earlier recordings. The song is the Fall's only song listed within Robert Dimery's reference book 1001 Songs You Must Hear Before You Die.

== Writing and recording ==
Cruiser's Creek was written during a period when Fall bassist and main music writer Steve Hanley was on a sabbatical from the band. In his absence, the newly recruited American guitarist Brix Smith came up with many of the riffs the band would use as the basis for new songs. As one of the earliest songs completed during the This Nation's... sessions, it further develops her introduction of melody and pop-sensibilities to the band's until then "primitive...post-punk sound".

This relatively commercial approach was further enhanced by John Leckie's production. Leckie had earlier produced their previous album The Wonderful and Frightening World Of... (1984), and has been described by MOJO as The Fall's "first truly skilled producer".

== Song ==
The song is built around a circular riff composed by guitarist Brix Smith on her red Rickenbacker, while the lyrics were written by vocalist Mark E. Smith and detail a sexually debauched office-party wherein the attendees may have died after the gas is left on, and was partly based on Mark's experiences working in an office on Manchester docks in the later 1970s. He said "Its a party lyric with a macabre twist".

Although the track retains the repetitive and looped aspect of their earlier work, Brix's guitar part reinforces the pop sensibility she brought to the group. Writing for The Guardian in 2014, critic Dave Simpson described the song as "leftfield and outsiderly, yet the insistent tune is surely as catchy as anything by the Beatles."

== Music video ==
The single was released on 8 November 1985. The song was accompanied by a music video, directed by both Mark and Cerith Wyn Evans, and stars the Australian performance artist and fashion designer Leigh Bowery wearing a polka dot dress. Smith described Bowery as resembling "a clerk on acid, like he was from some alternative world". The extras were hired after Smith called out for help from locals on the Virgin Records shop tannoy. He later admitted that the role of director lead him to barking orders through a megaphone, but saw it as a one off and that directing music videos was not something he wanted to do again.

== Reception ==
John Leland at Spin said the song was, "I kid you not — flat-out rock 'n' roll garage trash. Next, American beauty Brix is gonna have Mark E. covering Ventures songs."

== Sources ==
- Bryans, Chris. "Cruiser's Creek". In Dimery, Robert (ed.). 1001 Songs You Must Hear Before You Die (2nd ed.). London: Quintessence Editions, 2013. p. 566. ISBN 978-1-84403-770-4
- Edge, Brian. Paintwork: Portrait of The Fall. London: Omnibus Press, 1989. ISBN 978-0-7119-1740-8
- Ford, Simon. Hip Priest: The Story of Mark E.Smith and the Fall. London: Quartet Books, 2002. ISBN 978-0-7043-8167-4
- Hanley, Steve. The Big Midweek: Life Inside The Fall. London: Route, 2014. ISBN 978-1-9019-2758-0
- Irvin, Jim (ed). The Mojo Collection: 4th Edition. London: Canongate Books, 2017. ISBN 978-1-8419-5973-3
- Simpson, Dave. The Fallen: Life In and Out of Britain's Most Insane Group. London: Canongate, 2010. ISBN 978-1-84767-144-8
- Smith, Brix. The Rise, The Fall, and The Rise. Faber & Faber, 2017. ISBN 978-0-5713-2506-1
