= Julian Wasser =

American photographer

Julian Wolf Wasser (April 26, 1933 – February 8, 2023) was an American photographer. He is known for his work covering the Los Angeles arts scene during the 1960s and 70s. He was born in Bryn Mawr, Pennsylvania, and raised in the Bronx, and attended the Sidwell Friends school in Washington D.C., but settled down in Los Angeles after spending some time in a photographic reconnaissance unit in the US Navy. Some of his most famous photographs were seemingly informal photographs of celebrities, and his most notorious picture was a staged photo of the Dada artist Marcel Duchamp playing chess with an entirely nude writer Eve Babitz at the Pasadena Arts Museum. Wasser's photos were largely casual, taken in the 1960s in Los Angeles before TMZ and the paparazzi appeared, when (Wasser says) celebrities were more accessible.

== Career ==
As a teenager, Wasser started out photographing crime scenes in Washington D.C., and shooting small news items for the Washington Post. After graduating from the University of Pennsylvania, facing the draft, he enlisted in the Navy in 1956, serving as part of a photographic reconnaissance unit. In the 60s and 70s, he was a Los Angeles photographer for Time magazine. He continued to be active in LA through the 80s and 90s, serving as a freelance photographer for Eye on L.A., as well as other TV shows and magazines, and by 2011 was spending increasing amounts of time in Paris and Berlin.
