= Monday Evening Concerts =

Chamber music series in Los Angeles

- Location: Los Angeles, United States
- Start date: 1939; 87 years ago
- Website: www.mondayeveningconcerts.org

Monday Evening Concerts (MEC) is the world's longest-running series devoted to contemporary classical music. The concert series, based in Los Angeles, was originally envisioned as a forum for displaced European emigrés and Hollywood studio musicians. MEC has presented contemporary concerts continuously since.

== Founding ==
The organization launched its first season as “Evenings on the Roof,” A series of 12 concerts (6 programs, each performed twice) mixing classical and contemporary works, performed at the top floor of the Rudolf Schindler-designed home of Peter Yates and Frances Mullen in 1735 Micheltorena Street in Los Angeles. The series was priced at 50 cents per concert, or $3.00 for the complete series. Performers were drawn from world-class studio and classical musicians living in Los Angeles.

The first program (April 23, 1939) was all-Bartók, performed for an audience of nineteen spectators. Subsequent early programs were devoted to Frédéric Chopin, Alexander Scriabin, Charles Ives, Ferruccio Busoni, Erik Satie, Arnold Schoenberg, and keyboard music from the early Baroque era.

The initial vision for the series was to allow top musicians to program and perform according to their artistic interests without concern about audiences and financial matters; however, at the same time, the attitude to the public was open and welcoming.

== Artistic directors ==
Over the course of eight decades, Monday Evening Concerts has been led by five directors:

Name	Period
§ Peter Yates	1939–1954
§ Lawrence Morton	1954–1971
§ Dorrance Stalvey	1971–2005
§ Justin Urcis	2006–2015
§ Jonathan Hepfer	2015–present

=== Peter Yates ===
Peter Yates was a self-described passionate musical amateur. In addition to his career as a social worker in Los Angeles, Yates was a poet and music critic, contributing to the music column for John Entenza's Arts & Architecture magazine. Rather than seeing himself as an Artistic Director of Evenings on the Roof, he saw himself as a 'coordinator' of the series, which existed solely 'for the pleasure of the performers.' It was mainly through his intense efforts that the MEC organization and its concerts were established, with a specific vision, and series of programs.

Yates presented concerts in Los Angeles at his Micheltorena home, the Wilshire-Ebell Theater, and other venues. Starting with a humble audience of nineteen in 1939, some of the concerts at Wilshire-Ebell were attended by over one thousand people by the early 1950s.

During this era, Evenings on the Roof presented Portrait Concerts of J.S. Bach, Béla Bartók, Ludwig van Beethoven, Ferruccio Busoni, John Cage, Aaron Copland, Henry Cowell, Charles Ives, Ernst Krenek, Arnold Schoenberg, Franz Schubert, and Igor Stravinsky.

Other concerts focused on numerous early Baroque (pre-Bach), Classical/Romantic, and Modernist composers. Modernist composers with works presented included Béla Bartók, Alban Berg, Ferruccio Busoni, John Cage, Elliott Carter, Carlos Chavez, Aaron Copland, Charles Ives, Sergei Prokofiev, Sergei Rachmaninoff, Maurice Ravel, Dane Rudhyar, Dimitri Shostakovich, Gerald Strang, Igor Stravinsky, Ernst Toch, Heitor Villa-Lobos, Anton Webern,

Distinguished performers during this era included Sol Babitz, Richard Bühlig, John Cage, Robert Craft, Ingolf Dahl, Marni Nixon, Eudice Shapiro, Felix Slatkin, Leonard Stein, Josef Szigeti, and Paul Wittgenstein.

=== Lawrence Morton ===
Starting in 1954, Evenings on the Roof transitioned to a new director, and with this new leadership, the series changed its name. Thus, on September 20, 1954, Monday Evening Concerts was born, with the music scholar and critic Lawrence Morton as Director. On this program, the writer Aldous Huxley spoke about the poet Dylan Thomas before Robert Craft led the first performance of Igor Stravinsky's In Memoriam Dylan Thomas.

Morton was a seminal figure for classical/contemporary music in Southern California, best remembered for his leadership of both MEC and the early years of the Ojai Music Festival. His wide-ranging tastes resulted in MEC not only presenting new music but also numerous significant performances of music from the Medieval, Renaissance and Baroque periods. His close friendships with Igor Stravinsky and Pierre Boulez (who made his US conducting debut with MEC in 1957) shaped many of the aesthetic principles that guided Monday Evening Concerts during his directorship.

During his tenure at MEC, Morton presented concerts at the Wilshire-Ebell Theater, Plummer Park, and starting in 1965, at the newly opened Los Angeles County Museum of Art's (LACMA) Bing Theater, where Monday Evening Concerts became the museum's first resident music program.

Portrait Concerts during this era included: Béla Bartók, Lou Harrison, Joseph Haydn, Claudio Monteverdi, Arnold Schoenberg, Karlheinz Stockhausen, and Hugo Wolf.

Other composers significantly represented in the programming of this era include: J.S. Bach, John Blow, Carlo Gesualdo, Claude Le Jeune, Henry Purcell, Domenico Scarlatti, and Heinrich Schutz. The featured modern composers included Harrison Birtwistle, Sylvano Bussotti, Luigi Dallapiccola, Leon Kirchner, Rene Leibowitz, Luigi Nono, and Karlheinz Stockhausen.

Distinguished soloists, conductors and visiting artists associated with MEC during this era included: Cathy Berberian, Luciano Berio, Lukas Foss, Lawrence Foster, Severino Gazzelloni, Marilyn Horne, Karl Kohn, William Kraft, Andre Previn, Lalo Schifrin, Leo Smit, Michael Tilson Thomas (who for a while led an MEC touring ensemble), and David Tudor.

=== Dorrance Stalvey ===
With 34 years in post, the composer Dorrance Stalvey had the longest tenure as music director of Monday Evening Concerts at the Los Angeles Museum of Art. Under Stalvey's leadership, MEC branched out into bringing guest artists and ensembles from all over the world and enhanced the series' international reach. In addition to directing Monday Evening Concerts, Stalvey became the director of expanded music programming at LACMA, resulting in series with a wide variety of focuses including the Pro Musicis series (dedicated to early music), Ensembles in Residence (California E.A.R. Unit and Xtet) and Bing Concerts (typically for guest soloists and ensembles). The widening scope of these ancillary concert series led to Monday Evening Concerts narrowing its focus almost solely on contemporary music during the 1980s, 1990s, and 2000s.

Portrait Concerts during this era included: Earle Brown, Sylvano Bussotti, Steve Reich, and Frederic Rzewski. The concerts featured other composers, including Giovanni Pierluigi da Palestrina, Girolamo Frescobaldi, Jean Baptiste Loeillet, Heinrich Schutz. Modern music was also represented with Harold Budd, Sylvano Bussotti, Joan La Barbara, Helmut Lachenmann, Conlon Nancarrow, Olga Neuwirth, Wadada Leo Smith, Kaija Saariaho, and Iannis Xenakis.

Distinguished soloists, conductors and visiting artists from this era included Magnus Andersson, Nicholas Isherwood, Ursula Oppens, Richard Stoltzman, Charles Wuorinen, and Frank Zappa.

Visiting and resident ensembles included: Aeolian Chamber Players, Flux Quartet, Nexus Percussion, Steve Reich and Musicians, and Tashi.

=== Justin Urcis ===
Long-time director Dorrance Stalvey stepped down in 2005; in the same year, Monday Evening Concerts lost its contracts with the Museum of Art. MEC reorganized its operations, re-emerging as an independent organization led by arts administrator and amateur pianist Justin Urcis, and a board of fifteen members, including the Los Angeles Philharmonic executive director Ernest Fleischmann. After an opening sold-out concert at REDCAT, the principal home base for concerts became Herbert Zipper Concert Hall at the Colburn School. Seasons were reduced to between four and six programs per season from twelve.

Portrait Concerts during this era included: Hans Abrahamsen, Frank Denyer, Mauricio Kagel, Lewis Nielson, Charlemagne Palestine, and Galina Ustvolskaya. Other composers significantly represented included Harrison Birtwistle, György Kurtág, Jo Kondo, Jose Maceda, Salvatore Sciarrino, Horatiu Radulescu, Wolfgang von Schweinitz, and Jakob Ullmann.

Distinguished soloists, conductors and visiting artists associated with MEC during this era included Marino Formenti, and Richard Valitutto. Visiting ensembles during this period included: Asamisimasa, Calder Quartet, JACK Quartet, Ensemble Recherche, and Red Fish Blue Fish.

=== Jonathan Hepfer ===
Conductor, percussionist and curator Jonathan Hepfer took the helm in 2015. Under Hepfer, MEC's programming and production expanded with an emphasis on unconventional curatorial combinations, such as Steve Reich, Léonin and Pérotin.

In addition to MEC's traditional home of Zipper Concert Hall at the Colburn School, during this era, MEC has presented concerts at Hauser & Wirth, the Getty Museum, LAXART Gallery, BP Hall at Walt Disney Concert Hall, and the Wende Museum.

== MEC organization ==
Monday Evening Concerts is a not for profit company under section 501(c)(3) of local tax laws. The Board of Directors and President (Isaac Malitz) provide strategic governance, with an executive committee and professional staff managing day-to-day operations. Artistic matters are managed by the Artistic Director (Jonathan Hepfer).

MEC's work is focused on concerts and events. Some scholarly work is undertaken, primarily focused on documenting the long historical activities of the organisation.
