= Ojai Music Festival =

Annual classical music festival in California, United States

Coordinates: 34.4457°N 119.2455°W

- Genre: classical music
- Locations: Ojai, California, U.S.
- Years active: 1947-2019, 2021-
- Founders: John Leopold Jergens Bauer
- Website: ojaifestival.org

The Ojai Music Festival is an annual classical music festival in the United States. Held in Ojai, California (75 miles northwest of Los Angeles), for four days every June, the festival presents music, symposia, and educational programs emphasizing adventurous, eclectic, and challenging music, principally by contemporary composers. A secondary focus of the festival is the discovery or rediscovery of rare or little known works by past masters.

The primary performance venue is the Libbey Bowl, an open-air setting not far from the center of Ojai.

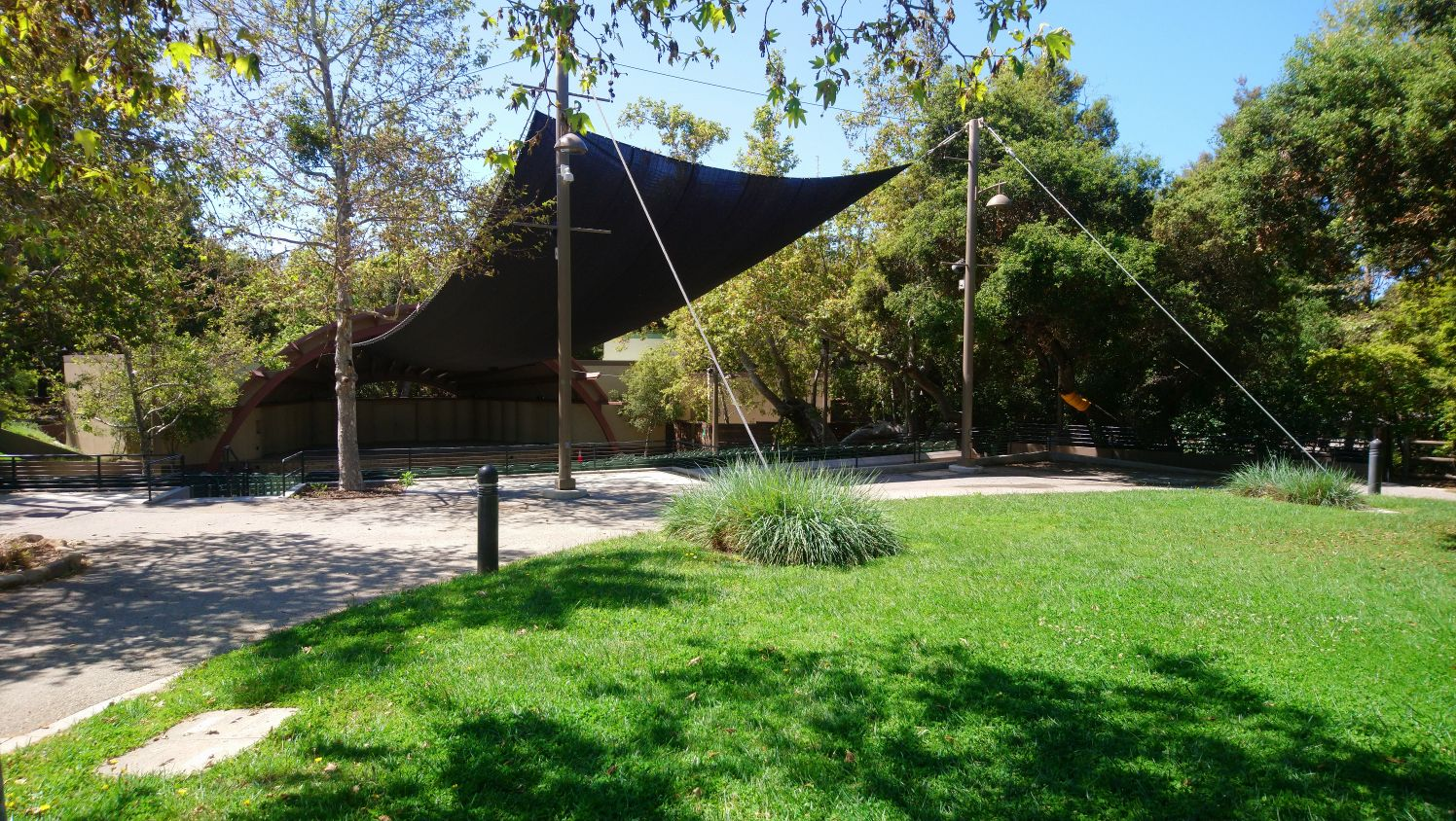
Libbey Bowl

== History ==
=== Background ===
Before the music festival itself was established, the Ojai valley had attracted artists, musicians and thinkers. In the early 1920s, a trust organized by Annie Besant, the head of the Theosophical Society, bought 40 acres (160,000 m^{2}) of land in the valley which eventually was used as the official residence of her young Indian protégé, Jiddu Krishnamurti. Krishnamurti proved to be a respected spiritual thinker in his own right, and Ojai became one of his bases. Throughout the 1930s and 1940s, his talks in the valley drew a diverse group of notable southern Californians including Igor Stravinsky, Greta Garbo, Christopher Isherwood, Bertolt Brecht, Thomas Mann, Charles Chaplin, Bertrand Russell, and Charles Laughton. The composer John Cage wrote to his lover in 1935, "I was walking and thinking of you in Ojai, an open space of country, and suddenly I knew what wildness was. I am sure there is something unexplainably and mysteriously sacred about the Valley, something including evil." The idyllic setting even famously served as Shangri-La in the 1937 Frank Capra film, Lost Horizon.

There was no festival in 2020.

=== Beginning the music festival ===
The Ojai Music Festival was founded in 1947 by John Leopold Jergens Bauer, a music aficionado from the east coast. It was originally intended to be a "Salzburg Festival of the West" with eight weeks of music, opera, dance, and theater; but while those ambitious early plans were never realized, a more modest festival developed. Mark Swed of the Los Angeles Times said:

Ojai's allure made it easy to attract not only name soloists but the best Hollywood musicians for its ensembles. By 1949, The New York Times was running a composite sketch of participants in that year's festival, illustrating the Juilliard String Quartet rehearsing, the pianist Shura Cherkassky performing and Thor Johnson conducting. Ladies in capes and fancy hats paraded. Bohos in sandals sat under oak trees.

=== Artistic directors ===
In 1954, Lawrence Morton was appointed as the festival's artistic director. A man of broad musical tastes, Morton was a visionary whose constant curiosity and unwavering integrity shaped the festival's future direction. Morton was already heading up the famously progressive Monday Evening Concerts in Los Angeles. Mark Swed said:

what [Morton] wanted was new plus old plus unusual. He was close to Stravinsky. At Ojai, he talked Copland into conducting for the first time. He brought the French composer Pierre Boulez to the Festival in 1967, when Boulez's career as a conductor was just beginning, and Boulez has been back six more times, most recently in 2003. [In 2005] I asked Boulez, who is 81, if he would ever return to Ojai. He said yes, he hoped so. . . .

Like wealthy patrons most places, Ojai's often have traditional tastes, and Morton pushed some donors too far in the '50s. He left for Paris in 1960 on a Guggenheim Fellowship, and the Festival immediately went pop with acts such as Anna Maria Alberghetti and Family. [According to other sources, Morton had received a cable from the new Board president instructing him to "cancel all contracts", which resulted in the cancellation of intended music director, Nadia Boulanger.]

But it quickly swung back to the other extreme. In 1962, when Luciano Berio was the composer in residence, he, Milton Babbitt and Gunther Schuller debated for four days the direction of music and where the 12-tone technique, jazz and tradition all fit in. The great jazz flutist and clarinetist Eric Dolphy played Edgard Varèse's flute solo, "Density 21.5", that spring.

Under Morton's leadership, the Ojai Festival began the practice of having the artistic director engage a different music director each year, building the scheduling around that person. Nine individuals have served:

- Lawrence Morton (1954–1970, 1981–1987)
- Gerhard Samuel (1971–1975)
- William Malloch (1978–1980)
- Jeanette O'Connor (1987–1990)
- Christopher Hunt (1991)
- Ara Guzelimian (1992–1997)
- Ernest Fleischmann (1998–2003)
- Thomas W. Morris (2004–2019)
- Ara Guzelimian (since 2020)

Whereas Fleischmann tended to organize each year's festival according to themes, Morris has eschewed the concept. As David Mermelstein reported:

"I'm not a big believer in too much dramaturgy", Morris says. "The idea of building programs or festivals around some kind of specific theme, I find not a compelling idea in general. You find some pieces that fit the theme well, and then you have to find something to round it out, and that can lead to some less good pieces being performed. There should be some rhyme or reason to programming, but it shouldn't be too restricted in its thinking."

=== Music directors ===
The festival has had collaborations with many highly regarded composers, conductors, directors, and musicians who have been the music director including Igor Stravinsky, Aaron Copland, Pierre Boulez, Robert Craft, Michael Tilson Thomas, Lukas Foss, John Adams, Peter Sellars, Esa-Pekka Salonen, Daniel Lewis, Kent Nagano, Simon Rattle, and Rhiannon Giddens

In recent years, instrumentalists such as Emanuel Ax, Mitsuko Uchida, Patricia Kopatchinskaja, Vijay Iyer, Matthias Pintscher, Pierre-Laurent Aimard, and the Emerson String Quartet have served as music director.

=== Resident artists: composers, soloists, ensembles, and others ===
In addition to the composers who have served as music director, many others have been resident artists at the festival including Luciano Berio, Milton Babbitt, Peter Maxwell Davies, Elliott Carter, Olivier Messiaen, David Del Tredici, Mauricio Kagel, and György Ligeti. More recently, Steve Reich, Magnus Lindberg, Thomas Ades, Mark-Anthony Turnage, and Osvaldo Golijov have been resident composers.

A diverse group of notable musicians have been part of the festival including the jazz musician Eric Dolphy, pianist/conductor James Levine, sitar player Ravi Shankar, soprano Dawn Upshaw, and mezzo-soprano Lorraine Hunt-Lieberson, to name just a few. Sol Babitz, the Festival's first concertmaster, was a confidant of Stravinsky, and Babitz's expertise in Baroque period performance practice and research into early music fascinated and influenced the composer. During the 1970s and 1980s, jazz was a featured part of every festival. Musicians and ensembles who appeared included such greats as Oscar Peterson, the Bobby Hutcherson Quartet, Milt Jackson, the Heath Brothers, Ray Brown, the Toshiko Akiyoshi - Lew Tabackin Big Band, and many others. The concerts were organized by two local board members, syndicated radio show host Fred Hall ("Swing Thing") and Lynford Stewart.

Since 1970, the Los Angeles Philharmonic has been a frequent participant in the festival. Other notable resident orchestras have included the Lyon Opera Orchestra, the Cleveland Orchestra, New World Symphony, Philharmonia Baroque, Atlanta Symphony, and St. Paul Chamber Orchestra. The "Ojai Festival Orchestra", composed of Southern California's most talented, sometimes legendary, studio musicians and freelance orchestral instrumentalists, has been the mainstay of the Ojai Festival over its lifespan. Many chamber groups and other ensembles have also been resident performers at the festival including the Juilliard String Quartet, the Tokyo String Quartet, the Kronos Quartet, the Emerson String Quartet, the Sequoia Quartet, the Pacific Chorale, Chanticleer, and Toimii. In addition, groups representing other musical genres have been features at the festival like Indian music, mariachi, Balinese music, and West African drum music.

In addition to musicians, the festival has hosted visual and performing artists of all kinds, most notably the potter Beatrice Wood, French artist Marcel Duchamp, and theater/opera director Peter Sellars. For many years, Ojai Festival posters were designed by renowned modern artists including Robert Rauschenberg, Kenneth Noland, Richard Diebenkorn, David Hockney, and Eliot Porter.

== Libbey Bowl ==
After a widespread effort by the Ojai community, the old Libbey Bowl shell and building, originally built in 1957 by local volunteers, was demolished in July 2010. The new Libbey Bowl, opened for the 65th music festival in June 2011, features several acoustic, structural, environmental, and aesthetic improvements, while still retaining the familiar, rustic characteristics of the original structure.
