= Eve Babitz =

American artist and author (1943–2021)

- Babitz in 1959
- Born: May 13, 1943; Los Angeles, California, U.S.
- Died: December 17, 2021 (aged 78); Los Angeles, California, U.S.
- Occupations: Novelist; essayist
- Writing career
- Period: 1970–2021
- Genres: Memoir, short story
- Notable works: Eve's Hollywood (1974); Slow Days, Fast Company (1977); Sex and Rage (1979)
- Website: evebabitz.com

Eve Babitz (May 13, 1943 – December 17, 2021) was an American author and visual artist best known for her semi-fictionalized memoirs and her involvement in the cultural milieu of Los Angeles in the 1970s.

== Early life and education ==
Babitz was born in Hollywood, California, the daughter of Mae Babitz (1911-2003) (baptized as Lily May Josephine Laviolette), an artist, and Sol Babitz, a classical violinist on contract with 20th Century Fox (first violinist for the Twentieth Century Fox Orchestra and first violinist for the Los Angeles Philharmonic). Her father was of Russian Jewish descent and her mother had Cajun (French) ancestry. She had one sister, Mirandi. When Mirandi was eight months old, and Eve was three, Eve was so jealous that she set Mirandi's crib on fire, and Mirandi had to have plastic surgery on her hand.

Babitz's parents were friends with the composer Igor Stravinsky, who was her godfather. Babitz grew up near Hollywood and Vine. Family picnic guests included Greta Garbo and Charlie Chaplin.

She graduated from Hollywood High School in 1961, and attended a year and half at Los Angeles City College.

When Eve was 18, her father lost his contract with 20th Century Fox. Igor Stravinsky wrote a letter, which led to Sol Babitz getting a Fulbright scholarship to study Bach in Germany and a Ford Foundation fellowship. Eve had finished Hollywood High School, and Eve and Mirandi began living in 1961 in Paris together while their parents went to Germany.

On August 6, 1962, Eve, living with her family in Europe, saw headlines of Marilyn Monroe's death in newspapers in Nîmes, France, and placed a call to her married director boyfriend, who arranged for a flight back to Los Angeles.

== Career ==
"When I was 15 years old, I bought and filled my first 36 DD bra". - Eve Babitz

In 1963, she came to public notice through Julian Wasser's photographs (at least 25) for Time Magazine, of the artist Marcel Duchamp on the occasion of a retrospective at the Pasadena Art Museum, which featured a nude, 20-year-old Babitz playing chess with Duchamp at the Pasadena Art Museum. Babitz was having an affair at the time with Walter Hopps, the show's curator. The photographs are described by the Smithsonian Archives of American Art as being "among the key documentary images of American modern art".

Babitz began her independent career as an artist, working in the music industry for Ahmet Ertegun at Atlantic Records, making album covers.

After failing to get her first novel, Travel Broadens, published, Babitz designed album covers before finding appreciation as a talented chronicler of L.A. sleaze.

From 1966 to 1967, she lived in New York City, where she worked as a publicist and/or the office manager of the East Village Other.

In New York Babitz saw the art of Joseph Cornell, and began creating collages. Her collages and photography became album covers for Buffalo Springfield's 1967 album Buffalo Springfield Again, Linda Ronstadt (Heart Like a Wheel), and The Byrds, and illustrations for the Los Angeles Times.

In 1972, with Joan Didion's help, Babitz's "The Sheik" was published in Rolling Stone, about her life at Hollywood High School.

In summer 1978, Babitz was a staff writer for Michael O'Donoghue and his three late-night special project in association with Lorne Michaels, for The War of the Insect Gods and Mr. Mike's Mondo Video.

Her articles and short stories appeared in Ms., The Village Voice, Vogue, Esquire, and Cosmopolitan. She was the author of several books including Eve's Hollywood, Slow Days, Fast Company, Sex and Rage, Two By Two, L.A. Woman, and Black Swans. Transitioning to her particular blend of fiction and memoir beginning with Eve's Hollywood, Babitz's writing of this period is marked by the cultural scene of Los Angeles during that time, with numerous references to and interactions with the artists, musicians, writers, actors, and sundry other iconic figures that made up the scene in the 1960s, 1970s, and 1980s. Novelists Joseph Heller and Bret Easton Ellis were fans of her work, with the latter writing, "In every book she writes, Babitz’s enthusiasm for L.A. and its subcultures is fully displayed."

“She’s known as ‘The Dowager Groupie.’” - John Gregory Dunne

Despite her literary output, which drew frequent comparisons to Joan Didion and was critically acclaimed, much of the press about Babitz emphasized her various romantic associations with famous men. These include singer/poet Jim Morrison, artists (and brothers) Ed Ruscha and Paul Ruscha, the museum curator Walter Hopps, the comedian and writer Steve Martin, the actor Harrison Ford, and the writer Dan Wakefield, among others. Ed Ruscha included her in Five 1965 Girlfriends (Walker Arts Center's Design Journal, 1970). Because of this, she has been likened to Edie Sedgwick, Andy Warhol's 1965 protégée at The Factory in New York City.

In Hollywood’s Eve: Eve Babitz and the Secret History of L.A., biographer Lili Anolik writes, "passing herself off as a groupie allowed Eve to infiltrate, edge into territory from which she'd otherwise have been barred." Reviewing this biography for The Nation, journalist Marie Solis wrote, "Babitz didn’t live a life free from patriarchy, but modern-day readers might surmise that she found a way to outsmart it. Despite her proximity as a Hollywood insider to the powerhouses of male celebrity, she rarely succumbed to their charms; instead, she made everyone play by her own rules."

In 1997, Babitz was severely injured while in her car when she accidentally dropped a lit match onto a gauze skirt, which ignited and melted her pantyhose beneath it. While her lower legs were protected by the sheepskin Ugg boots she was wearing, the accident caused life-threatening third-degree burns to over half of her body. Because she had no health insurance, friends and family organized a fund-raising auction to pay her medical bills. Friends and former lovers donated cash and artworks to help pay for her long recovery. Babitz became somewhat more reclusive after this incident, but was still willing to be interviewed on occasion. In a 2000 interview with Ron Hogan of Beatrice magazine, Babitz said, "I've got other books to do that I'm working on." When Hogan asked what those books would be about, Babitz replied: "One's fiction and the other's nonfiction. The nonfiction book is about my experiences in the hospital. The other's a fictionalized version of my parents' lives in Los Angeles, my father's Russian Jewish side and my mother's Cajun French side." These books had not been published as of 2019.

Babitz died of Huntington's disease at Ronald Reagan UCLA Medical Center in Los Angeles on December 17, 2021, at age 78.

== Resurgence ==
Babitz enjoyed a renaissance from 2010 due in part to the reissuing of much of her work by publishers including New York Review Books, Simon & Schuster and Counterpoint Press. In 2019, New York Review Books published I Used to Be Charming, a previously uncollected selection of her essays. In The Paris Review, Molly Lambert wrote, "Babitz is at home anywhere, and everywhere she goes she finds the most interesting person, the weirdest place, the funniest throwaway detail. She makes writing seem effortless and fun, which any writer can tell you is the hardest trick of all." In a 2009 review of Eve's Hollywood, Deborah Shapiro called Babitz's voice "self-assured yet sympathetic, cheeky and voluptuous, but registering just the right amount of irony", adding, "reading West (and Fante and Chandler and Cain and the like) made me want to go to Los Angeles. Babitz makes me feel like I'm there."

The New York Public Library convened a 2016 panel on "The Eve Effect" that included actress Zosia Mamet and New Yorker writer Jia Tolentino. In 2017, Hulu announced it would be developing a comedy series based on Babitz's memoirs, a project led by Liz Tigelaar, Amy Pascal, and Elizabeth Cantillon.

In 2022, the Huntington Library in California announced that it had acquired Babitz's personal archive, which includes drafts, journals, photographs, and letters spanning 1943 to 2011.

== Published works ==
=== Fiction and non-fiction ===
Publisher information relates to first publication only. Some of the books have been reissued.

- Eve's Hollywood (1974) New York, NY: Delacorte Press/S. Lawrence. ISBN 0440023394 OCLC 647012057
- Slow Days, Fast Company: The World, The Flesh, and L.A. (1977) New York, NY: Alfred A. Knopf. ISBN 0394409841 LCCN 76-47922 OCLC 2645787
- Sex and Rage: Advice to Young Ladies Eager for a Good Time (1979) New York, NY: Alfred A. Knopf. ISBN 0394425812 OCLC 1001915515
- L.A. Woman (1982) New York, NY: Linden Press/Simon & Schuster. ISBN 0671420860 OCLC 8110896
- Black Swans: Stories (1993) New York, NY: Alfred A. Knopf/Random House. ISBN 0679405186 OCLC 27067318
- Two by Two: Tango, Two-step, and the L.A. Night (1999). New York, NY: Simon & Schuster. ISBN 0684833921 OCLC 41641459
- I Used to Be Charming: The Rest of Eve Babitz (2019). New York, NY: New York Review of Books ISBN 9781681373799 OCLC 1100441110
- Babitz, Eve (June 23, 2026). Anolik, Lili (ed.). Too L.A.: Letters Never Sent (But Some Were). New York Review of Books. ISBN 978-1-68137-960-9.

=== Non-fiction ===
- Fiorucci, The Book (1980) New York, NY: Harlin Quist/Dial/Delacorte. ISBN 0825226082 OCLC 900307237

=== Selected essays ===
- Roll Over Elvis: The Second Coming of Jim Morrison. Esquire, March 1991

== Personal life ==
Babitz had relationships with Edward Ruscha, Paul Ruscha, Walter Hopps, Jim Morrison, Steve Martin, JD Souther, Stephen Stills, Glenn Frey, Warren Zevon Harrison Ford, Dan Wakefield, Ahmet Ertegun, Annie Leibovitz, and Earl McGrath among others.

"...she’s the L.A. woman in the Doors song..." - Kevin Dettmar

Babitz said "Popsicle Toes" to Michael Franks when they were in bed together and her feet were cold.
