= Mildred Portney Chase =

Mildred Portney Chase (1921–1991) was an international concert pianist, teacher, and the author of the popular books Just Being at the Piano and Improvisation, Music From The Inside Out.

== Early life and career ==
Chase was born in Brooklyn, New York, and moved to Los Angeles at two and a half years old. She had a brother, Joseph, and a sister, Leonora (later Leonora Panich).

Chase began playing the piano by ear at the age of three, and had absolute pitch. She grew up in Boyle Heights, L.A., and studied with Victor Trice, Olga Steeb and Richard Buhlig. She won many piano competitions, and at 13 had her own weekly national radio recital show.

She graduated from Roosevelt High School at 17, then attended the Juilliard School of Music in New York on a fellowship. She studied with Josef Lhévinne, who considered her his best pupil; and with his wife Rosina Lhévinne, when he was on tour. Chase graduated with a diploma, then married William Francis Chase and moved back to L.A.

== Continuing career ==
Chase played regularly on the "Evenings On The Roof" concert series launched by Peter Yeats. She met Meade Lux Lewis, who could not read music, but taught her boogie-woogie. She played jazz piano at Ciro's on Sunset Blvd., Shelly's Man Hole, and other local venues. She taught at USC's Graduate School of Music; and at the Los Angeles Conservatory of Music, where she assisted Rosina Lhevinne.

Chase was active in political causes. In the 1960s, she protested the Board of Education's music defunding of L.A. schools. In the 1970s, she protested the war in Vietnam and gave concerts benefiting the Women's International Strike for Peace (W.I.S.P.).

She presented concerts at the Idyllwild School of Music and the Arts (ISOMATA), now known as the Idyllwild Arts Foundation and played concerts on L.A.' public radio station KPFK. She specialized in baroque music and played harpsichord with Sol Babitz, violinist in the Early Music Laboratory Group. She also performed chamber music extensively with Sascha Jacobsen, Bernie Kundell, Joachim Chassman and other noted players.

On October 31, 1987, Chase received a letter from the revered composer Witold Lutosławski, who wrote:

Warmest thanks . . . for your words about my music. They are of great value for me, indeed. I am reading your book which is fascinating for me as a man who used to be a pianist and not a bad one. Many thanks for your thoughts about pianism apparently simple, and yet so original. Of course, I am anxious to read your new book.

== Books ==
Chase's books Just Being at the Piano and Improvisation: Music From The Inside Out were published in 1974 and 1988, respectively. A revised edition of the former was released in 2017.

== Personal life ==
Chase had two sons, Kenneth and Sanders; and two grandsons, Chris and Mike. She operated a not-for-profit art gallery in Idyllwild, California, where she also gave informal concerts.
