= Super Blood Wolf Moon =

Studio album by Brix & the Extricated
- Released: 25 October 2019
- Recorded: 2019
- Genre: Post-punk
- Label: Grit Over Glamour

Brix & the Extricated chronology
Breaking State (2018)	Super Blood Wolf Moon (2019)

Super Blood Wolf Moon is the third album by the post-punk group Brix & the Extricated, released on 25 October 2019 on Grit Over Glamour records. The album was released on CD and digital formats.

== Critical reception ==
The album received positive reviews, including from Louder Than War, who described it as "blissful classic guitar pop". The website We Are Cult said it was "clearly Brix and the Extricated’s best album, and their darkest, and their deepest...".

== Track listing ==
All songs written by Brix & the Extricated / Brix Smith

1. "Strange Times"
2. "Hustler"
3. "Wolves"
4. "Waterman"
5. "Dinosaur Girl"
6. "Crash Landing"
7. "Wintertyde"
8. "Wasteland"
9. "Tannis Root"
10. "The God Stone"

== Personnel ==
Brix & the Extricated

- Brix Smith Start - vocals
- Steve Hanley - bass guitar
- Paul Hanley - drums
- Steve Trafford - guitar, vocals
- Jason Brown - guitar
