= Ara Guzelimian =

Dean and provost of the Juilliard School

Provost and Dean of the Juilliard School
- Incumbent
- Assumed office August 2006

Personal details
- Born: Cairo, Egypt
- Education: University of California, Los Angeles (BA)

Ara Guzelimian is an American academic and scholar who served as the dean and provost of The Juilliard School from 2006 to 2020. He is the artistic and executive director of the Ojai Music Festival and continues at Juilliard as Special Advisor to the Office of the President.

== Early life and education ==
Born in Cairo, Egypt, Guzelimian graduated earned a degree in music history from the University of California, Los Angeles.

== Career ==
Guzelimian became Dean and Provost of The Juilliard School in 2006. Previously, he worked at Carnegie Hall as artistic advisor and senior director, from 1998 to 2006. During that time he played a key role in the launch of Zankel Hall in 2003 as well as hosting and producing the Making Music composer series there.

He was on the 2000 International Chamber Music Encounter faculty at the Jerusalem Music Centre led by Isaac Stern.

Other music industry positions he has held in the past include artistic administrator of the (Aspen Music Festival and School, Colorado) and national radio broadcast producer and artistic administrator of the (Los Angeles Philharmonic).

His appointment as artistic director of the Ojai Music Festival, beginning with the 75th Festival in June 2021, was announced in October 2019. In June 2020, the Festival announced that he would additionally gain executive director responsibilities.

=== Media ===
Guzelimian has contributed pieces to Helsinki Festival (program book), IRCAM Center Journal, Musical America, The New York Times, Opera News, Opera Quarterly, Record Geijutsu, Salzburg Festival (program book), Symphony Magazine. He has also spoken on the Metropolitan Opera radio and Saint Paul Sunday as a guest host. He edited ‘Parallels and Paradoxes: Explorations in Music and Society.’

=== Recognition ===
In 2003, the French government presented Guzelimian with the ‘Chevalier des Arts et des Lettres’ title. According to Carnegie's executive and artistic director, Clive Gillinson, Guzelimian has “phenomenal expertise, experience and breadth of knowledge and somebody who’s obviously made an enormous contribution to Carnegie hall.”
