= Brix & the Extricated =

British post-punk band

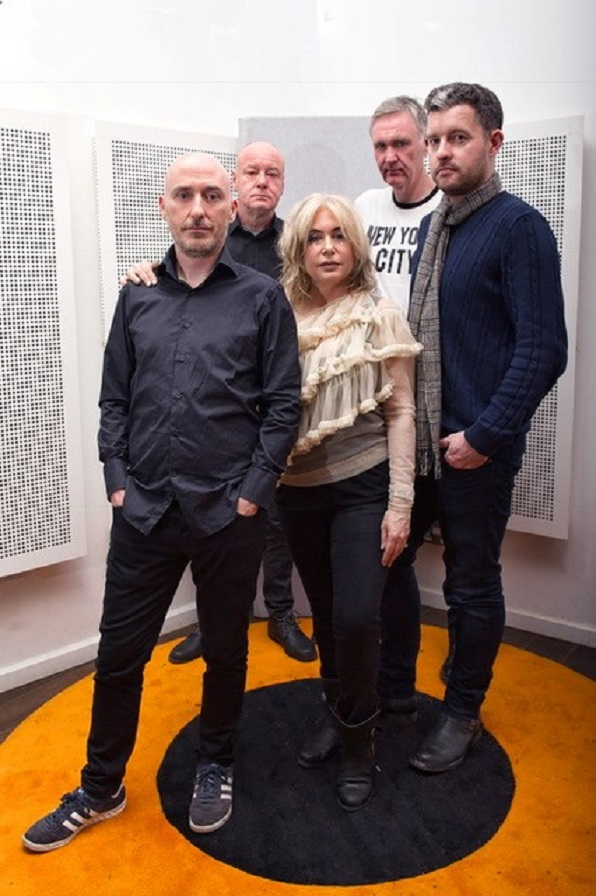
- L-R Jason Brown; Steve Hanley; Brix Smith Start; Paul Hanley; Steve Trafford

Background information
- Origin: Manchester
- Genres: Post-punk
- Years active: 2014–present
- Label: Blang Records
- Members: Brix Smith Start; Steve Hanley; Paul Hanley; Steve Trafford; Jason Brown
- Website: www.facebook.com/extricated/

Brix & the Extricated are a British post-punk band, formed in 2014 in Manchester, by ex-Fall members Brix Smith Start (vocals/guitar) and Steve Hanley (bass guitar).

== History ==
The band formed in 2014 in Manchester, following the launch event for Steve Hanley's autobiography The Big Midweek, to which Brix Smith was invited. Four of the five members were one-time members of The Fall: Songwriter, guitarist and vocalist Brix Smith, long-term Fall member Steve Hanley (bass guitar), his brother Paul Hanley (drums) and Steve Trafford (guitar and vocals). A fifth member, Irish guitarist Jason Brown completes the line-up. Though their live set initially consisted of Fall songs they had co-written, this quickly expanded to include the new material which featured on their debut album.

They performed four live sessions for fellow ex-Fall member Marc Riley's 6 Music show, played the Latitude and Rebellion festivals and completed several successful tours of the UK.

Their debut album, Part 2, was financed by fundraising including charging £1000 to cook a meal, or £7500 to perform at a private function. The album was released in September 2017 on Blang records, which was described as "One of the great indie-rock releases of the year" by Drowned In Sound. Their Autumn 2017 tour concluded with a gig at the Manchester Apollo supporting The Charlatans.

Their second album, Breaking State, was released on 26 October 2018 on the Grit Over Glamour label. Almost exactly a year later, on 25 October 2019, they released their final album, Super Blood Wolf Moon, on the same label. It received positive reviews in the music press, with Louder Than War describing it as "blissful classic guitar pop".

== Discography ==
=== Singles ===
- "Something To Lose"/"Faced With Time"/"US 80s 90s (Live at Hebden Bridge)" (2016, Blang)
- "Damned for Eternity"/"Temporary Insanity" (2017, Blang)
- "Moonrise Kingdom"/"Moonrise Kingdom (Harmonic Convergence)" (2017, Blang)

=== Albums ===
- Part 2 (2017, Blang)
- Breaking State (2018, Grit Over Glamour)
- Super Blood Wolf Moon (2019, Grit Over Glamour)
