= Brix Smith =

American singer and guitarist (born 1962)

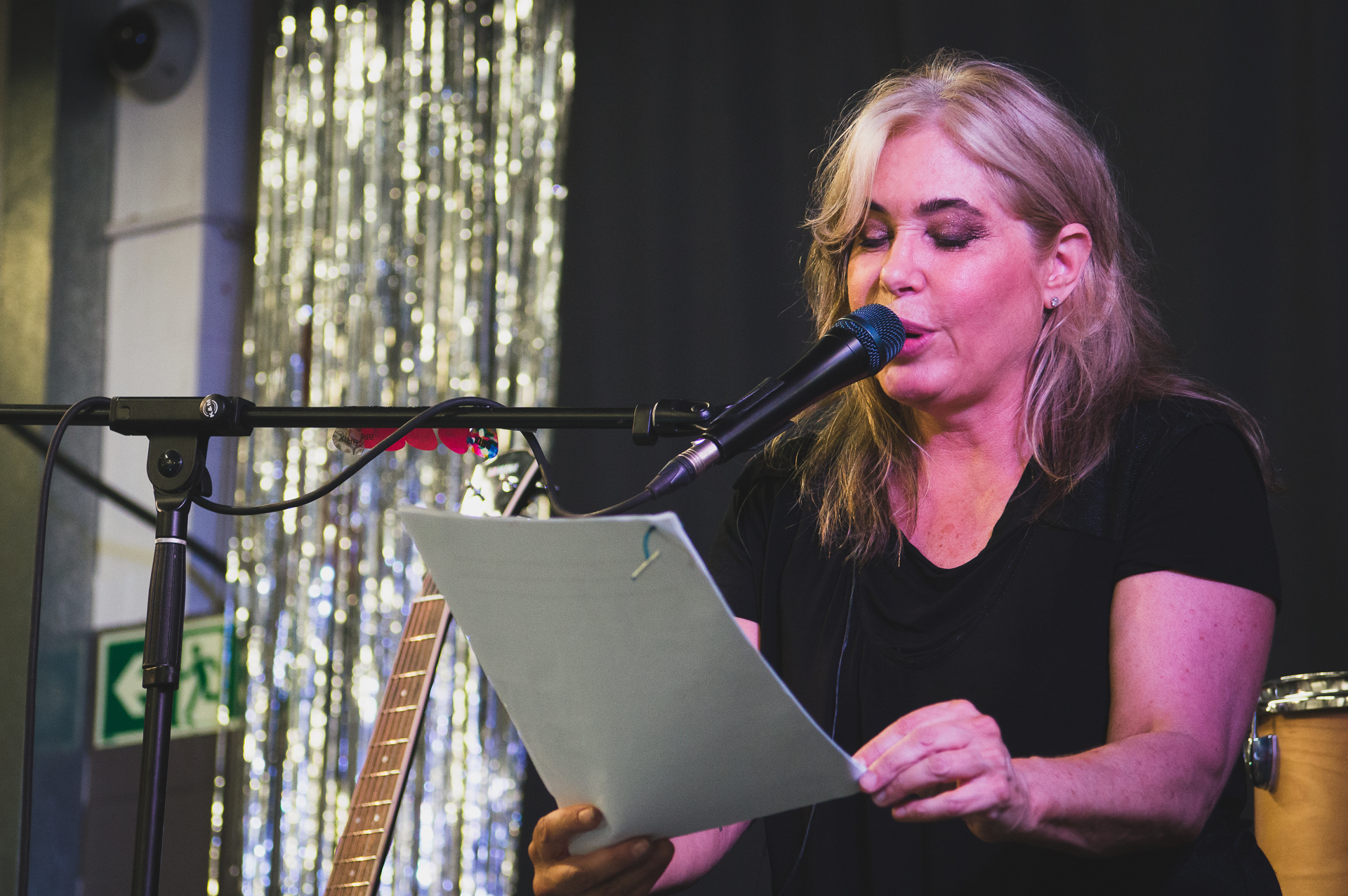
- Smith in 2016

Background information
- Also known as: Brix Smith Start
- Born: Laura Elisse Salenger; November 12, 1962 (age 63)
- Genres: Post-punk
- Occupations: Musician; fashion retailer; presenter
- Instruments: Vocals; guitar
- Years active: 1983–present
- Spouses: Mark E. Smith (m. 1983; div. 1989); Philip Start (m. 2002)

Brix Smith (born Laura Elisse Salenger; November 12, 1962) is an American singer and guitarist, best known as the lead guitarist and a major songwriter for the English post-punk band the Fall during two stints in the band (1983–1989, and 1994–1996).

Acknowledging her importance to the band, and noting she co-wrote several songs for the band's most widely acclaimed album This Nation's Saving Grace (1985), some critics break the Fall's career and evolution into the pre-Brix years, the Brix years, and the post-Brix years.

She is currently the lead vocalist and guitarist with Brix & the Extricated, along with brothers Steve and Paul Hanley, both of whom were long time musicians in the Fall. She published her memoir The Rise, the Fall, and the Rise with Faber & Faber in May 2016, noting that "writing the book freed my creativity to play again."

== Biography ==
Smith was raised in Los Angeles by her mother Lucy Salenger, a TV executive at CBS. Mother and daughter moved to Chicago in 1972, when Salenger married political economist Marvin Zonis and became a powerful regional figure in the film business as head of the Illinois Film Office.

She studied theatre and literature at Bennington College in Vermont, where notable classmates included authors Bret Easton Ellis, Donna Tartt, and Jonathan Lethem. She has been interviewed about her time at the notoriously unstructured, drug-rife, and wealthy private college in several episodes of a podcast series titled Once Upon a Time... At Bennington College which was created by Lili Anolik.

Smith formed a group, Banda Dratsing, in which she performed as bassist/vocalist; she adopted the name "Brix" after the Clash's 1979 song "The Guns of Brixton".

=== The Fall ===
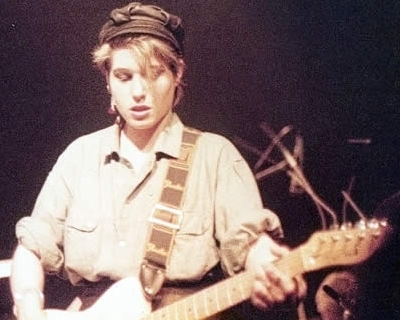
Smith onstage with the Fall at the Markthalle Hamburg, Perverted by Language Tour, April 13, 1984

Smith met Mark E. Smith, vocalist of the Fall, at a gig at the Metro in Chicago on 23 April 1983; she moved to his native United Kingdom, where they settled in Prestwich, Bury, England, and married on 19 July of that year. She initially played with the group on two songs for the album Perverted by Language. She co-wrote some of the best-regarded Fall tracks from the period, and is acknowledged for introducing a more mainstream, pop-oriented element to the group's sound. She remained with the Fall until her divorce from Smith in 1989. She rejoined for the live promotion of the album Middle Class Revolt (1994) and remained for the recording and promotion of albums Cerebral Caustic (1995) and The Light User Syndrome (1996).

=== The Adult Net ===
In 1985, Smith launched side project the Adult Net with fellow Fall member Simon Rogers. Contributors included Mark E. Smith, Karl Burns and Craig Scanlon, all then-current members of the Fall. The group released four singles for the Fall's label Beggars Banquet Records in 1985 and 1986, including a cover of Strawberry Alarm Clock's "Incense and Peppermints".

The Adult Net released their sole album The Honey Tangle in 1989 on Phonogram Records. By 1989, the substantially revised line-up of the group consisted of Brix Smith, former Smiths guitarist Craig Gannon, the The bassist James Eller and Blondie drummer Clem Burke.

=== Brix & the Extricated ===
Smith reunited with former Fall bassist Steve Hanley and drummer Paul Hanley as Brix & the Extricated for a one-off gig at the Manchester Ruby Lounge in December 2014. They played Fall songs to celebrate the launch of Steve Hanley’s book The Big Midweek: Life Inside the Fall. The success of the concert saw the band start performing more gigs and, in 2015, a national UK tour. They played the Rebellion Festival in August 2016, where Brix was interviewed by John Robb. The line-up is completed by guitarists Steve Trafford (another ex-Fall member) and Jason Brown.

By this time new material was being written and introduced into the set. A single, "Something to Lose", was released on Blang Records in November 2016, followed by the album Part 2 in September 2017. Their second album, Breaking State, was released in October 2018 on Grit Over Glamour Records and almost exactly a year later in October 2019, their third album, Super Blood Wolf Moon, came out on the same label.

=== Solo work and other activities ===
After leaving the Fall and disbanding the Adult Net, Smith went on to tour with the Bangles. She became romantically involved with violinist Nigel Kennedy, and they collaborated on a cover of Donovan's "Hurdy Gurdy Man" for the 1992 Donovan tribute album Island of Circles; the song was released as a single in 1993 on Nettwerk.

In 1994, Smith auditioned for Hole after the death of bassist Kristen Pfaff, but was in the group for one day. Hole guitarist Eric Erlandson, while supportive of Melissa Auf der Maur as Pfaff's replacement, later commented that he was a huge fan of Brix and expressed regret that he didn't get a chance to play with her in the group. In 1997, she released the Happy Unbirthday EP on Strangelove. The EP is a collaboration with Marty Willson-Piper and includes a cover of David Bowie's "Space Oddity". A decade later, in 2007, she released her debut solo LP Neurotica, as a digital download on Loser Friendly Records.

In 2022, Smith announced a new album, Valley of the Dolls, co-written with Youth from Killing Joke, and a new live band to perform this material, containing Debbie Googe and Jen Macro of My Bloody Valentine, as well as Vas Antoniadou and Ros Cairney from deux furieuses. The album contains guest contributions from Susanna Hoffs of the Bangles and Siobhan Fahey and is planned for release in 2023 on Republic of Music. The band has supported Killing Joke, and went on tour with Public Image Ltd in June 2022.

=== Work in fashion ===
Smith married fashion entrepreneur Philip Start. In 2002, the couple opened the boutique "Start" in east London. The business expanded to four boutiques and an online store. The Shoreditch boutique closed in May 2015. In recent years, Smith has appeared as a fashion expert on British television shows, including Channel 4's Gok's Fashion Fix. She also appeared on Animal Planet UK's Top Dog, The Culture Show on BBC Two, John Peel's Record Box, LK Today's "What's Hot and What's Not" segment and Sky 1's Angela and Friends. She appeared as a fashion expert on Sky television's coverage of the 2011 Academy Awards in February 2011, and she took part in the fashion commentary in Channel 4's coverage of Royal Ascot in June 2013. That summer she presented the first series of Ultimate Shopper, broadcast in the UK by digital channel TLC.

== Sources ==
- Edge, Brian. Paintwork: Portrait of the Fall. London: Omnibus Press, 1989. ISBN 978-0-7119-1740-8
- Ford, Simon. Hip Priest: The Story of Mark E.Smith and the Fall. London: Quartet Books, 2002. ISBN 978-0-7043-8167-4
- Hanley, Steve. The Big Midweek: Life Inside the Fall. London: Route, 2014. ISBN 978-1-9019-2758-0
- Irvin, Jim (ed). The Mojo Collection: 4th Edition. London: Canongate Books, 2017. ISBN 978-1-8419-5973-3
- Norton, Tessa; Stanley, Bob. Excavate!: The Wonderful and Frightening World of the Fall . London: Faber & Faber, 2021. ISBN 978-0-5713-5833-5
- Smith, Brix. The Rise, the Fall, and the Rise. London: Faber & Faber, 2017. ISBN 978-0-5713-2506-1
