= This Nation's Saving Grace =

1985 studio album by the Fall

Studio album by The Fall
- Released: 23 September 1985
- Recorded: June–July 1985
- Studios: The Music Works, London The Workhouse, Old Kent Road, London
- Genre: Post-punk
- Length: 47:17
- Label: Beggars Banquet
- Producer: John Leckie

The Fall chronology
The Wonderful and Frightening World Of... (1984)	This Nation's Saving Grace (1985)	Bend Sinister (1986)

This Nation's Saving Grace is the eighth studio album by the English post-punk band the Fall, released in 1985 by Beggars Banquet.

In contrast to the band's earlier more abrasive albums, Saving Grace is noted for its pop sensibilities and guitar hooks, and John Leckie's accessible production. Saving Grace was recorded in London between June and July 1985, and is the second of the three consecutive Fall albums produced by Leckie. The album was accompanied by the singles "Couldn't Get Ahead" and "Cruiser's Creek", and tours of Europe and America.

Guitarist Brix Smith and bassist Steve Hanley consider Saving Grace to be one of the band's best albums, an opinion widely shared by critics. According to The Guardian, it shows the band "operating just on the edge of the mainstream and at the peak of their accessibility and yet strangeness". In 2002, Pitchfork placed it as the 13th best album of the 1980s.

== Background and line-up ==
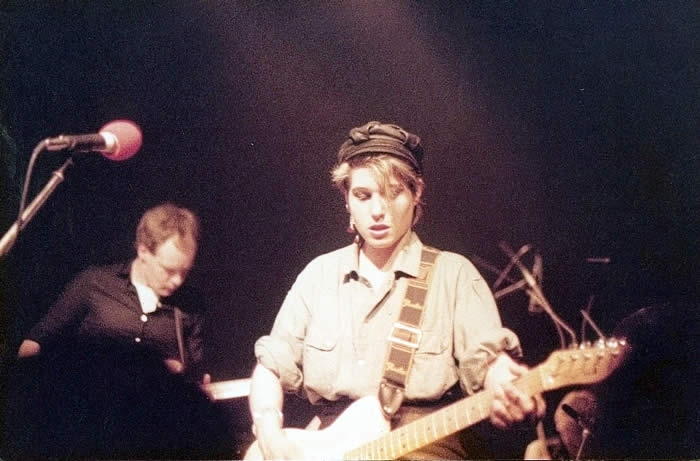
Steve Hanley and Brix Smith performing live, 1984

The Fall's line-up had been stable for a number of years until November 1984, when, during a promotional tour for their preceding album "The Wonderful and Frightening World of...", long-time members, brothers Paul Hanley (drums) and Steve Hanley (bass) both quit. Their departures were triggered by an incident on the first of that month when the band's equipment was stolen from a van left parked after a gig in Cardiff's New Ocean Hotel. Although replacement equipment was arranged, Smith blamed the musicians for the loss. The following night, while hitting their tour-bus headrests with a stick, they shouted: "Who the fuck would be stupid enough to leave a fucking van outside a hotel with all the fucking gear in it." After this, both brothers decided to leave the band. Paul Hanley's departure became permanent, leaving Karl Burns the band's sole drummer, while Steve Hanley was eventually persuaded by Smith to come back after taking paternity leave for several months. According to Brix, the bassist's exit left Smith "chastened...for probably the only time I have ever seen".

Hanley was replaced as bassist by Simon Rogers, a classically-trained musician whom Smith knew from an earlier collaboration with the dancer-choreographer Michael Clark. The self-taught Hanley has since admitted to being disillusioned when replaced by a musician of Rogers’ caliber and wide accomplishments. After Hanley's return in the midst of recording sessions for the new album, Rogers remained in the band but switched to guitar and keyboards. Smith marked Hanley's rejoining the band with the words "S Hanley! He's Back" etched into the run-out groove on Side 1.

The Fall recorded their eighth Peel session on 14 May 1985. The recordings contain early versions of three songs from Saving Grace ("Couldn't Get Ahead", "Spoilt Victorian Child" and "Gut of the Quantifier") as well as a version of "Cruiser's Creek". Their ninth Peel session, recorded on 29 September, includes recordings of "L.A." and "What You Need" that writer Steve Pringle describes as "brighter and sharper" than the album versions.

== Recording ==
The album was recorded between June and July 1985 at the London studios the Music Works and the Workhouse on Old Kent Road. John Leckie had produced the band's 1984 album The Wonderful and Frightening World Of... and had built a strong working relationship with Smith. Leckie's approach to the project was to both retain the Fall's rough edges and solid rhythm section, while emphasising Brix's more pop-oriented guitar parts. His production created a heavier wall of sound than their earlier releases, and Smith praised his ability to bring forward the drum and bass parts. Smith later said that what he and Leckie were trying to achieve was a "well-produced bedroom sound".

== Music and lyrics ==
Steve Hanley had often been the group's main riff writer on earlier albums, but due to his absence in the lead up to the album, Brix and rhythm guitarist Craig Scanlon wrote most of the song's foundation riffs. Hanley later said that on earlier recordings the whole group had contributed music, but for This Nation's most of the work was done by Brix and Scanlon, in a 60/40 ratio by his estimation. As Brix had begun her career as a bass player, most of her musical ideas were simple one-string riffs played lead guitar but closely resembling bass lines. Although she had been in awe of his playing when she had joined the band in 1983, her attitude towards him was different on his return, when she told Hanley "I'll show you the bass line on my guitar and you Steve Hanley it up."

Smith's lyrics are typically caustic throughout; the music critic John Mulvey wrote that at times the "vile is positively phantasmagoric".

=== Side one ===
The album opens with "Mansion", one of the Fall's few instrumentals, which the band often opened their live sets with. It is built around a guitar riff from Brix that evokes early horror and sci-fi film music and is clearly influenced by The Deviants' 1969 song "Billy the Monster". The following track "Bombast" is dominated by Hanley's bass. Smith's vocals promise to "bring wrath" to "bastard idiots" (including Lloyd Cole, whom Smith described in the September Peel session version of "Crusier's Creek" as having a "brain and face...made out of cowpat. We all know that)", and are at times sung through a megaphone.

"What You Need" is built around Scanlon's circular guitar riff. The line "slippery shoes for your horrible feet" and song title are taken from an episode of The Twilight Zone. "Spoilt Victorian Child" incorporates unused lyrics intended for the Fall's 1979 debut album Live at the Witch Trials, but had been held back until the band found suitable "daft English music". The jerky and stuttering guitar riff written by Rogers is in 6/4 time, a signature Brix initially found difficult to master. Smith's lyrics contain a number of Victorian era reference points, including pop-up books, aqueducts, poxes and the Cottingley Fairies.

The 1985 cassette version contains the bonus track "Vixen", a melodic surf music song written and sung by Brix, which Pringle describes as "rather slight" but which was well regarded by fans. It was never played live.

Side one ends with Brix's "L.A.", written while the Smiths spent an extended stay in the city. Mark had a poor impression of the city and said that he "Hated it...Horrible town. If you like a beer, you are regarded as a tramp." The track was described in 2011 as an "electro-goth groove" by critic Martin Aston. It contains prominent keyboards by Simon Rogers. While the lead vocals are sung by Brix, Smith added backings which he said reflect his impression of the city as "more haunted than any old place". Dave Haslam ranked it as "the sexiest song of 1985" in City Life, an assessment Smith disagreed with yet claimed to understand; he credited its sex appeal to Brix's contribution and noted how the song was popular among women—"Except," he clarified, "that the Fall are probably the most unpopular group among women ever. We've never had a good review from a woman journalist in the whole world."

=== Side two ===
Side two opens with "Gut of the Quantifier", the central bassline of which is reminiscent of the Doors's The Changeling. "My New House" details the Smiths' purchase of a semi-detached in Sedgley Park, Prestwich, close to Mark's childhood home where his parents still lived. A number of visitors remarked how unusual the house was, in particular the blue/grey colour scheme used in each room. Although credited to Mark Smith alone, the track originated from a riff by guitarist Scanlon. The lyrics are humorous and sardonic with lines such as "no rabbit hutch about it, I bought it off the Baptists, I get the bills, and I get miffed". Although a fan favourite, and described by the Daily News' David Hinkley as "near-hypnotic", it was dropped from their live set after 1986.

"Paint Work" is often described as the album's high point. It features a semi-acoustic tape collage, stream of consciousness lyrics, Karl Burns' cymbal crashes and "meandering" lead guitar line provided by Scanlon. Credited to Smith, Scanlon and Rogers, it blends studio recordings with sections recorded on a four track in Rogers' flat and audio from Smith's dictaphone. During the mixing, Smith took the master tape home and accidentally erased part of the track with a section from an Open University documentary lecture on "red giants stars". The sudden jump between lo-fi home taped and studio recordings fitted the mood of the track, and he and Leckie decided to include on the finished version. The lyrics are mostly a series of "enigmatic" and often disconnected lines and phrases, with the central hook "Hey Mark! You're spoiling all the paintwork" based on a complaint made by a decorator just after the Smiths had moved into the "new house" detailed in the preceding track. The track was described in 2019 as "absolutely sublime" by Vulture, as "mildly psychedelic" in 2011 by critic Mick Middles, and as "a thing of true wonder" by writer Steve Pringle in 2022.

The drum heavy "I Am Damo Suzuki" is a tribute to the Japanese expat vocalist Damo Suzuki of the Krautrock group Can, who Smith has often described as an early and major influence. The lyrics describe and evoke Suzuki's stage presence and singing style and are accompanied by Brix's descending chords and Burns' metronomic drums. The music is heavily influenced by the 1971 Can song "Oh Yeah", but also contains elements of other Can tracks such as "Bel Air" (1973), "Gomorrah" (1974) and "Midnight Men" (1977). This is evident especially in the descending chords, which are similar to the earlier Fall track "Elves" (also written by Brix, and based on the Stooges "I Wanna Be Your Dog". "I Am Damo Suzuki" was described in 2022 as a "hypnotic art-rock anthem befitting of [Can's] name", while in 2019 Suzuki biographer Paul Woods wrote that "MES took the 'Oh Yeah' riff and overrode it with a speed-freak surrealist tribute to Can and Damo himself while throwing in an oblique reference to Fritz Leiber, one of a number of supernatural horror authors who also obsessed him."

The word "Yarbles" in the title of "To NK Roachment: Yarbles" is borrowed from the novel A Clockwork Orange as Nadsat for testicles. The track is a reprise of "Mansion", but according to Pringle, it has a "softer and gentler tone." Both the vocal melody and lyrics "Every day you have to die some / Every day you have to cry some / All the good times are past and gone" are based on the 1963 Arthur Alexander song "Every Day I Have To Cry".

=== 1988 bonus tracks ===
Four bonus tracks were included on the 1988, 1990 and 1997 CD releases. The music for the album's second single "Cruiser's Creek" is built around another circular and twangy guitar riff by Brix, while the lyrics detail a debauched office-party. Writing for The Guardian in 2014, critic Dave Simpson described the song as "leftfield and outsiderly, yet the insistent tune is surely as catchy as anything by the Beatles." For Hinkley, the song is reminiscent of Dire Straits. It was released on 11 October 1985, and was accompanied by a music video directed by both Mark and Cerith Wyn Evans, and stars Leigh Bowery in a role Smith described as resembling "a clerk on acid, like he was from some alternative world".

The other two bonus tracks are a cover of Gene Vincent's rockabilly song "Rollin' Dany", and the original "Couldn't Get Ahead", which was recorded before Steve Hanley rejoined and has Rogers playing bass.

== Release ==
This Nation's Saving Grace was released on 23 September 1985 by Beggars Banquet Records. The label took out full-page adverts in the UK Music press, showing the album's bleak city-scape of Manchester's centre drawn by Michael Pollard with a horse-pulled chariot in the clouds above the city buildings drawn by Claus Castenskiold. A full-page advert in Melody Maker shows the album cover and includes details of their October and November 1985 UK tour, and a mention of the cassette version of the album that featured bonus tracks. This Nation's Saving Grace reached number 54 on the UK Albums Chart. After tours of the north of England and the US, the Fall recorded the double A-sided single "Couldn't Get Ahead"/"Rollin' Dany" and subsequent single "Cruiser's Creek" with Rogers standing in on bass guitar.

== Reception ==
Professional ratings
Contemporaneous reviews (1985–86)
Review scores
Source	Rating
Calgary Herald	A
Daily News	2.5/4 stars
Music Week	3/3 stars
The Sault Star	3/5 stars
Sounds	4.5/5 stars
Times Colonist	2/4 stars
The Village Voice	B+

This Nation's Saving Grace was highly praised by the UK music press on release. The NME's David Quantick wrote the Fall had managed to create "one of their most accessible LPs yet" which was yet "infinitely more peculiar than almost anything else released this year." In a very positive review for Sounds, Chris Roberts wrote "Oh, to be thirteen again and have this be the first record one heard". In contrast to the prevailing view of the Fall's development after recruiting Brix, Music Week suggested the album offered more of the same but lacked potential for mainstream crossover.

Critics generally praised Brix's direction and songwriting. Robert Christgau of The Village Voice noted how the "Yank guitarist...righted husband Mark E.'s feckless avant-gardishness" and said that the record was "cunningly sloppy, minimally catchy Hawkwind/Stooges with each three-chord drone long enough to make an avant-gardish statement but stopping short of actual boredom." In a 1986 article on the band in Creem, Renaldo Migaldi said "The Fall have been around since 1977, but only in the last couple of years have they achieved their fullest creative flowering" on This Nation's Saving Grace and their preceding album, noting that her contributions had been "integral to how the band sounds now. Namely, better." Conversely, a blurb on the album in Cashbox was dismissive: "This is post wave rock 'n' roll for the depressed teenager."

NME ranked "TNSG" as the sixth best album of 1985. Listeners of John Peel's BBC Radio 1 show voted six songs from This Nation's Saving Grace to the annual Festive Fifty list: "Cruiser's Creek" (no. 3), "Spoilt Victorian Child" (no. 23), "Gut of the Quantifier" (no. 33), "Couldn't Get Ahead" (no. 39), "L.A." (no. 42), and "Rollin' Dany" (no. 55). Jim Sullivan of The Boston Globe and Kristine McKenna of the Los Angeles Times also ranked the album in their top ten best albums of the year.

=== Retrospective evaluation ===
Professional ratings
Retrospective reviews
Review scores
Source	Rating
AllMusic	4.5/5 stars
The Guardian	5/5 stars
Mojo	5/5 stars
Pitchfork	10/10
Q	4/5 stars
The Rolling Stone Album Guide	(1992) (2001)
Spin Alternative Record Guide	10/10
Uncut	9/10

Bruce Tiffee of Pitchfork described the album as "one of the strongest" Fall releases and "perhaps the best record to emerge from the Beggars Banquet Fall era". In 2011 Dave Simpson of The Guardian wrote that the album showcased the Fall "thrillingly subverting the notion of what pop music is", while John Mulvey of Uncut wrote that it contained the band's strongest configuration "in all their menacing and utilitarian finery".

In 2002, This Nation's... was listed by Pitchfork as the 13th best album of the 1980s, while it appeared at number 46 on Spin's list of the 100 greatest albums from 1985 to 2005, and as number 93 on Slant Magazine's 2012 list of the best albums of the 1980s. NME placed the album as number 400 on their 2013 list of the 500 greatest albums of all time.

The record was ranked number 441 in the third edition of writer Colin Larkin's All Time Top 1000 Albums (2000), a list based on a poll of more than 200,000 people. According to Larkin's The Encyclopedia of Popular Music, Brix's "partly melodious sheen ... brought an air of 60s subculture to the group's post-industrial rattle", without compromising the band's "stubbornly maverick" roots, as the album "shows the Fall extending stylistic barriers without sacrificing their individuality."

In his 2022 book "You Must Get Them All: The Fall on Record", Steve Pringle describes the album as the "perfect marriage of The Fall's increasing accessibility and their more challenging qualities". According to Pringle "it contains a flawless balance of everything the group did exceptionally well: aural barrage and grinding repetition, off-kilter pop-hooks, sonic experimentation and audacious weirdness."

== Legacy ==
James Murphy—best known as the frontman of New York dance-punk band LCD Soundsystem—purchased This Nation's Saving Grace the year of its release and said its aesthetic initially "terrified" him. He later said it was a formative influence:

I was completely blown away. At the time, all I could hear on the radio was synth pop and then here comes this band that sound broken and wrong. I'd never heard anything like it—the idea of someone taking the time to go into a studio and record a singer [who] may or may not be in tune. It opened a lot of abstract paths to me because before that I was looking at abstract art and saying, 'This is garbage! What's the point?' But I started to get into abstract art because of the Fall ... I started to realise that people's aesthetic goals were not necessarily to achieve perfection.

Murphy said the album inspired him to take greater risks in his music and, more specifically, noted its impact on the lo-fi intro to "Yr City's a Sucker" from LCD Soundsystem's 2005 self-titled debut album, akin to the tape experimentation of "Paint Work". On the band's 2017 album American Dream, the song "Other Voices" alludes to "L.A." with the line, "This is what's happening and it's freaking you out".

== Reissue ==
An extended version of the album was issued in 2011 on the Beggars Banquet reissue imprint "Beggars Archive". The 42-track box-set was accompanied by a 48-page colour booklet and two discs of rough studio mixes and Peel sessions.

== Track listings ==
=== Original UK LP ===
Side A
No.	Title	Writer(s)	Length
1.	"Mansion"	Brix Smith	1:21
2.	"Bombast"	Steve Hanley, Mark E. Smith	3:08
3.	"Barmy (Note: The original US LP follows the UK LP track listing, but swaps "Barmy" for "Cruisers Creek")"	M. Smith	5:21
4.	"What You Need"	Craig Scanlon, M. Smith	4:50
5.	"Spoilt Victorian Child"	Simon Rogers, M. Smith	4:13
6.	"L.A."	B. Smith, M. Smith	4:10

Side B
No.	Title	Writer(s)	Length
7.	"Gut of the Quantifier"	Karl Burns, Rogers, B. Smith, M. Smith	5:16
8.	"My New House"	M. Smith	5:16
9.	"Paint Work"	Rogers, Scanlon, M. Smith	6:38
10.	"I Am Damo Suzuki"	Burns, B. Smith, M. Smith	5:41
11.	"To Nkroachment: Yarbles"	B. Smith, M. Smith	1:23
Total length:			47:17

=== Cassette and CD ===
1985 cassette
No.	Title	Writer(s)	Length
1.	"Mansion"	B. Smith	1:21
2.	"Bombast"	Hanley, M. Smith	3:07
3.	"Barmy"	M. Smith	5:20
4.	"What You Need"	Scanlon, M. Smith	4:49
5.	"Spoilt Victorian Child"	Rogers, M. Smith	4:12
6.	"L.A."	B. Smith, M. Smith	4:09
7.	"Vixen"	B. Smith, M. Smith	4:01
8.	"Couldn't Get Ahead"	B. Smith, M. Smith	2:35
9.	"Gut of the Quantifier"	Burns, Rogers, B. Smith, M. Smith	5:15
10.	"My New House"	M. Smith	5:16
11.	"Paint Work"	Rogers, Scanlon, M. Smith	6:38
12.	"I Am Damo Suzuki"	Burns, B. Smith, M. Smith	5:40
13.	"To Nkroachment: Yarbles"	B. Smith, M. Smith	1:23
14.	"Petty (Thief) Lout"	Scanlon, M. Smith	5:20
Total length:			59:06

1988, 1990 and 1997 CD bonus tracks
No.	Title	Writer(s)	Length
15.	"Rollin' Dany" (single A-side)	Joe Steen, Paul Edwards	2:23
16.	"Cruisers Creek" (edit) (single A-side)	B. Smith, M. Smith	4:16
Total length:			65:56

== Personnel ==
The Fall

- Mark E. Smith – vocals, violin on "I Am Damo Suzuki", guitar; harmonica on "Couldn't Get Ahead"
- Brix Smith – guitar, vocals
- Steve Hanley – bass guitar, backing vocals
- Craig Scanlon – guitar, backing vocals
- Karl Burns – drums, backing vocals
- Simon Rogers – keyboards, guitar, bass guitar, drum machine, backing vocals

Technical

- John Leckie – production, engineering
- Joe Gillingham – engineering
- Michael Pollard – cover
- Claus Castenskiold – cover
