= Sol Babitz =

American musicologist and violinist (1911–1982)

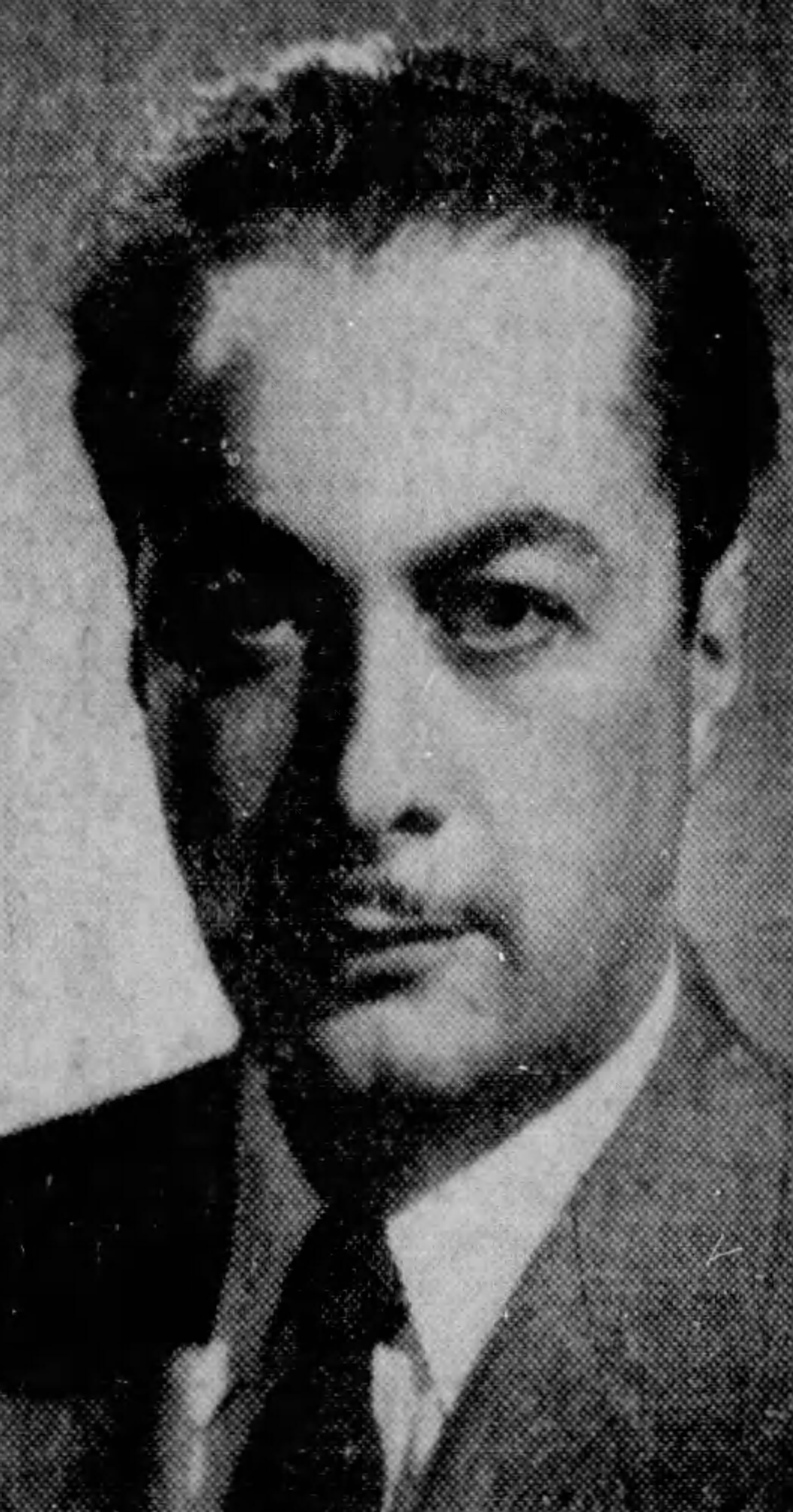
Babitz c. 1955

Sol Babitz (October 11, 1911 – February 18, 1982) was an American violinist, musicologist, teacher, editor, and writer. A pioneer of historically informed performance, Babitz specialized in researching 17th- and 18th-century Western music practices and was the co-founder of the Early Music Laboratory in Los Angeles. A controversial figure in mid-20th-century music circles, his radical ideas challenging established approaches to Baroque and Classical period music literature; his arrogant and flamboyant personality received mixed and sometimes heated reactions from his contemporaries. Despite his place as a controversial personality, eventually the majority of Babitz's ideas and research into pre-1850 performance practices were accepted as accurate. He was the author of several books and academic papers on historically informed performance, and a longtime editor of the American Federation of Musicians's journal International Musician (1941–1962).

A native of Brooklyn, Babitz was a self-taught musician in his youth who managed to win a gold medal at a music competition held at Carnegie Hall in 1927 while in high school. He completed his high school education in Los Angeles where he began his formal music training with Alexander Roman and gave his first concerts and recitals in the early 1930s. In 1932–1933 he studied at the Berlin University of the Arts and in Paris before returning to Los Angeles to play in the first violin section of the Los Angeles Philharmonic in the 1930s. After this he played in studio orchestras for Hollywood films for over two decades. He also served as concertmaster of the Ojai Music Festival from its founding in 1947 and through the 1950s, and was a regular performer in the Evenings on the Roof concert series from 1940 to 1960. In the 1940s he worked closely with Igor Stravinsky as a music editor and arranger, and was one of the composer's closest friends. Stravinsky was the godfather of his daughter, the writer Eve Babitz. His second wife, Eve's mother, was the artist Mae Babitz. Their other daughter was the designer Mirandi Babitz.

== Early life and career ==
The son of Abraham and Lillian Babitz (1889-1988), Sol Babitz was born in Brooklyn, New York on October 11, 1911. His parents were both of Russian-Jewish descent, and met in Toronto, Canada, in 1907. His mother had survived a pogrom targeting Jews when she was a little girl, and had relocated to Canada after the Russian Revolution of 1905. His father was a labor organizer for the International Ladies Garment Workers Union. Sol's sister, the professional dancer Thelma Babitz, was a member of the Martha Graham Dance Company.

Sol was educated in New York City Public Schools. At the age of 15 he won the gold medal in the 1927 New York York Music Week Association contest which was held at Carnegie Hall. At this point in time he was largely a self-taught musician. At the age of 16 he relocated with his parents and two sisters to Los Angeles, where his father worked as the editor of the California Jewish Voice. He completed his high school education at Theodore Roosevelt High School in 1929. He studied violin with Alexander Roman of the Los Angeles Philharmonic. Roman was credited as his sole teacher at the time of his 1932 recital debut.

In 1930–1931 Babitz was a soloist in concerts with the Santa Monica Bay Music Association, Pryor Moore's orchestra on KFI radio, KECA radio, and on KABC (AM) radio. In March 1931 he performed as a soloist in a benefit concert given at L.A.'s Labor Temple. Later that year he performed as a soloist with the Glendale Symphony Orchestra. In February 1932 he gave private recitals at the home of his aunt, the film actress Vera Gordon, and at The Biltmore Los Angeles. He also performed at a dinner honoring Albert Einstein and his wife Elsa under the auspices of the Jewish National Fund. The following month he gave his first public recital at the Council House Auditorium in Los Angeles with the pianist turned actor Max Rabinowitz as his accompanist.

== Education in Europe and violinist in Los Angeles ==
In 1932 Babitz left the United States to pursue studies in music at the Berlin University of the Arts where he was a pupil of Carl Flesch (violin), Curt Sachs (musicology), and Paul Juon (composition). In 1933 he went to Paris to pursue further studies in violin with Marcel Chailley. After completing his studies he returned to Los Angeles where he joined the violin section of the Los Angeles Philharmonic (LAP), performing with the group from 1933 to 1937 during the tenure of music director Otto Klemperer. In 1934 he was a soloist in a concert honoring composer Joseph Achron given at the Sinai Temple in Los Angeles. In 1938 he gave a recital at the Belasco Theater under the auspices of the Federal Music Project.

In 1937 Babitz left his position with the LAP to become a resident violinist in the studio orchestra of Twentieth Century Fox. He continued to work as a violinist in Hollywood film orchestras through at least 1959, and possibly as late as 1961. He occasionally broke away from his studio work to perform with Stuff Smith and Nat King Cole at a bar at Sunset and Vine across from NBC Studios in the 1940s and 1950s.

Babitz concurrently worked as the first concertmaster of the Ojai Music Festival (OMF) in the late 1940s and 1950s. The festival was founded in 1947, and during the initial years of the organization Babitz managed the personnel of the festival's orchestra and was responsible for contracting performers. At the 1948 OMF he performed Stravinsky's l'Histoire du Soldat under the baton of Edward Rebner. In addition to playing in the OMF orchestra, he led a string quartet in residence at the OMF, the Babitz Quartet, whose other member included cellist Joseph Coppin, violist Myron Sadler, and violinist Samuel Fordis.

While playing with Twentieth Century Fox Babitz was part of a group of studio musicians known as the Experimental Orchestra that would play readings of new scores for composers and conductors and thereby assisted them in the creative process. Through his work in this group, he formed a friendship with Igor Stravinsky in 1940. Babitz became Stravinsky's close collaborator during the 1940s, assisting the composer in the notation of his string parts and in a publication on a treatise on the modernization of fingering technique to enable players to perform the music being written by modern composers. Babitz developed a system of "backhanded fingering" which he shared with composer Arnold Schoenberg to demonstrate to the composer how a player could better handle some of notoriously difficult passages in his Violin Concerto.

In 1940 Babitz began an association with Evenings on the Roof (EOR), a Los Angeles concert series founded in 1939 by the poet Peter Yates. The EOR concerts were held on the top floor of Yates' home which was designed by Rudolf Shindler. Babitz was asked to replace the concert violinist Orline Burrow who departed Los Angeles due to her marriage for several engagements in the 1940–1941 season. These included performances of Beethoven's Violin Sonata No. 6, Violin Sonata No. 7, and Violin Sonata No. 8, and in concerts of several violin sonatas by Charles Ives performed with pianist Ingolf Dahl. He remained a regular performer in EOC concerts into the 1950s. In 1954 he appeared at the EOR (by then renamed Monday Evening Concerts) as a performer in the world premiere of Stravinsky's In Memoriam Dylan Thomas which was composed to honor the Welsh poet of that name who had died in 1953. He was still playing in the Monday Evening Concerts as late as 1960 when he performed in the West Coast premiere of Stravinsky's Double Canon that was composed in honor of Raoul Dufy.

With Dahl, Babitz co-edited Ives's Violin Sonata No. 3 for publication in the journal New Music Quarterly at the behest of its editor Nicolas Slonimsky. Babitz later performed this sonata with André Previn at the EOR in 1949. It is through both his and Dahl's advocacy that Stravinsky's music became a frequently performed repertoire at the EOC concerts. Babitz and Dahl performed the Stravinsky Violin Concerto at the EOC's January 1943 concert, and the following March the pair performed Stravinsky's Circus Polka using an arrangement created by Babitz. Babitz also had a hand in editing a newly published score of Stravinsky's Violin Concerto, as the original publication had many errors in fingering and bowing which infuriated the composer.

While principally a violinist, Babitz would occasionally perform on other string instruments such as the mandolin, viola, and the viola d'amore. In 1965 he played the mandolin in the world premiere of Pierre Boulez's Éclat.

== Scholar, writer, and the Early Music Laboratory ==
=== Overview ===
As a scholar and writer, Babitz served as the editor of the American Federation of Musicians's journal International Musician from 1941 through 1962, and was also editor of the UK-based journal The Strad in the early 1960s. He had previously developed a new form of dance notation, "Dance Writing", which was published in 1939. He also wrote two books on violin technique and performance: Principles of Extensions in Violin Fingering (1947) and The Violin: Views and Reviews (1959). He had an impact on the early music revival of the 20th century through his work as a scholar of historically informed performance (HIP). Several of the articles he wrote for the International Musician were about early music and HIP.

Babitz's interest in early performance practices was first sparked after reading publications by Arnold Dolmetsch. In 1936, at the age of 25, he formed a strong opinion that he had not been taught to perform the music of Johann Sebastian Bach correctly, and thus began a decades long scholarly interest into the techniques and instruments of the Baroque period. He was a unique figure for his time, as other scholars in the HIP movement at that point in history were largely focused on earlier Medieval and Renaissance music, and he was the first HIP scholar to devote himself to an in-depth study of performances practices of the Baroque period. Babitz was quoted as saying the following in an article published in the Los Angeles Times in 1952:

I, as a performer, have found that ignorance of historical facts can be a barrier in search for the spirit and substance [of truth]. When J. S. Bach died his music was considered old-fashioned and was soon forgotten, and with it was lost the Baroque tradition of performance. When Bach was rediscovered in the 19th century he was played in the Romantic spirit by musicians who did not trouble to study early performance practice. We who have inherited this tradition, based on ignorance, have the choice of accepting it without question or digging into the past in order to dig ourselves out of a lie.

In the 1940s Babitz built his own clavichord and did intensive research into meantone temperament, a topic that was highly controversial at that time. He was the recipient of the Ford Foundation (1961 and 1963) and Fulbright Foundation research grants which enabled him to tour Europe and study 17th- and 18th-century instruments and instrument technique, and singing practices. He was particularly interested in differences between modern and Baroque tonguing and bowing practices, and pioneered research into the Baroque rhythmic practice of notes inégales. He also advocated for a more florid form of Baroque ornamentation that was controversial at the time. While studying in Europe from 1960 to 1963 he performed and recorded in concerts with harpsichordist Gustav Leonhardt and gave lectures on "Violin Style from the Middle Ages to Mozart". He also made recordings for the Archiv Produktion label.

In the 1950s Babitz was active as a guest lecturer at universities and presented papers at musicology conferences. In 1950 he was the keynote speaker at the a meeting of the California chapter of the American Musicological Society (AMS), presenting the paper "Comparative Performance Practices of Modern and 18th Century Violins and Bows". In 1952 he was a panelist for the String Forum at the convention of the Music Teachers Association of California (MTAC), and was a presenter at the 1956 MTAC convention. In 1954 he presented the session "Demonstrations of Basic Differences Between 18th Century and Modern Violins, Bows, Technic" at the national conference of the AMS held at the University of Michigan (UM). He subsequently presented at the convention of the California Music Educators Association (1956). Universities where he gave guest lectures included Princeton University (1952), the University of Illinois (1955), the UM (1955), the University of California, Los Angeles (1958), and the University of California, Berkeley (1958). In 1958 he was the featured guest on Lorser Feitelson's television program in the episode entitled "The Baroque in Music and Art".

Babitz continued to work as a lecturer and presenter in the 1960s and 1970s. Conferences he presented at included Music Teachers Western Division (1960), the Music Teachers National Association (1960), the American String Teachers Association (1964), the International Music Educators Clinic (1965, University of Vermont), and the International String Conference held at West Chester State College (1966 1967, 1971, and 1972). In 1970 he was a guest speaker at the conference of the International Musicological Society in Bonn, Germany. In 1979 he was a guest lecturer at the Temple University Music Festival in Philadelphia. Other institutions he guest lectured (often in lecture-recital format) included the String Symposium at the Berkshire Music Center during the Tanglewood Music Festival (1963) Pomona College (1963), Los Angeles City College (1964), West Chester University (1965), the University of North Carolina (1965), University at Buffalo (1965), University of Redlands (1968), Stanford University (1970), Immaculata University (1973), the University of California, San Diego (1976), and Columbia University among others.

=== Early Music Laboratory ===
With keyboardist Wesley Kuhnle he co-founded the Early Music Laboratory (EML) in Los Angeles, a group which performed and recorded concerts of early music based on Babitz's research in music performance practices of the 17th and 18th centuries. When approaching 17th- and 18th-century literature he advocated for a lighter tone than the modern orchestra, freedom of rhythm within the beat, clear articulation, and the use of metric accents. He also advocated for use of the two-fingered scale rather than using modern fingering, because that type of fingering better accommodated the construction and design of period instruments, and had an impact on the style of the period.

Sources disagree about when the EML organization was founded. Grove Music Online states that the EML was founded in 1948, while musicologist Dorothy Lamb Crawford asserts it was established sometime in the 1950s with the backing of Stravinsky. California newspaper articles announced the founding of the organization at the time of the EML's first public concert which was given in November 1960. However, the 1948 date does match a different newly created early music ensemble in which Babitz and Kuhnle performed, The New Friends of Old Music. This group was established by Peter Yates as part of the 1948–1949 season of EOR concerts with Babitz and Kuhnle as co-directors of the musical forces. The pair led this group in an annual series of concert at the EOR through at least 1952. The group also gave performances at Arizona State College (1950 and 1951), and the Los Angeles County Museum of Art (1950, 1951, 1952, 1953, and 1954). According to Crawford, Babitz left the EOR early music group after this to found the EML.

Performers in early EML concerts in 1960 included soprano Marni Nixon and harpsichordist Mildred Portney Chase in addition to Babitz playing violin. Musicians who became members of the group and occasionally lent their talents included Stravinsky, Aaron Copland, and George Szell. Szell notably adapted many of Babitz's performance practice ideals in his recordings with the Cleveland Orchestra. Babitz and the EML often performed concerts and gave demonstration lectures at universities and music conferences. The organization also published its own journal, the Bulletin of the Early Music Laboratory.

=== Reception ===
Babitz was known for being fanatical about his approach to early performance, and at times could be belligerent and caustic. His ideas at the time were radical and he disconcerted many musicologists and musicians of his era both with his ideas and the ardent manner in which he communicated those ideas. At one conference he got into a heated verbally abusive argument with musicologist Robert Donington that nearly escalated into physical violence. Composer Grant Beglarian stated of Babitz that "He's a fanatic and he's intolerant. But he is a man of grand illusion and I find him very attractive for that."

Babitz was twice evicted by the police from meetings of the American Musicological Society, and famously derided ensembles playing Baroque music using modern orchestra styles and techniques as "sewing machine Bach" for its overly rigid mechanical approach to the literature. He also advocated to "de-Wagnerize" the practice of music before 1850 in which he attacked the use of long legato lines and articulation practice unsuitable to the Baroque and Classical eras. His criticisms and ideas were elaborated on in his books The Great Baroque Hoax: A Guide to Baroque Performance (1970) and Vocal De-Wagnerization and Other Matters (1973, co-authored with Graham Pont). The earlier book included an LP of Babitz playing a restored Baroque era violin.

Despite negative reaction to Babitz's views in the mid-20th century, Joel Cohen of the Boston Camerata stated the following in his 1985 book Reprise: the Extraordinary Revival of Early Music "The courageous Sol Babitz experimented with Baroque violin techniques back in the 1950s: his ideas seemed outlandish to many at the time, but most of his positions have since been vindicated.”

== Personal life and death ==
In 1936 Babitz married his first wife Rose Zameres. While still married to Rose he met the artist Lily Mae Laviolette, known as Mae, who was also married to a man named Pancho. They began an extra-marital affair which led to Mae getting pregnant. They decided to divorce their current spouses, and Sol and Mae were married in January 1943. Their daughter, artist and writer Eve Babitz, was born four months later on May 13, 1943. A second daughter, designer, concert promoter and psychotherapist Mirandi Babitz, was born in 1946.

The Babitz family lived at the foot of Hollywood Hills in a home at the corner of Cheremoya and Chula Vista. Their residence was a musical and artistic salon that attracted a range of creatives. Some of the people in Babitz's social circle included poets Kenneth Patchen, Edward James, Gregory Corso, Kenneth Rexroth, Laura Riding, and Allen Ginsberg; actors Charlie Chaplin and Greta Garbo; conductor Robert Craft; composers Bernard Herrmann, Harry Lubin, Dahl, and Stravinsky; dancer Vera de Bosset Stravinsky; jazz musicians Fats Waller, Jelly Roll Morton and Stuff Smith; music critic Peter Yates; singers Marni Nixon, Franco Corelli, and Marilyn Horne; violinist Joseph Szigeti; and artist Eugene Berman.

Babitz and his wife were both members of the Committee for Simon Rodia's Towers in Watts from the time it was established in 1958. He remained in that position until his death, and his wife continued in that role until 1998. The Babitz family were financial supporters of the towers, and helped rescue them from being demolished.

Sol Babitz died in Los Angeles on February 18, 1982. The cause was Huntington's disease.

== Partial list of recordings ==
- Charles Ives: Sonata No. 2 for Violin and Piano, movements ii–iii (Sol Babitz [vn] and Ingolf Dahl [pf]; for Alco label, issued c1947)
