= Lili Anolik =

American writer and editor

Lili Anolik is an American writer, editor, and podcaster focused on telling the stories of American authors and cultural figures. She is a contributing editor at Vanity Fair.

== Early life and education ==
Anolik grew up in the suburbs of Boston, MA. Anolik graduated from Princeton University where she majored in English. At Princeton, she played tennis and in her senior year wrote for The Daily Princetonian.

In 2003, Anolik received a degree from the Graduate School of Arts & Sciences of Boston University.

== Career ==
After graduating from Princeton in 2000, Anolik worked for a year at IMG in Los Angeles.

In 2020, Anolik and Ashley West hosted the podcast Once Upon a Time…in the Valley about pornstar Traci Lords.

In 2021, Anolik hosted the podcast Once Upon a Time...at Bennington College a 14 episode podcast about the literary culture at Bennington College in the 1980s.

== Awards and honors ==
In 2024, Anolik was a finalist for the National Magazine Award for profile writing.

== Personal life ==
Anolik is married to dermatologist Robert Anolik.

== Books ==
- Didion & Babitz (Atlantic, 2024)
- Hollywood's Eve: Eve Babitz and the Secret History of L.A. (Scribner, 2019)
- Dark Rooms (William Morrow, 2015)
