= Heartbeat Like a Drum =

1986 song by A Flock of Seagulls

Single by A Flock of Seagulls

from the album Dream Come True
- Released: 10 February 1986
- Genre: Bubblegum; electro-funk
- Length: 5:32 (album version); 6:52 (full length version); 3:59 (single version)
- Label: Jive
- Songwriters: Mike Score; Ali Score; Frank Maudsley
- Producers: Mike Score; Wayne Brathwaite

A Flock of Seagulls singles chronology
"Who's That Girl (She's Got It)" (1985)	"Heartbeat Like a Drum" (1986)	"Magic" (1989)

Music video
- "Heartbeat Like a Drum" on YouTube

"Heartbeat Like a Drum" is a song by English new wave band A Flock of Seagulls, released by Jive on 10 February 1986 as the second and final single from their fourth studio album Dream Come True. The song was written by Mike Score, Ali Score and Frank Maudsley, and produced by Mike Score and Wayne Brathwaite.

== Background ==
Following the tour for their 1984 album The Story of a Young Heart, A Flock of Seagulls took a year's break before writing began for their fourth studio album, Dream Come True. "Heartbeat Like a Drum" was one of the first songs to be written for the album. In a 1986 interview with Detroit Free Press, Mike Score commented, "One of the first songs I wrote was 'Heartbeat Like a Drum', which set the stage for a few changes. I said to the rest of the band, 'Maybe we should become a bit more dance-oriented again'."

== Release ==
In the UK and certain European territories, "Heartbeat Like a Drum" was the second single from Dream Come True, following the 1985 release of "Who's That Girl (She's Got It)". The song failed to reach the top 100 of the UK Singles Chart, stalling at number 119. In North America, "Heartbeat Like a Drum" was issued as the album's only single. It achieved some club play in the US, reaching number 8 on the "Breakouts" section of the Billboard Hot Dance/Disco Club Play chart on 25 April 1986.

== Music video ==
The song's music video was directed by Michael Geoghegan and produced by Vivian Horne for Vivian Horne Productions. It achieved light rotation on MTV.

== Critical reception ==
Upon its release, Jerry Smith of Music Week wrote, "Sounding very much like a conglomeration of all their past singles, with the same vocal inflections, same synth beat, and with that awful disorted guitar riff repeated yet again, it seems that Mike Score and friends have got themselves in a rut and this certainly is not going to get them out of it." Paolo Hewitt of NME stated, "Group with stupid haircuts make a single to match and add, I quote, 'a good dancey sound'. If you dance like that geezer in Fine Young Cannibals then this is the one for you. As for the rest of the world's population, I think they've slightly miscalculated on this one." In the US, John Leland of Spin was mixed in his review, describing it as a "pleasantly insipid single". He noted how "every production gimmick you could ask for bangs you squarely in the head, then returns every 10 seconds or so for an encore", but added that the song "dances on a pretty irresistible teenybopper hook that's bubblegum enough to deflate any studio excesses".

In a review of the music video, Ethlie Ann Vare, writing for the Newspaper Enterprise Association, gave a grade C and described it as "not bad enough to be camp, and not good enough to be anything else". She wrote, "Remember Phil Collins' pastiche clip of 'Don't Lose My Number', where he lampooned video clichés by utilizing all of them? A Flock of Seagulls do the same thing here – only they aren't joking." In a retrospective review of Dream Come True, Dan LeRoy of AllMusic considered it to be a "memorable single with its chattering sequencers and colorful production tricks", adding that it "seemed like an endearing attempt to re-create Scritti Politti's bubblegum electro-funk".

== Track listing ==
7–inch single (UK, the Netherlands and Canada)

1. "Heartbeat Like a Drum" – 3:59
2. "Heartbeat Like a Drum" (Full Length Version) – 6:52

7–inch single (UK, with free single)

1. "Heartbeat Like a Drum" – 3:59
2. "Heartbeat Like a Drum" (Full Length Version) – 6:52
3. "Wishing (If I Had a Photograph of You)" – 4:00
4. "Committed" – 2:50

7–inch single (Philippines)

1. "Heartbeat Like a Drum" – 3:59
2. "The Story of a Young Heart" – 4:09

12–inch single (UK and the Netherlands)

1. "Heartbeat Like a Drum" (Long Version) – 6:57
2. "(Cosmos) The Effect of the Sun" – 12:26
3. "Heartbeat Like a Drum" (Short Version) – 4:00

12–inch single (Canada)

1. "Heartbeat Like a Drum" (Long Version) – 6:55
2. "Heartbeat Like a Drum" – 3:59
3. "Heartbeat Like a Drum" (Long Version) – 6:55
4. "(Cosmos) The Effect of the Sun" – 12:29

12–inch promotional single (US)

1. "Heartbeat Like a Drum" (Club Mix) – 6:55
2. "(Cosmos) The Effect of the Sun" – 12:29
3. "Heartbeat Like a Drum" (Edit) – 3:59
4. "Heartbeat Like a Drum" (LP Version) – 5:30

== Personnel ==
Credits are adapted from the Dream Come True vinyl LP liner notes and the UK 12-single vinyl single.

A Flock of Seagulls

- Mike Score – vocals, keyboards
- Frank Maudsley – bass
- Ali Score – drums

Additional musicians

- Joe Bogan – lead guitar
- Neil Hubbard – rhythm guitar
- Pete "Q" Harris – Fairlight synthesiser, programming
- Jay Carley – backing vocals
- Beverley Skeete – backing vocals

Production

- Wayne Brathwaite – producer
- Mike Score – producer
- Bryan "Chuck" New – engineer, mixing

== Charts ==
Chart (1986)	Peak position
UK Singles Chart	119
US Billboard Hot Dance/Disco Club Play Breakouts	8
