= Zeebratta =

Studio album by Mike Score
- Released: 1 March 2014 (digital)
- Genre: New wave, pop
- Length: 65:01
- Label: Mike Score
- Producer: Mike Score; Joe Rodriguez; Mikal Read

Singles from Zeebratta
- 1. "All I Wanna Do" Released: 18 February 2013; 2. "Somebody Like You" Released: 11 January 2014

Zeebratta is the debut album of Mike Score, the lead singer of A Flock of Seagulls. It was released on digital download on March 1, 2014, and later released on physical copies. Two singles were released from the album, "All I Wanna Do" and "Somebody Like You".

== Background ==
For the last 30 years, Score has been working on the album's songs. He had shelved his compositions that were not the band's style, and had enough for a solo album. Score had originally planned to release the solo album once the other members had left. When they were gone, however, A Flock of Seagulls were still in popular demand for live shows, so Score hired musicians for a new lineup. This new lineup recorded an album in 1995 entitled The Light at the End of the World, which flopped commercially. Even so, the band was still popular with fans, so Score continued to tour with the band, leaving little time for recording.

In the late 2000s, Score gained more time to work on the album, and worked vigorously. By February 2013, he released the single "All I Wanna Do" (originally recorded in the mid-2000s for the compilation album Trackspotting V) with a music video to go along with it. There was also an announcement made stating that his album was coming soon. The release date was postponed, however, when Score's van was stolen in July. The van contained equipment and clothing, as well as the hard drives storing the tracks for Score's album. Fortunately, Score was able to work with music files from his home in Florida, and used them for his album.

In January 2014, Score released a second single entitled "Somebody Like You". On January 29, he revealed that the album would be released on March 1. Score's website and Twitter account made it official on February 20. Zeebratta was officially released on March 1, 2014 (it was released to iTunes on March 3 due to a technical error).

== Track listing ==
All tracks are written by Mike Score.

No.	Title	Length
1.	"All I Wanna Do"	5:02
2.	"Somebody Like You"	5:01
3.	"Angel"	5:11
4.	"Xtacy"	4:44
5.	"The Girl with Black Eyes"	3:40
6.	"Poor Boy"	4:37
7.	"Take Your Time"	4:40
8.	"I Call Your Name Out"	5:32
9.	"Catsong"	2:44
10.	"Home"	5:01
11.	"Love In"	4:28
12.	"Money"	5:00
13.	"Valentine"	4:55
14.	"Wasteland"	4:00
