= Who's That Girl (She's Got It) =

1985 single by A Flock of Seagulls

Single by A Flock of Seagulls

from the album Dream Come True
- B-side: "Who's That Girl (She's Got It) (Instrumental version)" (7") (12")
- Released: 7 October 1985
- Genre: Synth-pop; disco
- Length: 3:35 (7"); 6:51 (12"); 4:17 (album version)
- Label: Jive
- Songwriter: A Flock of Seagulls
- Producer: Mike Score

A Flock of Seagulls singles chronology
"Remember David" (1984)	"Who's That Girl (She's Got It)" (1985)	"Heartbeat Like a Drum" (1986)

Music video
- "Who's That Girl (She's Got It)" on YouTube

"Who's That Girl (She's Got It)" is a 1985 song by English new wave band A Flock of Seagulls from their 1986 album Dream Come True. The cover of the 7" and 12" singles came in red, blue, yellow, black, and white versions with the front including a picture of Lauren Bacall. Some pressings came on red vinyl with a "hits medley". The song reached No. 66 in the UK despite the album not charting. It was their last single to chart in the UK. The song has a BPM of 144 and plays in 4/4 time signature. Author Dave Thompson notes that the song "marked the end of the classic Seagulls line-up".

== Critical reception ==
On its release, Music Week called "Who's That Girl (She's Got It)" a "lively, bubbling number" and "danceable electronic pop" with "wide enough appeal to chart". Nancy Culp of Record Mirror commented, "To even have the same title as the seminal Eurythmics stunner is sacrilege. To soil its memory with piffle is an even greater crime."

== Charts ==
=== Weekly charts ===
Weekly chart performance for "Who's That Girl (She's Got It)"
Chart (1985)	Peak position
UK Singles (OCC)	66
