= Never Again (The Dancer) =

1984 song by A Flock of Seagulls

Single by A Flock of Seagulls

from the album The Story of a Young Heart
- B-side: "Living in Heaven"
- Released: 1 October 1984
- Length: 5:05 (album version); 3:42 (single version)
- Label: Jive
- Songwriters: Mike Score; Ali Score; Frank Maudsley; Paul Reynolds
- Producer: Steve Lovell

A Flock of Seagulls singles chronology
"The More You Live, the More You Love" (1984)	"Never Again (The Dancer)" (1984)	"Remember David" (1985)

Music video
- "Never Again (The Dancer)" on YouTube

"Never Again (The Dancer)" is a song by English new wave band A Flock of Seagulls, released by Jive Records on 1 October 1984 as the second single from their third studio album, The Story of a Young Heart (1984). It was written by all four band members and was produced by Steve Lovell.

== Background ==
At the time of the album's release, lead vocalist and keyboardist Mike Score considered "Never Again (The Dancer)" to be one of the tracks from The Story of a Young Heart that presented the band's "newer direction". In a 2021 interview with Goldmine, Score recalled that he was "quite a romantically minded boy" at the age when he co-wrote the song. He described the idea behind the lyrics: "I imagined if you had no one and went to a dance club and basically you dance on your own and go into a dream state. At the end of the night, you would walk off and think, never again will I be in love again, but at least I'm a good dancer, ha ha."

== Release ==
"Never Again (The Dancer)" was released as a single in the UK on 1 October 1984. The first 10,000 copies of the 7-inch format were issued in a fold out poster bag. The song failed to enter the top 100 of the UK singles chart, but it did appear on Music Week Airplay Action listings based on the airplay it received on both BBC Radio 1 and regional radio stations during October 1984.

An orchestral version of the song was re-recorded for the band's 2021 album String Theory.

== Music video ==
The song's accompanying music video achieved play on the pan-European television channel Music Box.

== Critical reception ==
Upon its release as a single, reviews were mixed. Paul Bursche of Number One noted that the band's previous single, "The More You Live, the More You Love", was a "slow-burning, smouldering number that never set the charts on fire but hung around for a long time" and predicted "Never Again" would do the same. A reviewer for the Lurgan Mail praised it as a "great record [that] should do well". They added that it was "unmistakably a song from the Seagulls" and "very much in the same vein as previous singles". Music Week listed it as one of their "chart certs" in their 6 October 1984 issue.

A reviewer for the North Wales Weekly News did not consider the single to be "as good as its predecessor". Peter Trollope, writing for the Liverpool Echo, it "should find its way into the lower charts", but added that he "still can't help thinking that within them they have something better to offer".

Danny Kelly of the NME was negative in his review, calling it a "dodgy love song" which is "less interesting than the hairstyle of drummer Ali, and he's bald!" Eleanor Levy of Record Mirror remarked, "Everyone knows what A Flock of Seagulls sound like and all the insults that could be hurled at them have been, so why reopen old wounds?" Frank Edmonds of the Bury Free Press gave the single a 3 out of 10 rating. He described it as "just so boring no one can reasonably be expected to derive enjoyment from it".

== Track listings ==
7-inch single (UK, Germany, Netherlands, South Africa, Canada and Australasia)

1. "Never Again (The Dancer)" – 3:42
2. "Living in Heaven" – 5:30

12-inch single (UK, Germany, Netherlands and Australia)

1. "Never Again (The Dancer)" (dance mix) – 5:12
2. "Living in Heaven" – 5:30
3. "Never Again (The Dancer)" (7" version) – 3:42

12-inch single (Canada)

1. "Never Again (The Dancer)" (LP mix) – 5:05
2. "Never Again (The Dancer)" (dance mix) – 5:12
3. "The More You Live, the More You Love" (Full Moon mix) – 6:10

== Personnel ==
A Flock of Seagulls

- Mike Score – lead vocals, keyboards
- Paul Reynolds – lead guitar
- Frank Maudsley – bass guitar
- Ali Score – drums

Production

- Steve Lovell – production

Other

- Johnathan Elliott – sleeve design
