= Bands Reunited =

American reality television series

- Genre: Reality television
- Created by: The Chatterbox Partnership Ltd (UK)
- Written by: Greg Heller
- Directed by: Steve Jones; David Charles Sullivan
- Presented by: Aamer Haleem
- Country of origin: United States
- Original language: English
- No. of seasons: 2
- No. of episodes: 19

Production
- Running time: 44 minutes
- Production companies: Evolution Media; VH1 Productions

Original release
- Network: VH1
- Release: 19 January 2004 – 1 January 2006

Bands Reunited is a television program produced by VH1 in 2004. Hosted by Aamer Haleem, the show documents attempted reunions of formerly popular musical groups for special concerts in either London or Los Angeles.

A show normally consists of the crew first hunting down the ex-members of the band (often first in a ruse) one-by-one, and convincing them to agree for the one-time concert. The members are "contracted" by signing an LP record by their former band. The band members are interviewed, usually focusing on the reasons of their disbandment. The final segment is the formal reunion of the band in the rehearsing studio, and a joint interview about having disbanded. If the reunion was successful, the episode ends with the final performance.

== Criticism ==
The artificial and invasive nature of the reality show, and the contractual arrangements behind it, have been criticized. Kurt Harland of Information Society detailed his own negative experiences with the program, and how his experiences differed from the portrayal of events as broadcast, on his website; citing examples of misinformation, poor background research and manipulation from the show's production crew, regarding the show to have been more interested in sensationalising his band's breakup than a genuine reunion.

== Bands ==
Band	Formed	Disbanded	Result
ABC	1980	1992	Only Martin Fry and drummer David Palmer reunited; performed "The Look of Love" and "Poison Arrow", with Nick Beggs of Kajagoogoo on bass and additional session musicians. Fry and Palmer later reunited ABC, and released the album Traffic in 2008. Fry released The Lexicon of Love II in 2016.
The Alarm	1981	1991	All members reunited; performed "Sixty Eight Guns" and "Blaze of Glory". A version of the band led by frontman Mike Peters, released a new album titled Under Attack in 2006 and subsequently had a top 30 hit in the UK with the song "Superchannel".
The Beat	1978	1983	David Steele and Andy Cox were both unresponsive to numerous requests to participate, possibly implying a lack of interest in a reunion. The remaining members did not perform although Dave Wakeling did perform with the current version of the Beat at their own concert.
Berlin	1978	1987	All members reunited including original drummer Rod Learned; performed "The Metro" and "No More Words". The band, with no returning members except for lead vocalist Terri Nunn, subsequently released the new studio albums 4Play (of mostly cover songs) in 2005 and Animal in 2013. Nunn reunited with original bandmates John Crawford and David Diamond in 2019 and released their eighth studio album Transcendence. Strings Attached was released in 2020.
Commodores	1968	1981	Four members agreed to take part in the reunion but only 3 members actually arrived. There was no reunion performance.
Dramarama	1982	1994	All members reunited; performed "Anything, Anything (I'll Give You)" and "Last Cigarette". The reunion inspired the band to get back together permanently. The group released a new studio album, Everybody Dies, in 2005.
Extreme	1985	1996	Gary Cherone debated on participating in a reunion while Nuno Bettencourt refused to participate altogether and simultaneously declined an on-camera interview. After a conversation with Cherone, they ultimately decided that a reunion would not occur, citing issues that had been unresolved since disbanding as the main reason. Since then, they have reunited in 2004 and 2006. A full reunion occurred in 2008 and a new studio album, Saudades de Rock, was released that year.
A Flock of Seagulls	1980	1986	All members reunited; performed "I Ran (So Far Away)" and "Space Age Love Song". The original lineup released Ascension in 2018. String Theory was released in 2021.
Frankie Goes to Hollywood	1980	1987	All members reunited, but Holly Johnson refused to perform. In 2004, part of the band, not including Johnson, performed at the Prince's Trust charity concert, and they toured some over the next couple years. In 2023, the entire band, including Johnson, performed at the Eurovision Song Contest during a tribute to Liverpool music. It was their first performance as a full group since 1987.
Generation X	1976	1981	No reunion occurred after Billy Idol refused to reunite (as he was in the middle of recording the studio album Devil's Playground)
Haircut One Hundred	1980	1984	All members reunited; performed "Love Plus One" and "Fantastic Day". The group subsequently reunited sporadically between 2009 and 2013 and released a live album in 2011.
Information Society	1982	1997	All members but Kurt Harland reunited; no performance. The band was eventually reformed in 2006 by Paul Robb and James Cassidy, with Harland occasionally participating (he has since rejoined full-time). The band subsequently recorded three new albums following their reunion.
Kajagoogoo	1978	1985	All members reunited, performing "Too Shy" and "Hang on Now". Attempted to stay reunited, initially failed. The band regrouped in 2008 and released a new studio album, Gone to the Moon, minus Limahl and Jez Strode, and the EP Death Defying Headlines with the complete lineup in 2011.
Klymaxx	1979	1994	Five members reunited (Robbin Grider could not be located), but Cheryl Cooley did not participate in the performance due to friction between her and the other bandmates for forming her own version of Klymaxx, and trademarking the band name without permission. There are now three separate Klymaxx bands: one led by Cooley, one led by Bernadette Cooper, and one led by Joyce Irby.
The Motels	1971	1987	All members reunited. The band, with no returning members except for lead vocalist Martha Davis, subsequently released three new studio albums in 2008, 2011, and 2018.
New Kids on the Block	1984	1994	Brothers Jonathan and Jordan Knight agreed to reunite, but Joe McIntyre, Donnie Wahlberg, and Danny Wood declined to participate in the reunion. McIntyre cited that the only way he would rejoin the group was if the group made the decision to reunite permanently. Wahlberg and Wood declined on-camera interviews. All five members reunited in 2008, and have since released three albums and one EP.
Romeo Void	1979	1985	Original saxophonist Benjamin Bossi was unable to perform, due to hearing loss. All other members performed "Never Say Never" and "A Girl in Trouble (Is a Temporary Thing)" with Sheldon Brown on saxophone. Bossi met with his former bandmates, however, and watched the taping of the band's reunion performance from a nearby trailer.
Scandal	1981	1985	All surviving members reunited (bassist Ivan Elias died of cancer in 1995); performed "Goodbye to You" and "The Warrior" with Kasim Sulton of the band Utopia on bass.
Shalamar	1977	1983	Howard Hewett agreed to reunite, but Jody Watley realized the show's plan and declined to participate for the reunion.
Squeeze	1974	1999	The band did not reunite after lead vocalist/guitarist Glenn Tilbrook expressed reservations, keyboardist Jools Holland refused to participate, and drummer Gilson Lavis was unable to commit to it. Squeeze reformed in 2007 with a revised line-up, including original members Chris Difford and Glenn Tilbrook and early 1980s bassist John Bentley. The band subsequently released three new albums: Spot the Difference (2010), Cradle to the Grave (2015), and The Knowledge (2017).
Vixen	1980	1992	All members of the most famous lineup reunited; performed "Edge of a Broken Heart" and "Rev It Up". Although guitarist Jan Kuehnemund continued to front her own version of Vixen following the show, the original lineup did not reunite again until 2012, shortly before Kuehnemund's death the next year; the remaining members have since continued the band.
Wire Train	1983	1992	This episode never aired. They played "Chamber of Hellos".
