= Hunte (surname) =

Hunte is a surname. Notable people with the surname include:

- Conrad Hunte, West Indian cricketer
- Heather Hunte (born 1959), British actress
- Julian Hunte (born 1940), foreign minister of Saint Lucia
- Neville Hunte (born 1948), Guyanese cyclist
- O. D. Hunte, British record producer
- Silvia Hunte (born 1938), Panamanian sprinter
- Terry Hunte (born 1962), Barbadian cricketer
- Torino Hunte (born 1990), Dutch footballer
