= Ascension (A Flock of Seagulls album) =

2018 studio album by A Flock of Seagulls

Studio album by A Flock of Seagulls with the Prague Philharmonic Orchestra
- Released: 6 July 2018
- Recorded: 2017–2018
- Studio: Smecky (Prague); OD Hunte; Parr Street (Liverpool); Evenform
- Genre: New wave; orchestral
- Length: 51:50
- Label: August Day
- Producer: John Bryan; Sare Havlicek

A Flock of Seagulls chronology
The Light at the End of the World (1995)	Ascension (2018)	String Theory (2021)

Singles from Ascension
- 1. "Space Age Love Song" Released: 8 June 2018; 2. "I Ran (So Far Away)" Released: 7 December 2018; 3. "Wishing (If I Had a Photograph of You)" Released: 14 June 2019

Ascension is the collaborative debut album by English new wave band A Flock of Seagulls, released on 6 July 2018 by August Day Recordings. It is the band's first album since 1984's The Story of a Young Heart that features all four original members. It contains 12 songs (11 from the first three albums and one new song) re-recorded with the Prague Philharmonic Orchestra. The album debuted and peaked at No. 8 on Billboard's Top Classical Albums chart for the week of 21 July 2018 and at No. 29 on the UK Independent Albums Chart for the week of 13 July 2018.

== History ==
In 2017, Mike Score was approached by John Bryan of August Day Recordings regarding the creation of an orchestral album. Intrigued, Mike agreed to the possibility. Upon hearing the offer, the rest of the original band–consisting of Frank Maudsley, Paul Reynolds, and Ali Score–jumped on board as well. On 3 May 2018, Ascension was officially announced.

In making the album, Mike preferred to not change the songs too much owing partly to his penchant for not enjoying live performances where bands alter their music. He also felt that this was the easiest and quickest way to work due to time constraints. He stated, "We wanted to make it easy for ourselves and let the record company do the work, because it was really their idea." As the band was not familiar with orchestras, an orchestral arranger was brought in to handle the arrangements.

Although the album was recorded in separate studios, Mike, Maudsley, and Reynolds reunited in Liverpool for a day to record the music video for the orchestral version of "Space Age Love Song". Video involving Ali was added into the finished version, which premiered on YouTube 6 June.

A five-track EP was digitally released 8 June 2018, that features five versions of "Space Age Love Song". On 6 July, the album was released digitally and in select stores, although physical copies were available for purchase online prior to the release date. A limited edition special set was also available, which contained five CD's, four signed postcards, and two stickers. The five CD's are: Ascension, Ascension (Instrumental), Ascension (Orcapella), Aurora Borealis – The Greatest Hits, and an 8-track single of "Space Age Love Song". Aurora Borealis – The Greatest Hits does not contain the orchestra, but instead includes re-recordings of the original tracks from the main album (excluding "Ascension").

On 7 December, "I Ran (So Far Away)" was also released as a single. It includes eight alternate versions of the song along with the orchestral and re-recorded version. On 11 June 2019, the Inflight album was announced. It contains extended and instrumental versions of the tracks featured on Aurora Borealis – The Greatest Hits with the exception of "Telecommunication". "Wishing (If I Had a Photograph of You)" was made as a single to be included with the set. The Inflight Tour spanned the UK from 11–19 July; it did not feature the original lineup featured on the album.

== Critical reception ==
Professional ratings
Review scores
Source	Rating
Cryptic Rock	5/5 stars
Louder Than War	favourable
The Spill Magazine	4/5 stars

The website Cryptic Rock gave Ascension a perfect five-star rating, saying: "It is a grand production that is wonderfully recorded, produced, and mastered" and "retains the magic of the original tunes, but while interjecting new dynamics thanks to The Prague Philharmonic Orchestra." Paul Scott-Bates of Louder Than War stated it is "a good solid album" and had an affinity for "I Ran (So Far Away)", writing that the Prague Philharmonic "adds an air of grandiose...and makes the song a dramatic spectacle. As an opener to the album, it really couldn't be much better."

Aaron Badgley of The Spill Magazine wrote that the band still "play extremely well together and the core unit is as tight as they have ever been" and "the orchestra provides a whole new aspect to these songs."

John Earls of Classic Pop reviewed the Inflight release and gave it a five out of ten. He stated: "Inflight's premise is intriguing...[b]ut that's twice now the band have remained in the comfort zone." He would have preferred to hear new songs from the band, as opposed to 12″ remixes.

== Track listing ==
All tracks are written by Mike Score, Ali Score, Frank Maudsley and Paul Reynolds.

No.	Title	Length
1.	"I Ran" (orchestral version)	6:22
2.	"Modern Love Is Automatic" (orchestral version)	3:39
3.	"Telecommunication" (orchestral version)	2:31
4.	"Space Age Love Song" (orchestral version)	5:09
5.	"Ascension"	1:12
6.	"Wishing (If I Had a Photograph of You)" (orchestral version)	5:32
7.	"Nightmares" (orchestral version)	4:38
8.	"DNA" (orchestral version)	2:39
9.	"Electrics" (orchestral version)	4:22
10.	"Transfer Affection" (orchestral version)	5:42
11.	"The More You Live, the More You Love" (orchestral version)	4:28
12.	"Man Made" (orchestral version)	5:35
Total length:		51:50

== Personnel ==
Credits adapted from the liner notes of Ascension.

A Flock of Seagulls

- Mike Score – keyboards, vocals
- Ali Score – drums
- Frank Maudsley – bass
- Paul Reynolds – guitar

Additional personnel

- John Bryan, Sare Havlicek – production
- Sare Havlicek, Jan Holzner, OD Hunte, Robin Lee, Jesse Clark, Damian Hasbun – engineering
- Sare Havlicek – programming
- James Fitzpatrick – Prague Philharmonic Orchestra supervisor
- Pete Whitfield, Mike Score, John Bryan, Sare Havlicek – orchestral arrangements
- Sare Havlicek – mixing
- Yuri Dent – mastering
- Peter Reynolds – artwork

== Charts ==
Chart performance for Ascension
Chart (2018)	Peak position
UK Independent Albums (OCC)	29
US Top Classical Albums (Billboard)	8
