= Dream Come True (A Flock of Seagulls album) =

Studio album by A Flock of Seagulls
- Released: 10 March 1986
- Recorded: 1985
- Studio: Battery Studios, London
- Genre: Synth-pop; R&B
- Label: Jive
- Producer: Mike Score, Wayne Brathwaite

A Flock of Seagulls chronology
The Story of a Young Heart (1984)	Dream Come True (1986)	The Light at the End of the World (1995)

Singles from Dream Come True
- 1. "Who's That Girl (She's Got It)" Released: 7 October 1985; 2. "Heartbeat Like a Drum" Released: 10 February 1986

Professional ratings
Review scores
Source	Rating
AllMusic	2.5/5 stars
The Encyclopedia of Popular Music	2/5 stars
Record Mirror	1/5 stars
The Rolling Stone Album Guide	1/5 stars
Sounds	1/5 stars

Dream Come True is the fourth album by English new wave band A Flock of Seagulls, released on 10 March 1986 by Jive Records.

== Background ==
After the release and tour for the band's previous album, The Story of a Young Heart, guitarist Paul Reynolds had left the band for personal reasons. Brothers Mike and Ali Score wanted to base the band out of Philadelphia, Pennsylvania. With past success in the USA, both brothers thought leaving the UK and a new life in America was a perfect solution. With the popularity of the first three albums and the name "A Flock of Seagulls" still having some equity, they had 4 straight sell-out shows in Philadelphia. Mike, Ali and Frank Maudsley all applied for and were conditionally awarded green cards based on celebrity status under the O-1 work visa. The conditional approval was granted to all three, who settled in Philadelphia.

Maudsley soon became disillusioned with living in a strange city; he loved A Flock of Seagulls but had no family. Missing the UK, he returned to England. Mike and Ali stayed in Philadelphia and satisfied the terms of the visa. With Frank in Britain and the brothers in the USA it would appear the band was split into two camps. In fact, it was Frank Maudsley who kept the band communicating. Ultimately, the brothers had a falling out and the band dissolved; with Ali moving to Boston. Ali played in a hard rock band and then worked for a computer company in Cambridge once the work visa turned into a permanent residency.

== Recording history ==
In a 1986 interview with Gary Graff of Free Press Music, Mike noted that, after writing "Heartbeat Like a Drum", he decided the band should become more dance-oriented again. Originally, the album was to be solo material, but the record company believed it would be better suited under the band's name. As they couldn't find a producer they wanted to work with, it was suggested that Mike take on the task of producing instead. Dream Come True would be the first album he would produce.

Maudsley was the go-between for the brothers and, during the recording of Dream Come True, some have indicated that Ali played on only 3 songs, Maudsley on 4 and Mike did all 9. One of the songs that all three did play on was entitled "Cosmos (Effect of the Sun)" and was dropped from the album. This dropping of the song brought the track listing down to 9 songs for the album. A large row ensued where Maudsley and Ali wanted to drop "Love on Your Knees" and include "Cosmos." It was with this argument that two videos, "Who's That Girl (She's Got It)" and "Heartbeat Like a Drum," were filmed in quick succession. These two videos were the last time the three remaining members were together in a recording or music capacity until 2004.

The tour for the album added Chris Chryssaphis on keyboards and Gary Steadman—formerly of the new wave band Classix Nouveaux—as a replacement for Paul Reynolds on lead guitar. Both new additions did not stay in the band after the tour ended.

In 2004, the album was released on CD for the first time by Almacantar Records. It featured no bonus tracks. In 2011, the album was remastered on CD by Cherry Red. It included the 7" and 12" versions of "Who's That Girl (She's Got It)" and "Heartbeat Like A Drum," and "(Cosmos) The Effect Of The Sun" as bonus tracks.

== Reception ==
The album failed to chart on either side of the Atlantic and thus was a commercial failure. It also received generally negative reviews. Music Week called for "hiatus time for the 'Gulls, both artistically and commercially" and summarised, "From the uninspired title to the often cluttered songs, this LP tells the story of a band not quite up to their best." Robin Smith of Record Mirror noted that the "utterly depressing" band "sound as if they've become Outer Mongolia's answer to Duran Duran". He felt all the songs "sound very sparse", with "Heartbeat Like a Drum" being "a third rate imitation of Hall & Oates" and "Who's That Girl" containing "some of the most clichéd embarrassingly awful lyrics I've heard".

In the US, Billboard considered it a "strong comeback bid" from a band "that has so far failed to successfully follow through on its initial strong debut", whereas People found the songwriting to be "ineffective" and the album itself to be "all formula and flourish with no substance". Regardless, they felt that Dream Come True had a "much stronger [and] pervasive" beat than the previous LPs from the band. Dan LeRoy from AllMusic retrospectively called the songs "lifeless."

== Track listing ==
All tracks are written by A Flock of Seagulls (Mike Score, Ali Score and Frank Maudsley).

No.	Title	Length
1.	"Better & Better"	5:21
2.	"Heartbeat Like a Drum"	5:33
3.	"Who's That Girl (She's Got It)"	4:17
4.	"Hot Tonight"	5:56
5.	"Cry Like a Baby"	6:28
6.	"Say So Much"	3:35
7.	"Love on Your Knees"	3:57
8.	"How Could You Ever Leave Me"	3:24
9.	"Whole Lot of Loving"	6:03
Total length:		44:35

CD Bonus Tracks (2011, Cherry Red)

No.	Title	Length
10.	"Who's That Girl (She's Got It) (Extended Version)"	6:53
11.	"Who's That Girl (She's Got It) (7" Version)"	3:38
12.	"Heartbeat Like a Drum (12" Version)"	6:57
13.	"Heartbeat Like a Drum (7" Version)"	4:01
14.	"(Cosmos) The Effect of the Sun"	12:30

Total length: 1:18:42

== Personnel ==
A Flock of Seagulls

- Mike Score – lead vocals, keyboards, guitar
- Frank Maudsley – bass
- Ali Score – drums

Additional Musicians

- Pete "Q" Harris – Fairlight programming
- Phil Nicholas – Fairlight programming (7)
- Mike Irving – lead guitar (1, 3, 6, 8)
- Joel Bogan – lead guitar (2)
- Keith Moore – lead guitar (4)
- Gus Isadore – lead guitar (5, 9)
- Becky Boone – flute sequence (4)
- Jay Carley – backing vocals (1, 2, 7)
- Beverley Skeete – backing vocals (1, 2, 7)
- Carmen Manley – backing vocals (3)
- Karen Kay – backing vocals (4, 6)
- Dee Lewis – backing vocals (5, 8, 9)
- Shirley Lewis – backing vocals (5, 8, 9)

Production

- Mike Score – producer
- Wayne Brathwaite – producer (2, 7, 9)
- Steve McGlaughlin – engineer (1, 3–6, 8)
- Brian "Chuck" New – engineer (2, 7), mixing (2, 7)
- Steve Power – engineer (9)
- Simon Hanhart – mixing (1, 4, 6, 8)
- Nigel Green – mixing (3)
- Jeremy Allon – mixing (5)
- Steve Power – mixing (8)
