= String Theory (A Flock of Seagulls album) =

Studio album by A Flock of Seagulls with the Slovenian Symphonic Film Orchestra
- Released: 20 August 2021
- Recorded: 2018–2021
- Studio: Tokyorama Studio Ljubljana, Slovenia; Loop Studio Trieste, Italy
- Genre: New wave, orchestral
- Length: 47:54
- Label: August Day
- Producer: John Bryan, Sare Havlicek

A Flock of Seagulls with the Slovenian Symphonic Film Orchestra chronology
Ascension (2018)	String Theory (2021)	Some Dreams (2024)

Singles from String Theory
- 1. "Say You Love Me" Released: 23 July 2021; 2. "Messages" Released: 22 April 2022; 3. "Remember David" Released: 24 March 2023

String Theory is the collaborative second album by the English band A Flock of Seagulls, recorded with the Slovenian Symphonic Film Orchestra. Released on 20 August 2021, it is the band's second album featuring orchestral renditions of their songs, following the 2018 album Ascension. String Theory was recorded at Tokyorama Studio in Ljubljana, Slovenia and Loop Studio in Trieste, Italy.

== History ==
The album brings another part of the group's songs from their first three albums and the band's fifth album, once again featuring a partnership between the original members of the band, some guest musicians and the Slovenian Symphonic Film Orchestra. It was announced on the group's social media on May 10, 2021 and has as its lead single the song ''Say You Love Me'', a song that originally came from the group's fifth album The Light at the End of the World in 1995.

In an interview with vocalist Mike Score, it was revealed that this album came after a request from the record company to choose which new songs would be featured on this new compilation of orchestral songs. As with Ascension, the orchestral arrangements do not deviate from the originals but serve to "[give] them a new vibe."

The promotional video was recorded by August Day Records with dancers as well as the band's vocalist, the single was released on July 23, 2021. The album was officially released on August 20, 2021, on digital platforms such as Deezer, Spotify and also in physical versions that are sold on Amazon and on the band's and record label's own website.

== Track listing ==
No.	Title	Length
1.	''Loves Overture''	0:47
2.	"Say You Love Me (Orchestral Version)"	5:02
3.	"Messages (Orchestral Version)"	2:52
4.	"Never Again (The Dancer) (Orchestral Version)"	4:53
5.	''Remember David (Orchestral Version)''	4:06
6.	"Hearts on Fire (Orchestral Version)"	4:36
7.	"The Story of a Young Heart (Orchestral Version)"	6:10
8.	"What You Said, What You Meant (Orchestral Version)"	4:42
9.	"Living in Heaven (Orchestral Version)"	5:28
10.	"What Am I Supposed to Do (Orchestral Version)"	4:12
11.	"Rainfall (Orchestral Version)"	5:02
Total length:		47:54

== Personnel ==
Credits adapted from the liner notes of String Theory.

A Flock of Seagulls

- Mike Score – vocals, rhythm guitar, keyboards
- Sare Havlicek – keyboards, programming
- Paul Reynolds – lead guitar
- Slava Voroshnin – lead guitar, bass, programming
- Frank Maudsley – bass
- Denis Susin – bass
- Ali Score – drums
- Charlie Pine – drums

Additional personnel

- John Bryan – production
- Sare Havlicek – production, mixing, orchestral arrangements
- Pete Whitfield – orchestral arrangements
- John Bryan – orchestral arrangements
- Eugene – mastering
- William P – artwork
- Rich Elson – artwork
