= The Story of a Young Heart =

1984 studio album by A Flock of Seagulls

Studio album by A Flock of Seagulls
- Released: 20 August 1984
- Recorded: 1983–1984
- Studios: Ridge Farm (Capel, England)
- Genres: Europop; art rock
- Length: 42:24
- Label: Jive
- Producer: Steve Lovell

A Flock of Seagulls chronology
Listen (1983)	The Story of a Young Heart (1984)	Dream Come True (1986)

Singles from The Story of a Young Heart
- 1. "The More You Live, the More You Love" Released: 2 July 1984; 2. "Never Again (The Dancer)" Released: 1 October 1984; 3. "Remember David" Released: 1985 (non UK 7″ single)

Professional ratings
Review scores
Source	Rating
AllMusic	3/5 stars
The Encyclopedia of Popular Music	2/5 stars
Smash Hits	6/10

The Story of a Young Heart is the third studio album by A Flock of Seagulls, released on 20 August 1984 by Jive Records. It was their last album—until 2018's Ascension—to feature the original line-up of the band, as guitarist Paul Reynolds left shortly after the album's release. Three singles were released from the album, some only in select countries: "The More You Live, the More You Love", "Never Again (The Dancer)" and "Remember David". The album was reissued in 2008 by Cherry Red Records with bonus tracks.

Lead singer Mike Score has recalled of the album, "The Story of a Young Heart [1984 album], there was some great stuff on that, that weren't hits - there was a bit deeper stuff, like "Suicide Day." To do something like "Suicide Day" after "Space Age Love Song" and "The More You Live" and all that, then you're on a darker track. Stuff like that, I think at that time, it showed where we could have gone if it hadn't have gone awry with the band - we could have become deep and meaningful, kind of an '80s Pink Floyd."

== Reception ==
Tom Demalon from AllMusic retrospectively praised the "less cluttered, more polished" sound of the album's production, but felt the songs lacked warmth. He took a greater liking to songs such as "Over My Head" and "Heart of Steel", and believed that "Remember David" closely recaptured the band's "hyperkinetic glory" of their first two albums.

People stated that the album, at first listen, seemed "unsatisfyingly bloodless and facile", but believed tracks such as "European (I Wish I Was)", "Over My Head", and "Heart of Steel" "tend[ed] to sound better the more they are played."

== Track listing ==
All tracks are written by Mike Score, Ali Score, Frank Maudsley and Paul Reynolds.

No.	Title	Length
1.	"The Story of a Young Heart"	6:07
2.	"Never Again (The Dancer)"	5:05
3.	"The More You Live, the More You Love"	4:10
4.	"European (I Wish I Was)"	4:26
5.	"Remember David"	4:06
6.	"Over My Head"	3:55
7.	"Heart of Steel"	5:45
8.	"The End"	3:34
9.	"Suicide Day"	5:20
Total length:		42:24

2008 Cherry Red CD reissue bonus tracks
No.	Title	Length
10.	"The More You Live, the More You Love" (7″ version)	4:13
11.	"The More You Live, the More You Love" (Full Moon mix)	6:17
12.	"Lost Control (Totally)"	4:12
13.	"Never Again (The Dancer)" (7″ version)	3:46
14.	"Never Again (The Dancer)" (12″ dance mix)	5:17
15.	"Living in Heaven"	5:32
16.	"Remember David" (7″ version)	4:07

== Personnel ==
A Flock of Seagulls

- Mike Score – lead vocals, keyboards, guitar
- Frank Maudsley – bass guitar
- Paul Reynolds - lead guitar
- Ali Score – drums

Additional personnel

- Steve Lovell – production
- Chris Porter – engineering
- Steve Lipson – engineering (4)
- Phil Vinal – engineering
- Sven Taits, Alister Bullock – assistance
- John Reid – bass (2)
- Pete Watson – art direction
- Eric Watson – photography (back)
- Daniel Thistlethwaite – photography (front)
- Ali Score, Weed – photography (inner sleeve)

== Charts ==
Chart performance for The Story of a Young Heart
Chart (1984)	Peak position
Canada Top Albums/CDs (RPM)	32
Dutch Albums (Album Top 100)	17
European Albums (Eurotipsheet)	25
German Albums (Offizielle Top 100)	31
New Zealand Albums (RMNZ)	36
UK Albums (Official Charts)	30
US Billboard 200	66
