= Paul Reynolds (musician) =

English musician

- Born: 4 August 1962 (age 63); Liverpool, Merseyside, England
- Genres: New wave; synth-pop
- Occupations: Singer; songwriter; musician
- Instruments: Vocals; guitar
- Years active: 1979–present
- Labels: Jive; Arista; I.R.S.
- Formerly of: A Flock of Seagulls

Paul Reynolds (born 4 August 1962) is an English singer, songwriter and musician who gained fame as the lead guitarist of the new wave band A Flock of Seagulls. AllMusic writer Tom Demalon praised Reynolds for his unique guitar style, which set his band apart from other synth-heavy acts of the time.

== Early life ==
Paul Reynolds was born in Liverpool, England. In his teens, Reynolds always enjoyed playing the guitar, but in his spare time he enjoyed writing, drawing and was also an amateur photographer.

== Career ==
He briefly joined a local Liverpool band called Visual Aids. Then at the age of 17, he joined the new wave band A Flock of Seagulls, a few months after the band was formed, and came to replace the original guitarist Willie Woo. The group became popular in the early 1980s with the release of "(It's Not Me) Talking," and in 1982 the song "I Ran (So Far Away)" was a hit in the US and at home. By the time he was 21, the band had released an album, won a Grammy Award, got two more hit singles and embarked on a worldwide tour. Reynolds, whose "textural wash" contributed significantly to the group's sound, was praised for his "echo-laden" "unique guitar style", which differentiated A Flock of Seagulls from other synth-heavy bands of the period.

Reynolds left the band in 1984, after the release of The Story of a Young Heart, two years before the band broke up. When it was re-formed in 1989 by singer Mike Score, Reynolds and the remaining members decided not to rejoin. Reynolds and his fellow ex-members did, however, reunite with Score for a one-off performance in London in 2003 for VH1's Bands Reunited television program. Before the performance, Reynolds was interviewed about why he left the band; he claimed that he was too young for the "rock 'n' roll lifestyle" and that he was exhausted from all of the performances.

In 2018, Reynolds and the other original members of the band met with Mike Score to record a new album, the first with the complete classic line-up since 1984, entitled Ascension. The album features the main songs from the band's career accompanied by the Prague Philharmonic Orchestra. In 2019, Reynolds reunited with his former music companions to record an album called Inflight (The Extended Essentials). In 2021, the original lineup again reunited temporarily to record another album with the Prague Philharmonic Orchestra, String Theory.

== Equipment ==
Reynolds played several guitars, including his 1980 Kramer XL-5, mostly used for performances between 1980 and 1984. His XL-5 was a uniquely shaped walnut-bodied electric with an aluminum-framed neck and wooden inserts.

Another guitar that stood out was his red Gibson Firebird Studio, often used live to play songs like "Wishing (If I Had a Photograph You)". It was also used in the clips for "Wishing", "Space Age Love Song" and "The More You Live The More You Love".

Reynolds has also played two different Fender Stratocasters. A black one was used in the "Transfer Affection" clip which he also played live during the band's return tours in 2004. Reynolds used a naturally-finished Strat in the clip for Space Age Love Song with the Prague Philharmonic Orchestra in 2018.

He also had a synthesized Roland G-808 guitar with a wood finish that was used mostly on "Over the Border". Two more guitars he used during his tours with A Flock of Seagulls were a special 1981 Fender Telecaster Black and Gold, which can be seen in the clip for "Never Again (The Dancer)" and a Vantage Avenger that was used in a mimed performance of "I Ran".

Reynolds also used a Roland Jazz Chorus-120 amplifier on tour during the 1980s and a Marshall Lead 100 Mosfet used in the clip "Space Age Love Song in with Orchestra" in 2018. For instrumental performances such as "D.N.A," he used a ProCo The Rat in his performances; this distortion pedal was used a lot when Reynolds was in the band in 1979 and 1984. He also had his studio equipment that was often used in concerts, including the Roland RE-501 Chorus Echo and Roland Chorus Echo SRE-555 that were used on the band's first three albums.

When Reynolds returned to a band in the early 2000s, he used the Lace Sensor Red, Silver, Blue Pickup Set pickups on his Stratocaster.

Inspired by Brian May of Queen, Reynolds used an old English penny in place of a guitar pick.

One of the most famous effects accessories used by Reynolds was the EBow Sound Heet, which was used to make endless harmonics and sharps. He made several solos with this accessory, including in the songs, "Wishing", "Nightmares", "The Fall", "Don't Ask Me" and "European (I Wish I Was)" among others, all performed live.

== Discography ==
- A Flock of Seagulls (1982)
- Listen (1983)
- The Story of a Young Heart (1984)
- Ascension (2018)
- String Theory (2021)
