= The More You Live, the More You Love =

Single by A Flock of Seagulls

from the album The Story of a Young Heart
- B-side: "Lost Control (Totally)"
- Released: 2 July 1984
- Recorded: 1984
- Genre: New wave
- Length: 4:10
- Label: Jive
- Songwriters: Mike Score, Ali Score, Paul Reynolds, Frank Maudsley
- Producer: Steve Lovell

A Flock of Seagulls singles chronology
| "(It's Not Me) Talking" (1983) | "The More You Live, the More You Love" (1984) | "Never Again (The Dancer)" (1984) |

"The More You Live, the More You Love" is a song by A Flock of Seagulls, released as the first single from their third album, The Story of a Young Heart. It is the band's last international hit to date.

The song entered the top 40 in the UK and several other countries, including Germany and New Zealand. In the United States, it peaked at numbers 56 and 10 on the Billboard Hot 100 and Mainstream Rock charts respectively. "The More You Live, the More You Love" had similar success in Belgium (Flanders), where it also peaked at No. 10.

The music video was filmed at Giant's Causeway in Northern Ireland.

== Track listing ==
7" Jive 62 (UK)

| No. | Title | Length |
|---|---|---|
| 1. | "The More You Live, the More You Love (Album Version)" | 4:10 |
| 2. | "Lost Control" | 4:09 |

12" Jive T62 (UK)

| No. | Title | Length |
|---|---|---|
| 1. | "The More You Live, the More You Love (Full Moon Mix)" | 6:10 |
| 2. | "Lost Control (Totally)" | 6:40 |
| 3. | "The More You Live, the More You Love (7" Remix)" | 4:08 |

== Chart positions ==
| Chart (1984) | Peak position |
|---|---|
| UK Singles Chart | 26 |
| Belgium Singles Chart | 10 |
| Germany Singles Chart | 37 |
| Netherlands Singles Chart | 16 |
| New Zealand Singles Charts | 32 |
| US Billboard Hot 100 | 56 |
| US Billboard Mainstream Rock Tracks | 10 |
