= Space Age Love Song =

Single by A Flock of Seagulls

Single by A Flock of Seagulls

from the album A Flock of Seagulls
- B-side: "Standing in the Doorway"; "Windows"
- Released: 28 May 1982
- Recorded: 1981
- Studio: Battery, London
- Genre: New wave; synth-pop
- Length: 3:45
- Label: Jive Records (UK); Teldec (Germany)
- Songwriters: Mike Score; Paul Reynolds; Frank Maudsley; Ali Score
- Producer: Mike Howlett

A Flock of Seagulls singles chronology
"I Ran (So Far Away)" (1982)	"Space Age Love Song" (1982)	"Wishing (If I Had a Photograph of You)" (1982)

Music video
- "Space Age Love Song" on YouTube

"Space Age Love Song" is a song by the British band A Flock of Seagulls, released by Jive on 28 May 1982 as a single from their self-titled debut album. Lead guitarist Paul Reynolds remarked on their 1984 video album Through the Looking Glass that, as the band could not come up with a title for the track, he suggested "Space Age Love Song" because he thought it sounded like a space age love song. The song reached the top 40 in the UK and the US in June 1982 and February 1983 respectively. The music video was directed by Tony van den Ende at Danceteria NY City.

== Background and release ==
Lead singer Mike Score has said of the song's meaning, "'Space Age' was just about intimacy, if you'd like. When you meet somebody there is an instant eye contact if the chemistry is right. If everything is right, you catch their eye... that whole 'across the crowded room/caught your eye' thing. The lyrics explain that: 'I saw your eyes and you made me smile.'"

A music video of the song was produced in 1982 and featured the band miming a performance of the song. The 1982 music video also took place on top of the Danceteria nightclub in New York City. The band made another video in 2018 to coincide with the release of Ascension.

In 2018, a re-recorded version of the song, featuring the Prague Philharmonic Orchestra, was released as a 5-track and 8-track special edition EP. It is the first single from the band's sixth album, Ascension.

== Uses in other media ==
"Space Age Love Song" has appeared in several forms of media. The song is used in the 2006 video game Grand Theft Auto: Vice City Stories, on the in-game station "The Wave 103"; in the films Kickin' It Old Skool and Spider-Man: Homecoming; the tenth episode of the 2009 series Sym-Bionic Titan, "Lessons in Love"; the 2020 docuseries Challenger: The Final Flight; and "Enter Number Two", an episode of Mare of Easttown.

== Track listing ==
7" Jive 17 (UK) – 1982
No.	Title	Length
1.	"Space Age Love Song"	3:20
2.	"Windows"	3:28

CD August Day 39 (UK) – 2018
No.	Title	Length
1.	"Space Age Love Song" (orchestral version)	5:12
2.	"Space Age Love Song" (dub version)	5:45
3.	"Space Age Love Song" (Tiny Magnetic Pets Remix)	6:57
4.	"Space Age Love Song" (Tiny Magnetic Pets Broken Wing Remix)	6:57
5.	"Space Age Love Song" (Orcapella One)	5:13
6.	"Space Age Love Song" (Orcapella Two)	5:13
7.	"Space Age Love Song" (Orchestral Radio Edit)	3:26
8.	"Space Age Love Song" (Orchestral Video Edit)	4:12

== Chart performance ==
Chart performance for "Space Age Love Song"
Chart (1982–1983)	Peak position
Australia (Kent Music Report)	68
New Zealand (Recorded Music NZ)	31
UK Singles (Official Charts)	34
US Billboard Hot 100	30
US Billboard Top Tracks	59
US Cash Box	35
