= O. D. Hunte =

- Origin: Trinidad
- Genres: Soul, R&B, hip hop
- Occupations: Record producer, songwriter, mixer, remixer, music video director
- Instruments: Sampler, keyboards, vocals, drums
- Years active: 1998–present
- Labels: Southern Cuba Records
- Website: odhunte.com

OD Hunte is a London-based music producer, songwriter, rapper and singer. Primarily known for his work in hip hop, OD Hunte has produced albums and singles for a number of artists from the late 1990s to the present day. He has done work with/for Wretch 32, L, Josh Kumra, Emile Sande, Daley, Alex Mills, Leona Lewis, Unkle Jam, Natalia Druyts, Leela James, Mattafix and Ten Days Till. In October 2011, OD Hunte signed a publishing deal with Levels/EMI music publishing.

Hunte is the producer, writer and mixer behind "Get Them Hands Hi" as featured in American Pie Presents: Beta House, Hey Paula, NBA Live 07, Fast Lane and MTV's Taking the Stage.

Trinidadian-born producer/songwriter OD Hunte owes his start in music production in part to the famed producer Teddy Riley. Hunte had already been writing songs for several years when he moved to the United Kingdom, but it wasn't until a friend handed him a DAT of outtakes of the Bobby Brown "Two Can Play That Game" master that he began to really become interested in the art of production.

After graduating with a Physics and Modern Acoustics Degree from the University of Surrey in Guildford, Hunte became one of the first producers in the UK to start selling sample CDs internationally and the resulting Freekee Jack Swing and 96th Street were calling cards for his introduction to LA-based Extreme Music, one of the largest publishers in TV and film, including commercials. Hunte went on to produce an album and several tracks for the company.

Missy Elliott also personally called Hunte to request some backing tracks for her artists after hearing his work with singer Chantal Brown (Do Me Bad Things, Atlantic).

In 2007, Hunte became a platinum songwriter due to his co-written track "I Was Born" on Natalia Druyts' Sony BMG release Everything and More which stayed at number 1 on the Belgian charts for five weeks. His tracks have also featured in American Pie Presents: Beta House and Paula Abdul's Hey Paula ("Get Them Hands Hi" track by his group Ten Days Till).

Many of the artists that Hunte has produced, written for, remixed or mixed have also seen a level of success. Leona Lewis became a global star after winning The X Factor's 2006 competition, Leon Jean-Marie signed to Island Records, and Tendai Tyson found his creative and commercial home in the group Unkle Jam (Virgin).

Hunte has also placed two tracks in major international games alongside platinum artists Akon, Gnarls Barkley, The Black Eyed Peas, Lupe Fiasco and Dipset: "Crook Dancin'" by Slic One in Fight Night Round 3 and "Get Them Hands Hi" in EA Sports NBA Live.

"Get Them Hands Hi" featured vocals by singer Lifford who found fame through the Artful Dodger's "Please Don't Turn Me On". Other shows to feature Hunte's tracks include MTV's Pimp My Ride, Next, Makin' The Band, Yo Momma and Run's House, Date My Mom, Punk'd among many other shows. Films have included American Pie Presents: Beta House, Dirty Pretty Things (Makin of A Million), Farce of the Penguins (Slic One – "From the Start") with Samuel L. Jackson and in 2007 Ping Pong Playa (Slic One – "Wake Up Call").

Ten Days Till, the band featuring Lifford placed tracks in American Pie 6 Beta House, EA Sports NBA Live 07 and Paula Abdul's Hey Paula and sold several thousand copies of their independently released "Get Them Hands Hi".
