= The Light at the End of the World (A Flock of Seagulls album) =

Studio album by A Flock of Seagulls
- Released: 14 March 1995
- Recorded: 1994
- Genre: New wave, synth-pop
- Length: 58:46
- Label: Big Shot
- Producer: Mike Score

A Flock of Seagulls chronology
| Dream Come True (1986) | The Light at the End of the World (1995) | Ascension (2018) |

Singles from The Light at the End of the World
- 1. "Magic" Released: 1989; 2. "Burnin' Up" Released: 1995; 3. "Rainfall" Released: 14 May 1996

Professional ratings
Review scores
| Source | Rating |
|---|---|
| Allmusic | 1.5/5 stars |
| The Encyclopedia of Popular Music | 2/4 stars |

The Light at the End of the World is the fifth studio album by A Flock of Seagulls, released by Big Shot Records in 1995. It was the band's first album since 1986's Dream Come True and was released in the US only.

== Background ==
Left as the band's only original member, Mike Score worked with many different musicians over the years. He and the members of his band mostly played live shows, but returned with new material with the release of the single "Magic" in 1989. The band returned to the recording studio in 1994 to begin working on new material, by which time the line-up was made up of Score, Ed Berner on guitar, Dean Pichette on bass and A.J. Mazzetti on drums.

While rehearsing the finishing touches for the album, the band came across David Brodie, the vice-president of the fledgling record company Big Shot. Located in Winter Park, Florida, the label was close to the band's home-base and seemed a more viable choice compared to a label further away. Score told the Orlando Sentinel: "It happened naturally. They were starting the company, and I was finishing my album."

== Release ==
The album was released in March 1995 and an album release party was held at Jani Lane's Sunset Strip in Orlando on 26 March. Speaking to The Greenville News in 1995, Score said of The Light at the End of the World: "It's become my favorite album - partly because it's new and partly because I think the songwriting has matured. We really put it out for our hardcore fans."

== Music ==
In contrast to the first two albums from A Flock of Seagulls, but keeping a similar theme to the previous Dream Come True, the songs featured on this album were mainly romantic in theme. Some of the songs, including "Burnin' Up", "Magic" and "Setting Sun", were already being performed live as far back as the late 1980s. The album produced three singles – "Magic", "Burnin' Up" and "Rainfall" – which all had no chart success (although "Rainfall" would appear on many compilations for the band). The album also features two new age instrumentals: "The Light at the End of the World" and "Seven Seas".

Score recalled of the album to Classic Pop in 2019: "A lot of people had been pressuring me to make an album, and I wasn't at my best at that point. I wasn't fully confident, and I made a record so I could clear the decks a bit. It's not the best record, but there are a few good songs on it."

== Artwork ==
The album's artwork was done by Rifka, who also did the artwork for the single "Burnin' Up". It depicts a seaside landscape with gulls and an abstract figure in the upper-right corner.

== Reception ==
Stephen Thomas Erlewine of AllMusic called the album "dull, tedious and embarrassing to listen to". He added: "A Flock Of Seagulls don't write one memorable hook on the entire album and the sound is too polished, too produced, which means it doesn't have a chance of recapturing the glitzy, synthesized spark of new wave." Larry Flick of Billboard reviewed "Burnin' Up" and wrote: "[The] band returns with a synth-pop ditty that could have been pulled from one of its old albums. Given how retro sounds are all the rage, this is not necessarily a detriment to the single's chances - especially since it has a chorus with legs to carry it."

== Track listing ==
All tracks are written by A Flock of Seagulls

| No. | Title | Length |
|---|---|---|
| 1. | "Burnin' Up" | 5:05 |
| 2. | "Magic" | 5:13 |
| 3. | "Setting Sun" | 6:15 |
| 4. | "Rainfall" | 5:02 |
| 5. | "Ordinary Man" | 4:58 |
| 6. | "You're Mine" | 5:12 |
| 7. | "Walking in the Garden" | 5:02 |
| 8. | "Hearts on Fire" | 4:33 |
| 9. | "Life is Easy" | 5:01 |
| 10. | "Say You Love Me" | 5:09 |
| 11. | "The Light at the End of the World" | 5:21 |
| 12. | "Seven Seas" | 1:47 |
| Total length: | | 58:45 |

== Personnel ==
A Flock of Seagulls

- Mike Score – vocals, keyboards
- Ed Berner – guitars
- Dean Pichette – bass guitar
- A.J. Mazzetti – drums

Additional Personnel

- Andy de Ganahl – engineering, mixing
- Joe Smith – engineering, mixing (1,5,8)
- Joe Smith and Brett Stuart – engineering, mixing (11,12)
- Brett Stuart – programming
- George Marino – mastering
- Rifka – cover illustration
- Klaus Heesch – layout, design
