= A Flock of Seagulls =

English new wave and synth-pop band

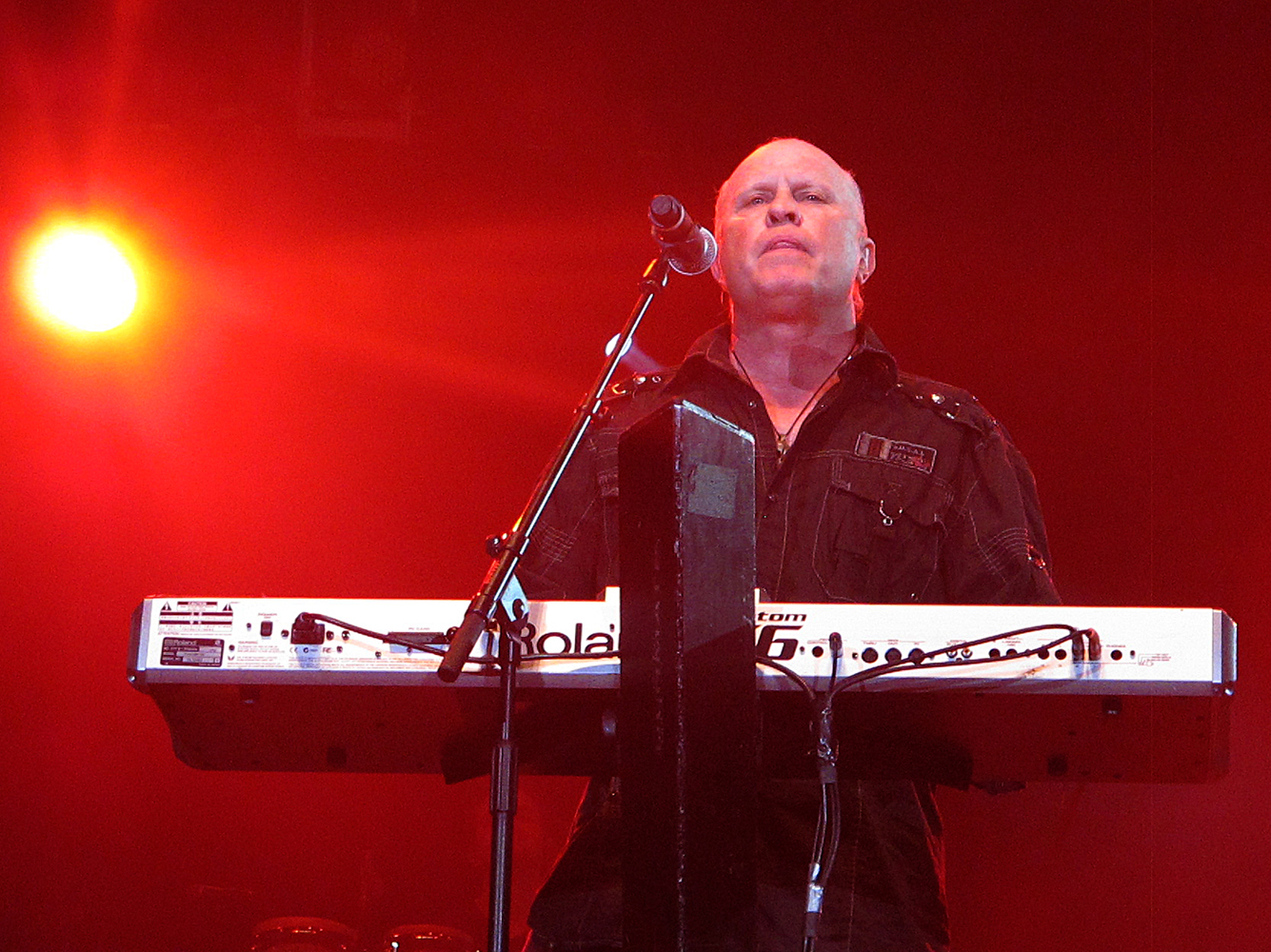
- Lead singer Mike Score performing in 2011

Background information
- Origin: Liverpool, England
- Genres: New wave; synth-pop; electronic rock
- Works: A Flock of Seagulls discography
- Years active: 1979–1986; 1988–present
- Labels: Arista; Jive; I.R.S.
- Members: Mike Score; Pando; Kevin Rankin; Gordon Deppe
- Past members: Paul Reynolds; Frank Maudsley; Ali Score; (see Band members for others)
- Website: aflockofseagulls.org

A Flock of Seagulls are an English new wave band formed in Liverpool in 1979. The group, whose best-known line-up comprised Mike Score, Ali Score, Frank Maudsley and Paul Reynolds, hit the peak of their chart success in the early 1980s.

The group had a string of international hit singles including "I Ran (So Far Away)" (1982), "Space Age Love Song" (1982), "Wishing (If I Had a Photograph of You)" (1982), and "The More You Live, the More You Love" (1984). Their video for "I Ran (So Far Away)" received airplay on MTV during the Second British Invasion. The band won a Grammy Award in 1983 for their instrumental "D.N.A." (1982).

In 2018, the members of the original lineup assembled to record the album Ascension with the Prague Philharmonic Orchestra. In 2021, the original lineup again reunited temporarily to record another album with the Prague Philharmonic Orchestra, String Theory.

== History ==
=== 1979–1982: Formation and debut album ===
The band A Flock of Seagulls was formed in Liverpool, in 1979 by Mike Score, Frank Maudsley and Ali Score. Mike was a hairdresser when he bought a second-hand Korg MS-10 synthesizer and invited his friends to form the band. Frank played bass and Ali drums, even without prior experience. After testing six guitarists, Willie Woo joined the band and brought in Mark Edmondson to replace Ali on drums. Later, the Score brothers had a falling out, and Mark Edmondson left. Ali returned to the band and shortly afterwards Woo left, being replaced by Paul Reynolds, a 17-year-old friend of Mark Edmondson. Initially, the band did not have a vocalist. Mike, who was the composer of the songs, sang just to show how he thought the song should sound. However, Maudsley suggested that he be the band's official lead singer. Mike was reluctant at first, but ended up accepting the suggestion.

In an interview with Worcester Magazine in 2017, Mike Score explains where the band name comes from:

my favorite band was The Stranglers. One of their songs was called "Toiler on the Sea." We were at one of their concerts (The singer) yells out, "a flock of seagulls." We were in the front row. He looked like he looked right at us and called out, “a flock of seagulls.” We took it as a sign. Originally, we were called Level 7, but Level 42 has just put their album out. We knew we were going to have to change our name … Strangely enough, from that moment on, everybody noticed us. Everyone was like, 'Wow, what a strange name.' I think the name made people want to hear what we were about.

The band began playing local clubs and eventually got a record deal with Jive Records. In 1981, they released their first single, "Talking", which was produced by Bill Nelson. The single was a moderate success in the United Kingdom. In 1982, the band released their second single, "Telecommunication", which was also produced by Bill Nelson. The single was an even bigger success than the first and became a club hit. The band's third release was the EP Modern Love is Automatic. Released in the US, it included the single "Telecommunication" as well as "I Ran (So Far Away)" — which became the band's biggest hit and was in heavy rotation on the new cable channel, MTV. The video for "I Ran" was low budget (even for the time), but it provided enormous exposure for the band, and it is well-remembered in part because MTV played it frequently.

The band's debut album, A Flock of Seagulls, was released in 1982. The album was a commercial and critical success, reaching number 1 in Australia and the Top 10 in the US and New Zealand. The album was praised for its new wave songs, which were influenced by styles such as synthpop, post-punk and new romantic. The band was also noted for their image, which was characterized by slicked-back hair and colorful clothing.

=== 1983: Listen and the peak of popularity ===
In late 1982, A Flock of Seagulls finally achieved commercial success in their home country with the single "Wishing (If I Had a Photograph of You)", which reached the top 10 in the UK Singles Chart. The song was inspired by a short romance which vocalist Mike Score had with a woman on tour in the United States. The woman had a Polaroid camera, and Score asked her to take a picture with it. She said if he had the photo, he would leave and the romance would be forgotten. They broke up soon after, and Score wrote the song about how he wished he had a photo of her to remember her by.

The band began 1983 at the Palladium in Manhattan playing the MTV New Year's Eve Rock n' Roll Ball with "Space Age Love Song" still climbing the charts in the U.S. following the top ten success of "I Ran". Listen, the follow-up to band's debut album, was released at the end of April 1983 and also received positive reviews. AllMusic critic Tom Demalon praises the single "Wishing (If I Had a Photograph of You)" as "multilayered and hypnotic" and also has written favorably about the songs "Nightmares" and "Transfer Affection".

The band continued to enjoy commercial and critical success in 1983. They performed at the US Festival (in San Bernardino, California) in May and at Holleder Memorial Stadium (in Rochester, New York) in July. They also began touring with the band The Police. Three more singles were released for Listen in 1983, but they were only moderately successful. The band began to lose popularity in the late 1980s, but they continue to perform and record.

=== 1984: The Story of a Young Heart and Reynolds' departure ===
After the commercial success of their debut album, A Flock of Seagulls decided to change direction with their third album, The Story of a Young Heart. The band ventured into a new style, wanting to make a concept album based on themes like suicide and heartbreak. The album was produced by Steve Lovell and featured more accentuated guitars and a more polished sound. The song's lyrics were written by Mike Score, who had lost a close friend to suicide. The song "Remember David" was written in honour of his deceased friend.

Despite the band's efforts, The Story of a Young Heart was not as commercially successful as their debut album. The single "The More You Live, The More You Love" reached the top 40 on the US and UK charts, but "Never Again (The Dancer)" and "Remember David" was not as popular and had moderate success. During the album's tour, the band's guitarist Paul Reynolds became involved with drug abuse. His drug problems worsened, resulting in his exit from the band mid-tour. The tour ended early. The band was without a guitarist. Reynolds' departure was a blow to A Flock of Seagulls. The band never again managed to achieve the same success as their early years.

=== 1985–1986: New lineup, Dream Come True and hiatus ===
After Paul Reynolds' departure, A Flock of Seagulls underwent a revamp. Gary Steadman, former Classix Nouveaux guitarist, was hired to replace Reynolds. Chris Chryssaphis, keyboardist, also joined the band. With the new lineup, the band recorded their fourth album, Dream Come True. The album was released in 1985 in the UK and in 1986 in the US.

Dream Come True was a commercial failure. Reviews were negative, with some critics calling the songs "lifeless" and "ineffective". The band dissolved in 1986 after the album's failure.

=== 1988–1998: Various formations and The Light at the End of the World ===
In 1988, Mike Score formed a new band with local Philadelphia musicians. This lineup released the single "Magic" in 1989.

In 1994, Score formed a new band with Ed Berner, A.J. Mazzetti and Dean Pichette. This lineup recorded the album The Light at the End of the World, released only in the US in 1995. The album was a commercial and critical failure. Critics called it "tedious" and "embarrassing", while fans claimed it was "misinterpreted". Score said the album was an unsuccessful attempt to bring the band into the grunge era, which dominated popular music at the time.

=== 1998–2018: Touring and Ascension years ===
In 1998, Mike Score formed a new band with Joe Rodriguez, Darryl Sons and Rob Wright. The band re-recorded Madonna's song "This Used to Be My Playground" in 1999 for Madonna's 2000 tribute album, The World's Greatest 80s Tribute.

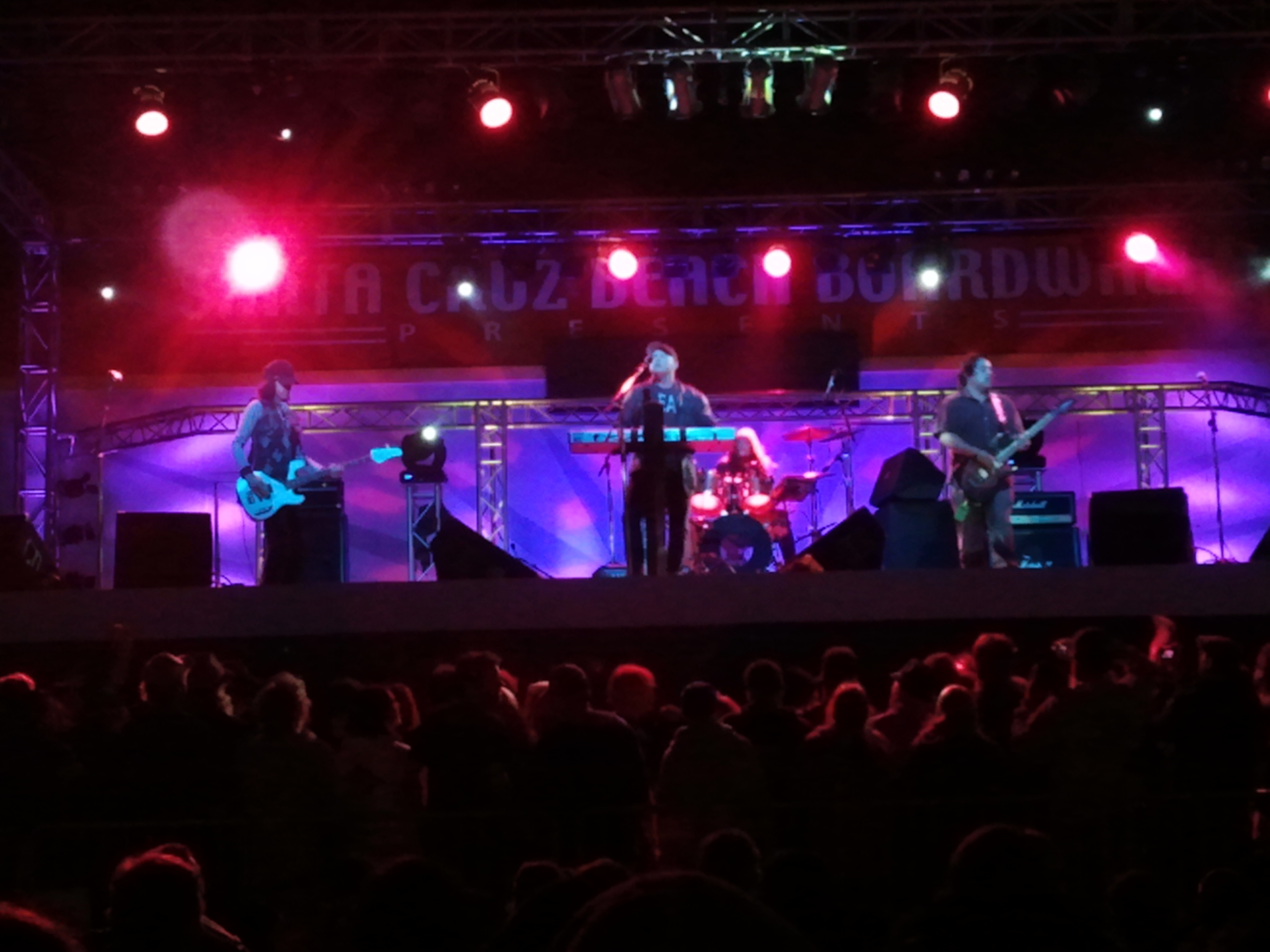
A Flock Of Seagulls live, 2012.

In November 2003, the band's original lineup reunited for a one-off performance on the VH1 series Bands Reunited. In September 2004, they reformed again and went on a brief tour of the United States. In 2013, Mike Score launched a solo career. He released the singles "All I Wanna Do" and "Somebody Like You".

In 2016, Kevin Rankin replaced Michael Brahm on drums. In December 2017, Gordon Deppe (from the Canadian band Spoons replaced Joe Rodriguez. In 2018, the band's four original members reunited to record a new album, Ascension. The album was released in July 2018 and received positive reviews. Since the album's release, Mike Score expressed a desire to reunite the original lineup for a tour.

=== 2019–present: Inflight and String Theory ===
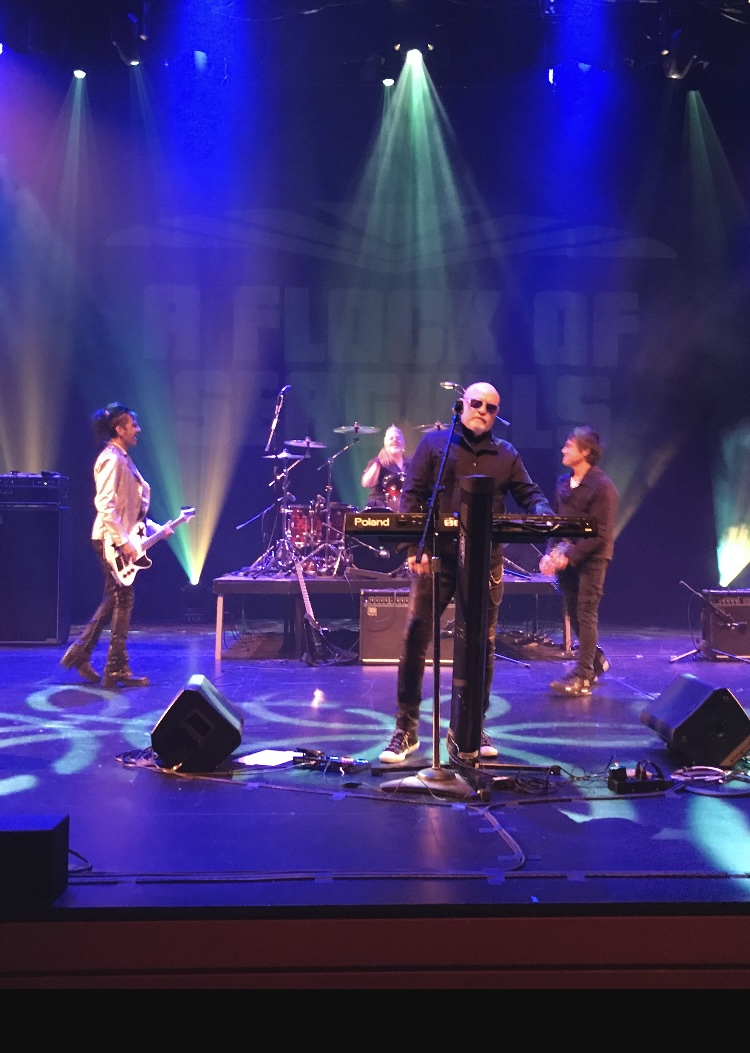
A Flock of Seagulls performing at Harbison Theatre in Irmo, South Carolina in 2024

In 2019, the original members of A Flock of Seagulls reunited to record a new album, Inflight (The Extended Essentials). The album was released on 12 July 2019 and featured extended versions of some of the band's biggest hits, such as "I Ran (So Far Away)", "Space Age Love Song" and "Wishing (If I Had a Photograph of You)". Also in the same year, Mike Score revealed in an interview with Classic Pop magazine that he was working on a new solo album, Space Boy. However, the album has not been released.

In 2021, the band announced that they would release a new orchestral album, String Theory. Scheduled for release on 20 August 2021, the album featured orchestral versions of some of the band's hits, such as "Messages", "Remember David" and "Say You Love Me". The album's first single, "Say You Love Me", was released on 23 July 2021. The single was released in seven different versions and featured a music video released on YouTube. On 9 August 2024, the band announced the release of their sixth studio, Sweet Dreams, their first album of new material in 29 years. It was released on 13 December 2024.

Since 2017, with the exception of the reunion of the original members, the band's lineup has featured Mike Score on vocals, Pando on bass, Gordon Deppe on guitar and Kevin Rankin on drums.

== Legacy ==
Owing to their memorable and unusual style and appearance, A Flock of Seagulls are sometimes referred to with ironic appreciation. In the 1994 film Pulp Fiction, a character played by Samuel L. Jackson refers to Burr Steers's character as "flock of seagulls" due to the latter's hairstyle.

The New Musical Express wrote: "Of course, everyone remembers this group now for singer Mike Score's ridiculous back-combed haircut and the fact that they are mentioned in Pulp Fiction. So now they're kind of cool, but in the early 1980s it was a different story."

The band was featured on Viacom's VH1 and Sony's BMG Legacy Recordings' 2006 revival CD series and multi-platform marketing campaign, "We Are the '80s". In a 2007 article for The Guardian, Alfred Hickling described the group as "dreadful", and unfavourably compared them to new wave peers OMD and other Liverpool acts of the time. The band is also noted for their debut album, a concept album which alludes to an alien invasion of earth. Billboard writer Robert Christgau applauded their "mechanical lyrics, about a mechanical end of the world," while noting the "aural pleasure" of both the band's debut album and the follow-up.

== Band members ==
Current members

- Mike Score – lead vocals, keyboards (1979–1986, 1988–present)
- Pando – bass, backing vocals (2004–present)
- Kevin Rankin – drums (2016–present)
- Gord Deppe – guitars, backing vocals (2017–present)

Former members

- Frank Maudsley – bass, backing vocals (1979–1986, 2003, 2004, 2018, 2021)
- Ali Score – drums (1979–1986, 2003, 2004, 2018, 2021)
- Paul Reynolds – guitars, backing vocals (1980–1984, 2003, 2004, 2018, 2021)
- Willie Woo – guitars (1980)
- Mark Edmondson – drums (1980)
- Chris Mars Chryssaphes – keyboards (1984–1985)
- Gary Steadman – guitars (1984–1985)
- Ed Berner – guitars (1988–1998)
- Dave Maerz – guitars (1988–1989)
- Kaya Pryor – drums, percussion (1988–1994)
- Mike Radcliffe – bass (1988–1994)
- Mike Railton – keyboards (1988–1994)
- Jonte Wilkins – drums (1988–1989)
- Mike Marquart – drums (1989)
- Shavin Duffy – bass (1990)
- Mel Morley – keyboards (1990–1992)
- A.J. Mazzetti – drums (1994–1998)
- Julio Alvarez – keyboards (1992–1994)
- Dean Pichette – bass (1994–1998)
- Joe Rodriguez – guitars (1998–2017)
- Lucio Rubino – bass (1998–2002)
- John Walker – drums (1995–1998)
- Darryl Sons – drums (1998–2004)
- Rob Wright – bass (1998–2004)
- Robbie Hanson – bass (1999–2006)
- Albert Cruz – drums (2001–2006)
- Michael Brahm – drums (2004–2016)

=== Line-ups ===
1979	1980	1980	1980
Mike Score – lead vocals, keyboards; Frank Maudsley – bass; Ali Score – drums	Mike Score – lead vocals, keyboards; Frank Maudsley – bass; Ali Score – drums; Willie Woo – lead	Mike Score – lead vocals, keyboards; Frank Maudsley – bass; Willie Woo – guitars; Mark Edmondson – drums	Mike Score – lead vocals, keyboards; Frank Maudsley – bass; Willie Woo – guitars; Ali Score – drums
1980–84 (Reunions: 2003, 2004, 2018, 2021)	1984–85	1985–86	1986–88
Mike Score – lead vocals, keyboards; Frank Maudsley – bass; Ali Score – drums; Paul Reynolds – guitars	Mike Score – lead vocals, keyboards; Frank Maudsley – bass; Ali Score – drums; Chris Mars Chryssaphes – keyboards; Gary Steadman – guitars	Mike Score – lead vocals, keyboards; Frank Maudsley – bass; Ali Score – drums	Disbanded
1988–89	1989	1989–94	1994–98
Mike Score – lead vocals, keyboards; Ed Berner – guitars; Dave Maerz – guitars; Kaya Pryor – drums, percussion; Mike Radcliffe – bass; Mike Railton – keyboards; Jonte Wilkins – drums	Mike Score – lead vocals, keyboards; Ed Berner – guitars; Dave Maerz – guitars; Kaya Pryor – drums, percussion; Mike Radcliffe – bass; Mike Railton – keyboards; Jonte Wilkins – drums; Mike Marquart – drums	Mike Score – lead vocals, keyboards; Ed Berner – guitars; Kaya Pryor – drums, percussion; Mike Radcliffe – bass; Shavin Duffy – bass (1990); Mike Railton – keyboards	Mike Score – lead vocals, keyboards; Ed Berner – guitars; A.J. Mazzetti – drums; John Walker – drums (1995-1998); Dean Pichette – bass
1998–2004	2004–2016	2016–2017	2017–present
Mike Score – lead vocals, keyboards; Joe Rodriguez – guitars; Darryl Sons – drums; Albert Cruz – drums; Lucio Rubino – bass (till 2002); Rob Wright – bass; Robbie Hanson – bass	Mike Score – lead vocals, keyboards; Joe Rodriguez – guitars; Michael Brahm – drums; Albert Cruz – drums (till 2006); Pando – bass, backing vocals; Robbie Hanson – bass (till 2006)	Mike Score – lead vocals, keyboards; Joe Rodriguez – guitars; Pando – bass, backing vocals; Kevin Rankin – drums	Mike Score – lead vocals, keyboards; Pando – bass, backing vocals; Kevin Rankin – drums; Gord Deppe – guitars, backing vocals

== Discography ==
=== Studio albums ===
- A Flock of Seagulls (1982)
- Listen (1983)
- The Story of a Young Heart (1984)
- Dream Come True (1986)
- The Light at the End of the World (1995)
- Some Dreams (2024)

=== Orchestral albums ===
- Ascension (2018)
- String Theory (2021)

== See also ==
- List of bands named after other performers' songs
- List of new wave artists
- List of Peel sessions
- List of synth-pop artists
