= Mike Score =

English singer-songwriter (born 1957)

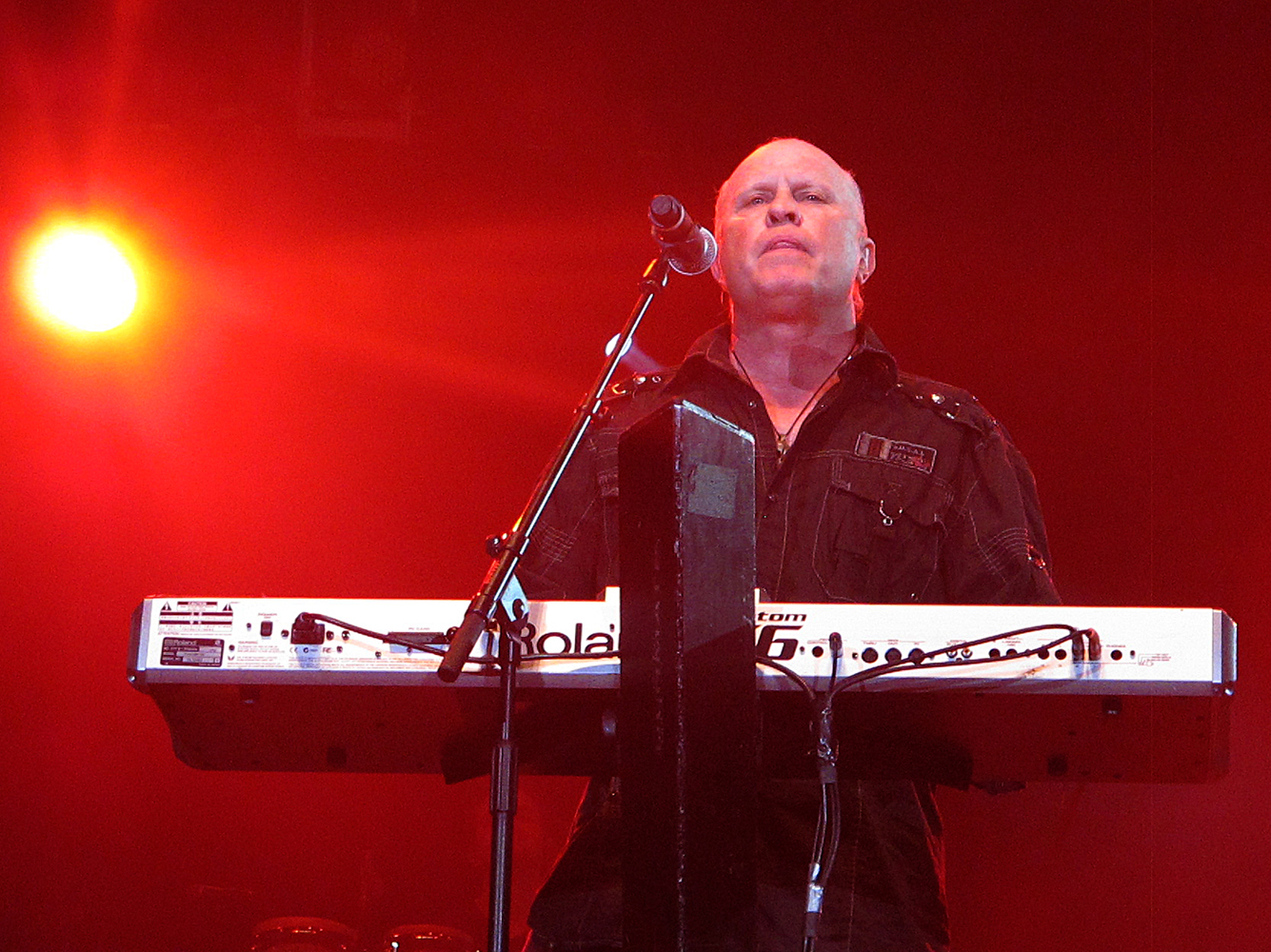
- Score performing with A Flock of Seagulls in Liverpool, in 2011

Background information
- Born: Michael Gordon Score; 5 November 1957 (age 69); Beverley, East Riding of Yorkshire, England
- Genres: New wave; post-punk; synth-pop
- Occupations: Singer; songwriter; musician
- Instruments: Vocals; guitar; keyboards
- Years active: 1976–present
- Member of: A Flock of Seagulls
- Formerly of: Tontrix
- Website: mikescore.com

Michael Gordon Score (born 5 November 1957) is an English singer, songwriter and musician who achieved fame as the founder, lead vocalist, and keyboardist of the new wave band A Flock of Seagulls. He released a solo album on 1 March 2014 titled Zeebratta.

A Flock of Seagulls were an influential band of the 1980s, still shaping much of today's dance music, contemporary pop and electronic music.

== Life and career ==
Score was born in Beverley, East Riding of Yorkshire, on 5 November 1957. Score was a hairdresser in Liverpool until 1978 when he formed the post-punk band Tontrix, in which he played bass, along with Hambi Haralambous (vocals), Steve Lovell (guitar), Bobby Carr (keyboards) and Chris Hughes (drums).

The band released just one 7-inch 45 with two songs, "Shell Shocked" and "Slipping into Life". The band played many shows in the North West of England but, in late 1979, the group was disbanded, with the members following different paths.

A few months later, in the same year, he founded the new wave band A Flock of Seagulls with his brother Ali Score (drums), his friend Frank Maudsley (bass), and Paul Reynolds (guitar). Mike played keyboard and guitar, and was a vocalist. A Flock of Seagulls started playing in pubs and practised on top of the hall where Mike worked, until they got a contract with a record label. Soon after that, their debut self-titled album, A Flock of Seagulls, was released in 1982, and achieved international success. In 1983, they released the album Listen, which was quite successful. In the same year, the band started doing shows together with the Police and the Fixx. In 1984, they released The Story of a Young Heart, which was moderately successful. In 1986, the album Dream Come True was met with mixed reviews, after which the band broke up.

When Score decided to reform the band again in 1988, the other members refused to join him. He performed and toured as A Flock of Seagulls with different members. In 1995, he released the album The Light at the End of the World, which did not perform very well commercially.

In 1999, Score recorded a song for the compilation album Trackspotting V, titled "All I Wanna Do". It is the eighth track (out of 18) on the album, and he is credited as "Scorey".

In 2003, the original members of A Flock of Seagulls were brought together by VH1's Bands Reunited. They played their hit "I Ran (So Far Away)" in a unique performance in London. In an interview before the performance, it was revealed that his "seagull" or "wings" hairstyle was created when the actor tried to style his hair as David Bowie's character, Ziggy Stardust. Bassist Frank Maudsley was trying to use the mirror at the same time, and put his hand on Score's head, leaving only the hair on the sides of the head up. The band's reunion apparently resolved the tension between him and his brother, Ali Score, the band's former drummer, who has been around since the end of the band.

On 4 February 2013, Score indicated, through his YouTube account, that he had started a solo career. On the same day, Score released a video clip of another version of the 1999 song "All I Wanna Do". It was released as a single on 18 February 2013, on Right Track Records. The genre of the track is ambient electronica. Score planned to release a solo album soon after, but in July 2013, the van used by Score and his musicians was stolen from a Comfort Inn in Downey, California, US. The van contained Score's equipment, clothing, and hard drives containing the album tracks. The next day, the van was found with nothing inside. The hard drives containing the audio files have never been recovered.

In January 2014, Score released his second single entitled "Somebody Like You". On 1 March 2014, Score released Zeebratta, his first studio album.

On 3 May 2018, it was announced that the original four members of the band would meet again to record a new album entitled Ascension, their first studio recording since 1984. Featuring the Prague Philharmonic Orchestra, it would be a 10-track album composed of exclusive songs, versions of previous hits, and a new song. The video for "Space Age Love Song" debuted on YouTube on 6 June, and a five-track EP featuring five versions of the song was released digitally two days later.

On 12 July 2019, the original members got together again for another album, Inflight (The Extended Essentials). This time, the band reworked their original hits and extended them in an 80s 12" remix style. Ten new recordings, expanded to fill the imagination of dreamers around the world, are now available in physical and digital stores.

== Style ==
Mike brought the band a unique New Romantic style, infusing futuristic footprints through synthesizers, vocal tones and science-fiction costumes to create their trademark image. Mike was known for his signature back combed haircut which resembled a 'waterfall'. In an interview for Classic Pop, Mike was quoted as saying "My mum used to say, 'Don't copy people, try to be yourself because then people will remember you". He went onto to say "There was a little bit of David Bowie and Alice Cooper in the band's appearance, without copying them". It was reported that the 'Winged' haircut originated when the band was due to do a show in Trinidad. Whilst in the dressing room before the performance, Mike was combing his hair back when Frank Maudsley hurriedly pushed him away from the mirror only for his hair to fall forward at the front and stay up at the sides.

== Equipment ==
=== Guitars ===
Mike Score has large guitar collections that he has used over the years, each used to play a different song, among them we can highlight his red Yamaha SG1000 that he used a lot for songs like Man Made and Pick Me Up, another The guitar used a lot by Score was the Gibson Moderne Electric Guitar which was used a lot by Mike at the beginning of the band, he used this guitar to play songs like Telecommunication and others. Other guitars also used by Mike were guitars like a blue Aria Pro II ZZ Deluxe, which was known for being used at the US Festival in 1983, Mike used this guitar to perform several songs and was one of the most used by Score in the 1980s, another one that Mike used a lot after 1984 was a black Fender Telecaster. He currently uses a black Fender Made in Japan Modern Telecaster HH.

=== Synthesizers ===
Score became famous for his riffs with the synthesizer, creating unique sounds, which brought a great mark to his style of composition. Among the various synthesizers in its collection we can highlight the Korg Delta, Korg MS-10, Roland Jupiter-8 Synthesizer, Roland Juno-60, Roland SH-101 Synthesizer, Ensoniq TS-10, Roland SH-09 Synthesizer, Roland Fantom-X6 and among others that have been used throughout the extensive musical career that Mike Score has carried since the late 1970s.

== Personal life ==
Mike Score lives in Florida with his wife, both of whom travel regularly between the US and Liverpool with their boats. Score has been married four times and has been married to Ceena Score since 2012. Score has a child from his first marriage.

== Discography ==
Solo

- Zeebratta (2014)

Collaborations

- Looking for You (with Isaac Junkie) (2018)

A Flock of Seagulls

- A Flock of Seagulls (1982)
- Listen (1983)
- The Story of a Young Heart (1984)
- Dream Come True (1986)
- The Light at the End of the World (1995)
- Ascension (2018)
- String Theory (2021)
- Some Dreams (2024)
Tontrix
- Shell Shocked and Slipping into Life (1979)
