= Counter Culture (album) =

Compilation album by Roy Harper
- Released: 2005
- Recorded: Ireland
- Genre: Folk / Rock
- Length: Disc.1 76:17 Disc.2 73:38
- Label: Science Friction HUCD039
- Producer: Roy Harper

Roy Harper chronology
Today Is Yesterday (2002)	Counter Culture (2005)	From Occident to Orient (2007)

Professional ratings
Review scores
Source	Rating

Counter Culture is a 2005 compilation double album by English folk/rock singer-songwriter Roy Harper featuring 25 classic Roy Harper songs, cherry picked according to his mood in April 2005. This collection spans 35 years of song writing and is intended as an introduction for anyone who's not sure where to start with Harper's music. This compilation features a number of guest musicians, including; Jimmy Page, Bill Bruford, Ronnie Lane, David Gilmour, Kate Bush and Nick Harper.

== Track listing ==
All tracks credited to Roy Harper

=== Disc One ===
1. "Sophisticated Beggar" – 5:05 (from Sophisticated Beggar)
2. "You Don't Need Money" – 2:25 (from Come Out Fighting Ghengis Smith)
3. "Francesca" – 1:20 (from Flat Baroque and Berserk)
4. "I Hate The White Man" – 8:02 (from Flat Baroque and Berserk)
5. "Another Day" – 4:01 (from Flashes from the Archives of Oblivion)
6. "The Same Old Rock" – 12:24 (from Stormcock)
7. "Me And My Woman" – 13:01 (from Stormcock)
8. "South Africa" – 4:06 (from Lifemask)
9. "I'll See You Again" – 4:58 (from Valentine)
10. "Twelve Hours Of Sunset" – 4:49 (from Valentine)
11. "Forget Me Not" – 2:24 (from HQ)
12. "Hallucinating Light" – 6:23 (from HQ)
13. "When An Old Cricketer Leaves The Crease" – 7:13 (from HQ)

=== Disc Two ===
1. "One Of Those Days In England (Parts 2–10)" – 19:13 (from Bullinamingvase)
2. "These Last Days" – 4:26 (from Bullinamingvase)
3. "Cherishing The Lonesome" – 5:57 (from Bullinamingvase)
4. "The Flycatcher" – 4:08 (from The Unknown Soldier)
5. "You" – 4:37 (from The Unknown Soldier)
6. "Frozen Moment" – 3:16 (from Whatever Happened to Jugula?)
7. "Pinches Of Salt" – 3:06 (from Descendants of Smith)
8. "Miles Remains" – 8:52 (from Death or Glory?)
9. "Evening Star" – 6:04 (from Death or Glory?)
10. "I Want To Be In Love" – 5:59 (from The Dream Society)
11. "The Green Man" – 5:31 (from The Green Man)
12. "Blackpool" (Edit) – 2:25 (from Sophisticated Beggar)

== Personnel ==
- Roy Harper
- Noel Barrett
- David Bedford
- Bill Bruford
- Kate Bush
- Stuart Elliot
- Tony Franklin
- David Gilmour
- Nik Green
- The Grimethorpe Colliery Band
- John Halsey
- Nick Harper
- Ronnie Lane
- Alvin Lee
- Cara Mastrey
- Jimmy McCullough
- Henry McCullough
- Jimmy Page
- John Renbourn
- Andy Roberts
- Ric Sanders
- Chris Spedding
- Pete Wingfield
