= An Introduction to Roy Harper =

An Introduction to .....

Compilation album by Roy Harper
- Released: 1994
- Recorded: Ireland / England
- Genres: Folk, rock
- Length: 72:04
- Label: Science Friction HUCD017
- Producer: Roy Harper

Roy Harper chronology
Harper 1970-1975 (1978)	An Introduction to ..... (1994)	Song Of The Ages (1997)

Professional ratings
Review scores
Source	Rating
Allmusic	link

An Introduction to ..... is a 1994 compilation album by Roy Harper.

== History ==
The album features 13 Harper songs from a 25-year period and is "...a collection of various styles and periods...purely intended for people who may not know where to start [with Harper's music]." Roy Harper.

== Track listing ==
All tracks credited to Roy Harper

1. "Legend" – 3:46 (from Sophisticated Beggar)
2. "She's The One" – 6:57 (from Folkjokeopus)
3. "Tom Tiddler's Ground" – 6:50 (from Flat Baroque and Berserk)
4. "Highway Blues" – 6:34 (from Lifemask)
5. "Che" – 3:05 (from Valentine)
6. "Hallucinating Light" – 6:24 (from HQ)
7. "One Of Those Days In England" – 3:27 (from Bullinamingvase)
8. "You" – 4:35 (from The Unknown Soldier)
9. "Nineteen Forty-Eightish" – 9:35 (from Whatever Happened to Jugula?)
10. "Pinches Of Salt" – 3:08 (from Descendants of Smith)
11. "Ghost Dance" – 3:53 (from Once)
12. "The Tallest Tree" – 4:55 (from Death or Glory?)
13. "Miles Remains" – 8:52 (from Death or Glory?)

== Personnel ==
- Roy Harper – guitar and vocals
- Jimmy Page – guitar
- Kate Bush – vocals
- Colin Curwood – photography
