= From Occident to Orient =

Compilation album by Roy Harper
- Released: 2007
- Recorded: England
- Genre: Folk, rock
- Label: Vinyl Japan JASKCD186
- Producer: Roy Harper

Roy Harper chronology
Counter Culture (2005)	From Occident to Orient (2007)	Songs Of Love And Loss (2011)

Professional ratings
Review scores
Source	Rating

From Occident to Orient is a 2007 compilation by English folk/rock singer-songwriter Roy Harper. It was initially released as a collector's item by Vinyl Japan to coincide with Harper's 2007 tour there.

== Track listing ==
All tracks credited to Roy Harper

1. "Blackpool" – 5:09 (from Sophisticated Beggar)
2. "Francesca" – 1:21 (from Flat Baroque and Berserk)
3. "Another Day" – 4:01 (from Flashes from the Archives of Oblivion)
4. "Miles Remains" – 9:15 (from Beyond the Door)
5. "Wishing Well" – 5:53 (from The Green Man)
6. "Frozen Moment" – 3:17 (from Whatever Happened to Jugula?)
7. "How Does It Feel" – 6:13 (from Beyond the Door)
8. "Pinches Of Salt" – 3:06 (from Garden of Uranium)
9. "Elizabeth" – 6:38 (from Whatever Happened to Jugula?)
10. "Rushing Camelot" – 8:47 (from The Green Man)
11. "The Green Man" – 5:31 (from The Green Man)
12. "One Of Those Days In England" – 19:13 (from Bullinamingvase)

== Personnel ==
- Roy Harper
- Danny Clifford – cover photography
