= Three Hundred Words =

- by Roy Harper
- First published in: Born in Captivity II
- Country: UK
- Language: English
- Subject(s): Cricket
- Genre(s): Cricket poetry
- Publisher: Science Friction
- Publication date: 1992
- Media type: Compact Cassette

"Three Hundred Words" is a poem that showcases a number of Roy Harper's literary techniques and characteristics.

According to Harper's spoken introduction on his 1992 Live album, Born in Captivity II, (re-released in 1993 as Unhinged) "Three Hundred Words" was written for a benefit concert for Lancashire batsman, Graeme Fowler. It not only concerns one of Harper's most oft-cited loves, cricket (see "When An Old Cricketer Leaves The Crease", on the album HQ), it also picks up the themes of England, combining historical reminiscences with current events, using minor observations to make major (political) statements, breaking rhymes across lines, and using clever mixed metaphors. It is, therefore, quintessentially Harper.

I remember Pat Tetley,
and romping in grass
- that was tall -
at the back of the cricket field,
trying to catch glimpses
of knickers and ass,
whilst over the fence
the crowd yelled, ooh-ed and roared,
as Ramadhin, Weekes and Frank Worrell all scored...

(partial)
