= Born in Captivity II =

Live album by Roy Harper
- Released: 1992
- Recorded: England
- Genre: Rock
- Label: Hard Up 2, Hard Up 002
- Producer: Roy Harper

Roy Harper live album chronology
In Between Every Line (1986)	Born in Captivity II (1992)	Unhinged (1993)

Born in Captivity II is a 1992 live album by English folk/rock singer-songwriter Roy Harper.

== History ==
The album was released as a limited edition (2,000) cassette available by mail order. Though the album is out of print, it has remained popular with Harper fans due to its sound quality, song selection and the standard of performance recorded. It is very true to the 'live experience'.

Harper's son, Nick Harper, makes guest appearances playing guitar on a number of songs, and English cricketer Graeme Fowler makes an appearance playing drums on the song "Hope". According to Harper's spoken introduction "Three Hundred Words" was written for Fowlers benefit concert.

The album was re-released in 1993 as Unhinged, and re-issued again in 1995 (with a different cover) on Harper's own label, Science Friction (HUCD020). Neither of these CD releases contain all 14 of the original tracks found on the cassette, probably due to the time constraints of the CD format compared to the original C90 cassette. ("Short and Sweet" and the poem "Yet" have been omitted from the CD reissues).

== Track listing ==
=== Side One ===
1. "Descendants Of Smith" – 5:13 (Wulfrun Hall, Wolverhampton – 29 November 1991)
2. "Short and Sweet" – 10:11 (Wulfrun Hall, Wolverhampton – 29 November 1991)
3. "When An Old Cricketer Leaves The Crease" – 6:31 (Wulfrun Hall, Wolverhampton – 29 November 1991)
4. "Three Hundred Words" (Poem) – 2:52, 5b. "Hope" – 5:34 (Forum Theatre, Wythenshawe, Manchester – 17 November 1991)
5. "Naked Flame" – 5:33 (Bloomsbury Theatre, London – 1 June 1990)
6. "South Africa" – 5:39 (Bloomsbury Theatre, London – 31 May 1990)
7. "North Country" – 6:07 (Wulfrun Hall, Wolverhampton – 29 November 1991)

=== Side Two ===
1. "Commune" – 4:53 (Bloomsbury Theatre, London – 1 June 1990)
2. "Yet" (Poem) – 4:18 (Civic Theatre, Leeds – 10 November 1989)
3. "Back To The Stones" – 5:25 (The Queen's Hall, Edinburgh – 11 November 1989)
4. "Legend" – 3:05 (Bloomsbury Theatre, London – 31 May 1990)
5. "Frozen Moment" – 8:12 (Civic Theatre, Leeds – 10 November 1989)
6. "Highway Blues" – 5:41 (Wulfrun Hall, Wolverhampton – 29 November 1991)
7. "The Same Old Rock" – 10:36 (Forum Theatre, Wythenshawe, Manchester – 17 November 1991)

== Personnel ==
- Roy Harper – Guitar and vocals
- Nick Harper – Guitar
- Graeme Fowler – drums
