= Man and Myth =

Man & Myth

Studio album by Roy Harper
- Released: 23 September 2013
- Recorded: Ireland, USA, UK
- Genres: Folk, folk baroque, indie folk
- Length: 51.28
- Label: Bella Union
- Producers: Roy Harper with additional production by Jonathan Wilson and John Fitzgerald

Roy Harper chronology
The Green Man (2000)	Man & Myth (2013)

Professional ratings
Aggregate scores
Source	Rating
Metacritic	84/100
Review scores
Source	Rating
AllMusic	4/5 stars
The Australian	4/5 stars
Daily Express	5/5 stars
Financial Times	4/5 stars
The Guardian	4/5 stars
MusicOMH	4.5/5 stars
The Observer	4/5 stars
Pitchfork	7.0/10
Record Collector	5/5 stars
Uncut	9/10

Man & Myth is the title of Roy Harper's 22nd studio album. Released 47 years after his debut album, Sophisticated Beggar, it is his first studio release in 13 years.

== Background ==
When questioned during a Reuters interview about the time span between his album releases, Harper explained: "I thought I had retired...I was in one world, but the next world had found me, so I had to respond to it. That meant gathering my wits and going forward with a new record." "I've written poetry, prose, essays and articles and gone through the motions of being Roy, but I didn’t have the will to make another album until recently..." said Harper. "...I was inspired to write again around 2009, by many of the younger generation finding me and asking, who are you?".

== Recording ==
Of the seven tracks, four were recorded with Jonathan Wilson at his Fivestar Studios in Echo Park. "Heaven Is Here", "The Exile", and "January Man" were recorded in County Cork. Pete Townshend plays lead guitar on "Cloud Cuckooland".

== Album promotion ==
On 18 July 2013 Mojo magazine's website featured the track "Time is Temporary" as their Track of the Day.

""Time is Temporary" is the sound of a man who is capable of contemplating his mortality as well as musing on coincidence, convergence and circumstance" said Harper. The track is "based on a thought... that maybe I will pass you in the street, or in a train, or a restaurant, and we'll look at each other and have the same sort of feelings, but never take it any further, never take the next step that both of us seemed to want to, so we'll never know what might have been".

In the run up to the album's release, Harper was interviewed by Laura Rawlings on her BBC Radio Bristol show on 15 August 2013. The interview closed with the track "Desert Island", from Harper's 1988 release Descendants of Smith, being played.

On the album's release date, 23 September 2013, Harper played an in-store performance at Rough Trade East, London. A limited number of tickets were available to those who purchased the album in store that day, and the event was also streamed live to 1000 viewers who had pre-ordered the album and been given a pass.

== Critical reception ==
The album received favourable reviews from many critics and journalists alike. Molloy Woodcraft, writing for The Observer, called the album "an absolute corker" and "a great record". Reviewing for the Music website, Drowned in Sound, Matthew Slaughter stated "...it’s a record of reflection, of experimentation, sometimes of egotism, often of near-mystical sadness". "Restless, melodic and endlessly absorbing, Man & Myth is the sound of an artist at the peak of his power" was the conclusion by Martin Townsend in his review for the Daily Express. Steve Creedy reviewing for The Australian stated the album "compares well with illustrious predecessors such as Stormcock and HQ" and that it was "a welcome addition to a remarkable career". The Financial Times reviewer, Ludovic Hunter-Tilney awarded the album four out of five stars and said "acoustic guitar melodies meander along gracefully, building into moments of great agitation; raw emotional honesty coexists with mythmaking lyrics romanticising Harper as the eternal outsider". Writing for Goldmine, Dave Thompson proclaimed Man and Myth to be "a genuine triumph, a magnificent achievement...this isn’t a 'return to form'. It’s business as brilliant [as] usual. Allmusic reviewer Thom Jurek praised Harper's writing for remaining "keen and opulent" and stated that his "loopy phrasing and lyrics lie in their own country" existing "outside of the usual singer-songwriter tropes". His melismatic phrasing is as musical as the gorgeous strings, guitars, drums, and mellotrons in the sonic architecture framing his voice. Man and Myth is Harper at his best, fully in command of his vision, his curious, lovely melodic sensibility, and, of course, his poetry".

In November 2013, Mojo placed Man and Myth at 39 in their list of the top 50 Albums of 2013. The song, "January Man" was mentioned as the stand out track, and was included on their 'Best of 2013' Covermount CD. Uncut placed Man & Myth at 6 in their top 50 Albums of 2013. A track from the album was also placed on their 'Sound of 2013' Covermount CD, January 2014 issue.

== Man and Myth UK Tour ==
In support of the album's release Harper undertook a short, three date, UK tour, performing at the Royal Festival Hall, London, (22 October), the Bridgewater Hall, Manchester (25 October) and the Colston Hall, Bristol (27 October). At each performance he was accompanied by Jonathan Wilson (following Wilson's opening acoustic set) and supported by a string and brass ensemble performing arrangements by Fiona Brice.

== Formats ==
The album is available in three formats. CD, a limited edition, double gatefold, three sided, heavyweight (180g) vinyl LP with etching on the fourth side (Compact disc included), and as an MP3 or FLAC download from Harper's website.

== Track listing ==
All tracks credited to Roy Harper

1. The Enemy—7:34
2. Time Is Temporary—4:57
3. January Man—4:32
4. The Stranger—5:26
5. Cloud Cuckooland—5:44
6. Heaven Is Here—15:24
7. The Exile—7:55

== Personnel ==
- Roy Harper – guitar, vocals
- Jonathan Wilson – banjo, guitar, mandolin, bass guitar and backing vocals
- John Fitzgerald – bouzouki, Oud, bass guitar, guitar – engineering
- Pete Townshend – electric guitar
- Tony Franklin – bass guitar
- Jake Blanton – bass guitar
- Jason Borger – keyboard
- Fiona Brice – Strings and brass
- Gillon Cameron – Violin
- Bertrand Galen – Cello
- Richard Gowen – drums and percussion
- Justin Grounds – Violin
- Matt Gunner – Horn
- George Hart – Double bass
- Andy Irvine – Mandola, bouzouki
- James King – Alto saxophone
- Vicky Matthews – Cello
- Neal Morgan – percussion
- Gabe Noel – Cello, Double bass
- Tom Piggot-Smith – Violin
- Rachel Robson – Viola
- Bill Shanley – guitar
- Beth Symmons – Double bass
- Omar Velasco – clavinet and mellotron
