= Unhinged (album) =

Live album by Roy Harper
- Released: 1993
- Recorded: England, Scotland
- Genre: Rock
- Length: 75:22
- Label: Griffin GCDHR-132-2; Science Friction HUCD020
- Producer: Roy Harper

Roy Harper chronology
Born in Captivity II (1992)	Unhinged (1993)	Live At Les Cousins (1996)

Alternative Cover
- 1995 Science Friction Reissue Cover

Professional ratings
Review scores
Source	Rating
Allmusic	3/5 stars

Unhinged is a 1993 live album by English folk/rock singer-songwriter Roy Harper.

== History ==
Initially the album, recorded at various concerts in the UK between 1989 and 1991, was intended as an introductory album for the Canadian market, at a time when Harper appeared to be contemplating a move to the North American continent.

The album features 12 of the 14 tracks originally released on 1992s limited edition (2,000) cassette release Born in Captivity II. The tracks 'running order' has been altered from the original cassette version too.

Harper's son Nick Harper, makes guest appearances playing guitar on a number of songs, and English cricketer Graeme Fowler makes an appearance playing drums on the song "Hope".

The CD was reissued with a different cover in 1995 on Harper's label, Science Friction (HUCD020). Again, two tracks (one song, "Short and Sweet" and one poem, "Yet") were omitted from the CD reissue. The album has remained popular with Harper fans due to its sound quality, song selection and the standard of performance recorded. It is very true to the 'live experience'.

The album's title Unhinged, was a play on the title of the popular MTV series, "Unplugged".

== Track listing ==
1. "Descendants Of Smith" – 5:13 (Wulfrun Hall, Wolverhampton – 29 November 1991)
2. "Legend" – 3:05 (Bloomsbury Theatre, London – 31 May 1990)
3. "North Country" – 6:07 (Wulfrun Hall, Wolverhampton – 29 November 1991)
4. "When An Old Cricketer Leaves The Crease" – 6:31 (Wulfrun Hall, Wolverhampton – 29 November 1991)
5. "Three Hundred Words" – 2:52, 5b. "Hope" – 5:34 (Forum Theatre, Wythenshawe, Manchester – 17 November 1991)
6. "Naked Flame" – 5:33 (Bloomsbury Theatre, London – 1 June 1990)
7. "Commune" – 4:53 (Bloomsbury Theatre, London – 1 June 1990)
8. "South Africa" – 5:39 (Bloomsbury Theatre, London – 31 May 1990)
9. "Back To The Stones" – 5:25 (The Queens Hall, Edinburgh – 11 November 1989)
10. "Frozen Moment" – 8:12 (Civic Theatre, Leeds – 10 November 1989)
11. "Highway Blues" – 5:41 (Wulfrun Hall, Wolverhampton – 29 November 1991)
12. "The Same Old Rock" – 10:36 (Forum Theatre, Wythenshawe, Manchester – 17 November 1991)

== Personnel ==
- Roy Harper – guitar and vocals
- Nick Harper – guitar
- Graeme Fowler – drums
