= Songs of Love and Loss =

Compilation album by Roy Harper
- Released: 2011
- Recorded: England
- Genre: Folk, rock
- Length: 1:33:21
- Label: SALVO DCD222
- Producer: Roy Harper

Roy Harper chronology
From Occident to Orient (2007)	Songs of Love and Loss (2011)

Alternative Cover
- Download album cover

Professional ratings
Review scores
Source	Rating
Allmusic	link

Songs of Love and Loss is the 11th compilation album by English folk rock singer-songwriter Roy Harper

== History ==
In early 2011, Roy Harper signed a deal with Believe Digital to release 19 of his albums, for the first time, to the digital market place. This 2-disc, 23-track, compilation was required as an introduction to lead the release campaign and contains songs from 11 of Harpers albums released between 1966 (Sophisticated Beggar) and 1992 (Death or Glory?). The catalogue was to be released in batches of four over the year.

The album is presented in two volumes and, according to the artist, "contains songs specially selected from their original records and digitally re-mastered to work as two dynamically unique albums in their own right". According to The Guardian the album "displays the unerring quality and startling originality of his [Harper's] writing".

Songs of Love and Loss is also available as a download on Harpers website in both FLAC and MP3 format.

== Track listing ==
All tracks credited to Roy Harper

=== Disc One ===
1. "Black Clouds" (2011) – 4:34
2. "Girlie" (2011) – 3:04
3. "All You Need Is" (2011) – 5:46
4. "Francesca" – 1:19
5. "East Of The Sun" – 3:02
6. "Little Lady" – 4:19
7. "North Country" – 3:35
8. "I'll See You Again" – 5:02
9. "Naked Flame" – 5:08
10. "Commune" – 4:35
11. "Frozen Moment" – 3:29

=== Disc Two ===
1. "Davey" (2011) – 1:31
2. "Another Day" – 2:59
3. "South Africa" – 4:06
4. "Hallucinating Light" – 6:24
5. "Sleeping At The Wheel" – 4:19
6. "Waiting For Godot" – 3:35
7. "The Flycatcher" – 4:09
8. "On Summer Day" – 5:39
9. "Cherishing The Lonesome" – 5:56
10. "My Friend" (2011) – 4:08
11. "One More Tomorrow" – 5:22
12. "Forever" – 3:31
