= In Between Every Line =

Live album by Roy Harper
- Released: 1986
- Recorded: England
- Genre: Rock
- Length: 79:20
- Label: EMI EN 5004; Griffin; Science Friction HUCD018
- Producer: Roy Harper

Roy Harper chronology
'Live at the Red Lion, Birmingham' (1985)	In Between Every Line (1986)	'Born in Captivity II' (1992)

Professional ratings
Review scores
Source	Rating
Allmusic	3/5 stars

In Between Every Line is a 1986 live double album by English folk/rock singer-songwriter Roy Harper.

== History ==
The album was created over a period of eighteen months and contains an assortment of Harper's live favourites e.g. "One of those days in England", "Highway Blues" and "One man Rock and Roll band". Some of the recordings are from Harper's performances at the Cambridge Folk Festival. Jimmy Page appears on guitar on three tracks, however, specific details as to who plays on all the tracks, or where and when the tracks were recorded were not provided in the liner notes as the original "...tape boxes were mixed! Or lost".

The album also contains a live performance of "Short and Sweet", a song by David Gilmour and Roy Harper. The original version of this track were released on David Gilmour and, featuring both musicians, on Harper's The Unknown Soldier.

Initially released on vinyl and cassette, the album's length was reduced when converted to CD by omitting the last track, "Hangman".

The album was dedicated to Derek Jewell, British writer, broadcaster and music critic.

== Track listing ==
All songs by Roy Harper, except as noted.

Side one

1. "One of Those Days in England " – 21:14

Side two

1. "Short and Sweet" (feat: Jimmy Page) (Gilmour/Harper) – 7:19
2. "Referendum" (feat: Jimmy Page) – 4:37
3. "Highway Blues" (feat: Jimmy Page) – 6:57

Side three

1. "True Story" – 6:44
2. "The Game" – 13:55

Side four

1. "One Man Rock and Roll Band" – 14:16
2. "Hangman" – 9:36

== Personnel ==
- Roy Harper – Guitar, Vocals, Keyboards, Saxophone
- Nick Harper – Guitar
- Jimmy Page – Guitar
- Steve Broughton – Drums, Guitar, Keyboards, Vocals
- Tony Franklin – Bass
- Nik Green – Keyboards, Synthesizer
- Robin Ayling – Production
