= Cloud cuckoo land =

Term for an unrealistically idealistic state of mind

Cloud cuckoo land is a state of absurdity, over-optimistic fantasy or an unrealistically idealistic state of mind where everything appears to be perfect. Someone who is said to "live in cloud cuckoo land" is a person who thinks that completely impossible things might happen, rather than understanding how things really are. It also hints that the person referred to is naive, unaware of reality or deranged in holding such an optimistic belief.

In the modern world, a "cloud cuckoo lander" is defined as someone who is seen as "crazy" or "strange" by most average people. Cloud cuckoo landers often do or say things that seemingly only make sense to themselves; they also display cleverness at times in ways no one else would think of.

Cockaigne, the land of plenty in medieval myth, can be considered the predecessor to the modern-day cloud cuckoo land, which is depicted as a realm that could be seen as an escape from the complexities of real life. It was an imaginary place of extreme luxury and ease where physical comforts and pleasures were always immediately at hand and where the harshness of medieval peasant life did not exist.

== Literary sources ==
The origin of the term is in a play by Aristophanes, a Greek playwright, who wrote and directed a comedy, The Birds, first performed in 414 BC, in which Pisthetaerus, a middle-aged Athenian, persuades the world's birds to create a new city in the sky to be named Νεφελοκοκκυγία (Nephelokokkygia) or Cloud Cuckoo Land (Latin: Nubicuculia), thereby gaining control over all communications between men and gods.

The German philosopher Arthur Schopenhauer used the word (German Wolkenkuckucksheim) in his publication On the Fourfold Root of the Principle of Sufficient Reason in 1813, as well as later in his main work The World as Will and Representation and in other places. Here, he gave it its figurative sense by reproaching other philosophers for only talking about Cloud-cuckoo-land. The German philosopher Friedrich Nietzsche refers to the term in his essay "On Truth and Lying in a Nonmoral Sense".

In 1923 the Viennese satirist and critic Karl Kraus published Wolkenkuckucksheim (Cloudcuckooland), an adaptation of The Birds by Aristophanes.

== Uses in politics ==
Author Edward Crankshaw used the term when discussing the Deák-Andrássy Plan of 1867 in his 1963 book The Fall of the House of Habsburg (Chapter 13, "The Iron Ring of Fate").

The phrase has been used by British and American politicians as well as writers. Margaret Thatcher used this phrase in the 1980s: "The ANC is a typical terrorist organisation... Anyone who thinks it is going to run the government in South Africa is living in cloud-cuckoo land." Bernard Ingham, Thatcher's spokesman, who, when asked if the ANC might overthrow the government of South Africa by force, replied: "It is cloud-cuckoo land for anyone to believe that could be done". MP Ann Widdecombe used the phrase in a debate on drug prohibition with a representative of the Transform Drug Policy Foundation: "it is cloud cuckoo land to suggest that [people who don't currently use heroin would not start using it if it became legal]".

Newt Gingrich referred to Barack Obama's claim that algae could be used as a fuel source as cloud cuckoo land. Henry A. Wallace, U.S. Secretary of Agriculture (later U.S. Vice President in Franklin D. Roosevelt's third term), used the term to describe the unrealistically inflated value of company shares publicly listed on the New York Stock Exchange just before the crash of 1929 that signaled the onset of the Great Depression. In his 1936 book, Whose Constitution? An Inquiry into the General Welfare, Wallace describes a cartoon in a popular weekly magazine which "pictured an airplane in an endurance flight refueling in mid-air, and made fun of the old fashioned economist down below who was saying it couldn't be done. The economic aeroplane was to keep on gaining elevation indefinitely, with the millennium just around a cloud" (p. 75). Wallace wrote that Wall Street's practice of lending money to Europe after World War I "to pay interest on the [war reparations] debts she owed us and to buy the products we wanted to sell her ... was the international refueling device that for 12 years kept our economic aeroplane above the towering peaks of our credit structure and the massive wall of our tariff, in Cloud-Cuckoo Land."

Paul Krugman used the phrase referring to inadequate German economic politics toward failing members of the European Union: "Basically, it seems that even as the euro approaches a critical juncture, senior German officials are living in Wolkenkuckucksheim—cloud-cuckoo land." (9 June 2012). Yuri N. Maltsev, an Austrian economist and economic historian, uses the term to describe the lack of promised results in the communist states in his foreword to a 1920 essay by Ludwig von Mises: "Today, the disastrous consequences of enforcing the utopia on the unfortunate populations of the communist states are clear even to their leaders. As Mises predicted, despite the cloud-cuckoo lands of their fancy, roasted pigeons failed to fly into the mouths of the comrades."

== Other uses ==
The phrase has been used in poetry, music, film, and by writers. Cloudcuckooland, a poetry collection by Simon Armitage. Cloudcuckooland, the first album by the Lightning Seeds, released in 1990. In 2002, electronic music producer Sasha released a track called "Cloud Cuckoo" on his album Airdrawndagger. Radiohead uses the term in the lyrics of their song "Like Spinning Plates". The 5th track on English folk rock singer Roy Harper's final studio album Man and Myth is titled Cloud Cuckooland. Publisher and editor Gary Groth uses the term in the title of his review of Scott McCloud's book Reinventing Comics.

Cloud Cuckoo Land has been used as a stand-in for Hollywood as in Stella Gibbons's Cold Comfort Farm. Dorothy Sayers, in the Author's Note to her novel Gaudy Night (1936), explains that the story, while set in Oxford, is entirely fictitious, concluding that “...the novelist's only native country is Cloud-Cuckooland, where they do but jest, poison in jest: no offense in the world.” (The final words are a reference to Hamlet, Act 3, Scene 2.)

Cloud Cuckooland is the name of the eighth world found in the video game Banjo-Tooie.

Cloud Cuckoo Land is the name of a realm hidden inside a cloud featured in The Lego Movie. An iconoclastic, mixed-genre world where there are no rules or unhappy things, and serves as a hidden base for the rebel protagonists and the councils of the Master Builder. It is destroyed by Lord Business's army and falls into pieces before drowning in a giant Lego ocean.

Cloud Cuckoo Land is the title of a 1925 novel by Scottish novelist and poet Naomi Mitchison.

Cloud Cuckoo Land is the title of a 2002 novel by American novelist Lisa Borders.

Cloud Cuckoo Land is the name of a September 2021 novel by Pulitzer Prize for Fiction winning author Anthony Doerr.

== See also ==
- Escapism
- Imagination
- Instinct
- Just-world fallacy
- Mental image
- Outline of thought
- Philosophy of mind
- Self-deception
- Stupor
- Unconscious mind
- Utopia
- Virtual reality
