= Short and sweet =

Short and sweet may refer to:

- "Short and Sweet", a song by Roy Harper and David Gilmour, recorded separately for the former's The Unknown Soldier (album) album and the latter's David Gilmour (album)
- Short n' Sweet - the sixth studio album by American singer Sabrina Carpenter
- Short+Sweet - a multi-form arts festival in Australia.
