= Stormcock =

Stormcock may refer to:

- Stormcock, another name for the Mistle thrush (Turdus viscivorus)
- Stormcock (album), a 1971 album by Roy Harper
