= Live at Les Cousins =

Live album by Roy Harper
- Released: 1996
- Recorded: 30 August 1969, Les Cousins, London, England
- Genre: Folk, progressive folk
- Length: 121:09
- Label: Blueprint BP220CD; Science Friction HUCD036
- Producer: Roy Harper

Roy Harper chronology
| Unhinged (1993) | Live at Les Cousins (1996) | The BBC Tapes – Volume II (In Concert 1974) (1997) |

Professional ratings
Review scores
| Source | Rating |
|---|---|
| Allmusic | 4.5/5 stars |

Live at Les Cousins is a 1996 double live album by English folk/rock singer-songwriter Roy Harper.

== History ==
The album was recorded in Les Cousins, a folk and blues club in the basement of a restaurant in Greek Street, in the Soho district of London, England. The club was most popular during the second British folk revival of the mid-1960s, and was notable as a venue in which musicians of that period met and learnt from each other. It was influential in the careers of numerous artists; Harper himself describing it as "a spawning ground".

On the night 30 August 1969, EMI brought their equipment to record Harper's performance as he felt one of his songs ("I Hate The White Man") needed to be recorded live to capture the full essence of the song. The track was included on his 1970 release, Flat Baroque and Berserk, however the rest of the recording remained in the archives of Abbey Road Studios for nearly 30 years. This album makes available the four reels of tape found (an almost complete recording of the concert) and includes Harper's commentary between the songs.

The album is notable for being the earliest known live recording of Harper, for capturing Harper and the audience "in a mood (and mindset) typical for the period" and, according to AllMusics Brian Downing, it shows Harper "coming out of his Jansch-inspired, neo-Dylan period into his more progressive, acoustic one".

== Track listing ==
All tracks credited to Roy Harper

Disc 1

1. "You Don't Need Money" – 6:22
2. "North Country" – 8:06
3. "Hors D'Oeuvres" – 6:17
4. "Blackpool" – 6:38
5. "She's The One" (string change) – 2:24
6. "She's The One" – 8:20
7. "Goldfish" – 5:11
8. "East of the Sun" – 12:19

Disc 2

1. "McGoohan's Blues" – 19:48
2. "Feeling All The Saturday" – 3:09
3. "Zengem" – 1:20
4. "Che" – 6:29
5. "Davey" – 8:53
6. "I Hate The White Man" – 10:38
7. "Goodbye" – 10:33
8. "Tom Tiddler's Ground" (edit) – 4:47

== Personnel ==
- Roy Harper – Guitar and vocals

== See also ==
Tom Tiddler's Ground
