= 2005 Mojo Awards =

British music awards

The 2005 Mojo Honours List.

== Nominees ==
Complete list of nominees (winners in bold):

- Best New Act - presented to an act whose impact has been unparalleled in the last 18 months
  - Antony and the Johnsons
  - Ray LaMontagne
  - Rufus Wainwright
  - Arcade Fire
  - Willy Mason
  - **The Magic Numbers**
- Inspiration Award - presented to an act who has been the catalyst for an entire generation and fellow musicians
  - Pixies
  - **Gang of Four**
  - Tom Waits
  - Morrissey
  - Neil Young
- Mojo Icon - the recipient of this award has enjoyed a spectacular career on a global scale
  - David Bowie
  - John Lydon
  - **Siouxsie Sioux**
  - Marc Bolan
  - Ramones
- Catalogue Release of the Year - presented to the reissue that is both definitive and beautifully packaged
  - The Mamas & the Papas - Complete Anthology
  - The Clash - London Calling 25th Anniversary Edition
  - Jeff Buckley - Grace 10th Anniversary Edition
  - The Kinks - The Kinks Are the Village Green Preservation Society
  - Jack Nitzsche Story 1962-1979 - Hearing is Believing
  - **The Fall - The Complete Peel Sessions 1978–2004**
- Vision Award - presented to the best music DVD package of the year in recognition of sales and visual flair
  - AC/DC - Family Jewels
  - Elvis Presley - '68 Comeback Special
  - Live Aid
  - **Martin Scorsese Presents the Blues**
  - Marc Bolan and T.Rex - Born to Boogie
  - The Rolling Stones - Rock and Roll Circus
- Songwriter Award - presented to an artist whose career has been defined by their ability to pen classic material on a consistent basis
  - **Paul Weller**
  - Brian Wilson
  - Damien Rice
  - Van Morrison
  - Kate Bush
- Classic Album - presented by Mojo to an artist responsible for a landmark release in the history of rock
  - **The Pogues - Rum, Sodomy, and the Lash**
- Roots Award
  - **Chris Hillman**
- Legend Award
  - **Dr. John**
- Hero Award
  - **Roy Harper**
- Lifetime Achievement Award - the ultimate accolade that celebrates a unique contribution as we know it
  - **Robert Wyatt**
- Merit Award
  - **Sly and Robbie**
- Image Award - presented to a photographer whose work has captured and defined the very essence of rock'n'roll
  - **Jim Marshall**
- Hall of Fame - presented to an act or solo star who is best described as "an artists' artist"
  - **Madness**
- Les Paul Award - presented in conjunction with guitarist Les Paul to an inspirational player
  - **Jeff Beck**
- Mojo Medal - presented to an unsung industry hero whose contribution has changed the face of music as we know it
  - **Chess Records**
- Maverick Award
  - **Steve Earle**
- Special Commendation for Hippo Select part of Universal USA for the following releases:
  - The Complete Motown Singles Vol 1: 59-61
  - Burt Bacharach - Something Big
  - Doug Sahm & the Sir Douglas Quintet
  - Muddy Waters (McKinley Morganfield) - Hoochie Coochie Man: The Complete Chess Masters Vol 2, 1952-1958
