= Today Is Yesterday =

Compilation album by Roy Harper
- Released: October 21, 2002
- Recorded: England
- Genre: Folk
- Length: 54:47
- Label: Science Friction HUCD037
- Producer: Roy Harper

Roy Harper chronology
East of the Sun (2001)	Today Is Yesterday (2002)	Counter Culture (2005)

Professional ratings
Review scores
Source	Rating

Today Is Yesterday is a 2002 compilation album by English folk/rock singer-songwriter Roy Harper. Amongst its 17 tracks are six unreleased and eight rare songs. All the tracks were recorded between 1964 and 1969.

== History ==
Tracks 1–9 date from 1964 to 1965 and were recorded on an old mono Ferrograph quarter-inch Reel-to-reel audio tape deck. These tracks formed a demo tape that landed Harper his first record contract. Track 10 is a re-recording of a part of that demo tape and became the B-side of Harper's first single.

Tracks 11 and 13 became Harper's second single, while track 12 was a single contender which didn't make the cut. Track 14 is the latest recording on this album. Tracks 15 and 16 were both recorded in 1967. Track 15 became the A-side of Harper's third single, however track 16 was rejected. Track 17 goes back to 1965–1966 and is the A-side of Harper's first single.

== Track listing ==
All tracks credited to Roy Harper

1. "Long Hot Summer's Day" – 3:47
2. "The Scaffold Of The Daylight" – 2:40
3. "Black Clouds" – 4:48
4. "Girlie" – 3:31
5. "In The Morning" – 2:25
6. "Love" – 3:06
7. "Forever" – 2:53
8. "Little Old Lady" – 4:50
9. "Mountain" – 3:40
10. "Pretty Baby" – 2:31
11. "Midspring Dithering" – 2:43
12. "(It's Tomorrow And) Today Is Yesterday" – 4:06
13. "Zengem" – 1:34
14. "Zaney Janey" – 3:28
15. "Life Goes By" – 3:16
16. "Night Fighter (Ballad Of A Songwriter)" – 3:05
17. "Take Me Into Your Eyes" – 2:27

== Personnel ==
- Roy Harper
