= Once (Roy Harper album) =

Studio album by Roy Harper
- Released: May 1990
- Recorded: Harper's home in Lincolnshire
- Genre: Rock
- Length: 41:38
- Label: IRS Records, Awareness Records
- Producer: Roy Harper

Roy Harper chronology
Loony on the Bus (1988)	Once (1990)	Death or Glory? (1992)

Professional ratings
Review scores
Source	Rating
Allmusic	4/5 stars

Once is the 16th studio album by English rock/folk singer-songwriter Roy Harper, released in 1990.

== History ==
David Gilmour, Kate Bush, Nick Harper and Nigel Mazlyn Jones appear on the album, with both Gilmour and Bush on the title track.

== Songs ==
=== The Black Cloud of Islam ===
The track "The Black Cloud of Islam" is a despairing castigation of radical Islam. The song provoked some criticism, to which Harper responded, in 2006, when he wrote: "I let my guard slip. I knew that I’d let it slip. I wanted it to slip. I was absolutely sick of being politically correct. I am not politically correct, I never have been..". His stated reason for penning the song was his "feelings of despair" about his "worst dreams coming true" about religion gaining ground. Religion, he stated on his personal blog, was something he regarded with the "deepest possible suspicion" and now, to his horror, he could see it "about to storm the world" and "take over whole swathes of humanity"; a thought that he detested and made him "want to die on the spot". In a later interview with The Daily Telegraph, the matter of this song was raised. Harper asserted that he wrote the song "as a liberal, not as a racist" and was inspired to do so by the 1988 Lockerbie Bombing.

=== Berliners ===
The opening verse of "Berliners" is the 4th stanza of Laurence Binyon's "Ode of Remembrance", and is preceded by a recording of a Remembrance Day ceremony where the same stanza was recited. The song also uses a BBC news broadcast describing the fall of the Berlin Wall.

== Video ==
Harper supported the release of the album by touring the UK. One of the concerts took place at the Dominion Theatre (a West End theatre on Tottenham Court Road in the London Borough of Camden) and was filmed. The concert took place on 22 November 1990, the same night Margaret Thatcher announced her resignation as Prime Minister which Harper referenced closing the concert by stating "...it's been a day to remember on many levels, it can only get better...if you can spoke the wheel of the present authority, then do it as quickly as possible, we need a change...". The concert film was later released as Roy Harper Once – Live.

== Track listing ==
All tracks composed by Roy Harper

1. "Once"
2. "Once in the Middle of Nowhere"
3. "Nowhere to Run to"
4. "The Black Cloud of Islam"
5. "If"
6. "Winds of Change"
7. "Berliners"
8. "Sleeping at the Wheel"
9. "For Longer Than It Takes"
10. "Ghost Dance"

== Personnel ==
- Roy Harper – guitar, vocals
- David Gilmour – guitar
- Nick Harper – guitar
- Nigel Mazlyn Jones – guitar, dulcimer
- Tony Franklin – bass
- Steve Broughton – drums, percussion
- Mark Feltham – harmonica
- Jacqui Harper, Kate Bush, Terry Cooke – backing vocals
