= Roy Harper (singer) =

British singer-songwriter (born 1941)

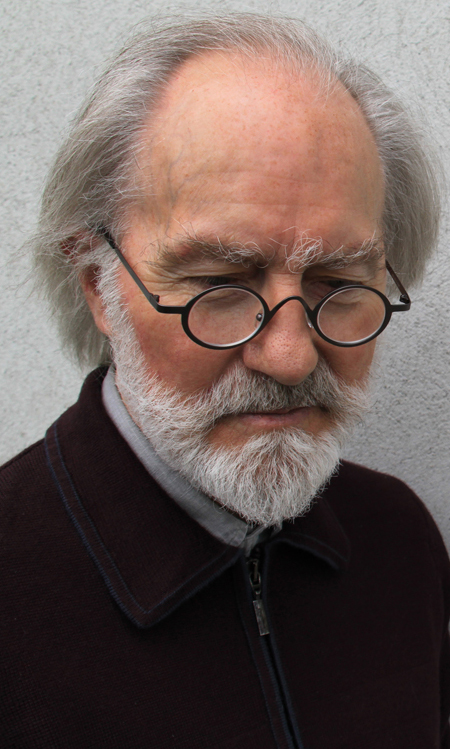
- Harper in 2011

Background information
- Born: 12 June 1941 (age 85); Rusholme, Manchester, England
- Genres: Folk; folk baroque; folk rock; indie folk; progressive folk
- Occupations: Singer; musician; songwriter; poet
- Instruments: Vocals; guitar; harmonica
- Years active: 1964–present
- Labels: Science Friction; Liberty; CBS; Harvest; Chrysalis; Beggars Banquet; I.R.S.; Bella Union
- Website: royharper.co.uk

Roy Harper (born 12 June 1941) is an English folk rock singer, songwriter, poet and guitarist. He has released 22 studio albums (and 10 live ones) across a career that stretches back to 1966. As a musician, Harper is known for his distinctive fingerstyle playing and lengthy, lyrical, complex compositions, reflecting his love of jazz and the poet John Keats.

Harper's influence has been acknowledged by Led Zeppelin, Pete Townshend, Kate Bush, Pink Floyd, and Ian Anderson, of Jethro Tull, who said Harper was his "primary influence as an acoustic guitarist and songwriter." Neil McCormick of The Daily Telegraph described him as "one of Britain's most complex and eloquent lyricists and genuinely original songwriters... much admired by his peers". Across the Atlantic, his influence has been acknowledged by Seattle-based acoustic band Fleet Foxes, American musician and producer Jonathan Wilson, and Californian harpist Joanna Newsom, with whom he has also toured.

In 2005, Harper was awarded the MOJO Hero Award, and in 2013 a Lifetime Achievement Award at the BBC Radio 2 Folk Awards. His most recent album, Man and Myth, was released in 2013. In 2016, Harper celebrated his 75th birthday by performing concerts in Clonakilty, Birmingham, Manchester, London, and Edinburgh. He performed additional concerts in 2019 and 2025.

== Early life ==
Harper was born in 1941 in Rusholme, a suburb of Manchester. His mother, Muriel, died three weeks after he was born. From the age of six, he lived in St Annes-on-Sea, a place he described as being "like a cemetery with bus stops". He was brought up by his father and stepmother, with whom he became disillusioned because of her religious beliefs (although they reconciled in 1980, just before her death). His anti-religious views would later become a familiar theme within his music.

Harper began writing poems when he was 12. At the age of 13, he began playing skiffle music with his younger brother David ("Davey" on the album Flat Baroque and Berserk), as well as becoming influenced by blues music. At 14 he formed his first group (De Boys) with his brothers David and Harry. Harper was educated at King Edward VII School, Lytham St Annes, then a grammar school, and left at the age of 15 (1956) to join the Royal Air Force to follow an ambition to be a pilot. After two years, Harper rejected the rigid discipline and feigned madness to obtain a military discharge, as a result receiving an electroconvulsive therapy treatment at Princess Mary's RAF Hospital, Wendover. After being discharged from there, he spent one day inside the former Lancaster Moor Mental Institute before escaping. These experiences would be recalled in "Committed", a song on Harper's debut album, Sophisticated Beggar. From around 1961, he busked around North Africa, Europe, and London for a few years.

Musically, Harper's earliest influences were American blues musician Lead Belly and folk singer Woody Guthrie and, in his teens, jazz musician Miles Davis. Of the blues musicians Lead Belly, Big Bill Broonzy, and Josh White, Harper said they made music which "...seemed to be from a different planet ...We'd never heard anything like it. It changed our world overnight, a sledge hammer of a cultural change ...an equivalent would be to suddenly hear music from outer space". Harper was also exposed to classical music in his childhood and has pointed to the influence of Jean Sibelius's Karelia Suite. Lyrical influences include the 19th century Romantics, especially Shelley, and Keats's poem "Endymion". Harper has also cited the Beat poets as being highly influential, particularly Jack Kerouac. Harper played his first paid performance at a poetry reading in Newcastle in 1960.

Returning to the UK in 1963 or 1964, Harper started to write more songs than poetry. He obtained a residency at London's famous Soho folk music club Les Cousins in 1965, having been introduced to it by Peter Bellamy of The Young Tradition. Harper's first advertised performance was on 5 October 1965. Within his first week Harper saw John Renbourn, Alexis Korner, Paul Simon, Alex Campbell, and Bert Jansch play, and he would play and associate with other artists later, including John Martyn, Joni Mitchell, and Nick Drake.

== Musical career ==
=== 1966–69: The first record deals ===
Harper's first album, Sophisticated Beggar, was recorded in 1966 after he was spotted at Les Cousins and signed to Strike Records. The album consisted of Harper's songs and poetry backed by acoustic guitar, recorded with a Revox tape machine by Pierre Tubbs and with contributions from English guitarist Paul Brett. Columbia Records recognised Harper's potential and hired American producer Shel Talmy to produce Harper's second album, Come Out Fighting Ghengis Smith, which was released in 1968. The 11-minute track "Circle", "a soundscape of Harper's difficult youth", was notable for marking a widening of his musical style away from the more traditional side of contemporary folk music heard at the time. Harper had an interest in traditional folk but did not consider himself a bona fide member of the folk scene. He later explained:

I was too much of a modernist, really. Just too modern for what was going on in the folk clubs. I wanted to modernise music, but more than that to completely modernise people's attitudes towards life in general. I was involved in trying to bring (more) meat to the (contemporary) folk music...(of the time).

Harper's record company had different expectations. 'They wanted me to write commercial pop songs and when they heard the album I made for them, they didn't have a clue. They wanted hits. And I gave them "Circle"'. Bert Jansch contributed sleeve notes for the album and Harper paid tribute to Jansch with the song "Pretty Baby"; the B-side non-album track of his first single (released in March 1966). During this period, Harper was managed by American music entrepreneur Jo Lustig, manager of Pentangle and former agent to Julie Felix.

In June 1968, Harper performed at the first free concert ever held at Hyde Park, acting as compere and sharing the bill with Jethro Tull, Pink Floyd and Tyrannosaurus Rex. At the time, he spoke of co-writing a rock opera with Pink Floyd. No opera resulted, but it was the beginning of a musical relationship. Harper began to attract a following of fans from the underground music scene and tour the UK, performing at numerous venues such as the Lyceum Ballroom, Klooks Kleek and Mothers; venues that would gradually gain recognition for the variety and quality of their musical acts. Mothers in Birmingham was one such venue, and one to which Harper would frequently return. Harper later told Brum Beat magazine:

That was the first club outside London that meant anything at all and that's why there's been this long association with Birmingham. I played there about six times between 1968 and 1970. I have always enjoyed playing here.

A track from Come Out Fighting Ghengis Smith, "Nobody's Got Any Money in the Summer" also appeared on the first bargain-priced sampler album, The Rock Machine Turns You On. The album was released in the UK, the Netherlands, Germany and a number of other European countries as part of an international marketing campaign by Columbia Records (known in Europe as CBS).

In 1969, Harper undertook a short 6-venue tour with Ron Geesin and Ralph McTell. The tour programme contained the introductory paragraph:

Roy Harper isn't an example of any category, the epitome of any movement or a rung on anybody's ladder; he built himself alone, piece by piece and his defiant character stands proud as if chiselled from belligerent granite.

That same year, Harper released his third album Folkjokeopus again produced by Shel Talmy, and released by Liberty Records. Side two included an extended 17-minute track, titled "McGoohan's Blues", which Harper referred to as the "main statement" within the album. Of his non-conformance to radio-friendly, standard, three-minute songs, Harper claimed it to be a revolt, and that he regarded the three-minute pop song as an anathema, a jingle to sell a band. (The title for "McGoohan's Blues" was a reference to actor Patrick McGoohan, who had starred in the UK TV series The Prisoner two years earlier). The track "Sergeant Sunshine" would also appear on Son of Gutbucket, a 1969 sampler album released to promote artists on the Liberty Records label.

During this period Harper also visited the Dolphin Club in Oslo, Norway, where he became acquainted with folk singer Lillebjørn Nilsen. Nilsen learned one of Harper's songs, "On the First Day of April", which he translated to "Ravneferd" and recorded for his debut solo album Tilbake in 1971. Harper and Nilsen along with Finn Kalvik performed together on 23 January 1970 at a concert held in the University of Oslo. Harper's visit coincided with the emergence of the Norwegian 'folk music wave' (Visebølgen) and the Norwegian Broadcasting Corporation (NRK) recorded Harper on the occasion of the concert. Kalvik would later go on to record Norwegian versions of two Harper songs; "I Hate the White Man" ("Den hvite mann") and "Don't You Grieve" ("Kjære ikke gråt").

=== 1970–80: The Harvest years ===
With Harper's reputation growing, Pink Floyd's former manager Peter Jenner signed him to a long-term (and at times confrontational) deal with EMI's 'underground' subsidiary, Harvest Records. Over a ten-year period, Harper recorded eight albums at the Abbey Road Studios for the Harvest label and for much of this period was managed and produced by Jenner, initially acting for Blackhill Enterprises. According to Jenner,

Harper is a terrific songwriter, but a bit crazy, like all the best people. The great problem for him was seeing all these people who'd nicked his licks doing so much better than he did. People like Jethro Tull, Led Zeppelin and, to some extent, Roger Waters.

Harper's first tour of the United States followed the release of his fourth studio album, Flat Baroque and Berserk. The album included the track "Another Day", a song destined to be performed live by Harper for many years to come, and covered by several other artists including This Mortal Coil (featuring Elizabeth Fraser on vocals) and Kate Bush. The album also featured the Nice on the track "Hell's Angels"; its ethereal sound achieved by a wah-wah pedal attached to Harper's acoustic guitar.

After the Bath Festival of 1970, Led Zeppelin paid tribute to Harper with their version of the traditional song "Shake 'Em on Down". Retitled "Hats Off to (Roy) Harper", it appeared on the album Led Zeppelin III. According to Jimmy Page, the band admired the way Harper stood by his principles and did not sell out to commercial pressures. In mutual appreciation of their work, Harper would often attend live performances by Led Zeppelin over the subsequent decade and contributed sleeve photography to the album Physical Graffiti.

Harper's critically acclaimed 1971 album was a four-song epic, Stormcock. The album featured Jimmy Page on guitar (credited as "S. Flavius Mercurius" for contractual reasons) and David Bedford's orchestral arrangements (Bedford would also collaborate on some of Harper's future releases). Harper felt the album to be not particularly well promoted by his record label at the time and later stated:

They hated Stormcock. No singles. No way of promoting it on the radio. They said there wasn't any money to market it. Stormcock dribbled out.

Nevertheless, Stormcock would remain a favourite album of Harper's fans and influence musicians for decades to come. Thirty-five years later (in 2006) fellow Mancunian Johnny Marr of English alternative rock band the Smiths said:

If ever there was a secret weapon of a record it would be Stormcock... It's intense and beautiful and clever: Bowie's Hunky Dory's big, badder brother.

Joanna Newsom cited Stormcock as an influence upon her 2006 release Ys and in 2011, Robin Pecknold of Seattle, Washington-based folk band Fleet Foxes stated that he took inspiration from Stormcock when recording Fleet Foxes second album Helplessness Blues.

In 1972, Harper made his acting debut playing Mike Preston alongside Carol White in the John Mackenzie film Made. The film was chosen (along with A Clockwork Orange) to represent Britain at the Venice Film Festival. Harper also recorded the soundtrack for the film, released the following year as Lifemask, again with contributions from Jimmy Page. At the time, Lifemask was created as Harper's final bow, as he had been diagnosed with the (then) little-known genetic condition HHT, which caused polycythemia, incapacitating him. The cover art shows Harper's life mask, as opposed to the 'death mask' it might have been.

After recovering (treatment involved frequent venesection), his next album (Valentine) was released on Valentine's Day, 14 February 1974, and featured contributions from Jimmy Page. A concert to mark its release was held on the same day at London's Rainbow Theatre, with Led Zeppelin's Jimmy Page, Robert Plant, and John Bonham; David Bedford, Max Middleton, Ronnie Lane, and Keith Moon performing alongside Harper. His first live album Flashes from the Archives of Oblivion, featuring two tracks recorded at that concert, soon followed.

Pink Floyd's 1975 release Wish You Were Here saw Harper sing lead vocals on the song "Have a Cigar". Roger Waters intended to record the part himself, but had strained his voice while recording "Shine On You Crazy Diamond" and David Gilmour declined to sing. Harper was recording his album HQ in Studio 2 of Abbey Road at the same time as Pink Floyd were working in Studio 3; learning of the band's dilemma, Harper offered to sing the lead. The song is one of only three songs by Pink Floyd not sung by one of their permanent members (the others being "The Great Gig in the Sky" and "Hey, Hey, Rise Up!"). David Gilmour returned the favour by appearing on HQ, along with Harper's occasional backing band, 'Trigger' (Chris Spedding, Dave Cochran, Bill Bruford and John Paul Jones). The single "When an Old Cricketer Leaves the Crease", taken from HQ, is one of Harper's best known songs. Harper also co-wrote the song "Short and Sweet" with Gilmour for Gilmour's first solo record, David Gilmour (released in 1978), and the song subsequently appeared on his own album The Unknown Soldier (released in 1980).

Controversy followed the release of 1977's Bullinamingvase. The owners of Watford Gap service station objected to criticism of their food – "Watford Gap, Watford Gap/A plate of grease and a load of crap..." – in the lyrics of the song "Watford Gap", as did an EMI board member who was also a non-executive director of Blue Boar (the owners of the service station). Harper was forced to drop it from future UK copies of the album, though it remained on the US LP and reappeared on later CD reissues. The album also featured the song "One of Those Days in England", with backing vocals by Paul and Linda McCartney; the single from the album went to number 42 in the UK charts. During this period, Harper's band were renamed 'Chips' and included Andy Roberts, Dave Lawson, Henry McCullough, John Halsey and Dave Cochran. In April 1978, Harper began writing lyrics for the next Led Zeppelin album with Jimmy Page, but the project was shelved when lead singer Robert Plant returned from a break after the death of his son, Karac Pendragon.

Following the success of Bullinamingvase, Harper was asked "to write another record quickly". Demo recordings with Harper's newly formed backing band 'Black Sheep' (Andy Roberts, Dave Lawson, Henry McCullough, John Halsey and Dave Cochran, a.k.a. Dave C. Drill) were made, but Harper felt them to be rushed. The record company, who "were in the first stages of a collapse in sales", were not interested in the recordings, nor were they prepared to provide studio time when requested, telling Harper to come back in six months. As a result, Harper withheld the publishing rights to that which had been recorded; an album provisionally entitled Commercial Breaks (doesn't it?) and was (in his own words) "outlawed" by the record company.

From 1975 to 1980 Harper worked with English musician and 'Black Sheep' member Andy Roberts sometimes performing as a duo. During this period, Harper spent considerable time in the United States and signed with the US division of Chrysalis Records, who released HQ under a different title – When an Old Cricketer Leaves the Crease – and with alternative artwork. Chrysalis considered the original Hipgnosis-designed album cover of Harper walking on water to be too offensive for an American release. Harper disagreed, but was given no choice by the label. Chrysalis also changed the title of Harper's next album, Bullinamingvase, to One of Those Days in England. In 1978, US Chrysalis reissued Harper's first five Harvest albums, only one of which (Flat, Baroque and Berserk) had been previously released in America.

On 28 December 1979, BBC TV aired the Kate Bush Christmas Special. As well as playing songs from her first two albums, Bush and her guest, Peter Gabriel, performed Harper's "Another Day". Their duet was discussed for release as a single, but never appeared.

Harper returned to the studio a few years after his dispute with EMI to record and prepare his next album The Unknown Soldier. At the time, Harper knew it would be his last release on the label and it was these demos that "...were destined to gather dust on a shelf labelled 'Commercial Breaks'...". (It was not until Harper's 1988 release Loony on the Bus that some of these songs became officially available, and another six years until the album was finally released as Commercial Breaks (1994)).

In 1980 Harper released The Unknown Soldier, which was indeed his final Harvest release. The album features David Gilmour both on guitar and as co-writer of half of its tracks. On one of those tracks, "You", Harper duets with Kate Bush. Harper later reciprocated by singing backing vocals on "Breathing" on Bush's album Never For Ever; Bush's first no. 1 album, the first ever album by a British female solo artist to top the UK album chart, and the first album by any female solo artist to enter the chart at no. 1. Bush thanked Harper on the album's cover for "holding onto the poet in his music". During a BBC Radio interview by Paul Gambaccini, Bush praised Harper, stating:

Roy is one of the greatest English songwriters we've had, and people just don't realise it. And I really think that when they do we're going to have another top songwriter up there. He's brilliant.

Of Bush, Harper later said,

Kate is a fantastic musician and very professional as well. Working with Kate is a very smooth operation because she always knows what she wants to do, surprising you too, which is what good musicians always do"

A decade later, Harper and Bush would again collaborate on his 1990 release Once.

=== 1981–89: Recession and repossession ===
Harper's 1982 album Work of Heart was released on Public Records, a newly formed record label Harper created with Mark Thompson (son of English historian, socialist and peace campaigner E.P. Thompson). During this period Harper toured with a band consisting of Tony Franklin on Bass, Bob Wilson of the Steve Gibbons Band, George Jackson on drums and Dave Morris on keyboards. The album was chosen by Derek Jewell of The Sunday Times as "Album of the Year" in 1982, but it did not sell well and the short-lived label went under.

During this period Harper lost his home, a farm in the village of Marden, Herefordshire, to the bank. Of this period Harper stated:

...I can proudly say that I was one of the first casualties of the eighties recession!... It was a chaotic period and one that I don't care to remember that often... There is no doubt in my own mind that the early eighties were the nadir of my life in music".

The original demo version of Work of Heart was later released (in 1984) on a limited edition (830 copies) vinyl release entitled Born in Captivity.

Throughout 1984, Harper toured the United Kingdom with Jimmy Page performing a predominantly acoustic set at folk festivals under various guises such as the MacGregors, and Themselves. In 1985, Whatever Happened to Jugula? was released. The album caused a resurgence of interest in Harper and his music. (Tony Franklin, bass player in Harper's group at this time, later joined Page in the Firm). In April 1984, Harper and Gilmour performed "Short and Sweet" (a song they co-wrote) during Gilmour's three-night run at the Hammersmith Odeon. This version later appeared on the David Gilmour Live 1984 concert film. Harper also provided backing vocals on Gilmour's newly released album, About Face.

On 20 June 1984 Harper performed at the last Stonehenge Free Festival, sharing the bill with Hawkwind and the Enid. The concert was videoed and released as Stonehenge 84.

As a result of his continual touring and the popularity of Whatever Happened to Jugula?, Harper re-signed to EMI and in 1986 released a live album, In Between Every Line (containing recordings from his performances at the Cambridge Folk Festival), and in 1988 the studio album, Descendants of Smith. The renewed relationship between Harper and EMI did not last and from 1985 more of his earlier albums were becoming available on the newly formed Awareness Records label.

1988 also saw the release of Loony on the Bus, a collection of tracks recorded a decade earlier and intended for release in 1977 as Commercial Breaks (with the sub-title, 'doesn't it?'). The original release having been held back because of disputes over funding and content between Harper and EMI. Sales of Loony on the Bus would fund Harper's 1990 release; Once.

=== 1990–99: Science Friction ===
In 1993, Harper established his own record label Science Friction and obtained the rights to all his previously released albums. As a result, from 1994 much of Harper's back catalogue became available on CD once more.

Harper was very productive during the decade, releasing five studio albums: Once (1990), Death or Glory? (1992), Commercial Breaks (1994), The Dream Society (1998), a collection of poetry and spoken word tracks Poems, Speeches, Thoughts and Doodles (1997); two live albums: Unhinged (1993) and Live at Les Cousins (1996; recorded in 1969) and six individual CDs of live concerts and sessions recorded by the BBC (1997). Two official C90 cassette tapes of concerts at the Red Lion in Birmingham (1984 & 1985) were made available from Harper's agency (Acorn Entertainments).

In addition, Harper released a live video, Once (1990), an EP Burn the World (1990), a 4-track CD single Death or Glory? (1992), a limited edition live cassette Born in Captivity II (1992) (featuring cricketer Graeme Fowler and a cricket poem written by Harper: "Three Hundred Words"), a compilation album An Introduction to ..... (1994), and a reissue of Descendants of Smith (his 1988 release) renamed Garden of Uranium (1994).

Once again, Harper collaborated with David Gilmour and Kate Bush on his 1990 release, Once. The album also featured contributions from Nigel Mazlyn Jones, Mark Feltham and Tony Franklin. One of the album tracks, "The Black Cloud of Islam" a song written about Colonel Gaddafi, the Lockerbie bombing, and a despairing castigation of radical Islam, provoked criticism from some of Harper's fans at the time. Whilst religion, Harper's "first and only enemy" has always been a recurring theme in his music, he was 'red-carded by a lot of his 1990 following... who left in substantial numbers'.

In 1992, his second marriage ended and Harper released Death or Glory? an album that (upon its original release) contained a number of songs and spoken word pieces referencing his loss and pain. "She ran off with someone else" said Harper, "a violin player (Nigel Kennedy) I’d been working on an adaptation of Brahms's Violin Concerto with. I was really traumatised by that. Anybody who's been suddenly left like that will know it's very, very traumatic. I managed to come out of it, but it took about five years. It was like a death, a loss, like being told your child's been killed in a war. There's no other way to describe it. When you go through that, it changes your life forever, there's no point in not admitting it. I withdrew, retreated, became an exile".

Throughout the decade, Harper's musical influence began to be recognised by a younger generation of musicians, some of whom covered his songs or invited him to make guest appearances on their albums. In 1995, Harper contributed spoken words on the Tea Party's 1995 album The Edges of Twilight, and appeared on stage for their New Year concert in Montreal. In 1996, Roy recited "Bad Speech" from his album Whatever Happened to Jugula? on Anathema's album Eternity (the album also contains a cover version of "Hope" from the same album). The track "Time" from The Tea Party's 1996 multimedia CD, Alhambra, was sung and co-written by Harper.

Harper contributed his version of Jethro Tull's song, "Up the 'Pool" (from Living in the Past) for the 1996 tribute album, To Cry You a Song – A Collection of Tull Tales, a version Anderson liked so much he began to perform the "forgotten piece" again in concert and later described it as his favourite Jethro Tull cover song.

In 1998, Jethro Tull singer Ian Anderson contributed flute to the song, "These Fifty Years" on Harper's The Dream Society, an album based on emotional, philosophical and actual events in Harper's life. Views of procreation, his mother's continued presence in him and something of his psychological impulses are punctuated by a couple of moments of satire, a love song and a lament, followed by the lengthy "These Fifty years", of which he has said, "In some ways its (anti-organised religion) theme is similar to 'The Same Old Rock', but in many others I think it's stronger". Reportedly, Anderson said that the only reason he originally left Blackpool was because Harper did. Other artists who covered Harper's songs (or songs on his albums) throughout the decade include Dean Carter, Ava Cherry & The Astronettes, Green Crown, The Kitchen Cynics, the Levellers, Roydan Styles, and Pete Townshend. Harper also undertook a short tour of the US, where some performances were supported by Daevid Allen, former Soft Machine and Gong band member.

=== 2000–10: Into the new millennium ===
In 2000, Harper released an almost entirely acoustic album, The Green Man, accompanied by the Tea Party's Jeff Martin on guitar, hurdy-gurdy and numerous other instruments. The following year (2001) Harper celebrated his 60th birthday with a concert performance at London's Royal Festival Hall and was joined by numerous guest artists including; David Bedford, Nick Harper, Jeff Martin and John Renbourn. The concert was recorded and released shortly after as a double CD, Royal Festival Hall Live – 10 June 2001.

In 2003, Harper published The Passions of Great Fortune, a large format book containing all the lyrics to his albums (and singles) to date, it also contained a wealth of photographs and commentary on his songs.

Harper released his second CD single in April 2005; "The Death of God". The 13-minute song, a critique of the war in Iraq, featured guest guitarist Matt Churchill (who also performed live with Harper during this period). A video of the track, intermixing animation with a live performance, is available in four parts on YouTube. 2003 also saw the release of Counter Culture, a double compilation album featuring songs from Harper's 35-year songwriting period. Counter Culture received a five-star review from Uncut magazine. Harper also contributed a recital of "Jabberwocky" for The Wildlife Album, an 18-track compilation CD to benefit the World Wide Fund for Nature and the Ulster Wildlife Trust.

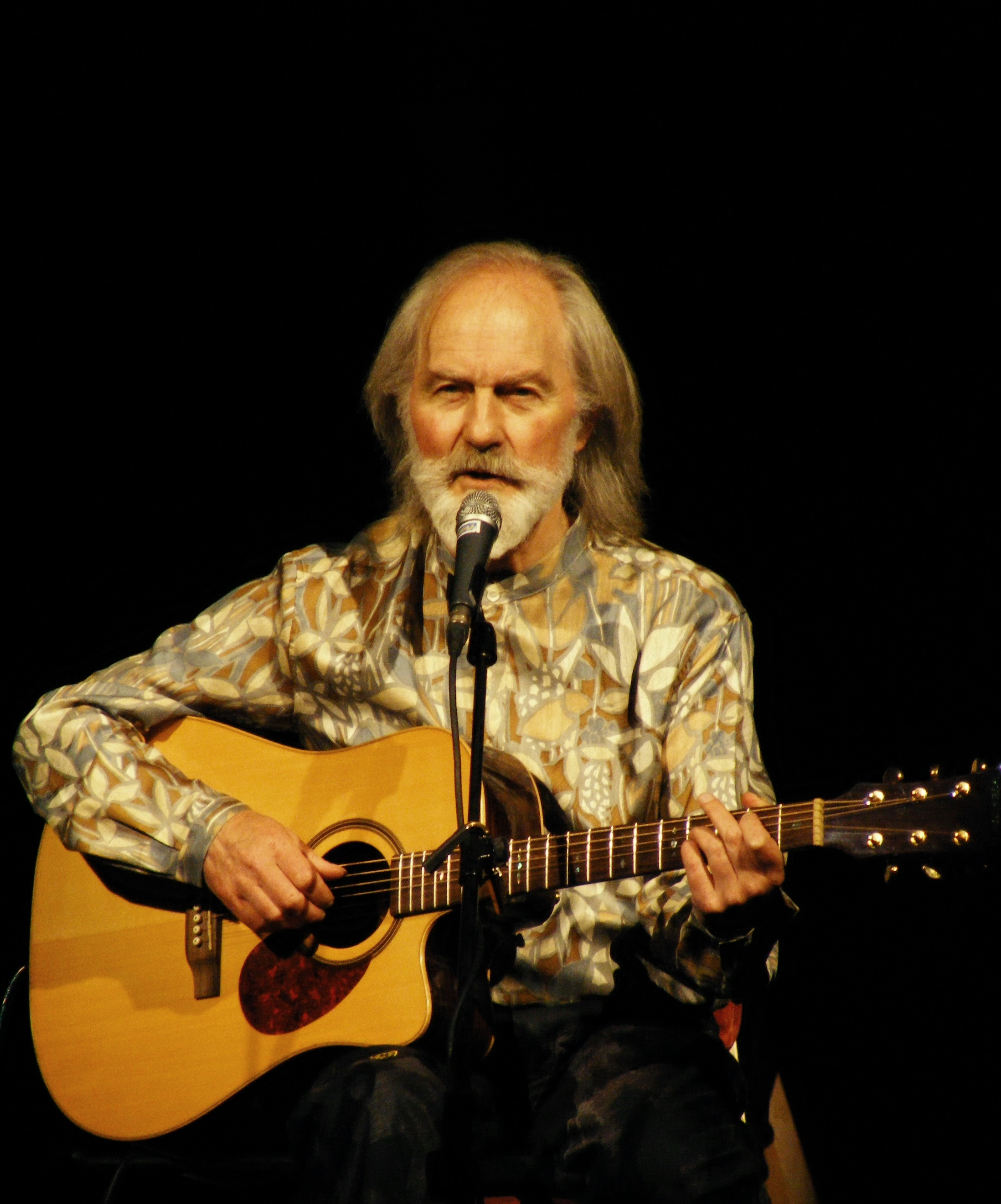
Performing at the Palace Theatre, Manchester, 18 September 2010

2005 saw Harper release his first DVD, Beyond the Door. Composed of live footage recorded in 2004 at Irish folk club "De Barra's" in Clonakilty, Cork and "The Death of God" video. The package also includes an additional 10-track audio CD and received a 4-star review from Mojo, Uncut, and Classic Rock magazine, who made it their "DVD of the month".

In September 2007, Harper supported Californian harpist Joanna Newsom at her Royal Albert Hall performance. Newsom, impressed by Harper's 1971 album Stormcock found it served as an inspiration for her similarly expansive second album, Ys. During his Royal Albert Hall appearance with Newsom, Harper played Stormcock in its entirety. At the time, Harper made an announcement on his website that he was "...taking a break from the live scene... retired from gigging..." and just wanted "...the time and space to write..."

During this period, Harper dedicated his time to collecting and compiling his life's work in various formats. One of the intended projects was to be the making of a documentary DVD to round off this process. However, as of 2016 this remains unreleased.

In 2008, plans were announced for a Roy Harper tribute album. The album, What You Need Is What You Have, The Songs of Roy Harper was being compiled by Laurel Canyon folk singer, musician and producer Jonathan Wilson, and was to feature Chris Robinson (the Black Crowes), Gary Louris (the Jayhawks), Johnathan Rice, Eric D. Johnson (Fruit Bats, the Shins), Benji Hughes, Will Oldham, Andy Cabic, Dawes, Jenny O., Josh Tillman and others. At present, the collection remains unfinished, having been delayed beyond its planned 2009 release date. Six of the tracks can be heard on the project's Myspace page.

In 2010, Newsom once again invited Harper to guest for her on several of her European Tour Dates.

Plans for Harper to star as Rodriguez El Toro in the film Rebel City Rumble were also announced. As of 2016 the project is still categorised as 'in development'.

=== 2011–present: Man and Myth ===
On 2 April 2011, Roy Harper played a concert for a small audience at Metropolis Studios as part of the ITV Legends series. The concert was recorded on video and released on DVD as Classic Rock Legends: Roy Harper – Live in Concert at Metropolis Studios. The package also contains an audio CD of the concert. Through the summer of 2011, Harper made a number of appearances on broadcast media. On 24 July 2011, Harper appeared as the lunchtime guest on the British cricketing radio programme, Test Match Special. During the show Harper was interviewed and also performed "When an Old Cricketer Leaves the Crease". A televised interview followed on BBC Breakfast on 19 September 2011, and Harper was also interviewed by Robert Elms on his BBC London 94.9 show on 20 September 2011. During the show, Harper performed "Another Day" (a song from his 1970 album Flat Baroque and Berserk) live in the studio. A further interview took place on Mike Harding's BBC Radio 2 show on 21 September 2011. On 23 September Harper was interviewed on Later... with Jools Holland. A segment of Harper performing "Commune" (from his 1974 album Valentine) on The Old Grey Whistle Test in 1974 was shown. Harper performed "Another Day", an abbreviated version of "I Hate The White Man" (from his 1970 album Flat Baroque and Berserk) and "The Green Man" (as part of a web exclusive performance).

The media appearances were to promote the release of a new compilation album, Songs of Love and Loss, a compilation of Harper's love songs released as an introduction to the digital release of 19 of Harper's albums for the first time. The digital catalogue was to be released in batches of four over the forthcoming months. The album (and most of Harper's back catalogue) remain available to download on Harper's website in FLAC and MP3 formats.

On 5 November 2011, Harper returned to London's Royal Festival Hall to celebrate his 70th birthday and perform once again with special guests Jonathan Wilson, Nick Harper, Joanna Newsom and Jimmy Page. The performance was described in The Daily Telegraph as "...an evening of devastating musical brilliance..." and by The Guardian as an "...historic concert".

In 2012, the Press Photographers Association of Ireland awarded third place in the Portraits section of their annual competition to a photographic portrait of Harper by photographer Alan Place.

In December 2012, plans to release a new album, Harper's first studio release of newly recorded material for 13 years, were confirmed. The album, Man and Myth, featured contributions from Pete Townshend and Jonathan Wilson, and was released 23 September 2013.

Harper performed live through August 2013, playing at Debarras Folk Club in Clonakilty, West Cork, Ireland (11 August), at the Green Man Festival in Glanusk, Wales (17 August) and at Beautiful Days in Escot Park, Devon (18 August).

During this period Harper was interviewed by Laura Rawlings on her BBC Radio Bristol show on 15 August 2013, and also by Rob Hughes of the Telegraph Online who declared "Roy Harper has spent the past five decades crafting some of the most vivid, ravishingly beautiful music of our times...". Harper also performed at an in-store performance at Rough Trade East, London. A limited number of tickets were available to those who purchased the album in store that day, and the event was also streamed live to a limited number of fans who had pre-ordered the album.

On 25 September, Sky Arts broadcast Roy Harper: Man & Myth – The Documentary. An exclusive documentary film, shot mainly at Harper's home in Ireland, it traced Harper's career and examined his output. Included were interviews with fellow musicians Jimmy Page, Robert Plant and Johnny Marr.

In support of Man and Myth's release, Harper undertook a short, three-date, UK tour, performing at the Royal Festival Hall, London (22 October), the Bridgewater Hall, Manchester (25 October) and the Colston Hall, Bristol (27 October). At each performance he was accompanied by Jonathan Wilson and supported by a string and brass ensemble.

In November 2013, Uncut placed Man & Myth at 6 in their top 50 Albums of 2013. Mojo also placed Man and Myth at 39 in their list of the top 50 Albums of 2013.

In April 2016, to celebrate his 75th birthday, Harper announced four concerts in September with string and brass ensemble, in Birmingham, Manchester, London and Edinburgh. He kicked off the tour at De Barra's pub in Clonakilty, Co. Cork, Ireland.

In March 2019, Harper toured the UK again, with concerts in Birmingham, Bexhill-on-Sea, London (The London Palladium), Liverpool, Gateshead, Leeds and Edinburgh. Once again, the tour began at De Barra's pub in Clonakilty, Co. Cork, Ireland.

Harper performed at the 2025 Glastonbury Festival, and concerts, in which he was joined by Nick Harper, in September in Clonakilty, Manchester, and London; and October in Birmingham.

== Awards ==
HQ was awarded Record of the Year in Portugal in 1975. That year Harper also received a similar award in Finland for the same record.

Work of Heart was named The Sunday Times Album of the Year in 1982.

Harper was given the MOJO Hero Award by the staff of Mojo magazine on 16 June 2005 at the Porchester Hall, London. The award itself was presented by longtime collaborator and friend, Jimmy Page and now hangs upon the wall at De Barras Folk Club in Clonakilty, Ireland.

On 30 January 2013, Harper was awarded a Lifetime Achievement Award at the BBC Radio 2 Folk Awards at the Glasgow Royal Concert Hall.

== Personal life ==
One of Harper's sons, Nick Harper (by Monica "Mocy" Weston), is a singer-songwriter. He has occasionally toured and recorded with his father and appeared as a guitarist on a number of his albums since 1985. Another son, Ben Harper (by English actress Verna Harvey), lives in the US. Songwriter and record producer Felix Howard says Harper is his children's "biological grandfather".

Harper is an atheist.

Following police interviews in February 2013, Harper was charged in November 2013 with ten counts of alleged historical child sexual abuse over a period of several years with an under-age female. After a two-week trial in early 2015, he was found not guilty by a jury of two of the charges with no verdicts on the remaining five, then in November 2015, following a review by the Director of Public Prosecutions, Alison Saunders, the remaining charges were dropped.

== Discography ==
=== Studio albums ===
- 1966 – Sophisticated Beggar
- 1967 – Come Out Fighting Ghengis Smith
- 1969 – Folkjokeopus
- 1970 – Flat Baroque and Berserk
- 1971 – Stormcock
- 1973 – Lifemask
- 1974 – Valentine
- 1975 – HQ
- 1977 – Bullinamingvase
- 1980 – The Unknown Soldier
- 1982 – Work of Heart
- 1984 – Born in Captivity
- 1985 – Whatever Happened to Jugula? (with Jimmy Page)
- 1988 – Descendants of Smith
- 1988 – Loony on the Bus
- 1990 – Once
- 1992 – Death or Glory?
- 1994 – Commercial Breaks (previously unreleased album from 1977; 9 of its 12 tracks are available on Loony on the Bus)
- 1997 – Poems, Speeches, Thoughts and Doodles
- 1998 – The Dream Society
- 2000 – The Green Man
- 2013 – Man and Myth

=== Live albums ===
- 1974 – Flashes from the Archives of Oblivion
- 1986 – In Between Every Line
- 1990 – Live at the Red Lion, Birmingham (1984) (volume I & II limited edition cassette)
- 1990 – Live at the Red Lion, Birmingham (1985) (volume III limited edition cassette)
- 1992 – Born in Captivity II (limited edition cassette)
- 1993 – Unhinged (edited version of Born in Captivity II)
- 1996 – Live at Les Cousins
- 1997 – The BBC Tapes – Volume II (In Concert 1974)
- 1997 – The BBC Tapes – Volume IV (In Concert 1975)
- 1997 – The BBC Tapes – Volume VI (In Concert 1978 with Andy Roberts)
- 2001 – Royal Festival Hall Live – June 10th 2001
- 2005 – Beyond the Door (DVD) (includes CD recorded live in Clonakilty 2004)
- 2011 – Classic Rock Legends: Roy Harper – Live in Concert at Metropolis Studios (DVD + audio CD)

=== Compilation albums ===
- 1978 – Harper 1970–1975
- 1994 – An Introduction to .....
- 1997 – Song of the Ages (3-CD collection of Roy Harper interviews)
- 1997 – The BBC Tapes – Volume I (1969–1973)
- 1997 – The BBC Tapes – Volume III (BBC Sessions 1974)
- 1997 – The BBC Tapes – Volume V (BBC Sessions 1975–1978)
- 2001 – Hats Off (compilation of collaborative tracks)
- 2001 – East of the Sun (compilation of love songs)
- 2002 – Today Is Yesterday (compilation of demo, unreleased and rare material from 1964 to 1967)
- 2005 – Counter Culture (double disc compilation)
- 2007 – From Occident to Orient (compilation and initially, only released in Japan whilst Harper toured there)
- 2011 – Songs of Love and Loss (two volume compilation of love songs)

=== Reissues and remixes ===
- 1977 – The Early Years (reissue of Come Out Fighting Ghengis Smith)
- 1994 – Garden of Uranium (reissue of Descendants of Smith)
- 1998 – Death or Glory? (tracks 1 & 9 remixed)
- 2017 – HQ

=== Singles and EPs ===
- 1966 – "Take Me into Your Eyes" / Pretty Baby"
- 1967 – "Midspring Dithering" / "Zengem"
- 1968 – "Life Goes By" / "You Don't Need Money"
- 1972 – "Bank of the Dead" / "Little Lady"
- 1974 – "(Don't You Think We're) Forever" / "Male Chauvinist Pig Blues" (live)
- 1974 – "Home" (live) / "Home" (studio)
- 1975 – "When an Old Cricketer Leaves the Crease" / "Hallucinating Light" (acoustic)
- 1975 – "Grown-Ups Are Just Silly Children" / "Referendum" ("Legend")
- 1977 – "One of Those Days in England" / "Watford Gap"
- 1977 – "One of Those Days in England" / "Watford Gap" (Germany)
- 1977 – "Sail Away" / "Cherishing the Lonesome"
- 1978 – "When an Old Cricketer Leaves the Crease" / "Home" (studio)
- 1980 – "Playing Games" / "First Thing in the Morning"
- 1980 – "Short and Sweet" / "Water Sports" (live) / "Unknown Soldier" (live)
- 1982 – "No-One Ever Gets Out Alive" / "Casualty" (live at Glastonbury 1982)
- 1983 – "I Still Care" / "Goodbye Ladybird" (acoustic)
- 1985 – "Elizabeth" / "Advertisement" / "I Hate the White Man" (live)" (12" single)
- 1988 – "Laughing Inside" / "Laughing Inside" (acoustic)
- 1990 – Burn the World (2 track CD EP)
- 1992 – Death or Glory? (4-track CD single)
- 2005 – The Death of God (2-track CD single)

=== Collaborations ===
- 1970 – "St. Thomas" (guest lead vocal and lyrics for the Nice and appears on America – The BBC Sessions)
- 1971 – "Ravneferd" (co-written with Lillebjørn Nilsen and appears on the album Tilbake)
- 1975 – "Have a Cigar" (guest lead vocals for Pink Floyd)
- 1978 – "Short and Sweet" (co-written with David Gilmour for his first solo album; Harper's version appears on The Unknown Soldier)
- 1980 – "Breathing", backing vocals on a track on the Kate Bush album Never for Ever.
- 1995 – The Edges of Twilight (spoken word on hidden track for the Tea Party)
- 1995 – "Time" (guest lead vocals for the Tea Party's Alhambra multimedia CD)
- 1996 – "Hope" & "Bad Speech" on Anathema's album Eternity.

=== Downloads ===
- 2005 – The Passions of Great Fortune, Vol. 1 (iTunes Download)

== Videography ==
- 1984 – Stonehenge 84
- 1986 – Live in Your Living Room
- 1990 – Once Live
- 2005 – Beyond the Door (DVD) (includes CD recorded live in Clonakilty 2004)
- 2011 – Classic Rock Legends: Roy Harper – Live in Concert at Metropolis Studios (DVD + audio CD)

== Filmography ==
- 1972 – Made
- 1976 – The Song Remains the Same
- 2009 – Brokeback Cowboy

== Bibliography ==
- 2003 – The Passions of Great Fortune – The Songs Explored (ISBN 0-9545264-0-6)
