= Valentine (Roy Harper album) =

Studio album by Roy Harper
- Released: February 14, 1974
- Recorded: Abbey Road Studios, London
- Genre: Folk rock, progressive folk, folk baroque
- Length: 41:58
- Label: Harvest
- Producer: Peter Jenner, Roy Harper

Roy Harper chronology
Lifemask (1973)	Valentine (1974)	HQ (1975)

Alternative cover
- 1989 Awareness Records release artwork

Alternative cover
- 1994 Science Friction release artwork

Professional ratings
Review scores
Source	Rating
Allmusic	4/5 stars

Valentine is the seventh album by English folk / rock singer-songwriter and guitarist Roy Harper. It was first released in 1974 by Harvest Records.

== History ==
The album contains mainly love songs and was written whilst Harper was writing and recording his previous albums (Stormcock and Lifemask).

Promotional material at the time included full-page advertisements, in magazines such as ZigZag, of Harper wearing only a pair of socks and the words "music to droop your drawers to".

== Tracks on compilation albums ==
A retrospective compilation album A Breath of Fresh Air – A Harvest Records Anthology 1969–1974, was released in 2007. This 3-disc compilation contains the album track "Twelve Hours Of Sunset".

== Album cover ==
The album artwork has altered over the years according to the release label. The original release featured a carbon portrait of Harper erasing himself with a rubber. It was drawn by Joe Petagno whilst working for Hipgnosis The 1989 Awareness Records release featured a portrait of Harper by his then wife. In 1994, the Science Friction release reverted to a portrait of Harper, very similar to the original release, this time drawn by an old friend of Harper's, James Edgar. The most recent release reverts to the album's original Petagno drawn artwork.

== Cover versions ==
David Bedford, who orchestrated the album, composed a 35-minute choral suite, commissioned by the BBC, "Twelve Hours of Sunset", based on Harper's song of the same name, which was given its live premier at the Royal Albert Hall, London on 8 August 1975, by the BBC Singers, BBC Choral Society and BBC Symphony Orchestra, with Simon Lindley on organ, conducted by John Poole, as part of the 75th Proms. Another performance for BBC Radio was on 29 August 1997, on BBC Radio 3, by the Crouch End Festival Chorus and BBC Symphony Orchestra, with Jacques van Steen conducting, as part of a 60th birthday tribute to Bedford, who was also interviewed.

== Track listing ==
All tracks are written by Roy Harper, except "North Country" (Bob Dylan) arranged by Harper.

Side one
No.	Title	Length
1.	"Forbidden Fruit"	2:35
2.	"Male Chauvinist Pig Blues"	3:36
3.	"I'll See You Again"	4:58
4.	"Twelve Hours of Sunset"	5:06
5.	"Acapulco Gold"	4:06

Side two
No.	Title	Length
6.	"Commune"	4:34
7.	"Magic Woman (Liberation Reshuffle)"	6:35
8.	"Che"	3:04
9.	"North Country"	4:35
10.	"Forever"	2:52

1989 CD reissue bonus tracks
No.	Title	Length
11.	"Home" (studio) (from Flashes from the Archives of Oblivion)	3:10
12.	"Too Many Movies" (live) (from Flashes from the Archives of Oblivion)	6:35
13.	"Home" (live) (from Flashes from the Archives of Oblivion)	6:11

== Personnel ==
- Roy Harper – guitar and vocals
- David Bedford – orchestral arrangements
- Steve Broughton – percussion
- Pete Sears – electric bass on "Forbidden Fruit" and "Acapulco Gold"
- Mike Gibbs – brass arrangement on "Male Chauvinist Pig Blues"
- Ronnie Lane – electric bass on "Male Chauvinist Pig Blues"
- Keith Moon – percussion on "Male Chauvinist Pig Blues"
- Jimmy Page – electric guitar on "Male Chauvinist Pig Blues"
- Max Middleton – piano on "Acapulco Gold"
- Marty Simon – percussion on "Acapulco Gold"
- Tim Walker – guitar on "Che"
- Ian Anderson – flute on "Home" (studio)

Technical

- John Leckie – sound engineer
