= Made (1972 film) =

1972 British drama film by John Mackenzie

- Directed by: John Mackenzie
- Written by: Howard Barker
- Based on: No One Was Saved by Howard Barker
- Produced by: Joseph Janni; Edward Joseph
- Starring: Carol White; Roy Harper
- Cinematography: Ernest Day
- Edited by: David Campling
- Music by: John Cameron
- Production companies: International C-Productions & Vic Films
- Distributed by: Anglo-EMI Film Distributors
- Release date: 28 August 1972 (Venice)
- Running time: 101 minutes
- Country: United Kingdom
- Language: English

Made is a 1972 British drama film directed by John Mackenzie and starring Carol White and Roy Harper. A young single mother has a relationship with an insecure rock star. It was written by Howard Barker based on his 1970 play No One Was Saved.

Mackenzie later called it "a mess".

== Plot ==
Valerie is a single mother working as a switchboard operator in Brighton while caring for her infant son as well as her mother, who is suffering from multiple sclerosis. She draws the interest of Mahdav, who is forcefully aggressive, as well as Father Dyson, who is controlling, but she has little time for either of them. She becomes infatuated with the touring musician Mike when she hears him speak about the unnecessary guilt placed on the innocent by religion. The two make love before he leaves to continue touring, making Father Tyson jealous. Valerie's mother, now in a hospital, complains about her condition in order to gain more attention from Valerie.

Valerie leaves her child with June as she visits her mother, only to find that she was exaggerating her complaints. While Valerie is visiting her mother, June gets caught in a conflict between football hooligans and the pram is knocked down some steps, killing Valerie's child.

Valerie finds little solace in those around her until Mike returns, bringing a little of joy. Valerie receives a note that her mother's condition has worsened but she spends the night with Mike instead of going to visit her. Father Tyson arrives and tells her that her mother has died and gets into an argument with Mike. Valerie takes Mike's words to heart and seeks to love who she can when she can instead of requiring anything permanent.

She visits Mahdav and allows him to have sex with her but afterwards he becomes possessive, insisting that he is in love and that she is his wife. A constable separates them and drives her home. Mike, now in Los Angeles, releases a song titled "The Social Casualty" containing lyrics about Valerie's tragedies. Valerie hears the song on the radio and begins to cry.

== Cast ==
- Carol White as Valerie Marshall
- Roy Harper as Mike Preston
- John Castle as Father Dyson
- Margery Mason as Mrs. Marshall
- Doremy Vernon as June
- Sam Dastor as Mahdav
- Richard Vanstone as Ray
- Michael Cashman as Joe
- Brian Croucher as Arthur
- Ray Smith as first Policeman
- Carl Riggas second Policeman
- Bob Harris as interviewer
- Sean Hewitt as Andy
- Peter Jenner as Mike's M.D.
- Len Jones as Barry
- Ivor Butler as Dave
- Ian Ramsey as Kevin
- Colin Pilditch as Jacko
- Colin Daniels as Peter
- Michael Tarn as Charlie
- Jenny Donnison as Janice
- Yvonne McKain as Yvonne
- Sara Clee as Ann
- Babs Jessup as Babs
- Peter Miles as doctor
- Mairhi Russell as night nurse
- Phyllis MacMahon as Irish nurse
- May Warden as patient in hospital
- Ellis Dale as passenger on train
- Michael Standing as young man on train
- Nell Curran as young lady on train
- Paddy Joyce as engineer
- Christopher Taynton as engineer
- Giovanna Renai as waitress

== Original play ==
The movie was based on Howard Barker's stage play No One Was Saved, which was Barker's first work to be professionally staged. He wrote the piece in response to Edward Bond's play Saved which Barker disliked. Barker says he "took up the gang of youths from Saved and used them in No One Was Saved." He was also inspired by the Beatles song "Eleanor Rigby" in which a woman's life is exploited for songwriting purposes.

The play debuted at the Royal Court in November 1970 starring Manfred Mann singer Mike d'Abo as John Lennon, alongside Maureen Lipman (as Eleanor Rigby), Barbara Keough and Diane Fletcher. The Guardian called the production "sadly underpraised".

== Production ==
Film rights were bought by producer Joseph Janni, who set up the movie at EMI Films, then being run by Nat Cohen who had financed several of Janni's earlier films, including Poor Cow. "The story is set in London but it's happening throughout the world," said Janni. "Young people, searching for values, something to believe in. Some look in nearly empty churches, others in the pop world or among Jesus freaks. But who really has the answers?"

Poor Cow had starred Carol White who agreed to play the lead role in Made. White was excited by the film because she had been unhappy with the six films she had made since Poor Cow except for Dulcima. She called the part in Made "the role I had been waiting for" in particular because she identified with the lead character, who was a young mother and had a romantic relationship with a pop star, as White had in real life. White wound up leaving the movie she was filming in America, The Groundstar Conspiracy to return to England to make Made, even though she still had scenes to film (she says the film had gone overschedule). This meant all of White's scenes on Groundstar needed to be reshot.

"It was wrong for her ever to go to Hollywood," said Janni of White. "She was a girl from England spoilt and ruined in America."

Carol White says Janni offered her the choice of Roy Harper or Tony Joe White for the lead and selected Harper because Tony White had the same surname. "One White was enough for any billing," she wrote.

The director was John Mackenzie who had been Ken Loach's floor manager on the television plays Cathy Come Home and Up the Junction which had both starred White; Mackenzie had also just made his feature film directorial debut with Unman, Wittering and Zigo.

White wrote when she met Harper "he was obnoxious, self-opinionated and he seemed to be trying too hard to be eccentric. He acted like an overgrown hippie still longing for Woodstock, and though he preached a philosophy of universal tolerance, he didn’t extend that to the people within immediate reach of his tongue." However as they got to know each other more the relationship improved and the two had a short affair during the making of the movie. White also had affairs with Tony Ciacci and Oliver Reed.

Filming took place in September 1971 in Brighton and London.

Writer Howard Barker called the movie "a disastrous and painful experience which exposed to me the commercial degradation of the industry here, as far as the studios are concerned."

== Soundtrack ==
The film featured excerpts from Harper's songs "The Lord's Prayer", a live excerpt from "Highway Blues", a live session of "Little Lady" and "Bank of the Dead" (a.k.a. "The Social Casualty" and "Valerie's Song") sung with alternative lyrics.

Some of the dialogue from a scene in the film is featured as a sample in the beginning of Saint Etienne's 1993 song Hobart Paving.

== Reception ==
The Daily Telegraph wrote the film "seemed to me a too obviously contrived illustration of the plight of a London working girl." The Evening Standard felt "half the territory has already been worked over too thoroughly in earlier films like Poor Cow" but felt Roy Harper's character was "fresh".

The Guardian called it "one of those awfully sincere British social commentaries that is so pinioned by cliche that most of the worthwhile things it tries to say are drowned in a sea of mediocrity."

The Monthly Film Bulletin wrote: "Attempting to invest social problems with personal immediacy, Made unfortunately short-circuits any possible sympathy by the jejune air of its drama. Its people never seem too far removed from statistics, or at least the conventional assumptions that can be drawn from statistics, while their dramatic environment seems to have been put together from the worst clichés of the old Free Cinema movement. The strains of the hymn "Jerusalem", and the switches in mood from brief moments of circumscribed happiness to the abrupt retribution of crushing guilts, sum up the atmosphere of the film with almost nostalgic banality, leaving the characters hopelessly stranded between outworn conventions and the static distortions of thumbnail sketches from a social worker's casebook."

Variety wrote: "Virtually downbeat all the way, with few if any smiles granted a hangdog Miss White, pic is burdened by unhappy dialogue, a cluttered script into which too many thematics are superficially cramped, and a disjointed construction which jumps around from one predictable development to another."

Sight and Sound wrote "Sociological pertinence and melodramatic decline and fall offset one another to poor advantage."

According to academic Paul Moody, "The film has dated badly, but the theme, of Valerie being buffeted by the various egotistic and selfish men in her life, is an interesting one, and is unusual for British cinema of the period."

Filmink called it "sort of imitation Ken Loach but is absolutely worth watching."
