= Lifemask =

Studio album by Roy Harper
- Released: February 1973
- Recorded: Abbey Road Studios, London
- Genre: Progressive folk, folk baroque, folk rock
- Length: 43:59
- Label: Harvest SHVL 808; Chrysalis CHR 1162; Awareness AWCD1035; Science Friction HUCD005
- Producer: Peter Jenner

Roy Harper chronology
| Stormcock (1971) | Lifemask (1973) | Valentine (1974) |

Professional ratings
Review scores
| Source | Rating |
|---|---|
| Allmusic | 4/5 stars |

Lifemask is the sixth album by English folk / rock singer-songwriter and guitarist Roy Harper, and was first released in 1973 by Harvest Records.

== History ==
Lifemask was written by Harper during a period of illness when HHT, which leads to polycythemia, threatened his health and incapacitated him. With thoughts of life and death upon his mind, side two of the album features a lengthy 23-minute track entitled "The Lord's Prayer" which Harper described as "my last will and testament".

The gatefold album cover is a representation of Harper's 'death mask'. that opens centrally to reveal Harper, very much alive, "fixing the listener with one of his trademarked intense stares." As such it, in fact, shows Harper's 'life mask' as opposed to the death mask it could have been.

Some of the songs were included in the soundtrack for the John Mackenzie-directed film Made which was on general release at the time, the story of a relationship between a young single mother, played by Carol White, and an insecure rock star, 'Mike Preston' played by Harper. An excerpt is taken from "The Lord's Prayer", a live excerpt from "Highway Blues" and a live session of "Little Lady" and "Bank of the Dead" (a.k.a. "The Social Casualty" and "Valerie's Song") sung with alternative lyrics are heard.

The 1987 Awareness Records cassette release of Lifemask (AWT 1007) contained 4 bonus tracks not included on any other Lifemask release.

== Tracks on compilation albums ==
A retrospective compilation album, A Breath of Fresh Air – A Harvest Records Anthology 1969–1974, was released in 2007. This 3 disc compilation contained the album track "South Africa".

This song had previously been released on a 1971 Harvest sampler The Harvest Bag, under the working title "Living Here Alone".

== Track listing ==
All tracks credited to Roy Harper

Side one
| No. | Title | Length |
|---|---|---|
| 1. | "Highway Blues" | 6:34 |
| 2. | "All Ireland" | 2:52 |
| 3. | "Little Lady" | 4:19 |
| 4. | "Bank of the Dead" | 3:13 |
| 5. | "South Africa" | 4:06 |

Side two
| No. | Title | Length |
|---|---|---|
| 6. | "The Lord's Prayer" a) "Poem" b) "Modal Song Parts I to IV" c) "Front Song" d) "Middle Song" e) "End Song" | 22:55 |

1987 cassette bonus tracks
| No. | Title | Original release | Length |
|---|---|---|---|
| 7. | "Ballad of Songwriter" | US release of Folkjokeopus |
| 8. | "Zaney Janey" | US release of Folkjokeopus |
| 9. | "Midspring Dithering" | Single released in 1967 |
| 10. | "Zengem" | B-side of "Midspring Dithering" |

== Singles ==
A 7-inch single was released on the Harvest record label (HAR 5059). This single contained the alternate versions of the album tracks that appeared in the movie Made.

1. Side 1. "Bank Of The Dead"
2. Side 2. "Little Lady"

== Personnel ==
- Roy Harper – guitar, synthesizer, bass, harmonica, bells, and vocals
- Jimmy Page – guitar on "Bank of the Dead" and "The Lord's Prayer"
- Brian Odgers – bass on "Bank of the Dead" and "The Lord's Prayer"
- Ray Warleigh – flute on "The Lord's Prayer"
- Laurie Allan – drums on "Highway Blues"
- Brian Davison – drums on "The Lord's Prayer"
- Steve Broughton – bongos on "The Lord's Prayer"
- Tony Carr – bongos on "The Lord's Prayer" and drums on "Bank of the Dead"

Technical

- John Leckie – sound engineer
- Phil McDonald – sound engineer
- Nick Webb – sound engineer
- Peter Jenner – producer
