= Graeme Fowler =

English cricketer (born 1957)

Personal information
- Full name: Graeme Fowler
- Born: 20 April 1957 (age 69); Accrington, Lancashire, England
- Nickname: Foxy
- Batting: Left-handed
- Bowling: Right arm medium

Domestic team information
- Years: Team
- 1979–1992: Lancashire
- 1992–1994: Durham

Career statistics
Competition	Tests	ODIs	FC	LA
Matches	21	26	292	315
Runs scored	1,307	744	16,663	8,923
Batting average	35.32	31.00	35.60	30.66
100s/50s	3/8	0/4	36/85	9/53
Top score	201	81*	226	136
Balls bowled	18	–	407	6
Wickets	0	–	10	0
Bowling average	–	–	36.60	–
5 wickets in innings	–	–	0	–
10 wickets in match	–	–	0	–
Best bowling	–	–	2/34	–
Catches/stumpings	10/–	4/2	152/5	101/5
- Source: CricInfo, 22 March 2018

Graeme "Foxy" Fowler (born 20 April 1957) is an English former professional cricketer and cricket coach, who played for Lancashire County Cricket Club, England, and later for Durham. He appeared in 21 Test matches and 26 One Day International (ODIs) for England, averaging 35.32 in his Test batting career. After his playing career he founded the centre of excellence scheme at Durham MCCU based at Durham University in 1996, the success of which led the England and Wales Cricket Board (ECB) to establish five more centres; Fowler stepped down as head coach in 2015, after changes in the scheme.

The cricket writer Colin Bateman noted: "a risk-taking left-hander, Fowler rarely bored anyone with his batting".

== Lancashire and England career ==
Fowler was born in Accrington, Lancashire. Educated at Accrington Grammar School and Durham University, Fowler made his debut in first-class cricket in 1979. He usually opened the batting for both county and country, and his most successful opening partnership was with Gehan Mendis between 1986 and 1993.

He made his Test debut in 1982, when sixteen England players were banned for three years for participating in the rebel tour of South Africa during the apartheid era. His highest Test score was 201, made in a nine-hour innings in Madras (now Chennai); this was the first double century by an English cricketer in India. Mike Gatting also scored a double century in the same innings, the first time that two English batsmen had made double centuries in the same Test innings.

However, he lost his place in the England team when the rebel tourists were reinstated, and he had neck trouble. He was not re-selected in Tests for the remainder of his career.

Against New Zealand at The Oval in 1983, Fowler scored his first Test hundred (105 off 303 balls), as Chris Tavare and he became the first England openers to score a century in the same Test innings for twenty three years. His second Test century came against the West Indies at Lord's in 1984.

Fowler's highest One Day International score of 81 not out against Pakistan came during the 1983 World Cup, in which he scored four consecutive half-centuries to help England to the semi-finals, averaging 72.00 for the tournament. He was the first player to achieve the feat of four consecutive fifty-plus scores in a World Cup, but these would be the only occasions that Fowler passed fifty in ODIs.

Against Leicestershire in the same year he scored ten sixes in successive shots, and five fours to make a century, although Leicestershire were employing non-specialist bowlers.

He is the only batsman to score two complete hundreds in a match with the aid of a runner. Playing for Lancashire at Southport in 1982, he strained his thigh while fielding on the first day during Warwickshire's innings of 523–4 declared, but batted without a runner to score 26 not out at stumps. He then scored exactly 100 before lunch on the second day with David Lloyd as his runner. In the second innings, Ian Folley ran for him (and acknowledged the crowd's applause for the century) when Fowler scored 128 not out on the third day. In 1987, Fowler scored an unbeaten century in a Sunday League match against Somerset, despite an injury which forced him to bat with a runner.

In 1992, Fowler suffered amongst others as Lancashire had a widescale clear-out of its playing staff.

== Post-Lancashire career ==
After leaving Lancashire, Fowler played for Durham and coached at their academy, setting up a Cricket School of Excellence in 1996. Among the players he coached were Andrew Strauss and Robin Martin-Jenkins. Since 1987, he has been a cricket broadcaster, sometimes with Test Match Special, and also with Test Match Sofa. He also held the post of Senior Cricket Coach at Durham University until May 2015.

== Later life and health ==
He wrote a book entitled Fox on the Run (ISBN 978-0-670-81560-9) describing a difficult county season, after being dropped from the England side. According to his Lancashire teammate Mike Atherton, Fowler was a constant smoker. Fowler has been open about his depression, including in his 2016 book Absolutely Foxed.

Fowler also made an appearance playing drums on Roy Harpers 1993 live album Unhinged.
