= Flat Baroque and Berserk =

Studio album by Roy Harper
- Released: January 1970
- Recorded: August–September 1969
- Studio: Les Cousins, Abbey Road Studios, London, England
- Genre: Folk, progressive folk, folk baroque
- Length: 55:06
- Label: Harvest SHVL 766; Chrysalis CHR 1160; Science Friction HUCD003
- Producer: Peter Jenner

Roy Harper chronology
Folkjokeopus (1969)	Flat Baroque and Berserk (1970)	Stormcock (1971)

Professional ratings
Review scores
Source	Rating
Allmusic	3.0/5 stars

Flat Baroque and Berserk is the fourth studio album by the English folk musician Roy Harper. It was released in January 1970 through Harvest Records.

== History ==
Flat Baroque and Berserk was the first of Roy Harper's recordings to enter the charts, reaching number 20 in the UK album chart in January 1970. Produced by Peter Jenner and recorded at Abbey Road Studios, it was also the first of eight albums recorded for EMI's Harvest label. Harper has said of the album, "for the first time in my recording career, proper care and attention was paid to the presentation of the song."

The album contains some of Harper's best-known songs. "I Hate the White Man", in particular, is noted for its uncompromising lyrics, and Allmusic described the song as

certainly one of his most notable (and notorious) compositions, a spew of lilting verbiage that's hard to peg. It could be irony, it could be ironic self-hatred, it could be muddled reflections on the chaos that is the modern world, or it could be a combination of all of them.

Harper himself described the song as

a testament to my lifelong devotion to espousing equal rights for all humans. I have long since wondered about the wisdom of stating that you have more than the capacity to hate your own race for it's [sic] misdemeanors, but as a polemic it has been both an effective tool and somewhere of a place to stand.

Following the murder of George Floyd by police officer Derek Chauvin in May 2020, Harper wrote a blog post breaking down the inspiration for "I Hate the White Man" and why he believes the song remains relevant.

"How Does it Feel" is used in the closing scene of episode 3 of the third season of The Handmaid's Tale.

The album also features "Another Day", a song expressing regret for lost love. The lyrics are written from the point of view of a man looking back with sorrow upon a missed chance that might have led him to the love he has searched for. The song was covered as a duet by Kate Bush and Peter Gabriel in her 1979 television special, and by This Mortal Coil on their 1984 album It'll End in Tears. Kate Bush's cover led to two collaborations between the two artists in 1980: Harper provided backing vocals on Bush's song "Breathing", and they performed a duet on the track "You" from Harper's The Unknown Soldier album.

A studio conversation with Tony Visconti is heard before "Tom Tiddler's Ground", on which he plays recorder.

The album closes with one of Harper's most rock-based tracks, "Hell's Angels", on which backing is provided by progressive rock band The Nice (with Keith Emerson on keyboards). Notably, the song features an unusual combination of acoustic guitar played through a wah-wah pedal.

Two of the album's tracks "I Hate the White Man" ("Den hvite mann") and "Don't You Grieve" ("Kjære ikke gråt") were later covered by Norwegian singer Finn Kalvik whom Harper had met and performed with in Oslo in 1970.

== Tracks on compilation albums ==
One of the album tracks, "Song of the Ages" appeared on the 1970 Harvest Records sampler album, Picnic – A Breath of Fresh Air. However, the inclusion of the previously unreleased Pink Floyd song, "Embryo", considered unfinished by the band and used without their permission, saw the album's withdrawal from sale.

A similarly entitled retrospective compilation album, A Breath of Fresh Air – A Harvest Records Anthology 1969–1974, was released in 2007. This three-disc compilation contained only three tracks in common with its precursor. Harper's "Song of the Ages" was dropped in favour of "Francesca" and "Don't You Grieve", and two other Harper tracks were also included; "South Africa" from his 1973 release Lifemask and "Twelve Hours Of Sunset" from his following 1974 album Valentine.

== Track listing ==
All tracks written by Roy Harper; however, on the original 1970 release, all tracks except "I Hate the White Man", "Francesca" and "Hell's Angels" were credited to H. Ash, an alias of Harper.

Side one
No.	Title	Length
1.	"Don't You Grieve"	5:43
2.	"I Hate the White Man"	8:03
3.	"Feeling All the Saturday"	1:56
4.	"How Does It Feel?"	6:29
5.	"Goodbye"	5:42

Side two
No.	Title	Length
6.	"Another Day"	2:57
7.	"Davey"	1:30
8.	"East of the Sun"	3:02
9.	"Tom Tiddler's Ground"	6:48
10.	"Francesca"	1:19
11.	"Song of the Ages"	3:52
12.	"Hell's Angels"	7:46

== Personnel ==
- Roy Harper – vocals, acoustic guitar, electric guitar on "Hell's Angels"
- David Bedford – arrangements
- Skaila Kanga – harp on "Song of the Ages"
- Tony Visconti – recorder on "Tom Tiddler's Ground"
- Keith Emerson – keyboards on "Hell's Angels"
- Lee Jackson – bass guitar on "Hell's Angels"
- Brian Davison – drums on "Hell's Angels"

Technical

- Phil McDonald, Neil Richmond – sound engineer
- Lon Goddard – cover design
- John McKenzie – photography
