= Death or Glory? (album) =

Studio album by Roy Harper
- Released: 1992
- Genre: Rock
- Length: 63:32
- Label: Awareness AWCD 1037, Science Friction HUCD012
- Producer: Roy Harper

Roy Harper chronology
Once (1990)	Death or Glory? (1992)	Commercial Breaks (1994)

Alternative cover
- 1994 reissue

Alternative cover
- 1998 reissue

Professional ratings
Review scores
Source	Rating
Allmusic	link

Death or Glory? is the 17th studio album by Roy Harper and was released in 1992 following the end of his nine-year relationship.

== History ==
Harper's second marriage ended in 1992. A number of songs and spoken word tracks on Death or Glory? reflected Harper's emotional state at the time (though some were omitted from following re-releases). "She ran off with someone else," said Harper, "a violin player (Nigel Kennedy) I’d been working on an adaptation of Brahms Violin Concerto with. I was really traumatised by that. Anybody who’s been suddenly left like that will know it’s very, very traumatic. I managed to come out of it, but it took about five years. It was like a death, a loss, like being told your child’s been killed in a war. There’s no other way to describe it. When you go through that, it changes your life forever, there’s no point in not admitting it. I withdrew, retreated, became an exile".

The overseas release of the original album contained a personal advertisement from the recently separated Harper seeking a companion.

The song "Evening Star" was written for (and performed at) the wedding of Robert Plant's daughter, Carmen, to Charlie Jones on 18 May 1991.

== Singles ==
CD single cover

A four-track CD single was released at the time of the album's release. The single contained the first three album tracks and an additional track, "The Methane Zone". Subsequent album re-releases now include this track.

1. "Death or Glory?"
2. "The War Came Home Tonight"
3. "Duty"
4. "The Methane Zone"

== Re-releases ==
In 1994 the album was reissued with different artwork, and a slightly altered track listing. In 1998 it was reissued again with another (third) album cover. This version was remastered, and two tracks ("Death or Glory?" and "The Fourth World") were partially re-recorded.

== Track listing ==
All tracks composed by Roy Harper

1. Death or Glory? (5:06)
2. The War Came Home Tonight (4:20)
3. Duty (1:28)
4. Waiting for Godot (Part Zed) (3:30)
5. Next to Me (3:16)
6. Man Kind (1:02)
7. The Tallest Tree (4:52)
8. Miles Remains (8:52)
9. The Fourth World (7:22)
10. Why? (0:45)
11. Evening Star (6:05)
12. Cardboard City (3:24)
13. One More Tomorrow (5:21)
14. The Plough (2:16)
15. On Summer Day (5:39)
16. If I Can (0:24)

=== 1994 & 1998 CD reissues ===
1. "Death or Glory"
2. "The War Came Home Tonight"
3. "Duty"
4. "Waiting For Godot (Part Zed)"
5. "Next To Me"
6. "The Methane Zone"
7. "The Tallest Tree"
8. "Miles Remain"
9. "The Fourth World"
10. "Why?"
11. "Evening Star"
12. "Cardboard City"
13. "One More Tomorrow"
14. "On Summer Day"

== Personnel ==
- Roy Harper - guitar, vocals
- Nick Harper - guitar
- Tony Franklin - bass, keyboards
- Steve Barnard - drums
- Kate Bush - vocals
- Michael Anthony - keyboards
- Gerry Fehiley - drums
- Colm O'Sullivan - keyboards
- Cara Mastrey - background vocals
- Ray Barron - bouzouki
