= Bloomsbury Theatre =

Theatre in London, England

- Collegiate Theatre; Bloomsbury Theatre
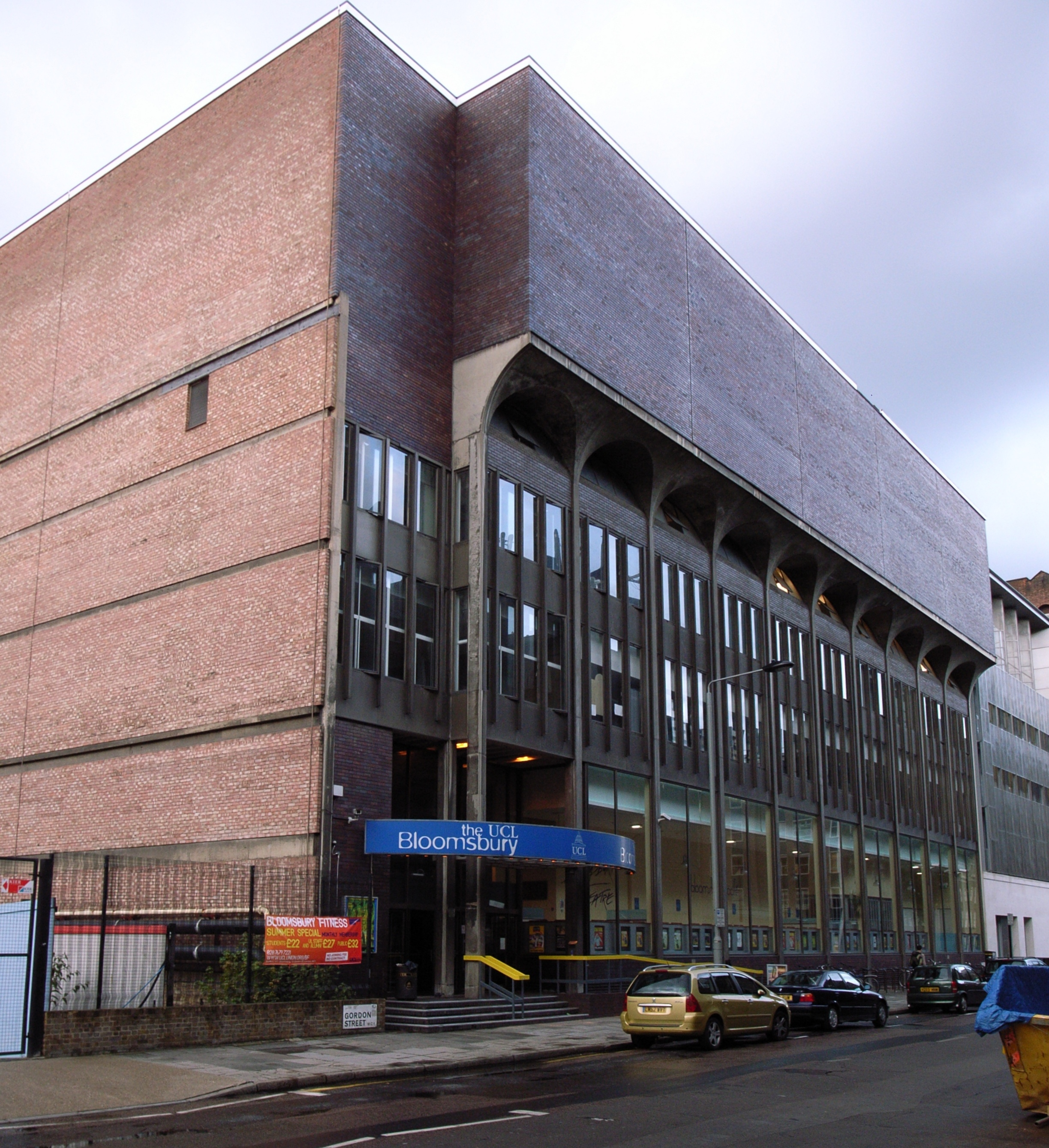
- Bloomsbury Theatre
- Interactive map of Bloomsbury Theatre
- Address: Gordon Street; London, WC1; United Kingdom
- Coordinates: 51°31′30″N 00°07′57″W
- Owner: University College London
- Capacity: 541 seats
- Production: Visiting performances
- Public transit: Euston; Euston Square; Euston

Construction
- Opened: 1968; 58 years ago

Website
- ucl.ac.uk/bloomsbury-theatre

The Bloomsbury Theatre is a theatre located on Gordon Street in Bloomsbury, within the London Borough of Camden. It is owned by University College London. The Theatre has a seating capacity of 545 and offers a professional programme of innovative music, drama, comedy and dance throughout the year. It also provides a space for student-led productions.

Funded by a UGC grant and a considerable private donation, the theatre was opened in 1968 under the name Collegiate Theatre and was renamed the Bloomsbury Theatre in 1982. From 2001 to 2008, the theatre was known as The UCL Bloomsbury, to emphasise its connection to UCL, which uses the venue for student productions for 12 weeks a year. The Bloomsbury Theatre recently returned to the logo designed by cartoonist Gerald Scarfe, which had been using for nearly twenty years until 2001. The main theatre was closed for renovation in 2015 and reopened in February 2019.

The basement below the Theatre holds the Bloomsbury Studio, a black box performance space with a flexible seating configuration and capacity of up to 70.

The theatre building also provides access to the UCL Union Fitness Centre and the Clubs and Societies Centre on the 2nd, 3rd and 4th floors. A UCL Union-run café is located on the Ground Floor. Access to the Main UCL Wilkins Building (Octagon Building) and the UCL Refectory is possible through the theatre building.

Many notable artists have performed at the theatre, including UCL alumnus Ricky Gervais who performed two of his standup shows there, both of which were filmed for release on DVD and was the venue for Crusader Norman Housley come-back lecture series: Contesting the Crusades, which he developed into a popular history book.

In July 1982, the Bloomsbury Theatre premiered the English language performance of Pirandello's Liola, by Internationalist Theatre, directed by UCL alumnus Fabio Perselli, who also did the translation.

From 2001, the theatre provided a residency for the New London Orchestra and hosted Robin Ince's "Nine Lessons and Carols for Godless People" for several years.

May 2006 Paul Simon performed a concert which was recorded for the BBC Radio 2

January 2008 Adele performed her first solo concert which included a full performance of her debut album 19 which topped No.1 in the UK charts in the same week.

Christopher Nolan and Emma Thomas met while being members of UCL Film Society and credit the Bloomsbury theatre as being key to developing their careers in directing and producing.
