= Derek Jewell =

British writer, broadcaster and music critic

Derek Jewell (1927 – 21 November 1985) was a British journalist, newspaper executive, broadcaster and music critic. A music critic for the London Sunday Times for twenty-three years from 1963, Jewell wrote extensively about jazz, and also introduced British audiences to avant garde jazz, rock and improvisational music, especially through live performances on his BBC Radio 3 show Sounds Interesting.

== Career ==
He was born in London and educated at Latymer School, followed by Wadham College, Oxford. In 1950 he became a graduate trainee on the Liverpool Daily Post. By 1959 he was assistant editor in 1959, writing on sport and popular music. In 1962 he joined the Sunday Times as personal assistant to the editor, and was later assistant editor, executive editor – Sunday Times Magazine, deputy editor and finally publishing director, besides (from 1963) writing on jazz and pop/rock music.

== Writer ==
In addition to producing columns of music criticism for the Sunday Times (he also wrote periodically for the now-defunct Illustrated London News), Jewell was the author of a number of books about popular music including The Popular Voice (1980, a selection from his articles), Duke – A Portrait of Duke Ellington (1977), and Frank Sinatra (co-written with George Perry, 1985). He collaborated with his wife, Elizabeth Jewell, on a series of Sunday Times crossword collections and wrote two novels, Come In Number One, Your Time Is Up (1971) and Sellout (1973).

== Broadcaster ==
Created in 1967, BBC Radio 3 was dedicated primarily to broadcasting live and recorded performances of classical music. Derek Jewell hosted what was known as the only "rock" show on the radio station, the weekly Sounds Interesting. The show was broadcast each Saturday late afternoon with its theme music Soul Saga (the sound of the buffalo soldier) recorded by Quincy Jones. In addition to rock music, Jewell hosted performers playing a wide range of experimental and even improvisational music. In 1975 he interviewed Rick Wakeman.
