= Whatever Happened to Jugula? =

Studio album by Roy Harper & Jimmy Page
- Released: 4 March 1985
- Recorded: Clapham; Hereford; Berkshire; Mamaraneck, West Cork; Boilerhouse Studios, Lytham
- Genre: Rock; folk rock; progressive folk
- Length: 45:25
- Label: Beggars Banquet BEGA 60, Science Friction HUCD032
- Producer: Roy Harper

Roy Harper chronology
Born in Captivity (1984)	Whatever Happened to Jugula? (1985)	Descendants of Smith (1988)

Jimmy Page chronology
Death Wish II (1982)	Whatever Happened to Jugula? (1985)	The Firm (1985)

Professional ratings
Review scores
Source	Rating
AllMusic	3/5 stars

Whatever Happened to Jugula? is the thirteenth studio album by the English folk / rock singer-songwriter and guitarist Roy Harper. Harper's friend, guitarist Jimmy Page also plays on the album. The album was first released on 4 March 1985, through Beggars Banquet Records.

== History ==
With a working title of "Rizla", Whatever Happened to Jugula? was released on the Beggars Banquet label (BBL60) and reached the UK Top 20. It is recorded in a fresh and spontaneous manner, often with only the unique sound of Ovation guitars and vocals. Occasionally, the arrangements are filled with synthesizer and electric guitar. The album's cover art is based on an unravelled orange Rizla pack.

The album was partially recorded in the basement of an old school friend's house in Lytham. Boiler House Studios were run by Tony Beck who had encouraged Harper to renew his acquaintance with Jimmy Page. Together, Harper and Page recorded at Page's house on an eight track Teac reel to reel borrowed from Pete Townshend. Page also visited Lytham and recordings were also made there.

Jugula exposed Harper to a new and wider audience through this connection to Jimmy Page, their appearances at the Cambridge Folk Festival in 1984, the album tour (of which four performances were filmed and exist on archive footage) and a 15-minute televised interview by Mark Ellen on the Old Grey Whistle Test (16 November 1984). The interview featured Harper and Page playing acoustic guitars on the side of Side Pike in the English Lake District, a somewhat different and unusual interview for the time. Songs played included "Hangman" and a section from "The Same Old Rock".

The album was the fifth that Harper and Page had worked on, but the first they had made together entirely. Page's guitar playing is quite evident throughout the album, and is a natural complement to Harper's unique guitar work. The first track, "Nineteen Forty-Eightish", a reference to George Orwell's Nineteen Eighty-Four, crescendos with lead guitar by Page. Other tracks include "Hangman", a song that expresses the feelings of an innocent man condemned to die and "Frozen Moment", a song played entirely in the chord of C♯.

The title for Jugula came from playing Trivial Pursuit, in order to explain to everyone how they should go about answering the questions as straight and honestly as possible I'd say, "Go for the jugular". It was going to be Harper & Page for a while, but that's like selling Jimmy's name, then it went to 1214 which is the year that the Magna Carta was signed... but that was a bit esoteric. So one day we were talking and "jugula" came up, so I phoned the artist and they'd designed up to the Whatever happened to... bit so I said leave it there and put Jugula at the end.

The track "Hope" originated as a tune written by David Gilmour for his second solo album About Face. He asked Pete Townshend to supply lyrics, but felt that he couldn't relate to them, so Townshend used the song instead entitling it "White City Fighting", with Gilmour playing guitar, on his album White City: A Novel. Gilmour sent the same tune to Harper, whose lyrics had the same effect on Gilmour. Harper used the result, "Hope", which has a markedly slower tempo, on this album, with his son Nick Harper (who was 16 years old at the time), playing lead guitar.

"Hangman" is about the feelings of an innocent man condemned to be executed for a crime he did not commit. Of capital punishment Harper stated:

That people can even think about bringing back the death penalty is profane. Yes, some people deserve to be locked up forever, but they're the responsibility of society. They are part of what we are. We have to be able to civilise, to teach with heart, and to keep the savage in ourselves under scrutiny rather than allowing the mob in us to rule.

=== Reissues ===
In 1999, the album was reissued on Harper's own Science Friction label and retitled Jugula, the cover art being altered accordingly. In 2019, the album was remastered and reissued, maintaining the later 1999 artwork.

== Singles ==
12" Single cover

"Elizabeth", a song that originally appeared on Harper's 1984 release Born in Captivity, was re-recorded and released as a 12" single. Again the artwork was based on an unfolded Rizla packet, this time in green. The 12" was released on Beggars Banquet Records (BEG 131T).

1. Side A –
  1. "Elizabeth"
2. Side B –
  1. "Advertisement (Another Intentional Irrelevant Suicide)"
  2. "I Hate The White Man" (Live) (Recorded at Poynton, 18 October 1984)

== Cover version ==
A cover version of "Hope" (with "Bad Speech" read by Harper as an introduction) can be found on the album Eternity by the Liverpudlian band Anathema.

== Track listing ==
All tracks are written by Roy Harper except where noted.

Side one
No.	Title	Writer(s)	Length
1.	"Nineteen Forty-Eightish"		9:45
2.	"Bad Speech"		1:17
3.	"Hope"	Harper, David Gilmour	4:31
4.	"Hangman"		7:09

Side two
No.	Title	Length
1.	"Elizabeth"	6:39
2.	"Frozen Moment"	3:18
3.	"Twentieth Century Man"	4:27
4.	"Advertisement (Another Intentional Irrelevant Suicide)"	8:19

== Personnel ==
- Roy Harper – vocals, acoustic and electric guitars, percussion
- Jimmy Page – acoustic and electric guitars
- Tony Franklin – bass guitar
- Nik Green – keyboards, engineering
- Ronnie Brambles – drums
- Steve Broughton – drums
- Preston Heyman – drums
- Nick Harper – semi-acoustic guitar

== Charts ==
Chart performance for Whatever Happened to Jugula?
Chart (1985)	Peak position
UK Albums (OCC)	44
US Billboard 200	60
