= Bullinamingvase =

Studio album by Roy Harper
- Released: 11 February 1977
- Recorded: Hereford, England
- Genre: Folk rock, progressive folk, folk baroque
- Length: 44:22
- Label: Harvest SHSP 4060; Chrysalis CHR 1138; Science Friction HUCD021
- Producer: Peter Jenner, John Leckie

Roy Harper chronology
HQ (1975)	Bullinamingvase (1977)	The Unknown Soldier (1980)

Professional ratings
Review scores
Source	Rating
AllMusic	4/5 stars

Bullinamingvase (wordplay on "Bull in a Ming vase") is the ninth studio album by English folk / rock singer-songwriter and guitarist Roy Harper. It was first released in 1977 by Harvest Records. In the United States the album was released as One of Those Days in England.

== History ==
The album features a mix of musicians and instruments, including the Vauld Symphony Orchestra (named after the Marden, Herefordshire farm Harper owned and recorded in at the time). The CD release (Science Friction HUCD021) has been remastered with SNS 20-bit digital supermapping.

"Naked Flame" is modelled on the traditional Lady Franklin's Lament, in much the same way as "Bob Dylan's Dream" (from The Freewheelin' Bob Dylan) used the same source.

=== One of Those Days in England (Parts 2–10) ===
One of the album's highlights is the epic, 19-minute, "One Of Those Days In England (Parts 2–10)" (originally side 2 of the album on vinyl). Comprising several musical movements, the song is a collection of reminiscences from both a personal and cultural perspective. Harper sings of "Britannica and all those who sail in her, especially those with Albion's cultural heritage claws...", and refers to the Alfred Jewel, the legend of The Sword in the Lake, Avalon, signing on for the dole, Captain Kirk, Linda Lovelace, Stanley Matthews, and The Blitz.

=== Watford Gap ===
Originally the album contained the song "Watford Gap" which contained somewhat disparaging lyrics concerning the Watford Gap service station, a motorway service area situated between junctions 16 and 17 of the M1 motorway, near Watford Gap, in Northamptonshire, England.

Just about a mile from where the motorways all merge
You can view the national edifice, a monumental splurge
It's the lonesome traveller's rotgut or bacteria's revenge
The great plastic spectacular descendant of Stonehenge
And the people come to worship on their death-defying wheels
Fancy-dressed as shovels for their death-defying meals

It's the Watford Gap, Watford Gap
A plate of grease and a load of crap

Harper claimed the food was "junk, absolute junk. I tried to get the media food commentators of the day interested, but none of them would help me because they were all kind of bought off in some way, they were in the pockets of the corporations. I got a reply from Bernard Levin – he agreed with me but wouldn't go public about it". Subsequent pressings omitted the song at the behest of an EMI board member who was (also) a non-executive director of Blue Boar (the owners of the service station). Under duress, Harper replaced the controversial track with "Breakfast With You", a song he himself allegedly described as "pap". In 1996, "Watford Gap" was finally restored to the re-issued CD, with "Breakfast With You" now the closing track.

== Track listing ==
All compositions credited to Roy Harper

=== Side one ===
1. "One of Those Days in England Part 1" – 3:25
2. "These Last Days" – 4:26
3. "Cherishing the Lonesome" – 5:54
4. "Naked Flame" – 5:06
5. "Watford Gap" – 3:22

=== Side two ===
1. "One of Those Days in England Parts 2–10" – 19:27

== 1977 Harvest reprint ==
=== Side one ===
1. "One of Those Days in England" – 3:25
2. "These Last Days" – 4:26
3. "Cherishing the Lonesome" – 5:54
4. "Naked Flame" – 5:06
5. "Breakfast With You" – 2:42

=== Side two ===
1. "One of Those Days in England (Parts 2–10)" – 19:27

== 1996 CD reissue ==
1. "One of Those Days in England" – 3:25
2. "These Last Days" – 4:26
3. "Cherishing the Lonesome" – 5:54
4. "Naked Flame" – 5:06
5. "Watford Gap" – 3:22
6. "One of Those Days in England (Parts 2–10)" – 19:27
7. "Breakfast With You" – 2:42

== Promotional and single releases ==
With the re-print of Bullinamingvase, Harvest Records included a promo "single".

=== Promo release (SPSR 407) ===
- Side 1. – "Referendum (Legend)" / "Another Day" (live version)
- Side 2.– "Tom Tiddler's Ground"

=== Promo release (SPSR 408) ===
- Side 1. – "One of Those Days in England" / "Watford Gap"
- Side 2. – "Naked Flame" / "Mrs Space" – (extract from "One of Those Days in England")

Two singles from the album were released on the Harvest label. One included a track from Harper's proposed follow up album, Commercial Breaks. This album was not released in its entirety until 1994.

=== Single release March 1977 (HAR 5120) ===
- Side 1. – "One of Those Days in England"
- Side 2. – "Watford Gap"

=== Single release November 1977 (HAR 5140) ===
- Side 1. – "Sail Away" – "Taken from the New LP Commercial Breaks"
- Side 2. – "Cherishing The Lonesome" – "Taken from the LP Bullinamingvase"

== Personnel ==
- Roy Harper – vocals and guitars
- John Halsey – drums
- Dave Lawson – keyboards & effects
- Henry McCullough – guitars
- Andy Roberts – guitars & backing vocals
- David C. Drill – bass guitar

with

- Jimmy McCulloch – guitars
- B.J. Cole – pedal steel guitar
- Percy Jones – bass
- Alvin Lee – guitar on "One of Those Days in England"
- Ronnie Lane – bass on "One of Those Days in England"
- Dave Cochran – bass
- Herbie Flowers – bass
- Max Middleton – keyboards
- Steve Broughton – drums
- Skaila Kanga – harp
- Linda McCartney – backing vocals on "One of Those Days in England"
- Paul McCartney – backing vocals on "One of Those Days in England"
- Dave Plowman – euphonium, trombone
- The Vauld Symphony Orchestra – orchestra; arranged by Roy Harper, conducted by Dave Lawson

Technical

- John Leckie – sound engineer
- Mark Vigars – sound engineer
