= Stormcock (album) =

Studio album by Roy Harper
- Released: May 1971
- Recorded: 1 July – 20 December 1970
- Studio: Abbey Road Studios, London
- Genre: Progressive folk; baroque folk
- Length: 41:25
- Label: Harvest
- Producer: Peter Jenner

Roy Harper chronology
| Flat Baroque and Berserk (1970) | Stormcock (1971) | Lifemask (1973) |

Professional ratings
Review scores
| Source | Rating |
|---|---|
| AllMusic | 4.5/5 stars |

Stormcock is the fifth studio album by English folk/rock singer-songwriter and guitarist Roy Harper. First released in May 1971 by Harvest Records, it is widely considered his best record.

== History ==
Harper was inspired by a trip to, and time spent in, Big Sur, California. "Me and My Woman" is a love song backed by David Bedford's orchestral arrangements (Bedford would also collaborate on some of Harper's later releases). "Hors d'Oeuvres" was inspired by the fate of Caryl Chessman who spent nearly 12 years on death row – at the time the longest ever in the United States – before being executed in a gas chamber in May 1960. "One Man Rock and Roll Band" is a critique on the pointlessness of violence.

"The Same Old Rock" is an attack on government, the history of war, and organized religion featuring guitar work and a solo by Jimmy Page.

The album's four extended songs showcase Harper's talents, both as a songwriter and guitarist. But, Stormcock "...epitomized a hybrid genre that had no exclusive purveyors save Harper — epic progressive acoustic."

At the time, the album was not particularly well promoted by Harper's record label. Harper later stated:

They hated Stormcock. No singles. No way of promoting it on the radio. They said there wasn't any money to market it. Stormcock dribbled out.

Nonetheless, Stormcock would remain a favourite album of critics and Harper's fans. The Times commented on the album in 2011, calling it a, "masterpiece of eccentricity". In October 2013, NME placed Stormcock at number 377 in their list of "The 500 Greatest Albums of All Time".

Although Jimmy Page performs on the album, he was credited as "S. Flavius Mercurius" for contractual reasons.

=== Reissue ===
The album was digitally remastered in 2007 by Science Friction. The package included a 20-page case-bound booklet with new pictures, prose and poetry, and Page's name was added to the album's credits.

== Influence ==
In 2006, 35 years after its initial release, Johnny Marr of English alternative rock band The Smiths said:

If ever there was a secret weapon of a record it would be Stormcock. I don't know why it's such a secret. If anyone thinks it might be a collection of lovely songs by some twee old folkie then they'd be mistaken. It's intense and beautiful and clever: [Bowie's] Hunky Dory's big, badder brother.

Joanna Newsom cited Stormcock as an influence upon her 2006 release Ys, which likewise contains lengthy songs with dense orchestral arrangements, and in 2011, Robin Pecknold of folk band Fleet Foxes stated that he took inspiration from Stormcock when recording Fleet Foxes' second album Helplessness Blues.

== Title ==
The album's title, Stormcock, is an old English name for the Mistle thrush (Turdus viscivorus). The male of the species is most vocal in the early morning and has a tendency to sing after, and sometimes during, wet and windy weather which led to the name 'Stormcock'. Harper has an appreciation of birdlife and has made reference to many birds in his songs.

== Track listing ==
All tracks are written by Roy Harper.

Side One
| No. | Title | Length |
|---|---|---|
| 1. | "Hors d'Oeuvres" | 8:37 |
| 2. | "The Same Old Rock" | 12:24 |

Side Two
| No. | Title | Length |
|---|---|---|
| 3. | "One Man Rock and Roll Band" | 7:23 |
| 4. | "Me and My Woman" | 13:01 |

== Personnel ==
- Roy Harper – vocals, 6- and 12-string acoustic guitars, piano
- David Bedford – Hammond organ, orchestral arrangements
- Jimmy Page (credited as "S. Flavius Mercurius") – acoustic guitar on "The Same Old Rock"

Technical

- John Barrett – sound engineer
- Peter Bown – sound engineer
- Richard Imrie – photography
- Peter Jenner – producer
- John Leckie – sound engineer
- Phil McDonald – sound engineer
- Alan Parsons – sound engineer
- Nick Webb – sound engineer
