= Descendants of Smith =

Studio album by Roy Harper
- Released: March 1988
- Recorded: Lincolnshire, England
- Genre: Rock
- Length: 44:03
- Label: EMI CD-EMC 3524
- Producer: Roy Harper

Roy Harper chronology
Whatever Happened to Jugula? (1985)	Descendants of Smith (1988)	Loony on the Bus (1988)

Professional ratings
Review scores
Source	Rating
Allmusic	3/5 stars

Descendants of Smith is the 14th studio album by Roy Harper, released in 1988. In 1994 it was re-issued under the title, Garden of Uranium with an identical track list but new cover artwork.

== History ==
As a publicity stunt on the music media, whom Harper thought did not give him or his music fair or considered reviews, Harper sent out 3 promo versions of his single "Laughing Inside" using anagrams of his own name; 'Per Yarroh' a Norwegian classical avant garde composer, 'Rory Phare' a lounge lizard and trendy art designer and 'Harry Rope' a Hells Angel. Music magazines were sent the 7" single, along with an accompanying fake biography describing the artist they were being introduced to.

An employee from Sounds interviewed Per Yarroh and apparently fell for the publicity stunt "hook, line and sinker". When interviewed, Harper elaborated:

as she wrote up the interview in the office, an old timer heard the record and asked what she was doing on Roy Harper? She'd loved the record originally, but then turned right around and wrote the most vindictive piece about me. I also had loads of radio lined up, but as soon as they found out it was me they all cancelled. Being called Roy Harper is the biggest artistic drawback in my career."

Cover art of Garden of Uranium

== Track listing ==
All tracks credited to Roy Harper, except Laughing Inside - Roy Harper/Nick Harper

=== Side one ===
1. "Laughing Inside" – 4:15
2. "Garden of Uranium" – 4:03
3. "Still Life" – 4:47
4. "Pinches of Salt" – 3:07
5. "Desert Island" – 4:20

=== Side two ===
1. "Government Surplus" – 2:21
2. "Surplus Liquorice" – 0:39
3. "Liquorice Alltime" – 3:43
4. "Maile Lei" – 4:34
5. "Same Shoes" – 4:15
6. "Descendants of Smith" – 3:49

=== CD bonus track ===
1. "Laughing Inside (Rough and Ready version)" – 4:10

== Personnel ==
- Roy Harper – guitar and vocals
- Jacqui Turner – sound engineer
- Stuart Elliot
- Tony Franklin
- Nik Green
- Nick Harper
- Kevin McAlea – keyboards and alto saxophone
- Mark Ramsden
