= Awareness Records =

English record label

- Founded: 1985
- Founder: Andy Ware
- Genre: Various
- Country of origin: United Kingdom
- Location: England

Awareness Records was a record label founded in the mid-1980s by its owner, Andy Ware. The label was based in England and had Roy Harper and Michael Nesmith among its artists.

== Artists ==
- Michael Nesmith
- Roy Harper
- Kurth & Taylor
- James E. Wall
- John Martyn
- Bonzo Dog Band
- The Shadows
- Cindy Lee Berryhill
- Pendragon

== See also ==
- List of record labels
