= When an Old Cricketer Leaves the Crease =

Single by Roy Harper

from the album HQ
- B-side: "Hallucinating Light" (Live)
- Released: 2 May 1975
- Recorded: March 1975
- Studio: Abbey Road Studios, London
- Length: 7:13
- Label: Harvest Records
- Songwriter: Roy Harper
- Producer: Peter Jenner

Roy Harper singles chronology
"Home (Live)" / "Home (Studio)" (1974)	"When an Old Cricketer Leaves the Crease" (1975)	"Grown-Ups Are Just Silly Children" / "Referendum (Legend)" (1975)

Official audio
- "When an Old Cricketer Leaves the Crease" (Remastered) on YouTube

"When an Old Cricketer Leaves the Crease" is a track on the Roy Harper album HQ, a prominent example of cricket poetry. Released as a single twice, in 1975 and 1978, it is possibly Harper's best-known song. The song captures the atmosphere of a village cricket match and is an elegy to the game as played during Harper's youth. It features Harper's 12-string acoustic guitar, and is backed by the Grimethorpe Colliery Band.

== Background ==
On his website Harper talks of the track as being one of the highlights of his HQ album:

My childhood memories of the heroic stature of the footballers and cricketers of the day invoke the sounds that went along with them. Paramount among these was the traditional Northern English brass band, which was a functional social component through all four seasons, being seen and heard in many different contexts. My use of that style of music on 'Old Cricketer' is a tribute to those distant memories.

== Use as epitaph ==
An elegiac song, the last on the album, Harper uses the game of cricket as an metaphor for death, in its nostalgic sense for what has passed. This is underlined as the Grimethorpe Colliery Band who enter after two minutes, arranged by David Bedford. British DJ John Peel made an agreement with his producer, John Walters, that in the event of Peel's death, Walters would play the song on air. Walters died in 2001, three years before Peel, so the request could not be fulfilled. Peel, however, played it at the end of his own show when he announced the news of Walters' death, and the song was played by fellow DJ Andy Kershaw at the end of his tribute to Peel on BBC Radio 3, broadcast on 31 October 2004.

Peel's stand-in on his BBC Radio 1 slot, Rob da Bank, also played the song at the start of the final show before Peel's funeral.

The song mentions two England cricketers in its lyrics – "And it could be Geoff and it could be John" refers to Geoffrey Boycott and John Snow. The song is dedicated to both of them.

== Track listing ==
1. "When an Old Cricketer Leaves the Crease" – 7:13
2. "Hallucinating Light" (Live)

== Cover versions ==
The song was covered by Cantabile - The London Quartet as an a cappella track on their album for Signum Classics:- Songs of Cricket.
