= HQ (album) =

Studio album by Roy Harper
- Released: June 1975
- Recorded: March 1975
- Studio: Abbey Road Studios, London
- Genre: Folk rock, progressive folk, folk baroque
- Length: 40:41
- Label: Harvest SHSP 4046; Chrysalis CHR 1105; Science Friction HUCD019
- Producer: Peter Jenner

Roy Harper chronology
Valentine (1974)	HQ (1975)	Bullinamingvase (1977)

Alternative cover
- US album cover

Professional ratings
Review scores
Source	Rating
Allmusic	link

HQ is the eighth studio album by English folk/rock singer-songwriter and guitarist Roy Harper. It was first released in 1975 by Harvest Records. In the United States the album was released under the title When An Old Cricketer Leaves The Crease, which is also the name of the LP's most popularly known track.

== History ==
Harper considered HQ to be "...probably the best record that I have made to date" and "...a great album made at one of the best times of my life" Originally the album was to be called Blood From a Stone, but it was changed to avoid unwanted comparisons with Bob Dylan's Blood on the Tracks.

== Songs ==
"The Game" features David Gilmour and John Paul Jones, playing lead guitar and bass respectively.

The "scribble lark" referred to in "Forget Me Not" is an old country name for the yellowhammer.

"When an Old Cricketer Leaves the Crease", one of Harper's best-known songs, features the Grimethorpe Colliery Band, arranged by David Bedford. The song is about cricket and references contemporary players Geoffrey Boycott and John Snow, to whom it is dedicated.

== Album cover ==
The album's artwork was created by Hipgnosis. Of the artwork Harper stated:

In reply to walking on water I should just like to say that the album sleeve design for HQ was given completely to Hipgnosis. When they presented me with the finished product I laughed and ok'd it on the spot. The picture was taken by Po Powell on the Isle of Skye. I have still not been to the Isle of Skye.

== Awards ==
In 1975, HQ was awarded Record of the Year in Portugal, and received a similar award in Finland.

== Reissues ==
The album was remastered 2016 by Harper and John Fitzgerald, at Lettercolm Studio in Timoleague, West Cork, Ireland. In 2017, the remastered version was re-issued on 180gm Vinyl, packaged in deluxe, gatefold sleeve with original cover design. There was also an additional printed heavy inner sleeve "including lyrics, comprehensive notes and images."

In 2012 the album was digitally remixed and re-released in a 24-page case bound booklet with new pictures, prose, poetry and a new sleeve design.

== Track listing ==
All tracks credited to Roy Harper.

Side One
No.	Title	Length
1.	"The Game (Parts 1–5)"	13:42
2.	"The Spirit Lives"	4:14
3.	"Grown Ups Are Just Silly Children"	2:55

Side Two
No.	Title	Length
4.	"Referendum (Legend)"	3:49
5.	"Forget Me Not"	2:24
6.	"Hallucinating Light"	6:24
7.	"When an Old Cricketer Leaves the Crease"	7:13

1995 CD reissue bonus tracks
No.	Title	Length
8.	"The Spirit Lives" (Early Mix, 23 March 1975)
9.	"When an Old Cricketer Leaves the Crease" (Live in Exeter, 31 October 1977)
10.	"Hallucinating Light" (7" single version)

== Personnel ==
- Roy Harper – vocals, acoustic guitar
- Chris Spedding – electric guitar
- Dave Cochran – bass guitar
- Bill Bruford – drums, percussion

Additional Personnel

- David Gilmour – electric guitar (on "The Game")
- John Paul Jones – bass guitar (on "The Game")
- Steve Broughton – drums, percussion (on "The Game")
- The Grimethorpe Colliery Band, arranged by David Bedford – brass (on "When an Old Cricketer Leaves the Crease")
