= Sophisticated Beggar =

Studio album by Roy Harper
- Released: 1966
- Recorded: England
- Genre: Folk, progressive folk, folk baroque
- Length: 52:49
- Label: Strike JHL 105, Science Friction HUCD007
- Producer: Peter Richards

Roy Harper chronology
Sophisticated Beggar (1966)	Come Out Fighting Ghengis Smith (1968)

Alternative cover
- Sophisticated Beggar; Reissue cover

Alternative cover
- The Return of The Sophisticated Beggar; Reissue cover

Professional ratings
Review scores
Source	Rating
Allmusic	3.5/5 stars
Rolling Stone	4/5 stars

Sophisticated Beggar is the debut album by the English folk musician Roy Harper. It was released in 1966.

== History ==
The album consists of Harper's poetry backed by acoustic guitar and recorded with a Revox tape machine by Pierre Tubbs. Tubbs was also the producer of the album, under the pseudonym Peter Richards.

When initially released the album was poorly distributed; only a few thousand were ever made, so to promote the album, Harper designed flyers and personally handed them out to shoppers in Oxford Street, London. The album's liner notes imply that both John Renbourn and Ritchie Blackmore contributed.

On the original vinyl release, after the record needle pans across the run-out groove to the lock groove, there is a recording of Harper saying "Hup hup" over and over again. Some subsequent CD releases have included this recording as a separate track, "Hup Hup Spiral".

The album has subsequently been re-released on a number of different labels, given numerous titles, and had the original track listing altered. Though still available today, Harper only receives royalties for the official Science Friction release.

== Album cover ==
The album cover was drawn by Lon Goddard who, at the time, was the barman at Les Cousins. Goddard also lived with Harper and his family in Kilburn, London, played 2nd guitar on "October Twelfth" and "Goldfish" and later designed the gatefold cover for Harper's 1970 Harvest release, Flat Baroque and Berserk.

== Track listing ==
All tracks are written by Roy Harper.

Side one
No.	Title	Length
1.	"China Girl"	3:36
2.	"Goldfish"	2:47
3.	"Sophisticated Beggar"	5:07
4.	"My Friend"	4:06
5.	"Big Fat Silver Aeroplane"	3:39
6.	"Blackpool"	5:08
7.	"Legend"	3:43

Side two
No.	Title	Length
8.	"Girlie"	3:02
9.	"October the Twelfth"	5:54
10.	"Black Clouds"	4:31
11.	"Mr. Station Master"	3:04
12.	"Forever"	3:27
13.	"Committed"	3:14

== Release history ==
Region	Date	Label	Format	Catalog	Title
United Kingdom	1966	Strike	Vinyl	JHL 105	Sophisticated Beggar
United Kingdom	1970	Youngblood	Vinyl	SSYB 7	The Return of the Sophisticated Beggar
United Kingdom	1972	Birth	Vinyl	RAB 3	The Return of the Sophisticated Beggar
United Kingdom	1977	Big Ben	Vinyl	BBX 502	The Sophisticated Beggar
United Kingdom	1985	Avon Music	Cassette	ASK 791	Sophisticated Beggar
United Kingdom	1989	Sundown	Vinyl	SDLP051/CDSM 051	Sophisticated Beggar
Germany	1989	Magnum	Vinyl	CDSM 051	Sophisticated Beggar
United Kingdom	1992	Tring	CD	JHD 064	Legend
United Kingdom	1994	Science Friction	CD	HUCD007	Sophisticated Beggar
United Kingdom	1997	Mooncrest	CD	CRESTCD 027	Return of the Sophisticated Beggar
Japan	2006	Airmail	CD	1249	Sophisticated Beggar
United Kingdom	2007	Beat Goes On	CD	BGO 771.2	The Return of the Sophisticated Beggar
Belgium	2007	One Media	CD	250183	Sophisticated Beggar
United Kingdom	2009	Vanilla OMP	CD		China Girl

== Personnel ==
- Bert Jansch
- John Renbourn
- Paul Brett
- Lon Goddard
