= The Unknown Soldier (album) =

Studio album by Roy Harper
- Released: April 11, 1980
- Recorded: Abbey Road Studios, London; Rockfield Studios, Monmouthshire, Wales; House of Music, Orange, New Jersey; Studio Aquarium, Paris; Chapel Lane Studios, Hereford
- Genre: Rock
- Label: Harvest SHVL 820, Science Friction HUCD031
- Producer: Roy Harper, Peter Jenner

Roy Harper chronology
Bullinamingvase (1977)	The Unknown Soldier (1980)	Work of Heart (1982)

Alternative cover
- Cover for German (Electrola) and Canadian release

Professional ratings
Review scores
Source	Rating
AllMusic	2.5/5 stars

The Unknown Soldier is the tenth studio album by English folk / rock singer-songwriter and guitarist Roy Harper. It was first released in 1980 by Harvest Records and was his last release on the label. Half of the tracks were co-written with David Gilmour of Pink Floyd, who also plays guitar on the album. Kate Bush duets with Harper on one of those tracks.

== History ==
The album was originally released on EMI's Harvest Records label (SHVL820) in 1980 (also Harvest ST6474 (CAN) and Electrola 1C06407259 (FRG)). In 1998 the album was reissued on Harper's Science Friction label (HUCD031).

Whilst duets are not commonplace on Roy Harper albums, Kate Bush accompanies Harper on the song "You". The song "Short and Sweet" features David Gilmour on guitar and is also found on Gilmour's first solo album, David Gilmour, released two years earlier. Harper also sang the song as a guest at one of Gilmour's 1984 concerts in London. In fact, Gilmour plays guitar on most of the album's ten songs and co-wrote five of them. Harper providing the lyrics and Gilmour the music.

Originally, the songs "I'm in Love with You", "Ten Years Ago" and "The Flycatcher", were to be released on the proposed earlier (1978–79) Harper album, Commercial Breaks. However, a dispute between Harper and EMI meant Commercial Breaks was not released until 1994. These three songs were re-recorded for The Unknown Soldier, and vary slightly from their original demo composition.

Perhaps the most remarkable moment in...the making of this record was the trip... to the battlefield at Verdun in France to take the pictures for the sleeve...disembarking at Boulogne in an undrivable hired Rover with an arse-end three miles in the air and a steering wheel on the wrong side. We hurtled down France for half a day...at the end of which we walked, stoned and soaked, into a Pension and I asked for a room for the night in my schoolboy French. "Avez vous une chambre ce soir.... etc." And a lizard woman looked us up and down... What we saw the following day brought me to tears... A sea of graves, surmounted by a monument the like of which I'd never seen anywhere. In style, it is pure Art Deco, in deference it is Egyptian, and in effect it is devastating. And it is full of the bones of hundreds of thousands of men; visible through the windows of the basement around the building. We took the pictures, even though it seemed like a sacrilege. And isn't that the nature of our beast..? I can't remember the journey home, except for its silence. Roy Harper.

== Track listing ==
All tracks credited to Roy Harper except where indicated

=== Side one ===
1. "Playing Games" (Harper, David Gilmour) – 3:12
2. "I'm in Love with You" – 3:45
3. "The Flycatcher" – 4:10
4. "You" (The Game Part II) (Harper, Gilmour) – 4:37
5. "Old Faces" (Harper, Gilmour) – 4:09

=== Side two ===
1. "Short and Sweet" (Harper, Gilmour) – 6:28
2. "First Thing in the Morning" – 3:40
3. "The Unknown Soldier" – 3:33
4. "Ten Years Ago" – 3:35
5. "True Story" (Harper, Gilmour) – 4:50

== Personnel ==
- Roy Harper – vocals

Additional performers

- Kate Bush – vocals
- David Gilmour – guitar
- Andy Roberts – guitar
- Steve Broughton – guitar
- Hugh Burns – guitar
- Sal DiTroia – guitar
- B. J. Cole – steel guitar
- Tony Levin (misspelled Tony Levi) – bass
- Jimmy Bain – bass
- Will Lee – bass
- David Lawson – keyboards
- Pete Wingfield – keyboards
- Don Grolnick – keyboards
- David Bedford : orchestrations
- Jimmy Maelen – percussion
- Andy Newmark – percussion
- George Constantino
- Jim Cuomo
- Timmy Donald
- Neil Jason
- Joe Partridge
- Sara Pozzo
- Dave Scance

Technical personnel

- Peter Jenner – executive producer, producer
- Chris Briggs – assistant executive producer
- Roy Harper – producer, sleeve design and photography
- Haydn Bendall – sound engineer, assistant producer
- John Tropea – assistant producer
- Stephen Galfas – assistant producer
- Cliff Hodson – sound engineer
- Danny Dawson – sound engineer
- John Barrett – sound engineer
- Phil Ault – sound engineer
- Adrian Boot – sleeve design and photography
- Peter Shepherd – additional sleeve design (German and Canadian release)
- Gered Mankowitz – additional photography (German and Canadian release)
