= God's Not Dead =

God's Not Dead may refer to:

- God's Not Dead (album), a 2011 studio album by Newsboys
  - Newsboys Live in Concert: God's Not Dead, a 2012 live album by Newsboys
- "God's Not Dead (Like a Lion)", a 2010 song by Newsboys
- God's Not Dead, an American Christian drama film series:
  - God's Not Dead (film), a 2014 American Christian drama film
  - God's Not Dead 2, a 2016 American Christian drama film
  - God's Not Dead: A Light in Darkness, a 2018 American Christian drama film
  - God's Not Dead: We the People, a 2021 American Christian drama film
  - God's Not Dead: In God We Trust, a 2024 American Christian drama film

== See also ==
- God is dead (disambiguation)
- "Bart's Not Dead", an episode of the television series The Simpsons referencing the film series
