= Beyond the Door =

Beyond the Door may refer to:

- Beyond the Door (1974 film), an Italian horror film
- Beyond the Door (1982 film), an Italian drama film
- Beyond the Door (short story), a short story by Philip K. Dick
- Beyond the Door (DVD), a DVD by singer-songwriter Roy Harper
- Beyond the Door, a 1991 novel by Gary Blackwood
- Beyond the Door (album), a 2019 album by Redd Kross
