= God's Not Dead (film series) =

American Christian-drama film series

- Official film series logo
- Based on: God's Not Dead by Rice Broocks
- Distributed by: Pure Flix Entertainment (1–3); Freestyle Releasing (1); Fathom Events (4–5)
- Country: United States
- Language: English
- Budget: <$13,150,000 (Total of 4 films)
- Box office: $97,748,762 (Total of 4 films)

The God's Not Dead film series consists of American Christian-drama films, based on the book of the same name authored by Rice Broocks. The overall plot centers on a Christian pastor named Rev. David "Dave" Hill, who argues for the reality of God through a number of occurrences, in a modern-day society. The main characters of the series are often forced to present proof of their beliefs.

The first three films were met with negative critical reception, although the fourth film received more mixed reviews. Despite this, the films are popular with Christian and religious audiences, and the first two were moderately successful at the box office.

== Origin ==
The 2013 Evangelical Christian book by Rice Broocks titled God's Not Dead: Evidence for God in an Age of Uncertainty serves as the inspiration for the God's Not Dead films. Released by Thomas Nelson Publishing, the book is presented by the author in a self-help manner, and argues for belief in Jesus and the Holy Bible. The book encourages Christians to remain firm in their beliefs, and not be afraid to talk about it with others in society. The place of the Bible features in the plot of the film series.

== Films ==
Film	U.S. release date	Director	Screenwriter(s)	Story by	Producer(s)	Ref.
God's Not Dead	March 21, 2014	Harold Cronk	Chuck Konzelman & Cary Solomon	Chuck Konzelman & Cary Solomon	Michael Scott, David A.R. White, Russell Wolfe and Anna Zielinski	
God's Not Dead 2	April 1, 2016	Harold Cronk	Chuck Konzelman & Cary Solomon	Chuck Konzelman & Cary Solomon	Michael Scott, David A.R. White, Russell Wolfe, Elizabeth Travis and Brittany Lefebvre	
God's Not Dead: A Light in Darkness	March 30, 2018	Michael Mason	Michael Mason	Michael Mason	Michael Scott, David A.R. White, Elizabeth Travis, Brittany Yost and Alysoun Wolfe	
God's Not Dead: We the People	October 4, 2021	Vance Null	Tommy Blaze	Cary Solomon	Brent Ryan Green and Anna Zielinski	
God's Not Dead: In God We Trust	September 12, 2024	Vance Null	Tommy Blaze	Tommy Blaze	David A. R. White	

=== God's Not Dead (2014) ===
A college student named Josh Wheaton who seeks to attain higher learning in pursuing further education, finds that his Christian faith brings him to a confrontation with his philosophy professor. The teacher named Professor Radisson, begins the class by having each student sign a document that denies the existence of God. When Josh refuses to renounce his beliefs, the professor decides that a debate between the two of them will determine his final grade. Should the entire class be convinced by Josh's statements, he can pass the course. If the class is not moved, his academic future may be at an end.

As Josh tries to prepare for this classroom event, various other individuals struggle with their personal stumbling blocks that seem to pull them away from their faith in Jesus Christ. With the assistance of the leader of his church, Reverend David "Dave" Hill, Josh prepares for the assignment. Along the way he believes there is a higher purpose to the conversation with his college professor, than merely to pass the class.

There were three 20-minute debates in which Josh sought to bring historical and scientific content to prove the existence of God, while the professor tried to prove the non-existence of God. The students became aware of facts they were not familiar with, and some had never heard of before. At the end of the debates, Josh and the professor were surprised by the reaction of the students. All the students stood up and affirmed that God is not dead. In the end, Josh attends a Newsboys concert, who perform the titular song of the same name, while Professor Radisson is accidentally run over by a car while trying to reunite with his girlfriend Mina, before being convinced by Reverend David Hill to convert to Christianity as he dies.

=== God's Not Dead 2 (2016) ===
A young high schooler named Brooke Thawley is coming to terms with the passing of her brother. Though her parents have raised the family in an atheist setting, she continues to have questions about the existence of an afterlife. She becomes impressed by the positive disposition of her history teacher named Grace Wesley, who always has joy regardless of the day. In a one-on-one conversation after class with her teacher, Ms. Wesley shares with her that a belief in a Savior, gives her purpose. When the Salvation Army comes to the house after her parents decide to donate his belongings, Brooke is surprised to discover that he had been studying The Holy Bible. As she longs for her brother's presence, she too begins to read from its pages. One day in her history class, the lesson centers around the teachings of Mahatma Gandhi and Reverend Martin Luther King Jr. and their respective sacrifices for their beliefs. Brooke raises her hand and asks about the parallels between these historical figures, and the teachings of Jesus Christ. As Grace knows what Brooke has been going through in her personal life, she acknowledges the similarities and quotes some lines of scripture to emphasize the girl's realizations. Another student in the class records the interaction using their cell phone, and tells someone else that the teacher has been preaching in the classroom. By word of mouth, the incident gets relayed to the principal of the school. Grace is called into the office and given disciplinary action, and is placed on administrative leave, while the school investigates the situation. At her next meeting, she is given a plea deal by the School Board, where she will retain her job by apologizing for sharing these scriptures in class. Grace sees this as denouncing her beliefs, and argues that she did nothing wrong by acknowledging her student's question. The Board options to send the occurrence to court, where she will have to legally fight to retain her job.

As Grace prepares for the trial by hiring a lawyer through a teachers union, the prosecutor tries to subpoena the sermons of all local preachers. Additionally, the prosecuting team approaches Brooke's parents with the option that if they stand as a witness against her teacher, appearing as examples that "there is no all-knowing deity", they will ensure the girl gets funding for her college education. When the trial begins, Grace defends her freedom of speech, and the defensive attorneys argue that the discussion that took place in class was an example of a historical analysis of Jesus, as opposed to purely evangelical. Reverend David Hill is approached with a request to release his sermons to the prosecuting team, to which he denies their request, resulting in his eventual arrest by state authorities. When Brooke decides to take a stand as a witness in favor of the intentions of her teacher, the young high schooler finds her new-found faith means something more as she must defend her beliefs in a court of law.

=== God's Not Dead: A Light in Darkness (2018) ===
After some time, Reverend David Hill is released from incarceration following his denial to legal authorities in releasing his evangelical materials. Controversy surrounding his arrest ignites discussions on at the campus, to close the St. James Church and convert the building to a secular school extension. As the school board votes in favor to shut down the church, Rev. Dave and Rev. Jude Mbaye attempt to convince them otherwise. When this proves to be unfruitful, they option to sue the college. A student named Adam who is angered by his recent breakup with his girlfriend throws a brick into the church window, unintentionally starting a fire which almost destroys the building and kills Jude who was inside at the time.

David seeks the help of his estranged brother Pearce, a successful atheist lawyer. His brother does not believe that the case is something worth fighting for, and tries to convince Rev. Dave of the improbable outcome. Overcome with guilt, Adam confesses to the fire through a text message. The young man is arrested, and scheduled to be tried for felony charges. As David seeks divine guidance, he must decide whether to let the charges go or if the mistakes of the college student should end in his imprisonment; all while receiving spiritual promptings that St. James Church may not be the answer to his ecclesiastical responsibilities.

=== God's Not Dead: We the People (2021) ===
A group of families choose to begin home-schooling their children, following a sermon by their local pastor. After an unexpected visit from a social services worker, the parents find themselves at odds with the law, when the representative decides that what is being taught in the home is not sufficient. Citing state core standards, a local judge gives the group a week to develop a court case that they will present before a court of law in Washington D.C. where they must show that their at home studies are adequate to meet the requirements; otherwise the children will need to return to public schooling. As the parents develop their case, various other leaders of churches become involved including Reverend David Hill.

Taken aback by what he believes to be government interference over their personal freedoms, Rev. Hill finds that he is determined to help these families prove that they are free to teach their children as they would like, and to enlighten Congress that in a modern-day United States, God is still present and relevant.

=== God's Not Dead: In God We Trust (2024) ===
In September 2022 it was announced that a fifth installment in the film series was in development, officially titled God's Not Dead: Rise Up. However, the film was re-titled to God's Not Dead: In God We Trust. Directed by Vance Null, it follows Reverend David "Dave" Hill as he runs for office in a campaign against an opponent named Peter Kane, that seeks to remove religion from public policy, and the Reverend begins to question: "Is God dead in American politics?"

David A. R. White reprised his starring role in addition to serving as producer, while Dean Cain, Isaiah Washington, Ray Wise, Cory Oliver, Brad Heller, and the Newsboys returned in their respective roles. Production commenced in the last months during 2022, in South Carolina. The project was produced by Pinnacle Peak Pictures and distributed by Pure Flix. The film was scheduled to be released in 2023. After filming was delayed due to the 2023 SAG-AFTRA strike, additional photography took place in November 2023, as well as April 2024. The film was released on September 12, 2024.

== Main cast and characters ==
List indicator

This section includes characters who will appear or have appeared in the franchise in main roles.

- An empty grey cell indicates the character was not in the film, or that the character's official presence has not yet been confirmed.

Character	Films				
Character	God's Not Dead	God's Not Dead 2	God's Not Dead: A Light in Darkness	God's Not Dead: We the People	God's Not Dead: In God We Trust
Rev. David "Dave" Hill	David A. R. White	David A. R. White	David A. R. White	David A. R. White	David A. R. White
Jeffrey Radisson	Kevin Sorbo				
Josh Wheaton	Shane Harper		Shane Harper		
Mina Shelley	Cory Oliver				Cory Oliver
Mark Shelley	Dean Cain				Dean Cain
Grace Wesley		Melissa Joan Hart			
Walter Wesley		Pat Boone			
Tom Endler		Jesse Metcalfe			
Brooke Thawley		Hayley Orrantia			
Marlene		Sadie Robertson			
Pete Kane		Ray Wise			Ray Wise
Pearce Hill			John Corbett		
Adam Richertson			Mike Manning		
Keaton Young			Samantha Boscarino		
Teo			Aaron "Shwayze" Smith		
Sydney			Jennifer Cipolla		
Cissy Houston			Herself		
Mike McKinnon				Antonio Sabàto Jr.	
Rebecca McKinnon				Francesca Battistelli	
Brandon McKinnon				Matt Anspach	
Kayla Neely				Dani Oliveros	
Ayisha Moradi	Hadeel Sittu			Hadeel Sittu	
Misrab Moradi	Marco Khan			Marco Khan	
Rep. Daryl Smith				Isaiah Washington	Isaiah Washington
Martin Yip	Paul Kwo	Paul Kwo		Paul Kwo	Paul Kwo
Amy Ryan	Trisha Fache	Trisha Fache			
Judge Elizabeth Neely			Jeanine Pirro	Jeanine Pirro	
Rev. Jude Mbaye	Benjamin Onyango	Benjamin Onyango	Benjamin Onyango	Benjamin Onyango	
Newsboys	Michael Tait, Jody Davis, Jeff Frankenstein, & Duncan Phillips		Michael Tait & Duncan Phillips		Michael Tait, Jody Davis, Adam Agee, Jeff Frankenstein, & Duncan Phillips
School attorney		Brad Heller			Brad Heller

== Additional crew and production details ==
Film	Crew/Detail						
Film	Composer	Cinematographer	Editor	Production companies	Distributing companies	Running time	Ref.
God's Not Dead	Will Musser	Brian Shanley	Vance Null	Check the Gate Productions, Pure Flix Studios, Red Entertainment Group	Freestyle Releasing, Pure Flix Entertainment	1 hr 52 mins	
God's Not Dead 2	Will Musser	Brian Shanley	Vance Null	Pure Flix Studios	Pure Flix Entertainment	2 hrs	
God's Not Dead: A Light in Darkness	Pancho Burgos-Goizueta	Brian Shanley	Joseph Sandoval	Pure Flix Studios	Pure Flix Entertainment	1 hr 56 mins	
God's Not Dead: We the People	Pancho Burgos-Goizueta	Brian Shanley	Vance Null	Pinnacle Peak Pictures	Fathom Events	1 hr 31 mins	
God's Not Dead: In God We Trust	Pancho Burgos-Goizueta	Brian Shanley	David Codeglia	Pinnacle Peak Pictures	Fathom Events	1 hr 36 mins	

== Reception ==
=== Box office and financial performance ===
Film	Box office gross			Box office ranking		Video sales gross	Worldwide total gross income	Budget	Worldwide total net income	Ref.
Film	North America	Other territories	Worldwide	All time North America	All time worldwide	North America	Worldwide total gross income	Budget	Worldwide total net income	Ref.
God's Not Dead	$60,755,732	$3,920,617	$64,676,349	#1,436	#7,251	$32,353,305	$97,029,654	$1,150,000	$95,879,654	
God's Not Dead 2	$20,774,575	$3,713,273	$24,487,848	#3,654	#7,465	$8,156,453	$32,644,301	$5,000,000	$27,644,301	
God's Not Dead: A Light in Darkness	$5,728,940	$1,685,238	$7,414,178	#6,205	#8,774	$2,698,068	$10,112,246	<$5,000,000	>$5,112,246	
God's Not Dead: We the People	$1,170,387	—N/a	$1,170,387	#8,441	#14,076	$1,018,853	$2,189,240	$2,000,000	$189,240	
God's Not Dead: In God We Trust	$3,269,322	—N/a	$3,269,322	#7,405	#11,785	?	$3,269,322	?	?	
Totals	$91,698,956	$9,319,128	$101,018,084	x̄ #5,429	x̄ #9,871	$44,226,679	$145,244,763	<$13,150,000	>$128,825,441	

=== Critical and public response ===
Film	Rotten Tomatoes	Metacritic	CinemaScore
God's Not Dead	12% (26 reviews)	16/100 (6 reviews)	—N/a
God's Not Dead 2	10% (40 reviews)	22/100 (8 reviews)	A
God's Not Dead: A Light in Darkness	10% (20 reviews)	33/100 (9 reviews)	A−
God's Not Dead: We the People	—N/a (2 reviews)	—N/a	—N/a
