= God's Not Dead 2 =

2016 film by Harold Cronk

- Theatrical release poster
- Directed by: Harold Cronk
- Written by: Chuck Konzelman; Cary Solomon
- Based on: Characters created by Rice Broocks
- Produced by: Elizabeth Hatcher-Travis; Brittany Lefebvre; Michael Scott; David A. R. White; Russell Wolfe; Matt Shapira; Nathan Wenban
- Starring: Melissa Joan Hart; Jesse Metcalfe; David A. R. White; Ernie Hudson; Hayley Orrantia; Robin Givens; Fred Dalton Thompson; Maria Canals-Barrera; Sadie Robertson; Pat Boone; Ray Wise
- Cinematography: Brian Shanley
- Edited by: Vance Null
- Music by: Will Musser
- Production companies: Pure Flix; 10 West Studios; Mutiny FX; GND Media Group; Believe Entertainment
- Distributed by: Pure Flix Entertainment
- Release date: April 1, 2016
- Running time: 120 minutes
- Country: United States
- Language: English
- Budget: $5 million
- Box office: $24.5 million

God's Not Dead 2 (also known as God's Not Dead 2: He's Surely Alive) is a 2016 American Christian drama film, directed by Harold Cronk, and starring Melissa Joan Hart, Jesse Metcalfe, David A. R. White, Hayley Orrantia and Sadie Robertson. It is a sequel to God's Not Dead (2014), and the second installment in the titular film series. Aside from David A.R. White reprising his role as Reverend David Hill, Paul Kwo, Benjamin Onyango, and Tricha LaFache also reprise their roles as Martin Yip, Reverend Jude, and Amy Ryan respectively. It follows a high school teacher facing a court case that could end her career, after having answered a student's seemingly innocuous question about Jesus. The film presents an evangelical perspective on the separation of church and state.

Like its predecessor, the film received widely negative reviews from critics, who considered it a wildly unrealistic example of alleged anti-Christian legal cases to the point of playing into the Christian persecution complex; the film's understanding of how church and state are balanced in education was criticized as "wholly divorced from any rational understanding of the topic". The film is seemingly an inversion of historical cases of prosecution of science teachers over the teaching of evolution, portrayed in films such as Inherit the Wind. As with God's Not Dead, critics felt that atheists were again portrayed as flat stereotypes and as unrealistic, scheming villains.

God's Not Dead 2 was released on April 1, 2016. It was the final film role for Fred Dalton Thompson, who died in November 2015. Despite being a large critical failure, it was moderately successful at the box office, earning $24 million on a $5 million budget, though making for a total gross of almost a third of its predecessor.

== Plot ==
AP United States History teacher Grace Wesley, a devout evangelical Christian, notices that one of her students, Brooke Thawley, is withdrawn following the recent accidental death of her brother. Involved in little more than her studies, Brooke notices Grace's hopefulness and asks where Grace finds her optimism. Grace replies, "Jesus," and Brooke begins to read the Christian Bible for herself. Former left-wing blogger Amy Ryan goes to the hospital and finds out that her cancer has miraculously vanished. She talks to Michael Tait of the Newsboys, who encourages her, stating that prayers can be answered with faith. As Grace lectures on Mahatma Gandhi and Martin Luther King Jr., Brooke asks whether their peaceful teachings relate to the biblical account of Jesus' Sermon on the Mount. Grace responds in the affirmative and relates parts of Christian scripture to Rev. Dr. King's teachings. A student immediately texts his parents about the class, and the ensuing backlash draws the ire of Principal Kinney. After speaking to his friend Josh, Martin Yip, a college student, visits Pastor David Hill to ask him 147 questions about God. Grace is subsequently brought before the school board. Grace's case draws the attention of Tom Endler, a defense attorney willing to aid her despite being a non-Christian himself.

The school board brings Grace's case before a judge in Little Rock, Arkansas, hoping to secure her termination and strip her of her teaching license unless she issues an apology, which Grace refuses to do. To Brooke's horror, prosecutor Pete Kane declares that the lawsuit will "prove once and for all that God is dead". His opening argument suggests that the society of the United States will crumble should Grace fail to be found guilty. Endler argues for the historicity of Jesus and thus that the Christian Bible is an appropriate subject of classroom discussion. Christian apologist J. Warner Wallace is called as an expert witness, along with Lee Strobel, to defend the idea.

Brooke, after entering the courtroom, is allowed as a witness. Kane tricks her into admitting that Grace, not Brooke, initiated their first conversation about Jesus. As Grace becomes increasingly discouraged, Brooke and her friends sing her a song to build up her spirits. Martin visits David in the hospital with his friend Jude after David collapses in the courtroom due to appendicitis and announces that he feels his call is as a pastor in China. Using a tactic to position Grace as a hostile witness, Endler gets the judge to inform the jury not to let their bias or prejudices interfere with their verdict. The jury ultimately decides in favor of Grace, who rejoices with Brooke and Endler as Kane stands humiliated. As they celebrate their victory, Brooke convinces the crowd that "God's not dead", and they could receive the Christian "good news" while Newsboys sing their song "Guilty", dedicating it to Grace standing up to the court.

In a post-credits scene, a fully recovered David is arrested by the police for failing to turn in his sermons to the government, as shown earlier in the film. Jude and Martin watch as David is taken away. Then, Martin wonders what to do next, and Jude replies, "Same as always, Martin: We pray in faith," as David is driven off to jail, setting up the events for God's Not Dead: A Light in Darkness.

== Cast ==
- Melissa Joan Hart as Grace Wesley, a devout evangelical Christian and AP US History teacher who believes she must give up her faith or give up her job
- Jesse Metcalfe as Tom Endler, Grace's attorney
- David A. R. White as Reverend David Hill, reprising his role from the first film
- Hayley Orrantia as Brooke Thawley, a high school student who converts to Christianity
- Sadie Robertson as Marlene, one of Grace's students and a friend of Brooke. In real life, the actress is the daughter of Duck Dynasty host Willie Robertson and his wife Korie, both of whom made cameos in the first film
- Ernie Hudson as Judge Robert Stennis, the judge in charge of Wesley's case
- Pat Boone as Walter Wesley, Grace's grandfather
- Fred Dalton Thompson as Senior Pastor
- Robin Givens as Principal Kinney, the principal of Martin Luther King Jr. High School
- Carey Scott as Richard Thawley, Brooke's father
- Maria Canals-Barrera as Catherine Thawley, Brooke's mother
- Benjamin Onyango as Reverend Jude, reprising his role from the prior film
- Ray Wise as Pete Kane
- Paul Kwo as Martin Yip, a college student who appeared in the first film
- Jon Lindstrom as Jim Powell
- Eamonn McCrystal as Simon Boyle
- Abigail Duhon as Jessica
- Trisha LaFache as Amy Ryan, a former atheist blogger turned Christian who has been healed of cancer, reprises her role from the previous film

== Production ==
Filming took place in Little Rock, Arkansas, including the Pulaski County courthouse, near Hillcrest, Arkansas, and in Saline County.

Both the Christian rock band The Newsboys and former Arkansas Governor Mike Huckabee have cameos. Christian apologists and authors Lee Strobel and J. Warner Wallace appear as trial witnesses. Local NBC affiliate KARK-TV personalities Mallory Brooks and Victoria Price both appear as reporters.

== Release ==
=== Promotion ===
The day before the 2016 Iowa caucuses, presidential candidate Mike Huckabee (who appears in one scene) offered a free screening of the film.

=== Box office ===
God's Not Dead 2 was projected to gross around $14 million from 2,419 theaters in its opening weekend by Box Office Pro, which pointed to the first film's unprecedented successful $9.2 million opening from roughly 1/3 the number of locations God's Not Dead 2 would debut in; however, it debuted to just $7.6 million, finishing fourth at the box office, behind Batman v Superman: Dawn of Justice ($51.3 million), Zootopia ($19.3 million) and My Big Fat Greek Wedding 2 ($11.2 million). In its second weekend, it fell -44.4%, grossing $4.2 million and finishing seventh. As of December 2019, the film has grossed over $20.8 million domestically, $1.5 million in Brazil, and $24.5 million worldwide, less than 40% of the worldwide gross of God's Not Dead.

=== Critical response ===
Like its predecessor, God's Not Dead 2 was panned by critics. Rotten Tomatoes gives the film a rating of 10%, based on 40 reviews, with an average rating of 3.5/10. The site's consensus states: "Every bit the proselytizing lecture promised by its title, God's Not Dead 2 preaches ham-fistedly to its paranoid conservative choir." On Metacritic, the film has a score of 22 out of 100, based on 8 critics, indicating "generally unfavorable" reviews. Audiences polled by CinemaScore gave the film an average grade of "A" on an A+ to F scale. Deadline noted that "faith-based films have an easy time gaining an A on CinemaScore."

Many reviews focus on the deeply unrealistic nature of the events portrayed, characterizing it as a straw man of actual anti-Christian sentiment. For example, Silpa Kovvali, writing in Salon wrote:

It's impossible to stress how deeply unrealistic the film's premise is, and important to stress that this case was not "based on a true story," itself a loose specification. Nor was it a dramatized version of real events as Inherit the Wind, based on the 1925 Scopes Monkey Trial, was. ... The movie suggests the persecution of Christians in our society is readily apparent in the real world, and not just as artistic license. ("Join the movement," the closing credits implore). Then why on earth would its writers and producers have to invent such a case out of thin air, rather than portraying one of the multitudes of victimless crimes for which Christians throughout the country are presumably being prosecuted? Perhaps because employees demanding contraceptive coverage or gay couples service might be more sympathetic than fiendish ACLU lawyers?

— Silpa Kovvali.

Bill Zwecker of the Chicago Sun-Times felt that the underlying issues presented in the film are relevant in today's world but criticized the lack of subtlety, saying, "the entire film simply comes off as a two-hour, jazzed-up movie version of a sermon." Frank Scheck of The Hollywood Reporter criticized the film's fictitious portrayal of supposed Christian victimhood, writing, "Pounding its agenda with all the subtlety of a sledgehammer, God's Not Dead 2 will no doubt please its target audience. Everyone else will be left wondering why its fans seem to be suffering from such a persecution complex." Jordan Hoffman at The Guardian deemed it "a much better movie than God's Not Dead, but that's a bit like saying a glass of milk left on the table hasn't curdled and is merely sour," and stated that "it is unfortunately just professional enough that there are only brief instances of transcendent badness, rather than drawn-out sequences." Shelia O'Malley of RogerEbert.com gave the film 1.5/4 stars and acknowledged that "there are serious movies about the Christian faith, about the persecution of the faithful, and about the intolerance that goes both ways," but that "God's Not Dead 2 is not one of them."

Michael Foust's review in The Christian Post said the film is "a much-improved sequel," with better acting and a more believable plot.

== Accolades ==
The movie was awarded the prize for Best Movie for Mature Audiences at the MovieGuide Awards.

== Sequels ==
A third film in the series, God's Not Dead: A Light in Darkness, was released in March 2018 a fourth, God's Not Dead: We the People, was released in October 2021 and a fifth God’s Not Dead: In God We Trust September 2024.
