= Duhan =

Duhan is a surname. Notable people with the surname include:

- Hans Duhan (1890–1971), Austrian baritone
- Johnny Duhan (1950–2024), Irish singer-songwriter
- Udita Duhan (born 1998), Indian field hockey player

== See also ==
- Duhon
