= God is dead (disambiguation) =

"God is dead" is a statement made by the German philosopher Friedrich Nietzsche.

God is dead may also refer to:

- God Is Dead (comics), an American comic book series by Jonathan Hickman and Mike Costa
- God Is Dead (novel), a 2007 novel by Ron Currie Jr.
- God Is Dead, a volume of the manga series Bleach
- "God is Dead", a song by Leatherface from their 2010 album The Stormy Petrel
- "God Is Dead", a song by The Smith Street Band from their 2020 album Don't Waste Your Anger
- "God Is Dead?", a 2013 single by Black Sabbath

== See also ==
- God's Not Dead (disambiguation)
- The Death of God, a 1961 book by Gabriel Vahanian
- "The Death of God" (song), a 2005 single by Roy Harper
- Death of God theology, a Christian theological movement
- "Is God Dead?", a 1966 Time magazine cover story
