= Abigail Duhon =

American musician and actress (born 2000)

- Born: Abigail Cheramie Duhon; April 20, 2000 (age 26); New Orleans, Louisiana
- Genres: CCM, Christian EDM, electropop
- Occupations: Singer, songwriter, actress
- Instruments: Vocals, singer-songwriter
- Years active: 2011–present
- Labels: Dream Label Group, IShine, Infinity
- Website: abigailduhon.com

Abigail Cheramie Duhon (born April 20, 2000) is an American Christian musician and actress. She released a studio album, Right Now, with IShine Records and Infinity Music Group, in 2014. The album saw two of its singles, "La La La" and "Praying for You", place on the Billboard magazine Hot Singles Sales chart. Her subsequent release, an extended play, More Than Gold, was independently released, in 2015.

== Early life ==
Abigail Cheramie Duhon was born on April 20, 2000, in New Orleans, Louisiana, to father, Troy Joseph Duhon, an automobile dealership owner, and mother, Tracy Cheramie Duhon. She has an older brother, Joshua Duhon, and two younger sisters, with her younger brother, Jonathan Joseph Duhon, dying of Potter's Syndrome on the day he was born. Her first song was penned at the age of six, along with starting piano lessons and vocal training at nine years old, while becoming a recording artist at eleven.

== Music career ==
Her music recording career commenced in 2011, however her first studio album, Right Now, was released on March 15, 2014, by IShine Records. She had two singles breakthrough on the Billboard magazine Hot Singles Sales chart, with the first one "La La La", placing at a peak of No. 3, while her second, "Praying for You", charting at a peak of No. 7. The subsequent release, an extended play, More Than Gold, was released independently, on August 14, 2015.

== Acting career ==
Duhon appeared in God's Not Dead in 2014, God's Not Dead 2 in 2016, and God's Not Dead: A Light in Darkness in 2018. In 2016, Duhon partnered with the directors, producers and actors of Visible Pictures, to write and record a song, "I'm Not Ashamed" for the 2016 film I'm Not Ashamed. In return, Duhon appeared in the film as the character Chloe beside Cameron McKendry and Bella Robertson.

She appeared in the drama-biographical film, The Pastor in December 2018.

== Discography ==
Studio albums

- Right Now (March 15, 2014, IShine)
- God's Not Dead: A Light In Darkness (Songs From And Inspired By The Motion Picture) (March 30, 2018, Dream Records, DRE)

EPs

- Abigail Duhon (May 26, 2017, Dream Records)
- More Than Gold (August 14, 2015, Independent)

== Filmography ==
Films
Year	Title	Role	Notes
2014	God's Not Dead	Abby Wheaton	Recurring role
2016	God's Not Dead 2	Jessica	
2016	Caged No More	Elle	A main character
2016	I'm Not Ashamed	Chloe	Minor character and artist featured in I'm Not Ashamed
2017	Camp Cool Kids	Rosemary	
2018	God's Not Dead: A Light in Darkness	Hadleigh Student No. 2	Regular role
2018	The Pastor	Abby	Post-production
