= Duhon =

Duhon is a surname. Notable people with the surname include:

- Abigail Duhon (born 2000), American musician and actress
- Bobby Duhon (born 1946), American football player
- Chris Duhon (born 1982), American basketball player
- Edwin Duhon (1910–2006), American musician
- Josh Duhon (born 1982), American actor
