= The Last Guitar =

2010 album by Nick Harper

Studio album by Nick Harper
- Released: 2010
- Genre: Indie folk
- Label: Sangraal

Nick Harper chronology
Miracles for Beginners (2007)	The Last Guitar (2010)	Riven (2013)

The Last Guitar is a 2010 album from UK singer-songwriter Nick Harper.

== Track listing ==
1. "One of the 38"
2. "For You"
3. "The Story of My Heart"
4. "Ama Dablam"
5. "Passing Chord"
6. "Hey Bomb"
7. "Freestyle"
8. "Pop Fiction"
9. "On"
10. "Jim Crow Is Dead"
11. "The Last Guitar"
12. "Silly Daddy"
