= Nick Harper =

English singer-songwriter and guitarist (born 1965)

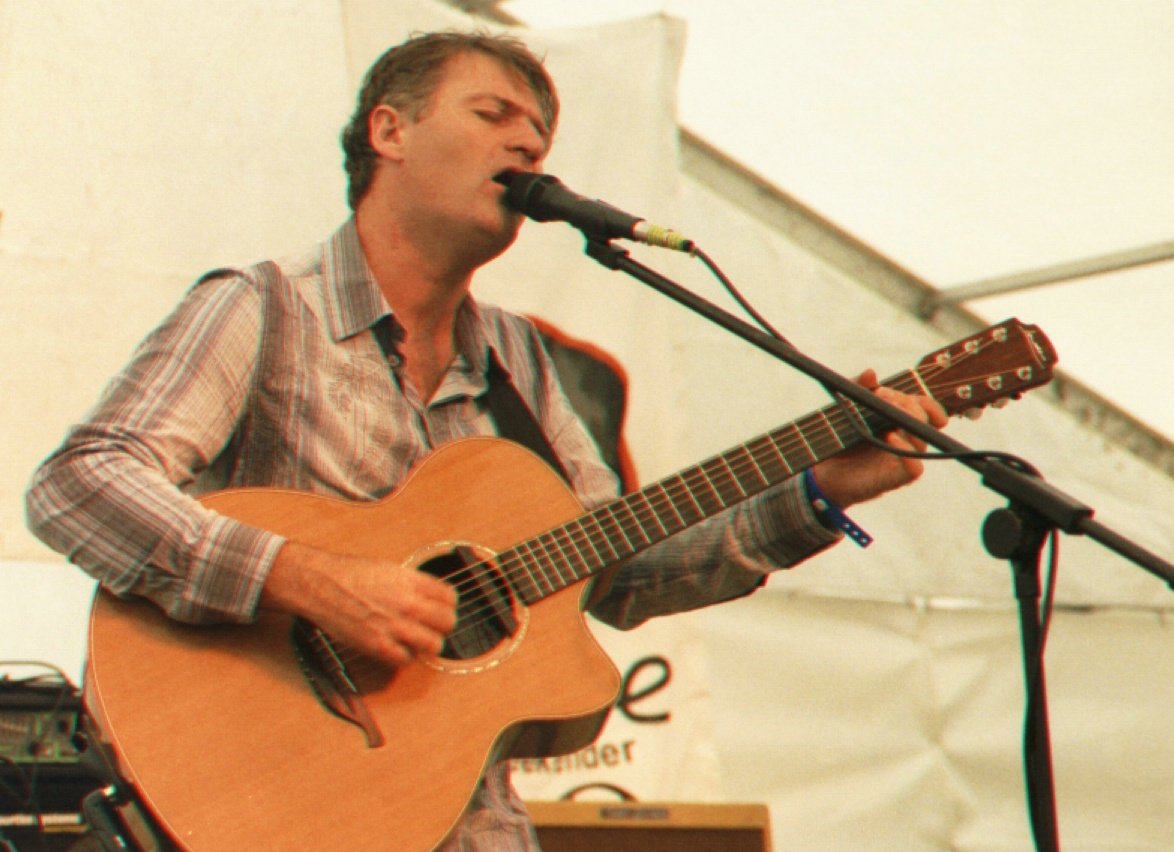
- Harper performing at the De Montfort Hall Summer Sundae

Background information
- Born: 22 June 1965 (age 61); London, England
- Genres: Folk; folk rock; alternative rock
- Occupation: Musician
- Instruments: Vocals; guitar
- Years active: 1985–present
- Label: Sangraal
- Formerly of: Squeeze
- Website: harperspace.com

Nick Harper (born 22 June 1965) is an English singer-songwriter and guitarist. He is the son of English musician Roy Harper.

== Early life ==
Harper was born in London, England, to the folk singer-songwriter Roy Harper and Monica "Mocy" Weston. Nick tells of how he remembers a continual procession through the Harper household of his father's famous friends, including not only 'folk/acoustic' artists such as Davy Graham, Bert Jansch, John Renbourn, Jackson C. Frank, Sandy Denny and Paul Simon but also rock musicians such as Keith Moon, Jimmy Page, Robert Plant, David Gilmour and others. Influenced by his upbringing in such company Nick himself started playing guitar at the age of 10. He made his recording debut on his father's 1985 Whatever Happened to Jugula?, and subsequently toured with him for a few years before beginning a musical career of his own.

Nick is mentioned in the opening line, "Nicky my child he stands there with the wind in his hair", of "McGoohan's Blues", on his father's third album Folkjokeopus (1969). Nick also made an appearance on stage at his father's 1974 "Roy Harper's Valentine Day Massacre" concert, telling knock-knock jokes to Keith Moon.

== Career ==
His first solo release was the 1994 EP Light at the End of the Kennel which he quickly succeeded with his 1995 album Seed. In 1996, after this release, he had a chance meeting with Squeeze frontman and songwriter Glenn Tilbrook, which led to Harper being given the support slot for a Squeeze tour and being signed to Tilbrook's own Quixotic label.

Following tours in the UK, US and Japan, Harper recorded both the 1998 album Smithereens and 2000's Harperspace with Tilbrook as producer. After moving to the Sangraal label in the early 2000s, a further EP (2001's Instrumental), live double album (2002's Double Life) and studio album (Blood Songs in 2004) were released.

His 2005 album Treasure Island was a change of direction, seeing both a concerted shift to more overtly political themes (songs such as "Knuckledraggers", "Sleeper Cell" and "Intelligent Design" – spliced together from audio clips of George W. Bush's speeches on the war on terror – were all highly critical of the Bush regime) and to more historical perspectives. According to Harper,"The album's title track is inspired by an obscure Liverpudlian philanthropist, Joseph Williamson, who employed destitute men returning from the Napoleonic Wars, to dig tunnels for no other reason than to give them something to do. This venture is referenced in Uk TV's Dr Who 'Flux' aired in November 2021.

May 2007 saw a special iTunes download release of his first single "Blue Sky Thinking", taken from his sixth studio album Miracles for Beginners on behalf of the Love Hope Strength foundation, a cancer charity founded to provide a global support network for cancer survivors. It received favourable reviews and radio airplay across the UK and Europe. All proceeds from the single went to the Foundation. Miracles for Beginners itself was released in June 2007.

After taking a three-year hiatus from recording to focus on touring and charity work, he announced that in February 2010 he would embark on a UK tour to promote his forthcoming album, The Last Guitar. The album was released the following month and features his then 13-year-old daughter taking a guest vocal slot on one of the songs, "Silly Daddy".

The tour and album served as a prelude to his gig on the Glastonbury Festival Avalon stage on 26 June 2010.

Harper's 2013 album Riven was perhaps his most ambitious work. 'Riven' contains 15 songs in 75 minutes of music. With guest appearances including Jakko Jakszyk of King Crimson, Dave Graney and jon Leveller. He quickly followed this in October 2014 with an all-acoustic album Nix, Harper's 9th studio album of 9 songs recorded in 9 days.

In 2016 Harper teamed up with west-country musicians Jacob and Reuben Tyghe of Port Erin and Isaac Phillips of Wasuremono to form 'Nick Harper and The Wilderness Kids'. The resulting album Lies! Lies! Lies! was recorded and produced by Tchad Blake at La Fabrique in France and toured in 2017.

In 2017 Harper produced an epic paean to his home county of Wiltshire called 'A Wiltshire Tale'. The project was supported by Wiltshire Creative, based at Salisbury Playhouse and Harper toured a one man spoken word show with added music and effects in surround sound across the West country in 2018. The show was directed by Jo Newman.

2019 saw Harper tour the '58 Fordwych Road' show. Harper related tales and anecdotes of the folk luminaries who would drop by and jam with his father at the address where he spent the first 5 years of his life. The music was a selection of songs associated with each artist, set in a recreation of the flat with items still in Harper's possession.

In 2020, Harper released Phantastes, a crowdfunded album that was partly inspired by the 1858 book of the same name by George MacDonald.

A live 58 Fordwych Road album was released in 2025, in two editions. A 16 track "Deluxe Version" included between-song anecdotes whereas the 10 track version contained the same songs, but added two further tracks originally by Bert Jansch and Roy Harper.

== Touring ==
Harper frequently plays solo acoustic tours of the UK as well as European dates and festivals across the UK and Europe. In 2003, he was awarded a Herald Fringe Angel award for performance excellence at the Edinburgh Festival Fringe, where he has played many residencies in recent years. He received a second Fringe Angel award for his show 58 Fordwych Road in 2019.

He performed at the 2004 Cropredy Festival and Leicester's Summer Sundae. He has also played sets at the Glastonbury and Beautiful Days festivals numerous times, including both in summer 2005, then again in summer 2010.

In summer 2006, he again played a multitude of festivals, including the Moseley Folk Festival, Jersey Live, Beautiful Days and Clonakilty's second annual Guitar Festival, along with appearances at festivals in France and Catalonia. In November 2007, he performed at the International Guitar Festival of Great Britain for the fourth time.

In 2008 he performed at Trowbridge Village Pump Festival, Beautiful Days, Newquay's Rip Curl Beach Sessions and Tenby Folk Festival and appeared at London's Royal Albert Hall on 27 September 2008, where he brought his 12-year-old daughter Lily on stage at the end of the set to accompany him on Crosby, Stills, Nash & Young's "Our House". This was of some historical note as he had done the same with his own father Roy Harper some 35 years before on the same stage.

During 2009, Harper played at Celtic Connections in Glasgow in January before starting 'The 38' tour, covering 38 dates across the UK. During the summer of that year he performed in Norway, France and Italy before a series of dates on America's East Coast in September, returning to the US in November for a coast-to-coast tour with Cy Curnin of The Fixx.

== Charity work ==
In January 2005, Harper played two shows in Thailand to raise money for Indian Ocean tsunami relief.

In 2007, 2008 and 2010, he climbed Snowdon with the Love Hope Strength foundation to play near the summit and then played at evening gigs, all in aid of cancer charities in the surrounding area.

In October 2007, he joined a 38-strong team of musicians including Glenn Tilbrook, Mike Peters and Cy Curnin, along with mountaineers and cancer survivors, who, again in aid of the Love Hope Strength Foundation. The group took part in a 14-day trek to 18,500 ft Mount Everest base camp, where they performed an acoustic concert. This Everest Rocks trek culminated with a grand finale concert in Kathmandu on 29 October and raised more than US$250,000 for the only charitable cancer hospital in Nepal, situated at Bhaktapur (approx. 10 miles east of Kathmandu). Alex Coletti (producer of MTV's Unplugged series) filmed the trek for a documentary, Everest Rocks, which premiered on the Palladia channel on 7 September 2008 and was also released on DVD.

In October 2008, the setting was Machu Picchu and the concert was Peru Rocks. Then, in September 2009, he again joined Love Hope Strength trekkers to undertake another charity trek called Kilimanjaro Rocks. The musicians, supporters and cancer survivors scaled the 19,341 feet (5,895 m) peak of Mount Kilimanjaro in Tanzania. The trek raised funds for bone marrow drives and the main cancer centre in Nairobi, Kenya.

Harper hosted his own Love Hope Strength fundraiser, Avebury Rocks, which first took place on 9 July 2011 and ran until 2019. Funds were also raised for The Prospect Hospice in Wroughton, Wiltshire where Harper's mother died. The events included 20-mile walks starting and ending at Avebury Stone Circle, in the day and a concert in the evening. Headliners at the concerts included Newton Faulkner, Mike Peters of The Alarm, Cy Curnin and Jamie West-Oram of The Fixx, Levellers, Gabby Young and Other Animals, The Correspondents and Harper himself.

== Critical acclaim ==
While not having reached the levels of popularity – or notoriety – of his father, Harper has received critical and popular acclaim as a live performer, especially for his acoustic guitar playing. The Times stated that he "does things to his [guitar] that would have had Segovia weeping into his Rioja", and a critic said that he could count "at least eight fingers on the neck of [Harper's] guitar". Harper uses tuning pegs as an integral part of his playing style, turning them mid-song to intentionally cause a pitch bend. His unique style of playing has also been called "nothing short of genius".

Though he has received more plaudits for his live work than for his recordings, his albums have also received significant critical acclaim. Speaking of his album Miracles for Beginners, Mojo called it "his most focused, warm and triumphant album to date" (4 stars), The Herald (Glasgow) said the album is "borne on masterful acoustic guitar patterns... ten minor miracles." (4 stars) and The Sun stated that "like his dad, he's a fine folk troubadour and a great guitarist... this is a witty, vibrant affair... a rewarding listen." (3.5 stars). Charles De Ledesma for BBC Online took a less enthusiastic viewpoint, saying that "this Harper set is a little patchy, especially if compared alongside 1995's Seed and 2004's Blood Songs which updated brilliantly the folk confessional", but the author still admits that "Harper though must be applauded for trying be a politically inclined sort of modern troubadour".

Tom Robinson declared Harper "My musical discovery of 2016!" on his BBC6 radio show.

== Influences ==
Some of the major musical influences on him include his father Roy Harper, Killing Joke, Public Enemy, Stephen Stills, Gang of Four, Frank Zappa, Eric Idle of Monty Python, Django Reinhardt, Jeff Buckley and Led Zeppelin. He has covered songs by many of these artists in concert.

== Work with other artists ==
Harper's first recordings and major live exposure were with his father Roy Harper. He played the David Gilmour-penned guitar part on "Hope" on 1985's Whatever Happened to Jugula?, recorded when he was just 16. He played on Descendants of Smith (1988), for which he co-wrote "Laughing Inside", and on Once (1990), Death or Glory? (1992), and The Dream Society (1998). He has also toured several times with his father, and is heard on the live albums In Between Every Line (1986), Unhinged (1993) and Royal Festival Hall Live – June 10th 2001. His participation in Roy Harper's 2001 Autumn UK tour was cancelled after he broke his arm. Andy Roberts deputised.

He was a touring member of British pop/rock band Squeeze from 1996–97 and played on one track on their 1998 Domino album. Glenn Tilbrook of the band produced Nick's Smithereens and Harperspace albums, which were released on Tilbrook's Quixotic record label. The pair often work together, with Harper most recently appearing on Tilbrook's 2004 solo album Transatlantic Ping-Pong.

He has played lead guitar and sang backing vocals, as well as playing support, at a number of Cy Curnin solo gigs in the USA and elsewhere since the pair met in 2007.

Harper has written and played with Brighton-based political indie group The Levellers. He guested on the band's Top 40 UK single 'Make U Happy' – he co-wrote and played and sang on B-side 'Not in My Name'.

In 2014 Harper worked with Lana Del Rey on her cover of 'Chelsea Hotel No. 2' by Leonard Cohen.

== Discography ==
=== Studio albums ===
- Seed (Sangraal, 1995)
- Smithereens (Quixotic, 1998)
- Harperspace (Quixotic, 2000)
- Blood Songs (Sangraal, 2004)
- Treasure Island (Sangraal, 2005)
- Miracles for Beginners (Sangraal, 2007)
- The Last Guitar (Sangraal, 2010)
- Riven (Sangraal, 2013)
- Nix (Sangraal, 2014)
- Lies! Lies! Lies! (Sangraal, 2017)
- Phantastes (Sangraal, 2020)
- Tempus Fugitive (Sangraal, 2023)
- Earth Day Blue (Sangraal, 2024)

=== Live albums ===
- Double Life (Quixotic, 2002) – double album
- Hark! (Sangraal, 2015)
- 58 Fordwych Road (Sangraal, 2025)

=== Singles, EPs and download-only releases ===
- Light at the End of the Kennel EP (Sangraal, 1994)
- Instrumental EP (Sangraal, 1999)
- "Blue Sky Thinking" download single (Sangraal, 2007)
- Instrumental 2010 (2010) – re-recorded / re-mixed version of the 1999 release, download only

=== DVDs ===
- Love Is Music (Sangraal, 2007)
