= Miracles for Beginners =

Miracles For Beginners

Studio album by Nick Harper
- Released: 2007
- Genre: Folk rock
- Label: Sangraal
- Producer: Nick Harper

Nick Harper chronology
Treasure Island (2005)	Miracles For Beginners (2007)	The Last Guitar (2010)

Miracles for Beginners is the sixth studio album from UK singer-songwriter Nick Harper.

== Track listing ==
1. "Miracles for Beginners"
2. "Blue Sky Thinking"
3. "The Field of a Cloth of Gold"
4. "Magic Feather"
5. "Evo"
6. "2 Secs"
7. "Always"
8. "Your Love Has Saved Me from Myself"
9. "Communication"
10. "Simple"
