= Royal Festival Hall Live – June 10th 2001 =

Royal Festival Hall Live – 10 June 2001

Live album by Roy Harper
- Released: 2001
- Recorded: Royal Festival Hall, London
- Genre: Rock / Folk
- Length: Disc.1 58:39 Disc.2 75:19
- Label: Science Friction HUCD035
- Producer: Roy Harper

Roy Harper chronology
| The BBC Tapes - Volume VI (In Concert 1978 with Andy Roberts) (1997) | Royal Festival Hall Live – 10 June 2001 (2001) | Beyond the Door (DVD) (2005) |

Professional ratings
Review scores
| Source | Rating |
|---|---|
| Allmusic | link |

The Royal Festival Hall Live – 10 June 2001 is a live double album of English folk/rock singer-songwriter Roy Harper's 60th birthday concert at the Royal Festival Hall in London.

== Track listing ==
All songs were written by Roy Harper, except where noted.

=== Disc one ===
1. intro – 2:46
2. "Commune" – 5:01
3. intro – 0.19
4. "I'll See You Again" – 4:49
5. intro – 2:28
6. "Rushing Camelot" – 9:21
7. intro – 1:14
8. "North Country" – 5:32
9. intro – 2:11
10. "Another Day" – 3:33
11. intro – 2:42
12. "Hallucinating Light" – 6:24
13. "Same Old Rock" – 12:22

=== Disc two ===
1. intro – 3:34
2. "Sexy Woman" – 6:50
3. intro – 4:49
4. "Key To The Highway" (Broonzy) – 3:49
5. intro – 1:26
6. "Sophisticated Beggar" – 4:57
7. intro – 4:23
8. "Highway Blues" – 6:56
9. intro – 1:28
10. "Twelve Hours Of Sunset" – 5:26
11. intro – 1:10
12. "Me And My Woman" – 14:55
13. intro – 1:29
14. "The Flycatcher" – 5:27
15. intro – 1:07
16. "The Green Man" – 7:49

== Personnel ==
- Roy Harper – guitar, vocals

with

- David Bedford and the Bedford Strings (CD 1 – tracks 4, 8, 10; CD 2 – tracks 10, 12)
- Troy Donockley – whistles, Uilleann Pipes (CD 1 – track 6)
- Nick Harper – Guitar (CD 1 – track 12, 13; CD 2 – tracks 8, 12, 14)
- Jeff Martin – Guitar (CD 2 – track 2)
- John Renbourn – Guitar (CD 2 – tracks 4, 6)
- Andy Roberts – Guitar (CD 1 – track 10; CD 2 track 14)
- Ric Sanders – Fiddle (CD 2 – track 8)
