= Harperspace =

Studio album by Nick Harper
- Released: 2000
- Genre: Indie folk
- Label: Quixotic
- Producer: Glenn Tilbrook

Nick Harper chronology
Smithereens (1998)	Harperspace (2000)	Blood Songs (2004)

Professional ratings
Review scores
Source	Rating
AllMusic	3/5 stars
The Encyclopedia of Popular Music	4/5 stars

Harperspace is a 2000 album from UK singer-songwriter Nick Harper. It was produced by Glenn Tilbrook and released on Tilbrook's own Quixotic label.

== Critical reception ==
The Herald wrote that "with added instrumentation on disc, the rockier songs kick along and the more reflective material glows." The Guardian called the album Harper's "strongest yet, from the quirky lyricism of 'The Verse That Time Forgot' to the witty acoustic psychedelia of 'Aeroplane'."

== Track listing ==
1. "The Verse Time Forgot"
2. "Happy Man"
3. "Aeroplane"
4. "Karmageddon"
5. "Roomspin"
6. "There is Magic in this World"
7. "Nothing But Love"
8. "Watching The Stars"
9. "Kettledrum Heart"
10. "She Rules My World"
11. "Song of Madness"
12. "Before They Put Me in the Ground"

== Personnel ==
- Nick Harper - acoustic guitar, vocals
- Glenn Tilbrook - guitar, bass, keyboards, executive producer
- Andy Metcalfe, - bass, keyboards, engineering and mixing
- Ben Jones - bass, keyboards
- Ash Soan - drums
- Lawrence Davies - French horn
- Liquid Grooves, Shawn Lee - loops
- Paul Weston, Steve Cripps - "commotional approbatative spectrographics"
- Lily Harper - "supreme being"
