= God's Not Dead (film) =

2014 film by Harold Cronk

- Theatrical release poster
- Directed by: Harold Cronk
- Written by: Chuck Konzelman; Cary Solomon
- Story by: Chuck Konzelman; Cary Solomon; Hunter Dennis
- Based on: God's Not Dead: Evidence for God in an Age of Uncertainty by Rice Broocks
- Produced by: Michael Scott; Russell Wolfe; David A.R. White; Anna Zielinski; Elizabeth Travis
- Starring: Kevin Sorbo; Shane Harper; David A. R. White; Dean Cain; Newsboys; Willie Robertson; Korie Robertson
- Cinematography: Brian Shanley
- Edited by: Vance Null
- Music by: Jordan Breeding; Will Musser
- Production company: Pure Flix Entertainment
- Distributed by: Freestyle Releasing
- Release date: March 21, 2014
- Running time: 113 minutes
- Country: United States
- Language: English
- Budget: $2 million
- Box office: $64.7 million

God's Not Dead is a 2014 American Christian drama film directed by Harold Cronk and starring Kevin Sorbo, Shane Harper, David A. R. White, and Dean Cain. Inspired by Rice Broocks' book God's Not Dead: Evidence for God in an Age of Uncertainty, the film follows a Christian college student (Harper) whose faith is challenged by an atheist philosophy professor (Sorbo), who declares God a pre-scientific fiction. The film was produced by Pure Flix Entertainment in association with Check the Gate Productions, Red Entertainment Group, and Faith Family Films, and released theatrically on March 21, 2014, by Freestyle Releasing.

God's Not Dead was a commercial success, grossing over $64 million on a $2 million budget. Despite this, it was heavily panned by mainstream critics, who criticized its screenplay, Cronk's directing, performances, confrontational tone, characters, and use of straw man arguments and common stereotypes of atheists and non-Christians, instead of any actual debate.

The film successfully spawned a film series of the same name, consisting of four sequels.

== Plot ==
Josh Wheaton, a college student and evangelical Christian, enrolls in a philosophy class taught by Professor Jeffrey Radisson, a renowned atheist. On the first day, Radisson demands that his students sign a declaration stating "God is dead" in order to bypass what he calls the "tedious" theological debate. Josh is the only student who refuses. Radisson is willing to grant credit for this unit of course if Josh agrees to "defend the antithesis"—that God is not dead—in front of the class.

Josh's girlfriend Kara demands that Josh either sign the statement or drop Radisson's class, as standing up to Radisson will jeopardize their academic future. When Josh refuses, Kara breaks up with him. In the first two debates, Radisson has counter-arguments for all of Josh's points.

Radisson dates Mina, an evangelical whom he belittles in front of his fellow atheist colleagues. Her brother Mark, a successful businessman and atheist, refuses to visit their mother, who has dementia. Mark's girlfriend Amy is a left-wing blogger who writes articles critical of Duck Dynasty. When Amy is diagnosed with cancer, Mark dumps her. A Muslim student, Ayisha, secretly converts to Christianity and is disowned by her infuriated father when he finds out.

In the final debate, Josh halts his line of debate to ask Radisson: "Why do you hate God?" Radisson explodes in rage, confirming he hates God for his mother's death. Josh asks Radisson how he can hate someone that does not exist. Martin, a Chinese student whose father forbids him from talking about God to avoid jeopardizing his brother's chance at overseas study, stands up and says, "God's not dead." Most of the class follows Martin's lead, and Radisson leaves the room in defeat.

Josh invites Martin to attend a Newsboys concert. Mark finally visits his mother but mocks her for her faith. She responds that his financial success was given to him by Satan to keep him from turning to God; then, she does not remember his name. Amy confronts the Newsboys in their dressing room but asks them to help guide her in converting to Christianity. Radisson reads a letter from his late mother and is moved to reconcile with Mina. On his way to find Mina, Radisson is struck by a car and fatally injured. A pastor waiting at the intersection tends to Radisson and helps him come clean of his sins and regain his religious faith as he dies.

At the concert, the Newsboys show a video clip of Willie Robertson congratulating Josh on standing up to Radisson and encouraging the audience to text "God's Not Dead" as a message to others. The Newsboys then begin to play their song "God's Not Dead", dedicating it to Josh.

== Cast ==
- Shane Harper as Josh Wheaton, an evangelical Christian college student
- Kevin Sorbo as Professor Jeffrey Radisson, Josh's philosophy class teacher and a self-professed atheist
- David A. R. White as Reverend Dave, the pastor of St. James Church
- Trisha LaFache as Amy Ryan, an atheist blogger who is diagnosed with cancer
- Hadeel Sittu as Ayisha, a Muslim student who secretly converts to Christianity
- Marco Khan as Misrab, Ayisha's estranged father, who finds out about her conversion
- Cory Oliver as Mina, Professor Radisson's girlfriend and an evangelical Christian
- Dean Cain as Mark, a greedy and selfish atheist businessman, Mina's older brother, and Amy's boyfriend
- Jim Gleason as Ward Wheaton
- Benjamin Onyango as Reverend Jude, a Christian minister from Ghana and Dave's best friend
- Cassidy Gifford as Kara, Josh's girlfriend
- Paul Kwo as Martin Yip, a foreign exchange student and Josh's best friend who becomes a Christian
- Newsboys as themselves
- Willie Robertson as himself, the host of Duck Dynasty
- Korie Robertson as herself, Willie's wife
- Alex Arstidis as Fahid, Ayisha's younger brother
- Lenore Banks as the mother of Mina and Mark, a Christian with dementia
- Franklin Graham as himself (voice only)

== Inspirations ==
The film's script was inspired by lawsuits involving the place of the Christian faith in universities and by the book God's Not Dead: Evidence for God in an Age of Uncertainty published by Pastor Rice Broocks.

== Production ==
The film was shot from October to November 2012, in Baton Rouge, Louisiana, with the concert scene done in Houston, Texas. However, exterior shots of the concert were filmed at Staples Center.

The film soundtrack was released on March 3, 2014, by Inpop Records.

For the 10th anniversary, an extended cut of the film (which runs at 128 minutes) was released on home media.

== Reception ==
=== Box office ===
The film became a surprise success at the box office. In its first weekend of release, the film earned $9.2 million with an $11,816 per-screen average from 780 theaters, causing Entertainment Weekly's Adam Markovitz to refer to it as "the biggest surprise of the weekend". During that weekend, it finished third behind Divergent and Muppets Most Wanted at the box office.

The film began its international roll-out in Mexico on April 4, 2014, where the movie grossed $89,021 its opening weekend. God's Not Dead grossed $60.8 million in North America and $3.9 million in other territories for a total of $64.7 million, against a budget of $2 million. At the end of 2014, God's Not Dead was ranked 93rd in terms of worldwide gross, and finished with $64.7 million worldwide.

=== Critical reception ===
On the review aggregator Rotten Tomatoes the film received 13% positive reviews, based on 24 reviews, with an average rating of 3.20/10. The consensus reads, "Deploying sledgehammer theatrics instead of delivering its message with a dose of good faith, God's Not Dead makes for bad drama and an unconvincing argument to the unconverted." On Metacritic, the film received a score of 16 out of 100, based on six critics, indicating "overwhelming dislike".

Elaine Wilkinson criticized the film for presenting a narrative based on a Christian persecution complex in the United States, specifically the idea of colleges as "atheist factories", a premise criticized as an inaccurate stereotype by Emma Green, writing for The Atlantic. Writing for The A.V. Club, Emily St. James gave the film a "D−", saying, "Even by the rather lax standards of the Christian film industry, God's Not Dead is a disaster. It's an uninspired amble past a variety of Christian-email-forward bogeymen that feels far too long at just 113 minutes". Reviewer Scott Foundas of Variety wrote "... even grading on a generous curve, this strident melodrama about the insidious efforts of America's university system to silence true believers on campus is about as subtle as a stack of Bibles falling on your head ..." Some sources and blogs have cited the film's similarities to a popular urban legend.

=== Evangelical and Roman Catholic response ===
The Alliance Defending Freedom, American Heritage Girls, Faith Driven Consumer, Denison Forum on Truth and Culture, Trevecca Nazarene University, The Dove Foundation and Ratio Christi have all endorsed the film.

Dave Hartline of The American Catholic gave God's Not Dead a positive review and hoped that other films like it would follow. Vincent Funaro of The Christian Post praised the film for being "a hit for believers and may even appeal to skeptics searching for answers".

Evangelical Michael Gerson, however, was highly critical of the film and its message, writing "The main problem with God's Not Dead is not its cosmology or ethics but its anthropology. It assumes that human beings are made out of cardboard. Academics are arrogant and cruel. Liberal bloggers are preening and snarky. Unbelievers disbelieve because of personal demons. It is characterization by caricature." John Mulderig echoed similar concerns in his review for the Catholic News Service, stating: "There might be the kernel of an intriguing documentary buried within director Harold Cronk's stacked-deck drama, given the extent of real-life academic hostility toward religion. But even faith-filled moviegoers will sense the claustrophobia of the echo chamber within which this largely unrealistic picture unfolds."

== Sequels ==
Pure Flix Entertainment produced a sequel, God's Not Dead 2, with a release date of April 1, 2016. A second sequel, God's Not Dead: A Light in Darkness, was released on March 30, 2018. A third sequel, God's Not Dead: We the People, was released on October 4, 2021. David A. R. White, Paul Kwo, Trisha LaFache, and Benjamin Onyango reprise their roles in the second film. However, in the third film, only David A. R. White and Benjamin Onyango reprise their roles, with Shane Harper also reprising his role as Josh Wheaton from the first film. In the fourth film, David A. R. White, Benjamin Onyango, and Paul Kwo reprised their roles. A fourth sequel, God's Not Dead: In God We Trust, was released on September 12, 2024.

== See also ==
- Kitzmiller v. Dover Area School District, a case where creationism was prevented from being taught in science classes.
