= Jane Velez-Mitchell =

American television journalist

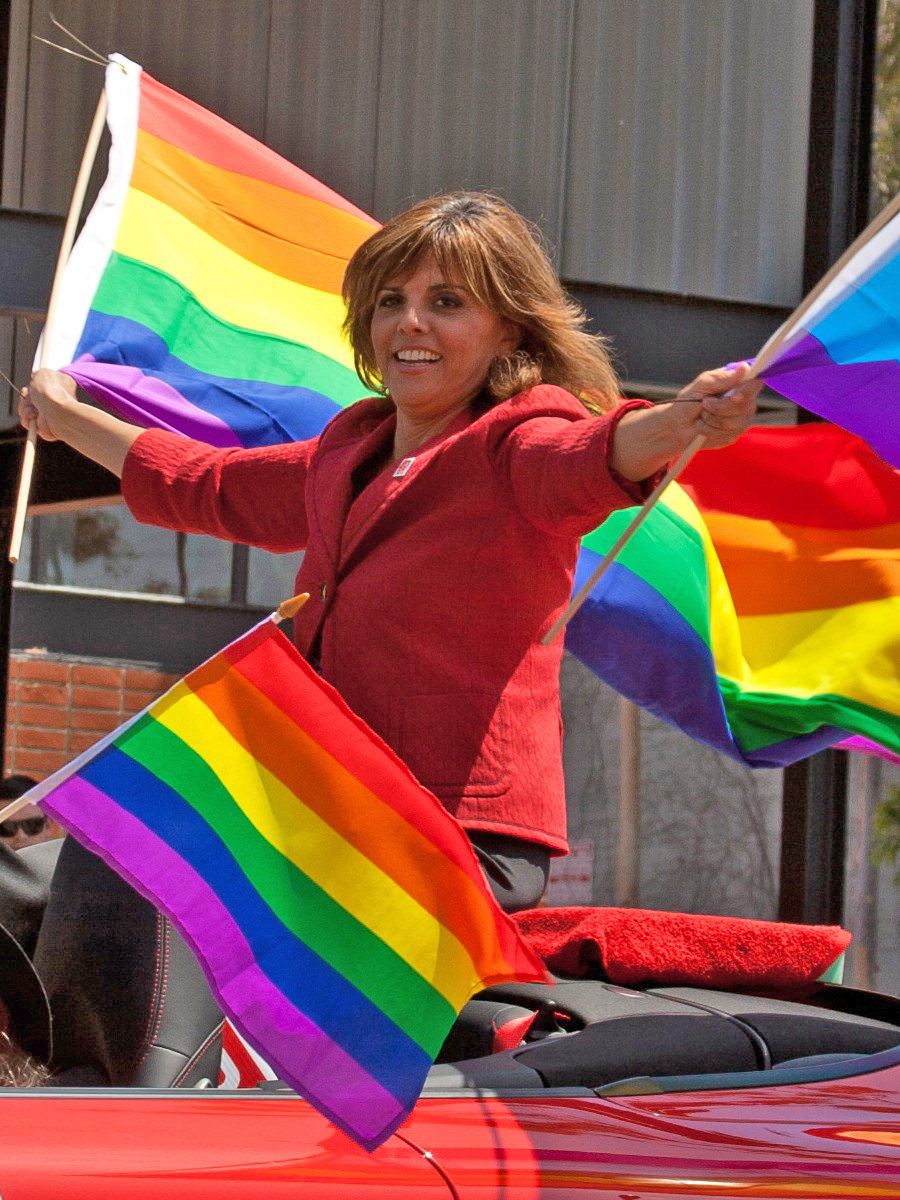
- Velez-Mitchell at the 2010 Gay Pride Parade in West Hollywood, California
- Born: 1955 or 1956 (age 69–70); New York City, U.S.
- Education: New York University
- Occupations: Television and social media journalist, author
- Website: www.janevelezmitchell.com

Jane Velez-Mitchell is an American television and social media journalist and author with specialties in vegan lifestyles, animal rights, addiction, and social justice. She is a New York Times bestselling author, former CNN Headline News (HLN) host, and founder of UnchainedTV.

== Early life ==
Velez-Mitchell was born to a Puerto Rican mother and an Irish American father. She graduated from New York University with a BA in Broadcast Journalism in 1977.

== Career ==
=== Early years ===
She began her career as a reporter at WCBS-TV in New York, billed at the time as Jane Mitchell. She made the decision to add "Velez" to her name after covering the New York City Puerto Rican Day Parade.

In early 1990, Velez-Mitchell was a co-anchor alongside Jerry Dunphy on the debut of a three-hour news broadcast on KCAL-TV, a local Los Angeles TV station. She also made anchor appearances on KCAL-TV sister station KCBS-TV. Other hosting duties included talk radio KABC (AM), Los Angeles.

=== 2008–2014: HLN ===
From 2008 to 2014, she hosted her own show on HLN, Jane Velez-Mitchell (formerly known as Issues with Jane Velez-Mitchell) replacing Glenn Beck, who moved to Fox News Channel. As a former CNN journalist, Velez-Mitchell has often commented on high-profile cases for CNN, TruTV, E! and other national cable TV shows. Velez-Mitchell guest hosted for Nancy Grace on her Headline News show. Velez-Mitchell reported for the nationally syndicated show Celebrity Justice (produced by corporate sibling Telepictures) until 2005. She also appears as a substitute host on HLN's Showbiz Tonight. In October 2014, HLN's Jane Velez-Mitchell show was cancelled.

While covering a story regarding sororities on her television show Issues with Jane Velez-Mitchell (retitled in February 2012 as simply Jane Velez-Mitchell), she stated that she attended New York University. She was in the courtroom during the entire child sexual abuse trial against singer Michael Jackson. During the trial, Velez-Mitchell appeared daily on Nancy Grace. She featured on CNN's Larry King Live on several occasions, including on the evening of the verdict. In November 2014, she founded JaneUnchained, a social media news outlet that focuses on social justice.

=== 2014–present: UnchainedTV ===
In November 2014, she founded JaneUnchained, a digital news network for animal rights and the vegan lifestyle which uses more than 60 volunteer contributors from around the world to showcase vegan festivals, animal rights conferences, organizations, vegan restaurants and cooking. The videos originate on Velez-Mitchell's Facebook page. The network is a 501 c (3) non profit based in Marina del Rey, California. In 2019, JaneUnChained (in conjunction with Eamonn McCrystal's "Inspired.") launched "New Day New Chef", a vegan cooking series for Amazon Prime Video.

She is co-executive producer and host of New Day New Chef. This vegan cooking series has won two Taste Awards, considered the Oscars of food and streams on Amazon Prime and UnchainedTV, and has aired on local public television stations across the US through NETA. Also that year JaneUnChained released its first documentary "Countdown to Year Zero" featuring Dr. Sailesh Rao. The award-winning documentary Countdown to Year Zero, is now streaming on Amazon Prime and UnchainedTV. Countdown to Year Zero has won several awards.

UnchainedTV streams Pig Little Lies, an UnchainedTV Original Series, made with Eamonn McCrystal.

In 2022, JaneUnchained was re-branded as UnchainedTV, with Velez-Mitchell as managing editor.

== Books ==
Velez-Mitchell wrote the non-fiction Secrets Can Be Murder: What America’s Most Sensational Crimes Tell Us About Ourselves, in 2007. The book's premise is that by studying the secrecy and deceit in more than twenty widely covered murder cases, we can learn to opt for honesty in our own lives and avoid similar outcomes.

In September 2009, Velez-Mitchell released her memoir on addiction recovery, iWant: My Journey from Addiction and Overconsumption to a Simpler, Honest Life.

In February 2011, Velez-Mitchell released a third book, titled Addict Nation: an Intervention for America. This book examines what Velez-Mitchell believes to be growing levels of addiction in the United States to both illegal drugs and to legal phenomena like the Internet, prescription drugs, and fast food.

Velez-Mitchell's fourth book, Exposed: The Secret Life of Jodi Arias, was released in August 2013 and debuted at #5 on the New York Times Bestseller list. The book examines the life of Jodi Arias, leading up to her murder of her ex-boyfriend, and the ensuing murder trial.

== Personal life ==
Velez-Mitchell is a lesbian. She came out on Al Rantel's radio show on KABC-AM in Los Angeles in 2007. She also has dedicated her time and resources to various charitable and humane causes. She is well known for her animal rights advocacy and is a vegan and an environmentalist.

== Awards ==
In 2001, she received the Gracie Allen Award from the Foundation of American Women in Radio and Television.

In July 2009, Farm Animal Rights Movement awarded Velez-Mitchell the Celebrity Animal Activist Award at the Animal Rights 2009 National Conference held in Los Angeles, California. While working at Celebrity Justice, Velez-Mitchell’s reporting on animal cruelty earned that show two Genesis Awards from the Humane Society of the United States. She earned an additional Genesis Award for her show "Issues" in 2010 and the same year the VegNews magazine named her Media Maven of the Year. In 2013, Mercy for Animals awarded her their Compassionate Leadership Award. In 2014, she was honored for fighting animal abuse by the Animal Legal Defense Fund. In 2015, she received the Nanci Alexander Award at PETA's 35th anniversary celebration.

In January 2010, she was awarded the Ruby Award by Soroptimist International for her "War on Women" coverage on her television show.

In 1993, Velez-Mitchell won a Los Angeles Emmy for her reporting at KCAL-TV; in 1989, she shared a New York Emmy for her reporting at WCBS-TV.
