= J. Warner Wallace =

American homicide detective and Christian apologist

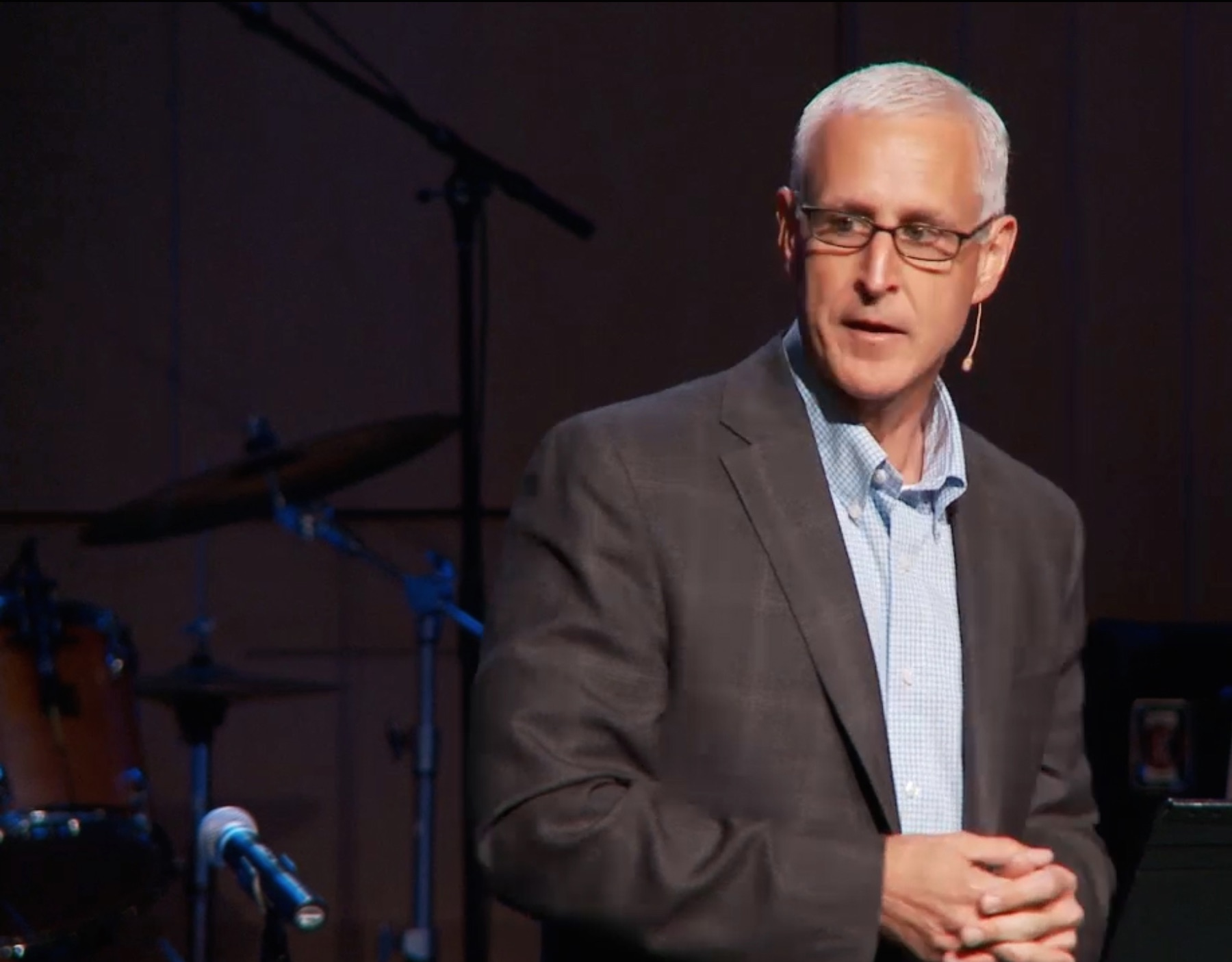
- Born: James Warner Wallace; June 16, 1961 (age 65); Torrance, California, U.S.
- Education: California State University at Long Beach; University of California, Los Angeles; Los Angeles Sheriff's Academy; Golden Gate Baptist Theological Seminary
- Occupations: Homicide detective, Christian apologist, author, pastor
- Writing career
- Subject: Christian apologetics
- Website: coldcasechristianity.com

James Warner Wallace (born June 16, 1961) is an American homicide detective and Christian apologist. Wallace is a Senior Fellow at the Colson Center for Christian Worldview and an adjunct professor of Apologetics at Talbot School of Theology (Biola University) in La Mirada, California. He has authored several books, including Person of Interest, Cold-Case Christianity, God's Crime Scene, and Forensic Faith, in which he applies principles of cold case homicide investigation to apologetic concerns such as the existence of God and the reliability of the Gospels. He has been featured as a cold case homicide expert on Fox 11 Los Angeles, truTV (formerly Court TV), and NBC.

== Life and work ==
Wallace was born in Torrance, California. He graduated from the Los Angeles Sheriff's Explorer Academy in 1978 (earning the Honor Cadet award). From there he went on to pursue a career in the arts, earning a bachelor's degree in design from California State University at Long Beach and a master's degree in architecture from the University of California, Los Angeles (UCLA). In 1988, Wallace returned to law enforcement, attending the Los Angeles Sheriff's Academy as a recruit for the Torrance Police Department (graduating again as the Honor Cadet). During his law enforcement career, Wallace served in a number of assignments, including the Metro Unit, Gang Detail, SWAT, Special Investigations Division, and Robbery / Homicide. He was also one of the founding members of the Torrance Police Department's Cold-Case Homicide Unit.

=== Investigative work ===
J. Warner Wallace first began investigating cold-case homicides as a collateral interest while assigned to his agency's Special Investigations Division. He applied a technique known as Forensic Statement Analysis to the transcripts of a confession from an early suspect in the 1972 murder of Teri Lynn Hollis. This case had been suspended and was unassigned, and the suspect had been eliminated in 1974 (despite his confession) due to what was considered exculpatory evidence at the time. Wallace re-examined this exculpatory evidence along with the suspect's statement and agreed the confession was false, concluding the suspect was not involved in the murder. Wallace retained an interest in the case, however, and eventually carved time to examine every piece of evidence collected over the years. During this process, Wallace discovered a previously unknown biological evidence sample. Believing this sample contained DNA from the true killer, Wallace submitted the evidence to the CODIS database for sexual offenders. It failed to match anyone in the national registry, and the case remained unsolved until ancestry DNA technology became available to the agency in 2017.

During this period, Wallace continued to investigate cold-cases as a collateral duty while assigned to the Intelligence Detail and the Robbery Desk. Two of these cases were eventually solved and the suspects were convicted. The collateral success of these cases led the Torrance Police Department to form a full-time Cold-Case Homicide Detail. Wallace was selected as one of two founding members. His cases have been featured on Dateline (NBC) and North Mission Road (truTV).

Wallace earned the Sustained Superiority Award from the South Bay Police and Fire Medal of Valor committee. In 2015 the Cold Case Investigation Unit of the Torrance Police Department won the California Peace Officer Association COPSWEST Award for best solved cold case.

=== Conversion to Christianity ===
In 1996, Wallace became a Christian at the age of 35, after investigating the gospels as potential eyewitness accounts to the life of Jesus using his detective expertise. Wallace attended and eventually joined the staff of Saddleback Church. He later enrolled in the Golden Gate Baptist Theological Seminary master's program in theological studies, while serving as a youth pastor at Rock Hills Church and later as a lead pastor for an organization called the Rising Tide.

=== Christian apologetics ===
Wallace began applying the principles of cold-case homicide investigation to Christian apologetics. He has written six books addressing the evidence for Christianity: Person of Interest, The Truth in True Crime, Cold-Case Christianity, Alive, God's Crime Scene, and Forensic Faith. Wallace has been a guest on a number of television programs, including The 700 Club (CBN), Praise The Lord (TBN), 100 Huntley Street (Crossroads), He has spoken on several radio broadcasts, including The Laura Ingraham Show, The Eric Metaxas Show, The Janet Mefferd Show, and In the Market with Janet Parshall.

== Books ==
- Cold-Case Christianity: A Homicide Detective Investigates the Claims of the Gospels. Wallace presents 10 principles of cold-case homicide cases and uses them to investigate the claims of the New Testament gospels.
- God's Crime Scene: A Cold-Case Detective Examines the Evidence for a Divinely Created Universe. Wallace examines eight lines of evidence in what he calls the "crime scene of the universe," arguing they point to the existence of God.
- Forensic Faith: A Homicide Detective Makes the Case for a More Reasonable, Evidential Christian Faith. Wallace examines the evidentiary history of Christianity, teaching Christians to accept their duty, begin training, learn how to investigate and communicate the Christian worldview.
- Alive: A Cold-Case Approach to the Resurrection. Wallace investigates the accounts of the resurrection of Christ and argues that there is evidence to believe them.
- Cold-Case Christianity for Kids: Investigate Jesus with a Real Detective. Wallace provides a mystery for readers to solve while explaining how to test witnesses, examine the evidence, and investigate the case for Christianity.
- God's Crime Scene for Kids: Investigate Creation with a Real Detective. Wallace provides a mystery for readers to solve while exploring the evidence in Creation that points to God's existence.
- Forensic Faith for Kids: Learn to Share the Truth from a Real Detective. Wallace provides a mystery for readers to solve while encouraging kids to develop a more reasonable faith.
- So the Next Generation Will Know: Preparing Young Christians for a Challenging World. Wallace (along with co-author Sean McDowell) helps parents, youth leaders, and Christian teachers train the next generation with a Christian worldview.
- Person of Interest: Why Jesus Still Matters in a World that Rejects the Bible. Wallace examines the impact of Jesus by investigating the case like a "no body" murder.
- The Truth in True Crime: What Investigating Death Teaches Us About the Meaning of Life. Wallace provides 15 rules for life learned from death investigations.
- CASE FILES: Murder and Meaning. A graphic novel with robust and unique graphic illustrations and a thought-provoking storyline.

== Television and movies ==
Wallace has appeared in several television productions and news broadcasts. His cold cases have been featured on Dateline (NBC). he has also been featured on North Mission Road (TruTV, formerly CourtTV). He appeared several times as a homicide consultant on Behind the Screams (Reelz Network). Wallace has hosted a weekly television show, Cold-Case Christianity (NRBtv), and appeared in God's Not Dead 2 (PureFlix).

== Dateline appearances ==
- "Deadly Triangle". This episode describes the murder of Archie McFarland.
- "The Night Before Halloween". This show features the murder of Robin Hoynes.
- "Secrets in the Mist". This episode describes the murder of Carol Lubahn.
- "The Wire". This two-hour show features the murder of Lynne Knight.
- "The Threat". This Dateline episode features a case from 1988. It describes the murder of Barbara "Joan" Bradford who was shot to death in her home.
- "The Murder of Teri Hollis". This Dateline web special features a case J. Warner Wallace's father originally investigated involving a young girl who was murdered in Torrance in 1972.

== Personal life ==
Wallace is married to Susie who has been his co-author and editor. They have four children and live in Southern California.
