= Benjamin Onyango =

Kenyan actor

- Born: Benjamin Alfred Onyango Ochieng; May 18, 1960 (age 66); Nairobi, Kenya
- Education: United States International University Africa; United States International University; California State University, Stanislaus
- Occupations: Actor, musician
- Years active: 1999–present

Benjamin Alfred Onyango Ochieng, is a Kenyan born-American actor, particularly active in Hollywood film industry. He is best known for the roles in the films Tears of the Sun, God's Not Dead and Beautifully Broken.

== Personal life ==
He was born in Ofafa Jericho Estate in Eastlands, Nairobi, Kenya, as the second child in a family of seven brothers. His father was Christopher Ochieng and mother was Eudiah Achieng Ochieng. Benjamin started his primary education in Ofafa Jericho Primary School then Ofafa Jericho Secondary School. When Benjamin turned 18, he was hired by his father at British American Tobacco Kenya Ltd (BAT) and later he was moved to a clerk position in the Wages Department where he worked for 4 years. Then he was transferred to computer department and worked for two years.

He later joined the United States International University (USIU) to study Management Information Systems (MIT). For further studies, Onyango moved to the USIU, San Diego in the United States. From there, he transferred to California State University, Stanislaus in Turlock, California, graduating in 1992 with a Bachelor of Science Degree in Computer Science.

== Career ==
After graduation, he relocated to Hollywood, California, where he further studied music and acting. He worked with Funk Rock band 'P.F.O.' for few years later decided to be a professional actor. With this thought, he started to appear in many feature films and popular American television serials such as General Hospital, The Shield and The X-files in 1999. Meanwhile, he starred in The God’s Not Dead Trilogy franchise as well as Tears of the Sun, Heavenly Deposit, Beautifully Broken, Father Africa, The Boy, Road to Redemption, Default, Kwame, Chains, Thunder Chance, The Disciple, American Crude and The Terminal.

He also became a voice actor and rendered his voice to the films and television serials including; Last Face, Furious 7, Constantine, Night At the Museum I & III, Machine Gun Preacher, Inception, The Day the Earth Stood Still, Primeval, League of Extraordinary Gentlemen, The Path to 911, Mighty Joe Young and E-ring.

Apart from acting, he is also a writer with popular writing credits include: The Wives (TV series); Dysfunctionally Organized (Web Series); Mind Tricks and Curse of Devil’s Mountain (Shorts), Cheza and Original Man (Films).

== Filmography ==
Year	Film	Role	Genre	Ref.
1999	The X-Files	Second African Man	TV series	
2003	Tears of the Sun	Colonel Emanuel Okeze	Film	
2004	The Terminal	African Man with Wife and Child	Film	
2005	The Shield	Store Clerk	TV series	
2006	General Hospital	Father	TV series	
2007	The Anatolian	Security Officer	Film	
2008	The Disciple	Doctor	Film	
2008	American Crude	Toomy	Film	
2008	Kwame	Kwame Opoku	Short film	
2009	Chains	Buhle	Short film	
2009	Resident Evil 5	Majini	Video game	
2010	Thunder Chance	General	Short film	
2010	Mind Tricks	Joe Manning	Short film	
2011	Resident Evil: The Mercenaries 3D	Majini	Film	
2011	Curse of Devil's Mountain	Mr. Dean	Short film	
2011	Bosco's Guitar	Radio Announcer & Male Attackers (voice)	Short film	
2012	Chapter One	Mao Aka Bendrix	Short film	
2013	MISSInformed	Father	Short film	
2013	Trusts and Estates	Waiter	Documentary short	
2014	God's Not Dead	Reverend Jude	Film	
2014	Default	Edward	Film	
2014	Hollywood Street	Salem	Film	
2015	The Boy	The Healer	Short film	
2015	The Other Tribes	Onyango	Film	
2015	The Black Pot	Guest	TV series	
2016	Madame Esmeralda and the Audition	Benvolio	Film	
2016	God's Not Dead 2	Reverend Jude	Film	
2016	Dysfunctionally Organized	Street Preacher	TV series	
2016	Road to Redemption	Tribal Councilman 2	Film	
2017	Oscar	Samuel Braxton	Film	
2017	Father Africa	Dr. Haki	Film	
2018	God's Not Dead: A Light in Darkness	Reverend Jude	Film	
2018	Beautifully Broken	William Mwizerwa	Film	
2018	A Minor Variation	Figs	Short film	
2019	Godforsaken	Ezekiel	Film	
2019	Freshman Year	Chukwumah	Film	
2019	Heavenly Deposit	Nigel	Film	
2019	The Wives	Otieno	TV series	
2021	God's Not Dead: We the People	Reverend Jude	Film	
2023	Where The River Divides	Baba Dennis	Film	
TBD	My Friend	James Ellis	Film	

== See also ==
- List of Black Sails characters
