= Jane Velez-Mitchell (TV program) =

- Genre: Current affairs program
- Presented by: Jane Velez-Mitchell
- Country of origin: United States
- Original language: English

Production
- Production location: New York City
- Camera setup: Multi-camera
- Running time: 60 minutes

Original release
- Network: HLN
- Release: October 17, 2008 – October 13, 2014

Jane Velez-Mitchell was a current affairs gossip TV show on HLN hosted by Jane Velez-Mitchell. It aired weeknights at 7 pm ET. It debuted as Issues with Jane Velez-Mitchell in October 2008 before rebranding as simply Jane Velez Mitchell in February 2012. Velez-Mitchell previously worked for HLN's Nancy Grace as producer and fill-in host, and continued to function in the fill-in capacity until her departure in late 2014.

The show is known for its strong opinions on what it reports. According to the show's website, the program "stands up for the less fortunate and demands justice for all." The show spotlit many issues, such as homicides, celebrity controversies, political controversies, cold cases, and other "hot topics." The show normally had a panel of five or six guests, along with Velez-Mitchell.

In 2010, Issues with Jane Velez-Mitchell was nominated for a GLAAD Media Award for "Outstanding TV Journalism Segment" for the segment "Gay Teen Mutilated" during the 21st GLAAD Media Awards.

The show was retitled as simply Jane Velez-Mitchell in February 2012, with Velez-Mitchell jokingly explaining that the change was due to her having gotten over her "issues".

Velez-Mitchell was also a substitute host on HLN's Showbiz Tonight.

On October 14, 2014, the program was unexpectedly canceled by CNN as part of continuing budget cuts across the entire organization under the "Turner 2020" reorganization initiative, with the day before's program being the last to air. As with nearly all of the program removals over the last year on HLN, Forensic Files repeats are expected to fill the timeslot.
