= Eamonn McCrystal =

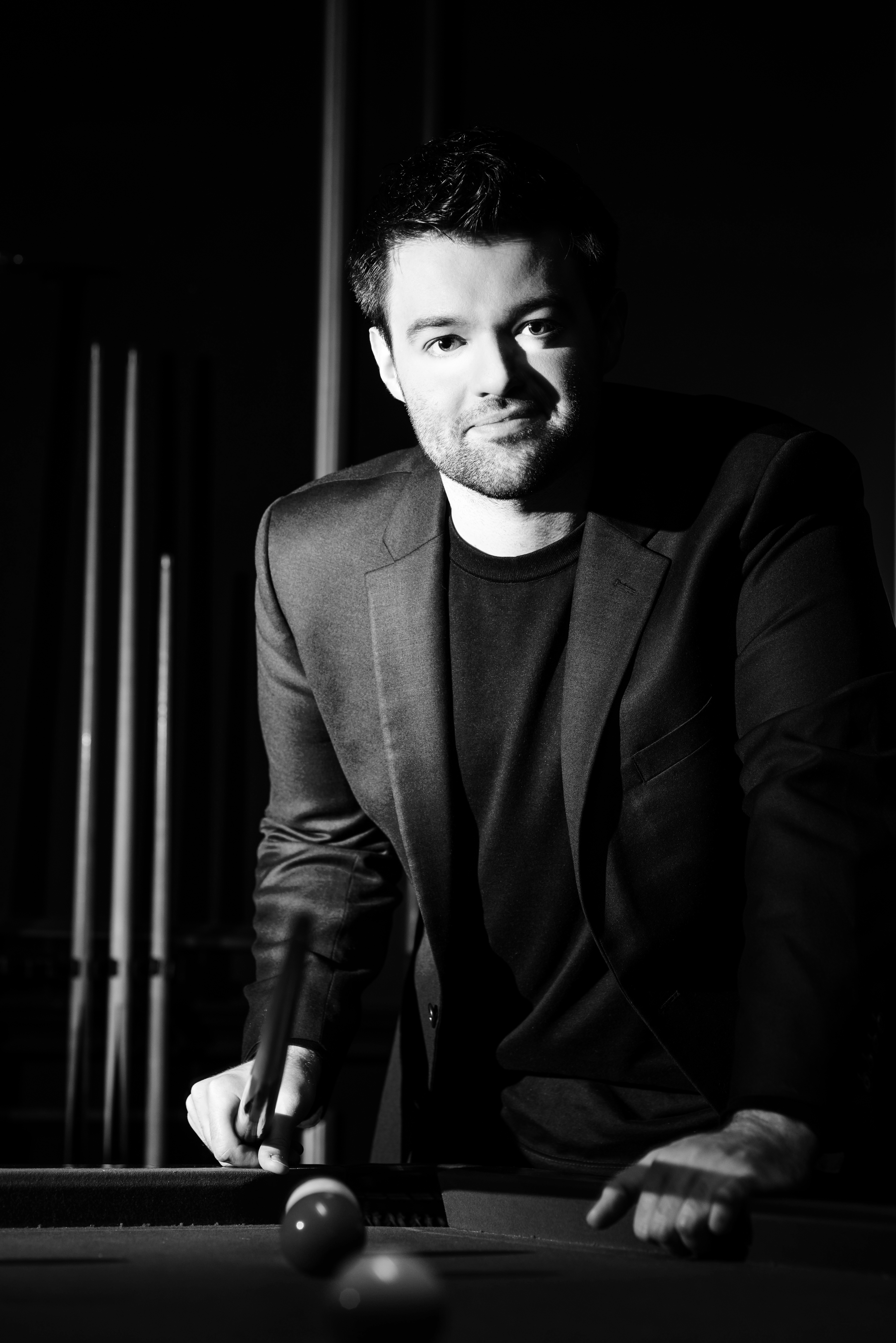
- McCrystal in Belfast, 2016

Background information
- Born: 1 June 1987 (age 39); Cookstown, Northern Ireland
- Genres: Pop, easy listening, vocal, traditional vocal pop
- Occupations: TV producer, Singer, Actor, TV host
- Instruments: Vocals, piano, flute
- Years active: 2000–present
- Labels: Universal Music Group, Capitol, Hedgehog Records
- Website: eamonn.net

Eamonn McCrystal (born 1 June 1987) is a multi-Emmy Award winning Northern Irish TV producer and pop tenor based in Los Angeles, California.

== Early life ==
McCrystal was born to Jim and Ann McCrystal, nursing home owners, in Cookstown, County Tyrone, Northern Ireland. He attended Holy Trinity College in Cookstown, where he learned to play the piano and the flute. In his late teen years, he seriously considered joining the priesthood, but was advised by local cardinal Sean Brady to pursue his music career instead. He studied to be a teacher of Religious Education and English at St Mary's University College, Belfast before moving to London, England to pursue a career in Media.

== Career ==
=== Early career ===
McCrystal's debut radio broadcast was at the age of nine, on the George Jones Show on BBC Radio Ulster. He released his first album, After the Storm, in 2000, at the age of 13. Over the course of the decade, he independently recorded three more albums, and toured around Ireland with a 15-piece band.

=== Move to U.S. ===
In 2009, McCrystal was working as a stage manager at the UTV Country Fest in Belfast, headlined that year by Randy Travis. McCrystal was driving Travis's then-wife and manager Elizabeth Travis to Dublin, and gave her a copy of Eamonn McCrystal Live. After listening to the album, she gave McCrystal a slot as a guest artist on the Randy Travis tour, signed him to a contract with Elizabeth Travis Management, and brought him to Los Angeles, where he is currently based.

In 2011, McCrystal recorded his first US album, When in Nashville..., produced by Kyle Lehning, composed of six covers and six original compositions by outside songwriters. Later that year, McCrystal sang with Randy Travis on "Someone You Never Knew" on his album Anniversary Celebration. In 2012, McCrystal released the single "Under Your Wings," a ballad written by Walter Afanasieff. McCrystal's musical director Brad Ellis accompanies him on the track.

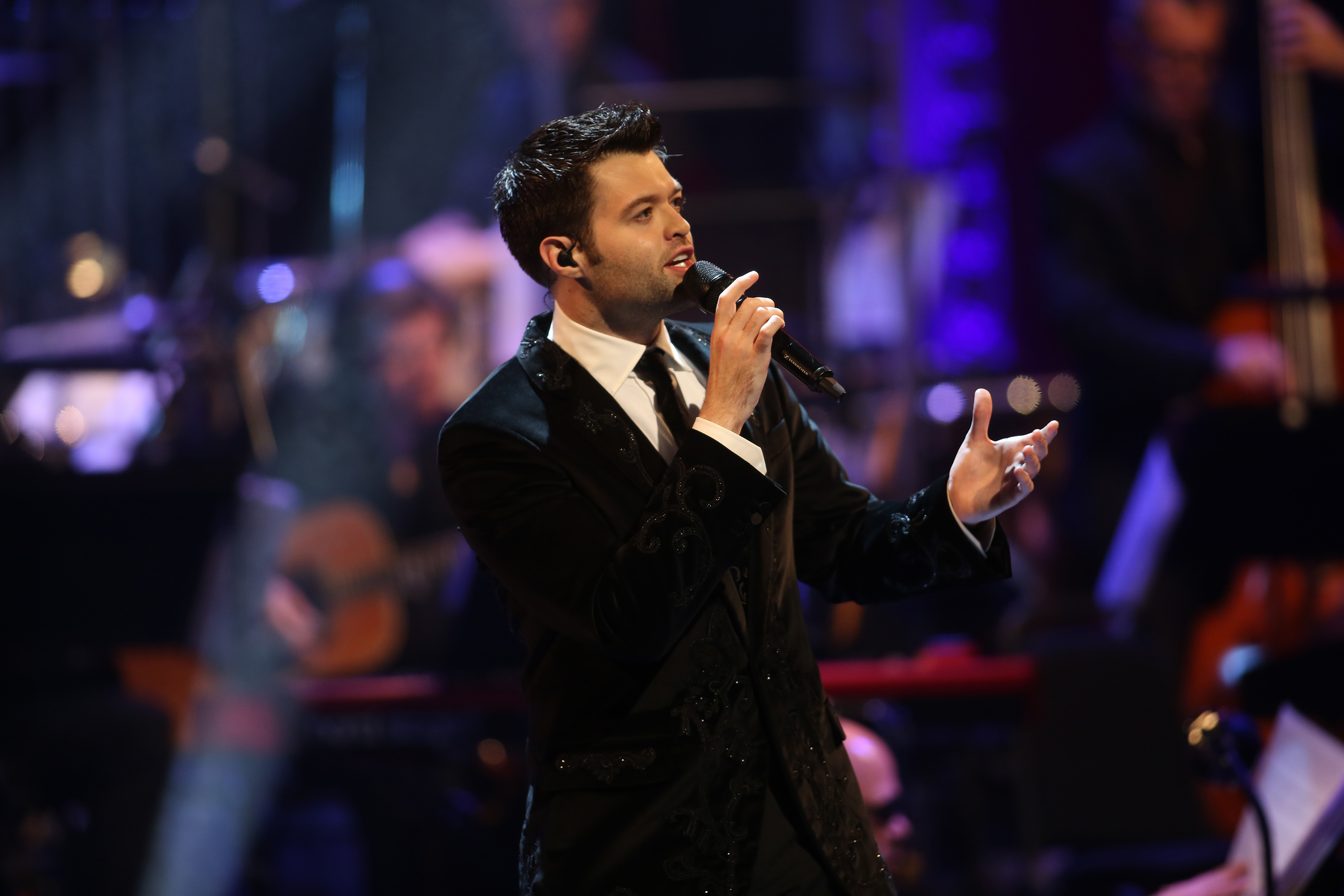
McCrystal performs in Belfast in 2014.

In 2013, McCrystal released The Music of Christmas & the Stories Behind the Songs, an album of Christmas songs produced by Nigel Wright.

On 2 September 2014, his album A Living Prayer was released by Difference Media / UMG. Produced by McCrystal and Casey Wood, it contains traditional hymns and contemporary songs.

McCrystal and Woods co-produced the 2016 traditional vocal pop album And So It Goes which included performances by Rita Wilson and Chloe Agnew.

=== Television, film and radio ===
In 2008, McCrystal founded SMUC Radio, a radio station at St. Mary's University College in Twickenham, England, hosted by students and broadcast 24 hours a day. SMUC Radio debuted on 19 February 2009.

An Internet TV station, The Eamonn McCrystal Network, was launched on 10 October 2012.

On 6 September 2014, McCrystal hosted the made-for-television concert The Music of Northern Ireland at the Grand Opera House in Belfast. It was filmed by BBC Northern Ireland and aired on PBS in North America in March 2015. During the event, McCrystal sung duets with special guest artists including Brian Kennedy, Rachel Tucker, Keith Getty and Kristyn Getty. It won four 2015 NATAS Emmy Awards, with McCrystal winning for best On-Camera Talent/Performer, and as a co-producer for best Overall Arts/Entertainment program.

Eamonn is seen regularly on PBS Television with his concerts "The Music of Northern Ireland" (PBS) and "The Music of Christmas" (BBC/PBS) and on the BBC in the UK, most notably BBC Children In Need, Songs of Praise

McCrystal made an appearance in the 2014 film Big Stone Gap, directed by Adriana Trigiani and starring Ashley Judd, Patrick Wilson and Whoopi Goldberg. He also appeared in the 2016 film God's Not Dead 2, and guest-starred in the sitcom Hitting The Breaks.

On 13 December 2018, "The Music of Christmas with Eamonn McCrystal" was released on Amazon Prime Video.

In February 2020 Eamonn co-created, produced and directed an 8-part vegan cooking show "New Day New Chef" with Jane Velez-Mitchell which debuted on Amazon Prime Video and later aired on PBS. In June 2020 a stand-alone 6-part version of the show titled, "New Day New Chef : Support and Feed Edition" aired on Amazon Prime Video and featured Maggie Baird, Billie Eilish and Finneas. A third and final season of the original "New Day New Chef" series was released in October 2020.

In October 2020 Eamonn and his production company "Inspired." signed with The Gersh Agency for representation.

=== Production and showrunning ===
McCrystal has established himself as a television producer and showrunner. He is the owner of "Inspired," a production company based in Los Angeles, California. Through this company, McCrystal has created and produced a variety of television shows across different genres:

- "Hitmakers with David Foster" - A music-focused series featuring Grammy Award winning music producer David Foster.
- "The Library" - A documentary series featuring newsreels narrated by John Lithgow and Beau Bridges.
- "At Home with The Jenners" - A reality/cooking show offering an inside look at the lives of Cayley and Brandon Jenner.
- "New Day New Chef" - A plant-based vegan cooking show promoting healthy, sustainable eating hosted by Jane Velez-Mitchell.
- "Party Rock Farmhouse" - A cooking show featuring LMFAO's Redfoo and his partner Jazzy.
- "Pig Little Lies" - A unique reality series centered around pot bellied pigs.

== Performances ==
McCrystal has performed with Randy Travis and Kristin Chenoweth, Rachel Tucker, Brian Kennedy, Rita Wilson and Chloe Agnew, he makes regular guest appearances on the Grand Ole Opry in Nashville, Tennessee, and is often backed by a 12-piece orchestra.

In December 2016, McCrystal toured the United States (15 cities in 18 days) with Chloe Agnew, notable venues included: The Grammy Museum at LA Live and The Kennedy Center, Washington DC.

Eamonn performs regularly on PBS Television with his concerts "The Music of Northern Ireland" (PBS) and "The Music of Christmas" (BBC/PBS) and on the BBC in the UK, most notably BBC Children In Need, Songs of Praise and live music performances on BBC Radio.

== Discography ==
=== Albums ===
- After the Storm (2000)
- The Search (2006)
- Rest for Your Soul (2007)
- Eamonn McCrystal Live (2009)
- When in Nashville... (2011)
- The Music of Christmas & the Stories Behind the Songs (2013)
- A Living Prayer (2014)
- The Music of Northern Ireland (CD & DVD, 2015)
- Where Does The Time Go? (2015)
- And So It Goes (2016)

=== Singles ===
- "If It's Gonna Rain" (2010)
- "Under Your Wings" (2012)
- "Blue Christmas" (2013)
- "Auld Lang Syne" (2013)
- "Pray For Peace" (2016) feat. Rita Wilson and Chloë Agnew
- "You Haven't Seen The Last of Me" (2018)
- "Love Will Wait" (2020)

=== Collaborations ===
- "Someone You Never Knew" – with Randy Travis (from Anniversary Celebration, 2011)
- "Pray For Peace" (2016) feat. Rita Wilson and Chloë Agnew (from And So It Goes 2016)
- "We've Got Tonight" – with Chloë Agnew (from And So It Goes 2016)
