= The Death of God (song) =

Single by Roy Harper
- B-side: "The Death of God (Short Version)"
- Released: April 20, 2005
- Recorded: 2005
- Genre: Folk, Rock
- Length: Track 1. 13:18 Track 2. 2:58
- Label: Science Friction HUCD038
- Songwriter: Roy Harper
- Producer: Roy Harper

Roy Harper singles chronology
"'The Methane zone'" (1992)	"The Death of God" (2005)

"The Death of God" is the second and most recent CD single by Roy Harper, released in April 2005.

== History ==
Of the 2003 Iraq War, Harper stated "Our famous leader took us into an illegal war and killed thousands of children. Was that cool? Or was it all just a myth?..."

The 13 minute single was "...conceived out of (the) disgust I feel whenever war is used as some kind of solution..." (see cover notes). the lyrics contain various stories rolled into one, those of "The emigrant, the soldier, the bomber, the leader, and "God!".

Harper dedicated the single to the memory of Ali Hader VC, of the 6th/13th Frontier Force Rifles, Indian Army (Pakistan). "...who helped to get me out of a bit of a jam with Adolf in '45...".

A video of the song was released in 2005 on Harper's DVD album, Beyond the Door.

== Track listing ==
1. "The Death of God" (Long Version) – 13:18
2. "The Death of God" (Short Version) – 2:58

== Personnel ==
- Roy Harper – vocals and guitar
- Matt Churchill – guitar
- John Fitzgerald – keyboard
- Laurie
- Duncan
- George Fort – cover design
- Brad and Monica – cover design
