= Shane Harper =

American actor and singer-songwriter

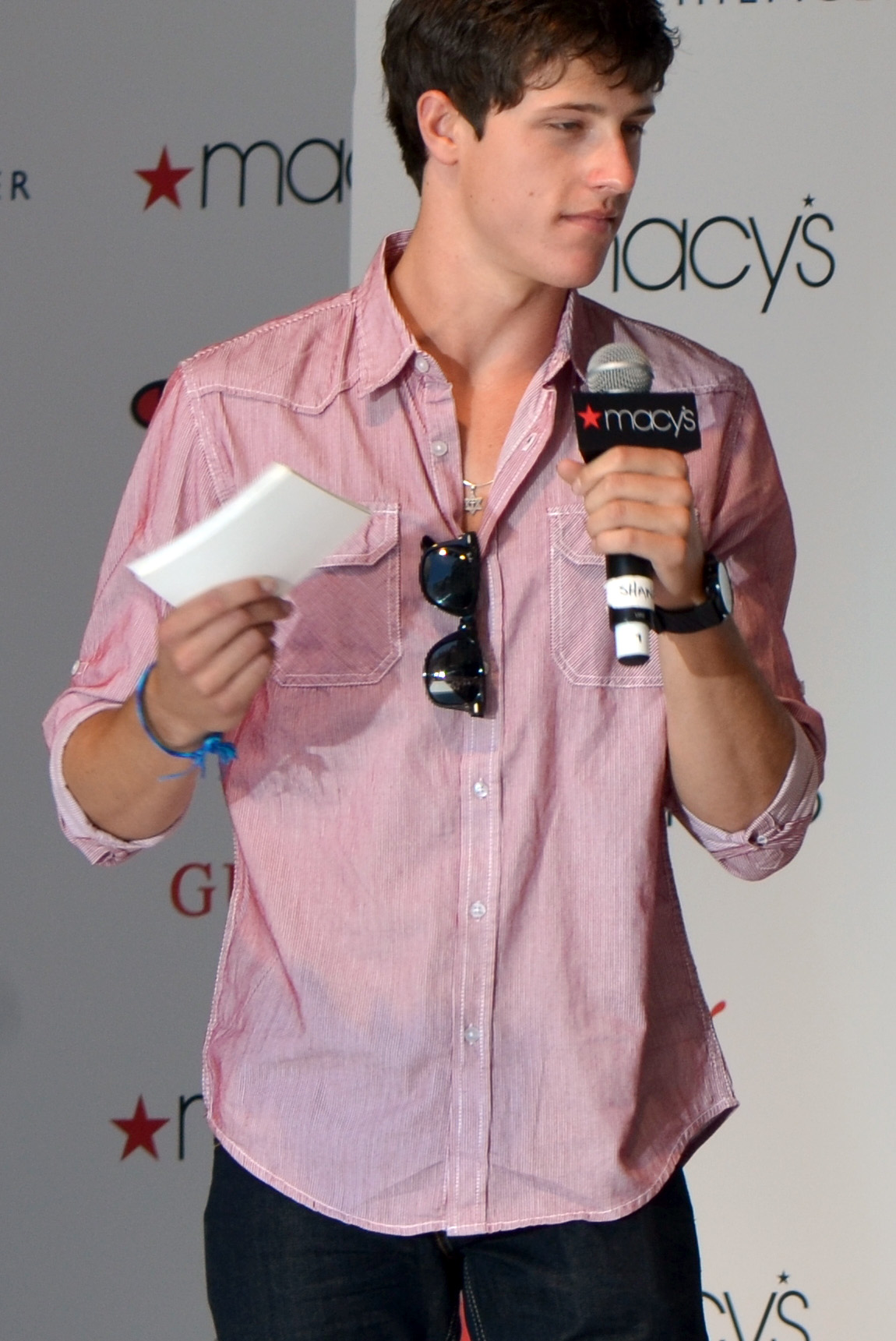
- Harper in 2011
- Born: Shane Steven Harper; February 14, 1993 (age 33); San Diego, California, U.S.
- Occupations: Actor; singer
- Years active: 2006–present
- Spouse: Samantha Boscarino (m. 2025)
- Musical career
- Genres: Pop; pop rock; Christian rock
- Instruments: Vocals; guitar
- Labels: Deep Well; Virgin
- Website: shaneharper.com

Shane Steven Harper (born February 14, 1993) is an American actor and singer. He is known for playing Spencer on Good Luck Charlie, Josh Wheaton in God's Not Dead, Wyatt in NCIS: New York, and Victor Flynn on Power Book IV: Force.

== Early life ==
Harper was born in La Jolla neighborhood of San Diego, California, the son of Tanya (née Michaelson) and Scott Harper. He is of Austrian, German, Jewish, and Scottish descent. He has an older sister named Samantha, also a professional dancer, and a younger brother named Sullivan, a model. Harper began dancing and acting at the age of nine, and was involved in community theater and competitive dance. He also started singing and playing guitar and piano at the same age. He is trained in ballet, hip-hop, lyrical, jazz, and tap. He also studied martial arts between the ages of four and 12, and obtained a black belt in Karate. In the spring of 2006, a talent agent on the judging panel of a regional dance competition offered Harper an agency representation.

== Career ==
=== Acting career ===
Harper had minor roles as a principal dancer in various shows and movies such as High School Musical 2, Re-Animated, and Dance Revolution before becoming one of the lead dancers and the youngest (the Nick 6) on Nickelodeon's Dance on Sunset. He landed on dance roles in 2006, including lead dancer for the music video Step Up with Samantha Jade, and Cartoon Network's Re-Animated and the Saturday morning kid's competition, Dance Revolution. In 2010, Harper got his first two movie roles in the films My Name is Khan and Flipped, as a minor character in each.

Harper also began his recurring role as Spencer Walsh on Disney Channel's Good Luck Charlie, playing alongside Bridgit Mendler, and guest-starred on an episode of Wizards of Waverly Place. He also guest-starred as the musical guest on So Random!, singing his single, "One Step Closer". He's also starred in 7 episodes in MTV's TV series Awkward as Austin Welch.

In March 2014, he starred in the Christian-based film, God's Not Dead, where he plays the main character, college student Josh Wheaton, who has to prove to his atheist professor that God is not dead. For this movie, Harper finished writing his song called "Hold You Up", a song that encourages Christians to stand for their faith. The song peaked at number 1 on Billboards Hot AC/CHR charts, and has so far peaked at number 21 on the Billboard Hot Christian Charts.

He starred as Brandon in the musical film Dance-Off co-starring Kathryn McCormick. The movie is about two cross-town rival dance teams go head to head for the National Nationals Championship. Next, Harper starred as Ian Chandler in short lived MTV series Happyland co-starring alongside Bianca A. Santos and Katherine McNamara. In 2015, he starred as Stephen in the family film Lift Me Up.

He played the role of one of the disciples in the musical TV special The Passion, which was released March 20, 2016, on Fox. In 2017, Harper played the role of Robbie, a charming waiter at the resort who woos and then cheats on Baby's older sister, Lisa, in the TV movie Dirty Dancing for ABC. He played the role of Sam Grover in the indie film Flock of Four. He also guest starred in the CBS dramas Code Black and Wisdom of the Crowd.

In 2018, Harper starred as Josh Wheaton in the third film in the franchise God's Not Dead: A Light in Darkness. He also starred as Tom Paxton in the PixL original movie The Time Capsule alongside Penelope Mitchell.

In 2020, Harper starred as Junior in the Starz series Hightown, and the Hulu miniseries, A Teacher as Logan Davis.

=== Music career ===
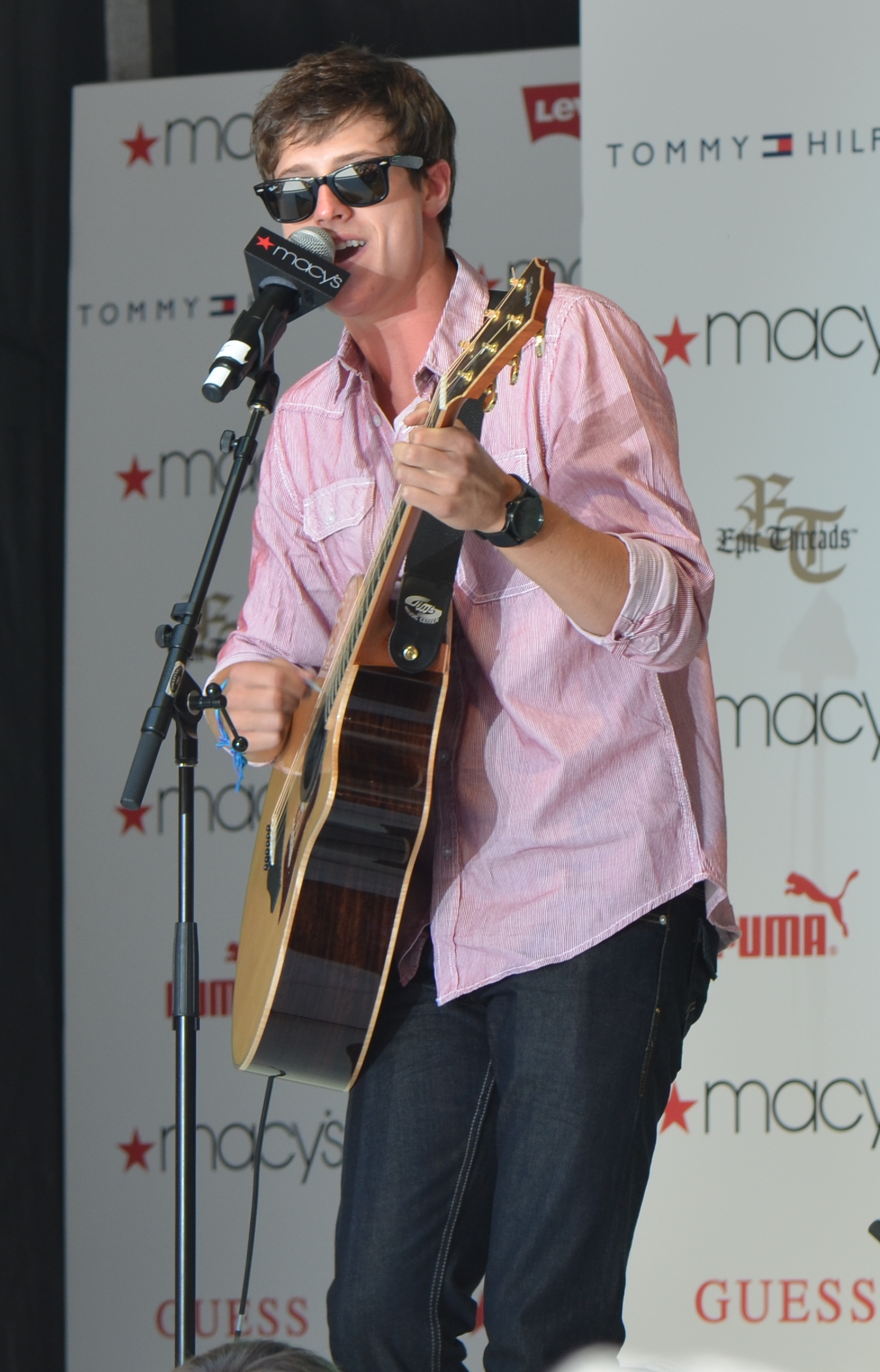
Harper performing in July 2011

Harper's first single, "Dance with Me", was released on March 30, 2010. The music video was released a couple of weeks prior and features Harper dancing and playing guitar. In 2011, Harper signed to AMi Records. In 2011, he released "One Step Closer", the second single from his debut album. The self-titled album was released on April 12, 2011. The third and final single released off of the album was "Rocketship". Also in 2011, Harper opened for Greyson Chance and Cody Simpson on their Waiting 4U Tour in addition to opening for Miranda Cosgrove on her Dancing Crazy Tour. The deluxe version of his debut album "Shane Harper" was released on February 14, 2012, at Target stores nationwide and features four bonus tracks. In 2012, Harper released Dancin in the Rain EP.

In 2016, Harper announced that he has signed a record deal with Capitol. April 29, 2016, Harper announced on his Twitter that he would support Jacob Whitesides on his The Lovesick Tour, which begun in May and ended in October. On May 27, 2016, Harper released an EP titled "Like I Did." On August 11, 2016, he released a music video for "Like I Did".

== Personal life ==
Harper is a devout Christian.

He began dating former Good Luck Charlie co-star Bridgit Mendler in May 2011. In November 2015, their breakup was confirmed after months of speculation.

In 2017, Harper began a relationship with Samantha Boscarino, who also worked with him on Good Luck Charlie. They married in 2025.

== Filmography ==
=== Film ===
Year	Title	Role	Notes
2006	Re-Animated	Supporting dancer	
2007	High School Musical 2	Supporting dancer	
2010	My Name Is Khan	Tim Tompson	
2010	Flipped	Matt Baker	
2011	Game Time: Tackling the Past	Sean Tate	
2014	God's Not Dead	Josh Wheaton	
2014	Dance-off	Brandon	
2015	Lift Me Up	Stephen	
2016	An Apprentice	as director	Short film
2017	Flock of Four	Sam Grover	
2018	God's Not Dead: A Light in Darkness	Josh Wheaton	
2026	Take Me Home	James	

=== Television ===
Year	Title	Role	Notes
2006	Dance Revolution	Contestant	Episode: "4"
2007	Zoey 101	Tenth Grader	Episode: "Drippin' Episode"
2008	Dance on Sunset	Contestant	
2010–14	Good Luck Charlie	Spencer Walsh	Recurring role
2011	Wizards of Waverly Place	Fidel	Episode: "Three Maxes and a Little Lady"
2013–14	Awkward	Austin	Recurring role (Seasons 3–4)
2014	Happyland	Ian Chandler	Main role
2016	The Passion: New Orleans	Disciple	Television film
2017	Wisdom of the Crowd	Jason Forde	Episode: "Trojan Horse"
2017	Dirty Dancing	Robbie Gould	Television film
2018	The Time Capsule	Tom Paxton	Television film
2018	Code Black	Clark Behar	Episode: "The Business of Saving Lives"
2020	Just Add Magic: Mystery City	Ian Maddox	Recurring role
2020	Hightown	Junior	Main role (season 1)
2020	A Teacher	Logan Davis	Main role
2022–26	Power Book IV: Force	Victor Flynn	Main role
2026–present	NCIS: New York	Wyatt Hill	Main role

== Discography ==
=== Studio albums ===
List of studio albums, with selected details, chart positions and certifications
Title	Album details	Peak chart positions
Title	Album details	US Heat.
Shane Harper	Released: April 12, 2011; Formats: CD, digital download; Label: Deep Well	17
"—" denotes releases that did not chart or were not released in that territory.

=== Extended plays ===
List of extended plays, with selected details and chart positions
Title	Album details	Peak chart positions
Title	Album details	US Heat.
Dancin in the Rain	Released: August 14, 2012; Formats: Digital download; Label: Deep Well	49
Like I Did	Released: May 27, 2016; Formats: Digital download; Label: Virgin	—
Apt. 401	Released: September 4, 2020; Formats: Digital download; Label: Self-released	—
"—" denotes releases that did not chart or were not released in that territory.

=== Singles ===
List of singles, showing year released and album name
Title	Year	Album
"Dance with Me"	2010	Shane Harper
"One Step Closer"	2011	Shane Harper
"Wait for Me" (featuring Bridgit Mendler)	2011	Shane Harper
"Rocketship"	2012	Shane Harper
"Dancin' in the Rain"	2012	Dancin' in the Rain
"Flat World"	2012	Dancin' in the Rain
"Like I Did"	2016	Like I Did
"Say I Come Over	2020	Apt. 401
"Aly"	2020	Apt. 401

=== Promotional singles ===
List of promotional singles, showing year released and album name
Title	Year	Album
"We Need a Little Christmas"	2011	Non-album promotional singles
"O Holy Night"	2016	Non-album promotional singles

=== Other charted songs ===
List of other charted songs, with selected chart positions, showing year released and album name
Title	Year	Peak chart positions			Album
Title	Year	US Christ.	US Christ. A/C	US Holiday	Album
"My Song for You" (with Bridgit Mendler)	2012	—	—	3	Disney Channel Holiday Playlist
"Hold You Up"	2013	21	1	—	God's Not Dead
"—" denotes releases that did not chart or were not released in that territory.

=== Guest appearances ===
List of guest appearances, with other performing artists, showing year released and album name
Title	Year	Other artist(s)	Album
"What's Your Name"	2010	Rob Reiner & Michael Bolten	Flipped
"Love Can Move the Mountains"	2016	Michael W. Smith, Jencarlos, Prince Royce, Chris Daughtry	The Passion: New Orleans
"Turn the Lights Up"	2017	—N/a	Lift Me Up

=== Music videos ===
Title	Year	Director
"Dance with Me"	2011	Cam Hassman
"Rocketship"	2012	—N/a
"Dancing in the Rain"	2012	Billy Rainey
"Flat World"	2012	—N/a
"Like I Did"	2016	Steven Taylor
"Say I Come Over"	2020	Noah Kentis
"Aly"	2020	Noah Kentis

== Awards and nominations ==
Year	Award	Category	Film	Result
2014	K-Love Fan Award	Film / Television Impact Actor	God's Not Dead	Won

== Concert tours ==
Opening act

- Waiting 4U Tour (Cody Simpson and Greyson Chance) (2011)
- Summer Tour (Bridgit Mendler) (2013)
- The Lovesick Tour (Jacob Whitesides) (2016)
