= Marco Khan =

Iranian-American actor

- Մարկո Խան
- Born: Marco Khanlian; Tehran, Imperial State of Iran
- Occupations: Actor; stuntman

Marco Khanlian (Armenian: Մարկո Խանլեան, Persian: مارکو خانلیان), known professionally as Marco Khan (Armenian: Մարկո Խան), is an Iranian-American actor and stunt performer.

He has appeared in film and television series like Pirates of the Caribbean: Dead Man's Chest, Iron Man, and 10,000 BC, as well as many independent and short films.

== Biography ==
Khan was born in Tehran to Armenian parents; the son of Anna (née Karamian) and Levon Khanlian. His father was born in Lebanon but was raised in Iran, where he met Khan's mother, whose parents were from Georgia and she was born in Babol, Iran. Khan and his younger brother left Iran at age 11 in pursuit of higher education. He attended a Mekhitarist school, the Moorat-Raphael College in Venice, Italy, and then in Catalina, California. He now lives in Los Angeles.

== Filmography ==
=== Films ===
Year	Title	Role	Notes
1995	Waterworld	Smoker	Also stunt performer
1996	American Tigers	Navy SEAL	Also stunt performer
1997	True Vengeance	Mike	Also stunt performer
1998	Crossfire	Thug #2	
1998	The Howling Leopard	Hoss	
2001	15 Minutes	Immigrant	
2001	Women of the Night	Rand	Also stunt performer
2002	In the Wrong Hands	Rocky	Also stunt performer
2003	Date or Disaster	Dater	Short film
2004	September Tapes	Kidnapper	Also stunt performer
2005	Pit Fighter	Russian Fighter	Also stunt performer
2005	American Fusion	Jeremy	
2005	In the Blink of an Eye	The Bodyguard	Short film
2005	Looking for Comedy in the Muslim World	Pakistani Comedian	
2006	Hollywood Kills	The Assistant	
2006	Click	Habeeboo Entourage	
2006	Pirates of the Caribbean: Dead Man's Chest	Turkish Guard	
2006	The Champ	The Brute	Short film
2006	One Night With You	Alvin	
2007	Assassin	Assassin / Jon	Short film
2007	The Gene Generation	Bodyguard	
2008	Iron Man	Scarred Insurgent	
2008	Gimme Some Loving	The Bad Guy	Short film
2008	10,000 BC	One-Eye	
2008	You Don't Mess with the Zohan	Terrorist with Hand	
2009	The Grind	2nd Punisher	
2009	2012	Preacher	Uncredited
2011	Jerusalem Countdown	Javad	
2011	No Saints for Sinners	Tiny	
2011	Beneath the Wheel	Farheed	Short film
2012	The Son of an Afghan Farmer	Rafi	
2013	Betrayal	Ricardo	
2013	The Book of Esther	Bearded Guard	
2014	God's Not Dead	Misrab	
2014	Camp X-Ray	Mahmoud	
2014	Sinbad: The Fifth Voyage	Mujeed	
2014	Broken	Hamad	Short film
2015	AWOL-72	Apache	
2015	Straw Doll	Kevork Kachichian	Short film
2016	The Loner	Roham Rouhani	
2016	Mothers of the Desert	Bishop	Short film
2016	The Promise	Mehmet	
2016	Calico Skies	Khan	
2019	My Stretch of Texas Ground	Khalis	
2019	East of Byzantium: War Gods and Warrior Saints	Attila The Hun	Documentary film
2019	I Am That Man	Victor	
2019	Midwater	Old Man	Short film
2020	Run Sweetheart Run	Taxi Driver	
2021	God's Not Dead: We the People	Misrab	
2023	Brothers Till The End	Johnny Randazzo	Short film
2026	Zero A. D.: The Birth of Christ	Melchior	
2026	Misty Green	Prince Kashif	

=== Television ===
Year	Title	Role	Notes
1998	Columbo	Guard	Episode: "Ashes to Ashes"
2001	Passion Cove	Wrestler #2	Episode: "Silent Night"
2004	Charmed	Thief #1	Episode: "I Dream of Phoebe"
2003–04	JAG	Terrorist	2 episodes, also stunt performer
2005	Untold Stories of the E.R.	Reenactment Actor	Episode: "How Can This Happen?"
2005	E-Ring	Recruiter	Episode: "Escape and Evade"
2005	24	Gamil	3 episodes
2008	Las Vegas	Man #1	Episode: "3 Babes, 100 Guns and a Fat Chick"
2012	The Soul Man	Shaikh Khalil	Episode: "The God-Fathers"
2017	Curb Your Enthusiasm	Swarthy Guy	2 episodes
2018	SEAL Team	Bashir Kahn	Episode: "Never Get Out of the Boat"
2018	Counterpart	Raash	Recurring role; Season 2
2018	Splitting Up Together	Amir	Episode: "Street Meats"
2020	Black Monday	Jimmy	Episode: "Arthur Ponzarelli"
2020	I'm Sorry	Demitri	Unaired episode
2021	NCIS	Kidnapper	Episode: "True Believer", uncredited
2021	The Chosen	Husham	2 episodes
2022	Echo 3	Majid	2 episodes
2023	The Mandalorian	Warlord	Episode: "Chapter 23: The Spies"
2023	NCIS: Los Angeles	Ahmad Mahmad	Episode: "In the Name of Honor"
2023	This Fool	Farhad	2 episodes
2024	Based on a True Story	Armin	Episode: "This Week's Guest"

=== Video games ===
Year	Title	Role	Notes
2005	SWAT 4: The Stetchkov Syndicate	Male Bulgarian 1	Voice role
