= God's Not Dead: We the People =

2021 American film

- Theatrical release poster
- Directed by: Vance Null
- Screenplay by: Tommy Blaze
- Story by: Cary Solomon; Chuck Konzelman
- Produced by: Brent Ryan Green
- Starring: David A. R. White; Antonio Sabato Jr.; Francesca Battistelli; Jeanne Pirro; Isaiah Washington; William Forsythe
- Cinematography: Brian Shanley
- Edited by: Vance Null
- Music by: Pancho Burgos-Goizueta
- Production companies: Pinnacle Peak Pictures; Toy Gun Films
- Distributed by: Fathom Events
- Release date: October 4, 2021
- Running time: 91 minutes
- Country: United States
- Language: English
- Box office: $1.1 million

God's Not Dead: We the People is a 2021 American Christian drama film directed by Vance Null, with a script written by Tommy Blaze, from an original story co-authored by Cary Solomon and Chuck Konzelman. The sequel to God's Not Dead: A Light in Darkness and the fourth installment in the God's Not Dead series, the plot centers around Christian minister David Hill's role in defending religious homeschooling before Congress. The film stars David A. R. White, Antonio Sabato Jr., Francesca Battistelli, Judge Jeanne Pirro, Isaiah Washington, and William Forsythe.

The film was released on October 4, 2021, in a three-night theatrical engagement, and grossed over $1.1 million in the domestic box office.

A sequel titled, God's Not Dead: In God We Trust was released on September 12, 2024.

== Plot ==
A group of parents led by a local pastor, Dave Hill, are home-schooling their children when a representative from social services makes an unannounced visit and determines the parents' teaching is not sufficient in meeting federal education standards. The parents are summoned to court after their curriculum is deemed non-compliant with state educational standards. The families argue that they should have the right to educate their children in alignment with their religious beliefs. When the judge rules in favor of the state, the families, along with Reverend Dave, decide to appeal the decision.

They travel to Washington, D.C., where they seek to make their case in front of a congressional subcommittee. With assistance from fictional Congressman Daryl Smith, they argue that government oversight of their curriculum infringes upon parental rights and religious freedoms. The film culminates in a hearing where Reverend Dave and the families present their views on individual liberties and the role of the state in education. Following the conclusion of the hearing, a judge rules in favor of Dave Hill and the families' appeal.

== Cast ==
- David A. R. White as Reverend Dave Hill, a pastor who appeared in all three previous God's Not Dead films.
- Antonio Sabàto Jr. and Francesca Battistelli as Mike and Rebecca McKinnon, a couple who plan to homeschool their child
- Jeanine Pirro as Judge Elizabeth Neely, the local town judge who decides whether the McKinnons will continue to homeschool their children, send them to public school, or have them incarcerated if they refuse. Pirro previously made an uncredited cameo in the third film.
- Isaiah Washington as Rep. Daryl Smith, a Congressman who helps Dave.
- William Forsythe as Senator Robert Benson
- Matt Anspach as Brandon McKinnon, Mike and Rebecca's older son
- Benjamin Onyango as Reverend Jude Mbaye, a minister from Ghana and Dave Hill's friend who died in the previous film. He appears in a dream to encourage Dave to stand up for freedom.
- Dani Oliveros as Kayla Neely, Judge Neely's daughter who sells Brandon her car and becomes his girlfriend
- Marco Khan as Misrab, Ayisha's estranged father who rejected her from the first film, and tries to reunite her in an attempt to redeem himself all while deciding whether or not to accept Jesus Christ as savior
- Hadeel Sittu as Ayisha, Misrab's daughter who became Christian, and becomes involved in a car accident
- Paul Kwo as Martin Yip
- Paul Carroll as Congressional Aide

== Production ==
The film's production was announced on David A. R. White's Instagram in late 2020. It was filmed in Oklahoma during the COVID-19 pandemic.

== Reception ==
The film, like its predecessors, was largely panned by critics. Steve Pulaski of Influx Magazine gave the film a rare "F" letter-grade, criticizing the plot and message saying, "God's Not Dead: We the People is not merely the worst in an already-misbegotten series, but so utterly deplorable that its status as a three-night-only event in theaters at least assures that significantly fewer people will see it."

Conservative Christian film critic Christian Toto praised the film, stating that while it "shares the franchise's flaws...its bold mission statement has never been more necessary".

== See also ==
- Religious education
- School choice
- Christian persecution complex
