= Jericho, Nairobi =

Area of Nairobi, Kenya

Rabai Road, Jericho, Nairobi

Jericho is an estate in Nairobi, Kenya located in the east of Nairobi County. It is a constituent of Makadara Constituency. Jericho comprises Ofafa and Lumumba, and was established as a low-income, high-density housing development in the mid-1950s to house the African working class. Ofafa was named after Ambrose Ofafa, a prominent politician, while Lumumba was named after Patrice Lumumba, the first prime minister of the Democratic Republic of the Congo.

Jericho neighbours Makadara, Buru Buru, Harambee, Uhuru Estate, Maringo and Jerusalem Estate.

== Housing ==
After Kenya’s independence, Jericho was formed as a settlement specifically for the African working class. It was built with help from the Israeli government. Jericho houses are currently owned by the Nairobi City County, which is led by a Governor. All of the homes are the same shape and size. They are double storied houses with one tenant living on the ground floor and another on the top floor. Most of the area’s companies use the outside of these houses as advertising space and in return they paint the inside of the home for the resident(s). Most of these houses are occupied by young men who have inherited the homes from their parents who have either relocated to the rural areas or died. Due to lack of constant income, many home owners rent rooms within the houses for profit. The tenants pay an average of KSh.2,500–3,000/= for their occupancy.

== Society and culture ==
The Jericho area is occupied by almost all tribes in Kenya. The primary language of its inhabitants is called (Sheng) which is a mixture of English, Swahili and various vernacular languages. The average age of Jericho inhabitants is 35 years. The children of these residents attend city council schools which paid for by the government. With respect to healthcare, with the increase in healthcare education and services to this city, the prevalence of health concerns like HIV/AIDS and infant mortality has dropped significantly.

== Business and economy ==
The average pay for a Jeri resident is around KSh.20,000/= and they use approximately KSh.100/= daily for food in a day. Employment in Jericho centers around cottage industries, short contracts in the transport business, and FMCG vending. Some of the residents are mid-tire working class citizens but most also self-employed in small-medium enterprises. The youth of Jericho have also started various youth ventures such as garbage collection and car mechanical repairs.

== Notable people from Jericho ==
Jericho was home to the late Kisoi Munyao, the man who hoisted the Kenyan Flag on Mt. Kenya on 12 December 1963 during independence day. It was also home to Bildad Kaggia, Mzee Teacher (Karate legend) and Robert Wangila, Kenya's first and only Olympic boxing gold medalist.

It was the home of Barack Obama, Sr., a senior economist in the Kenyan Ministry of Finance, his first wife, and their children. Obama is the father of Barack Obama, the 44th president of the United States.

Jericho is home of many famous Kenyan football players, some of whom have gone on to play in the Kenyan league and abroad, as well as for the national team, Harambee Stars. The main football field in Jericho is Camp Toyoyo Grounds, also known as Camp Toyoyo Stadium. Jericho has produced many players that Most notable among these are John "Shoto" Lukoye, Benard "Zico" Otieno, Jacob "Ghost" Mulee, and George Olubendi.
