= Samantha Boscarino =

American actress

- Born: 1994/1995 (age 30–31)
- Occupation: Actress
- Years active: 2007–present
- Spouse: Shane Harper (m. 2025)

Samantha Harper (née Boscarino, born 1994/1995) is an American actress. She gained early attention for her role in the teen comedy film The Clique (2008), followed by her recurring role in the Disney Channel sitcom Good Luck Charlie (2010–2014), and her lead roles as Molly Garfunkel on the short-lived Nickelodeon series How to Rock (2012), and Ellie Davis in the 2016 television film The Cheerleader Murders.

== Career ==
Her first notable role was as Alicia Rivera in the film The Clique, produced by Tyra Banks, and costarring Bridgit Mendler. In 2009, she appeared in The Perfect Game as Gloria Jimenez and in Jonas as Amy. Boscarino also appeared in Parenthood as Lindsay and True Jackson, VP as Carla Gustav. Boscarino also had a nine-episode recurring role in Good Luck Charlie as Skyler, reuniting her with Mendler. In mid-2010, she appeared as Lisa Cucuy in Wizards of Waverly Place. In 2011, she made an appearance on Bucket & Skinner's Epic Adventures as C.J.

In 2012, Boscarino was cast as Molly Garfunkel on the Nickelodeon series How to Rock. The series premiered on February 4, 2012, and ended on December 8, 2012. She made several appearances on Figure It Out as a panelist. In 2016, Boscarino was the lead in the Lifetime television film, The Cheerleader Murders, playing the role of Ellie.

== Personal life ==
In 2017, Boscarino began a relationship with her former Good Luck Charlie co-star Shane Harper. They married in 2025.

== Filmography ==
=== Film ===
Year	Title	Role	Notes
2008	The Clique	Alicia Rivera	Direct-to-video
2009	The Perfect Game	Gloria Jimenez	
2018	God's Not Dead: A Light in Darkness	Keaton	
2019	The Kitty Kat Killer	Eileen	Short film
2020	We Die Alone	Chelsea	Short film
2022	Diamond in The Rough	Ariana Alvarez	
2026	Yellow Lights	Sarah Caufield	Short film

=== Television ===
Year	Title	Role	Notes
2009	Jonas	Amy	Episode: "Complete Repeat"
2010	Parenthood	Lindsay	Episode: "Perchance to Dream"
2010	True Jackson, VP	Carla Gustav	Episode: "Trapped in Paris"
2010–14	Good Luck Charlie	Skyler	Recurring role; 9 episodes
2010	Wizards of Waverly Place	Lisa Cucuy	Episode: "Alex Gives Up"
2011	Bucket & Skinner's Epic Adventures	C.J./Cindy Johnson	Episode: "Epic Dates"
2011	Jessie	Skyler	Episode: "NYC Christmas"
2012	How to Rock	Molly Garfunkel	Main role
2012	Figure It Out	Herself	6 episodes
2014	Zoe Gone	Amber	Television film
2014	NCIS	Mary LaFleur	Episode: "Semper Fortis"
2015	House of Lies	Avery	Episode: "Trust Me, I'm Getting Plenty of Erections"
2015	Girl Meets World	Sophie Miller	Episode: "Girl Meets First Date"
2015	Hot in Cleveland	The Bouncer	2 episodes; uncredited
2016	The Cheerleader Murders	Ellie Davis	Television film
2017	Animal Kingdom	Bride	Episode: "Treasure"
2019	The Resident	Bella	Episode: "Belief System"
2019	Shameless	Sabrina	Episode: "Sleep Well My Prince for Tomorrow You Shall Be King"
2019	Slay	Claire	Miniseries
2022	For All Mankind	Jenna	Episode: "All In" - Season 3
2022	Law & Order: Special Victims Unit	Martina Rodriguez	Episode: "Breakwater"
2024	Ghosts	Marisa	Episode: "A Star Is Dead"
2025–26	Power Book IV: Force	Rae Thompson	8 episodes
2026	The Rookie	Deputy Colleen White	Episode: "The Network"

=== Music videos ===
Year	Title	Artist	Role	Notes	Ref.
2012	"Only You Can Be You"	Cymphonique Miller	Molly Garfunkel	How to Rock soundtrack	
2012	"Rocketship"	Shane Harper			
2016	"Atlantis"	Bridgit Mendler			

== Discography ==
=== As lead artist ===
Year	Title	Soundtrack
2008	"A Little Bit"	Mr. Troop Mom
2008	"Find My Place"	The Clique
2012	"Rules For Being Popular"	How To Rock
