= Beyond the Door (DVD) =

Live album by Roy Harper
- Released: 2005
- Recorded: De Barra's Folk Club July 2004
- Genre: Folk, indie folk, progressive folk
- Length: CD: 63:31; DVD:
- Label: Science Friction; HUDV040

Roy Harper chronology
Royal Festival Hall Live – June 10th 2001 (2001)	Beyond the Door (2005)	Classic Rock Legends: Roy Harper - Live In Concert At Metropolis Studios (2011)

Beyond the Door is Harper's first ever DVD release. The DVD combines studio footage recorded at Harper's home in February, August and September 2005, with images, illustrations, animations, "The Death of God" song video, and live performance footage recorded on 22 and 29 July 2004 at the Irish folk club "De Barra's" in Clonakilty, Cork of Harper accompanied by Matt Churchill.

The package also included an additional 10-track audio CD of the De Barra's performances, an 8-page booklet, and (on the DVD) an interview with Harper.

The release received a 4-star review from Mojo, UNCUT and from Classic Rock magazine, who made it their "DVD of the month".

== Track listing ==
=== DVD ===
1. Tom Tiddler's Ground—6:55
2. Pinches Of Salt—5:00
3. How Does It Feel—6:34
4. Punch And Judy—6:29
5. The Green Man—6:24
6. One Man Rock And Roll Band—9:52
7. Frozen Moment—4:01
8. The Death of God—13:27
9. Kangaroo Blues—4:58
10. Miles Remains—10:40
11. Hallucinating Light—8:11
12. 12 Hours Of Sunset—7:45

=== CD ===
1. Tom Tiddler's Ground—6:35
2. How Does It Feel—6:12
3. Frozen Moment—3:32
4. The Green Man—5:42
5. Pinches Of Salt—4:44
6. One Man Rock And Roll Band—9:12
7. Punch And Judy—6:26
8. Hallucinating Light—6:21
9. Miles Remains—9:14
10. 12 Hours Of Sunset—5:33

== Personnel ==
- Duncan Lutz—Bass (DVD track 8)
- Roy Harper—Guitar, Vocals, Production
- John Fitzgerald—Keyboards (DVD track 8), Sound recording
- Matt Churchill—Lead Guitar
- Laurie Hedger—Percussion (DVD track 8)
- Jon Mitton—Editor, Art Direction (Video) and Authoring
- Ian Armstrong—Film Director (3)
- John O'Donahue—Sound recording
