= God's Not Dead: A Light in Darkness =

- Theatrical release poster
- Directed by: Michael Mason
- Written by: Michael Mason
- Produced by: David A. R. White; Michael Scott; Brittany Yost; Elizabeth Travis; Alysoun Wolfe
- Starring: David A. R. White; John Corbett; Shane Harper; Ted McGinley; Tatum O'Neal
- Cinematography: Brian Shanley
- Edited by: Joseph Sandoval
- Music by: Pancho Burgos-Goizueta
- Production companies: Pure Flix; GND Media Group
- Distributed by: Pure Flix Entertainment
- Release date: March 30, 2018
- Running time: 106 minutes
- Country: United States
- Language: English
- Box office: $7.6 million

God's Not Dead: A Light in Darkness is a 2018 American Christian drama film written and directed by Michael Mason. It is a sequel to 2016's God's Not Dead 2, and the third installment overall in the God's Not Dead film series. It stars David A. R. White, John Corbett, Shane Harper, Benjamin Onyango, Ted McGinley, Jennifer Taylor, Tatum O'Neal, Shwayze and Cissy Houston.

The film follows the others' Christian persecution complex theme, and is loosely based on the story of five pastors in Texas who were issued subpoenas for sermons, due to potential violation of the Johnson Amendment. Unlike in the film, in reality the subpoenas were soon dropped; since 2008 only one of more than 2,000 mainly evangelical Christian clergy deliberately violating the law has been audited, and none punished.

Principal photography was completed in Little Rock, Arkansas, in December 2017. It was released in the United States on March 30, 2018, and received generally unfavorable reviews from critics. The film made less in its entire theatrical run ($7.4 million) than each of the previous two grossed in their respective domestic opening weekends ($9.7 million and $7.6 million). It brought the cumulative gross of the film series to $96.6 million worldwide.

A sequel titled, God's Not Dead: We the People, was released in October 2021.

== Plot ==
After Rev. David Hill is released from prison (as seen in God's Not Dead 2), controversy is sparked against Dave's St. James Church, which is on college campus grounds. Things get worse when college student Adam Richertson, reeling from his breakup from his skeptical girlfriend Keaton, tosses a brick into the church, igniting a fire that kills Rev Jude and nearly destroys the church. This causes the college to start the process of shutting down the church to replace it with a student center, much to the dismay of Dave, who begin the process of suing the college to save St. James.

During the lawsuit against the school, Dave enlists the help of his estranged atheist brother, attorney Pearce Hill, who tries to explain to Dave that it is not a case worth fighting for. Dave refuses to listen to his brother's advice and continues the case into court. After failing to reach a settlement with the college, the trial date is set for the lawsuit. At the same time, Adam sends an anonymous text to Dave, confessing to the church fire, causing a furious Dave to assault him. This severely wounds his lawsuit's case and public opinion towards it, and leads to Adam being arrested and charged as a felony case. A frustrated Pearce leaves, feeling that Dave has gone too far, and that he does not think about what other people are going through, explaining how hurt he was after his family pushed him out for doubting his faith.

After seeking God's help in church through prayer, Dave eventually realizes that his case has only made things worse and that St. James is not the right church for God and his followers. He drops his lawsuit, reaches an out-of-court settlement with the college, and after talking with a repentant Adam and consulting with Jude's family, ultimately asks to have the criminal charges against Adam dropped. Dave then announces to his college protesters that while St. James will be torn down, he will reopen a new church not far from the school.

In a post credits scene, Newsboys member Michael Tait encourages the audience to text #Godsnotdead and share the gospel to everyone to keep the movement going.

== Cast ==
- David A. R. White as Rev. Dave Hill, the Pastor of St. James Church
- John Corbett as Pearce Hill, Dave Hill's estranged brother who is an atheist
- Shane Harper as Josh Wheaton, a former college student who stood up to Professor Radisson in the first film, now a campus minister
- Ted McGinley as Thomas Ellsworth, chancellor and a lead board member of Hadleigh University
- Jennifer Taylor as Meg Harvey, owner of a local soup kitchen who helps Dave persevere
- Benjamin Onyango as Rev. Jude Mbaye, a Ghanaian minister and Reverend Dave's friend
- Mike Manning as Adam Richertson, Keaton Young's boyfriend
- Samantha Boscarino as Keaton Young, a student at Hadleigh University
- Tatum O'Neal as Barbara Solomon, a board member of Hadleigh University.
- Cissy Houston as lead choir vocalist
- Shwayze as Teo, a friend of Keaton Young at Hadleigh University
- Gregory Alan Williams as Rev. Roland Dial, a black baptist pastor
- Jennifer Cipolla as Sydney, one of Keaton Young's friends
- Newsboys as themselves
- Jeanine Pirro as herself (credited as Judge Jeanine Pirro)

== Production ==
Principal photography took place in December 2017 around Little Rock, Arkansas. Its exact filming locations were on the University of Central Arkansas and Hendrix College campuses. Both colleges are located in Conway, Arkansas.

== Reception ==
=== Box office ===
In the United States and Canada, God's Not Dead: A Light in Darkness was released on March 30, 2018, alongside Acrimony and Ready Player One, and was projected to gross $4–6 million from 1,685 theaters in its opening weekend. It ended up debuting to just $2.6 million, finishing 12th at the box office and marking the lowest opening of the series. According to analysis of social media by Relish Mix the film suffered from being the third film of a trilogy and religious audiences saw the film as "a cash grab and not a movie promoting a Christian message anymore", and were more inclined to go to other faith-based films in theaters like I Can Only Imagine and Paul, Apostle of Christ. It fell 58% in its second weekend to $1.1 million, finishing 17th. By the end of its North American run the film grossed a total of $5.5 million, less than other two films grossed simply in their opening weekends ($9.7 million and $7.6 million, respectively).

=== Critical response ===
On review aggregation website Rotten Tomatoes, the film has an approval rating of 11% based on 18 reviews, and an average rating of 3.6/10. On Metacritic, the film has a weighted average score of 33 out of 100, based on reviews from 9 critics, indicating "generally unfavorable" reviews. Audiences polled by CinemaScore gave the film an average grade of "A−" on an A+ to F scale, though as with the second film, Deadline Hollywood noted that "faith-based films have an easy time gaining an A on CinemaScore".

Josh Terry of the Deseret News gave the film a mixed review, and wrote that it "means well, but it needs to drop the editorializing, streamline its story and let its message stand on its own."

Owen Gleiberman of Variety gave it a mixed review and wrote: "It's my observation that critics tend to bash faith-based films a little too reflexively, and this one, taken on its own terms, isn't bad in a TV-movie-fodder-as-parable way." Gleiberman wrote positively about the brotherly relationship at the core of the story, praising Corbett for his performance.

Writing for Vox, Alissa Wilkinson classifies the entire film series as being about Christian persecution complex theme, with particular criticism of how A Light in the Darkness distorts the truth surrounding the real court cases it name-checks.

The A.V. Club included the film on its list of the worst of the year.

== Sequel ==
A sequel, God's Not Dead: We the People, was released in October 2021.
