= Christian persecution complex =

Belief that Christianity is oppressed in the Western world

In the Western world, the Christian persecution complex is the belief, attitude, or worldview that Christians and Christian values are being oppressed by Western governments and social groups. This belief is promoted by certain American Protestant churches, and some Christian- or Bible-based groups in Europe. It has been called the "Evangelical", "American Christian" or "Christian right" persecution complex.

== Early Christianity ==
According to New Testament scholar Candida Moss, the Christian "persecution complex" appeared during the era of early Christianity due to internal Christian identity politics. Moss suggested that the idea of persecution is cardinal to the worldview of Christianity, noting that it creates the impression that Christians, even when numerically superior, are a minority facing a war. This perception is grounded in the belief that the world is divided into two factions, one led by God and the other by Satan. In this view, there is no compromise between the two, and attempts at dialogue and engagement with "the other" are already seen as a form of collaboration with it. Medieval historian Paul Cavill has argued that the New Testament portrays persecution as inherent to Christianity.

== 20th century ==
According to Elizabeth Castelli, some set the starting point of the Christian persecution complex in the middle of the 20th century, following a series of court rulings that declared public places to be out of bounds for religious activity, e.g. state-sanctioned morning prayer in schools. The persecution complex became readily apparent in the United States in the 1990s with the adoption of the International Religious Freedom Act of 1998 as the official foreign policy. The complex "mobilizes the language of religious persecution to shut down political debate and critique by characterizing any position not in alignment with this politicized version of Christianity as an example of anti-religious bigotry and persecution. Moreover, it routinely deploys the archetypal figure of the martyr as a source of unquestioned religious and political authority".

== 21st century ==
The September 11 attacks boosted its development. The concept of an oppressed Christianity has been popular among contemporary conservative politicians in the United States, who use this idea to address issues concerning LGBT people or the Affordable Care Act's contraceptive mandate, which supposedly attack Christianity. The application of the contraceptive mandate to closely held corporations with religious objections was struck down by the Supreme Court in Burwell v. Hobby Lobby Stores, Inc.

Hornback noted that the Christian persecution complex is widespread among nationalists in Europe, who believe that they are defending the continent from a new Islamic invasion. In 2013 and 2019, journalists pointed out that "American Christians have a persecution complex", while noting that actual persecution of Christians existed in the Middle East.

As of 2017, Christian persecution complex has had an impact on popular culture, with films which "imagine embattled Christians prevailing against entrenched secularist opposition". In 2018, David Ehrlich, a film critic, described how the persecution complex is fueled by films and media such as the God's Not Dead saga.

As of 2019, some nationalistic dispensationalists have promoted a narrative of Western persecution of Christians, in order to claim a position of marginalization and disadvantage.

== See also ==
- Christian privilege
- Decline of Christianity in the Western world
- History of Christian thought on persecution and tolerance
- Persecution of Christians
- Persecutory delusions
- Rosenberger v. University of Virginia
- Town of Greece v. Galloway
- Tucker Carlson Tonight and The Tucker Carlson Show
- Victim mentality
- Victim playing
- White genocide conspiracy theory
