= The Best of & the Rest of The Korgis =

The Best of & The Rest of The Korgis

Greatest hits album by The Korgis
- Released: 1990
- Recorded: 1977–1981
- Genre: Pop
- Length: 41:43
- Label: Action Replay (UK)
- Producer: The Korgis; James Warren; David Lord

The Korgis chronology
Burning Questions (1987)	The Best of & The Rest of The Korgis (1990)	This World's for Everyone (1992)

The Best of The Korgis is a compilation album by English pop band The Korgis. It was released by Action Replay in 1990. This is a CD re-issue of the 1983 UK album The Best of The Korgis.

== Track listing ==
1. "Everybody's Got to Learn Sometime" (Warren) - 4:13
  - From 1980 album Dumb Waiters
2. "If I Had You" (Davis, Rachmaninoff) - 3:54
  - From 1979 album The Korgis
3. "All the Love in the World" (Davis, Warren) - 3:38
  - Single edit. Original version on 1981 album Sticky George
4. "I Just Can't Help It" (Davis) - 3:44
  - Single remix. Original version on 1979 album The Korgis
5. "If It's Alright with You Baby" (Warren) - 4:01
  - From 1980 album Dumb Waiters
6. "That Was My Big Mistake" (Davis, Warren) - 4:01
  - Single edit. Original version on 1981 album Sticky George
7. "Domestic Bliss" (Gordon, Harrison, Warren) - 3:15
  - From 1981 album Sticky George
8. "O Maxine" (Warren) - 2:39
  - From 1979 album The Korgis
9. "Don't Say That It's Over" (Warren) - 2:46
  - From 1981 album Sticky George
10. "Drawn and Quartered" (Warren) - 3:17
  - From 1980 album Dumb Waiters
11. "It's No Good Unless You Love Me" (Warren) - 3:22
  - From 1980 album Dumb Waiters
12. "Rover's Return" (Davis) - 3:31
  - From 1980 album Dumb Waiters

== Release history ==
- 1990 Action Replay CDAR 1015
