= Unplugged (The Korgis album) =

Live album by the Korgis
- Released: 2006
- Recorded: 2005
- Genre: Pop
- Label: Angel Air
- Producer: The Korgis

The Korgis chronology
Kollection (2005)	Unplugged (2006)	Folk & Pop Classics (2007)

Professional ratings
Review scores
Source	Rating
AllMusic	4.5/5 stars

Unplugged is a live album by English pop band, the Korgis. It was released in 2006.

The unplugged concert was originally only recorded for inclusion on the Kollection DVD in the summer of 2005, but was released as a proper album the following year. The album contains acoustic versions of all of the band's best known songs such as "Everybody's Got to Learn Sometime", "Young 'n' Russian", "If It's Alright with You Baby" and "If I Had You" as well as tracks from their albums The Korgis, Dumb Waiters, Sticky George, Burning Questions and This World's For Everyone

== Track listing ==
1. "Cold Tea" (Warren) – 4:31
2. "Dumb Waiters" (Warren) – 2:40
3. "If I Had You" (Davis, Rachmaninoff) – 3:31
4. "I Wonder What's Become of You" (Baker, Warren) – 3:35
5. "That's What Friends Are For" (Davis, Ferguson) – 3:28
6. "If It's Alright with You Baby" (Warren) – 3:29
7. "Perfect Hostess" (Davis) – 3:17
8. "Young 'n' Russian" (Davis, Ridlington, Warren) – 3:24
9. "All the Love in the World" (Davis, Warren) – 3:44
10. "Everybody's Got to Learn Sometime" (Warren) – 3:17
11. "This World's for Everyone" (Warren) – 3:34
12. "Lines" (Lindsey) – 3:17
13. "It Won't Be the Same Old Place" (Davis, Warren) – 4:27
14. "It All Comes Down to You" (Baker, Davis) – 3:48

== Personnel ==
- Andy Davis – keyboards, guitars, backing vocals,
- James Warren – guitars, lead vocals, backing vocals
- John Baker – guitars, keyboards, lead vocals, backing vocals

== Production ==
- The Korgis – producers

== Release history ==
- 2006 Angel Air SJPCD 213
