= Klassics – The Best of The Korgis =

Greatest hits album by The Korgis
- Released: 2001
- Recorded: 1977–1981
- Genre: Pop music
- Length: 60:15
- Label: Music Club International (UK)
- Producer: The Korgis; James Warren; David Lord

The Korgis chronology
Greatest Hits (2001)	Klassics – The Best of The Korgis (2001)	Don't Look Back – The Very Best of The Korgis (2003)

Klassics – The Best of The Korgis is a compilation album by English pop band The Korgis. It was released by Music Club International UK in 2001. The compilation includes the alternate versions of "Everybody's Gotta Learn Sometime" and "Nowhere To Run" that first appeared on Edsel Records' 1999 CD re-issues of albums Dumb Waiters and Sticky George.

== Track listing ==
1. "If I Had You" (Davis, Rachmaninoff) – 3:54
  - From 1979 album The Korgis
2. "Everybody's Got to Learn Sometime" (Warren) - 4:13
  - Alternate version from 1999 CD reissue of 1980 album Dumb Waiters
3. "If It's Alright with You Baby" (Warren) - 4:01
  - From 1980 album Dumb Waiters
4. "That Was My Big Mistake" (Davis, Warren) - 4:35
  - From 1981 album Sticky George
5. "Can't We Be Friends Now" (Warren) - 4:01
  - From 1981 album Sticky George
6. "Young 'n' Russian" (Davis, Ridlington, Warren) - 3:12
  - From 1979 album The Korgis
7. "I Just Can't Help It" (Davis) - 3:40
  - From 1979 album The Korgis
8. "Art School Annexe" (Davis) - 3:37
  - From 1979 album The Korgis
9. "Boots and Shoes" (Davis, Warren) - 4:32
  - From 1979 album The Korgis
10. "O Maxine" (Warren) - 2:39
  - From 1979 album The Korgis
11. "Silent Running" (Warren) - 3:05
  - From 1980 album Dumb Waiters
12. "Love Ain't Too Far Away" (Davis) - 3:29
  - From 1980 album Dumb Waiters
13. "Perfect Hostess" (Davis) - 3:21
  - From 1980 album Dumb Waiters
14. "Drawn and Quartered" (Warren) - 3:17
  - From 1980 album Dumb Waiters
15. "It's No Good Unless You Love Me" (Warren) - 3:22
  - From 1980 album Dumb Waiters
16. "Domestic Bliss" (Gordon, Harrison, Warren) - 3:15
  - From 1981 album Sticky George
17. "Nowhere to Run" (Davis, Warren) - 5:17
  - Alternate version from 1999 CD reissue of 1981 album Sticky George
18. "Contraband" (Warren) - 3:18
  - From 1981 album Sticky George
19. "All the Love in the World" (Davis, Warren) - 3:38
  - Single edit. Original version on 1981 album Sticky George
20. "Living on the Rocks" (Warren) - 3:32
  - From 1981 album Sticky George

== Release history ==
- 2001 Music Club International MCCD 474
