= Archive Series (The Korgis album) =

Compilation album by The Korgis
- Released: 1997
- Recorded: 1977–1981
- Genre: Pop
- Length: 69:54
- Label: Rialto Records (UK)
- Producer: The Korgis; James Warren; David Lord

The Korgis chronology
This World's for Everyone (1992)	Archive Series (1997)	Greatest Hits (2001)

Professional ratings
Review scores
Source	Rating
Allmusic	4/5 stars

Archive Series a.k.a. The Korgis Archive is a compilation album by English pop band The Korgis. It was released by Rialto Records in 1997.
This is a CD re-issue of the 1983 UK album The Best of The Korgis with eight additional tracks.

== Track listing ==
1. "Everybody's Got to Learn Sometime" (Warren) - 4:13
  - From 1980 album Dumb Waiters
2. "If I Had You" (Davis, Rachmaninoff) - 3:54
  - From 1979 album The Korgis
3. "All the Love in the World" (Davis, Warren) - 3:38
  - Single edit. Original version on 1981 album Sticky George
4. "I Just Can't Help It" (Davis) - 3:44
  - Single remix. Original version on 1979 album The Korgis
5. "If It's Alright with You Baby" (Warren) - 4:01
  - From 1980 album Dumb Waiters
6. "That Was My Big Mistake" (Davis, Warren) - 4:01
  - Single edit. Original version on 1981 album Sticky George
7. "Domestic Bliss" (Gordon, Harrison, Warren) - 3:15
  - From 1981 album Sticky George
8. "O Maxine" (Warren) - 2:39
  - From 1979 album The Korgis
9. "Don't Say That It's Over" (Warren) - 2:46
  - From 1981 album Sticky George
10. "Drawn and Quartered" (Warren) - 3:17
  - From 1980 album Dumb Waiters
11. "It's No Good Unless You Love Me" (Warren) - 3:22
  - From 1980 album Dumb Waiters
12. "Rover's Return" (Davis) - 3:31
  - From 1980 album Dumb Waiters
13. "Sticky George" (Harrison, Warren) - 3:36
  - From 1981 album Sticky George
14. "Can't We Be Friends Now" (Warren) - 4:01
  - From 1981 album Sticky George
15. "Foolishness of Love" (Harrison) - 3:31
  - From 1981 album Sticky George
16. "Nowhere to Run" (Davis, Warren) - 4:15
  - Original 1981 album version from Sticky George
17. "Dumb Waiters" (Warren) - 2:42
  - From 1980 album Dumb Waiters
18. "Perfect Hostess" (Davis) - 3:21
  - From 1980 album Dumb Waiters
19. "Love Ain't Too Far Away" (Davis) - 3:29
  - From 1980 album Dumb Waiters
20. "Living on the Rocks" (Warren) - 3:32
  - From 1981 album Sticky George

== Release history ==
- 1997 Rialto Records RMCD 213 (CD)
