= Greatest Hits (The Korgis album) =

Greatest hits album by the Korgis
- Released: 2001
- Recorded: 1977–1981
- Genre: Pop music
- Length: 61:07
- Label: Armoury Records (Germany)
- Producers: The Korgis; James Warren; David Lord

The Korgis chronology
Archive Series (1997)	Greatest Hits (2001)	Klassics – The Best of The Korgis (2001)

Greatest Hits is a compilation album by English pop band the Korgis, released by Armoury Records Germany in 2001.

== Track listing ==
1. "All the Love in the World" (Davis, Warren) - 3:38
  - Single edit. Original version on 1981 album Sticky George
2. "If I Had You" (Davis, Rachmaninoff) - 3:54
  - From 1979 album The Korgis
3. "If It's Alright with You Baby" (Warren) - 4:01
  - From 1980 album Dumb Waiters
4. "Everybody's Got to Learn Sometime" (Warren) - 4:13
  - From 1980 album Dumb Waiters
5. "Can't We Be Friends Now" (Warren) - 4:01
  - From 1981 album Sticky George
6. "Love Ain't Too Far Away" (Davis) - 3:29
  - From 1980 album Dumb Waiters
7. "Nowhere to Run" (Davis, Warren) - 4:15
  - Original 1981 album version from Sticky George
8. "Perfect Hostess" (Davis) - 3:21
  - From 1980 album Dumb Waiters
9. "Drawn and Quartered" (Warren) - 3:17
  - From 1980 album Dumb Waiters
10. "It's No Good Unless You Love Me" (Warren) - 3:22
  - From 1980 album Dumb Waiters
11. "That Was My Big Mistake" (Davis, Warren) - 4:01
  - Single edit. Original version on 1981 album Sticky George
12. "Sticky George" (Harrison, Warren) - 3:36
  - From 1981 album Sticky George
13. "I Just Can't Help It" (Davis) - 3:44
  - Single remix. Original version on 1979 album The Korgis
14. "Don't Say That It's Over" (Warren) - 2:46
  - From 1981 album Sticky George
15. "Living on the Rocks" (Warren) - 3:32
  - From 1981 album Sticky George
16. "O Maxine" (Warren) - 2:39
  - From 1979 album The Korgis
17. "Domestic Bliss" (Gordon, Harrison, Warren) - 3:15
  - From 1981 album Sticky George

== Release history ==
- 2001 Armoury Records Germany ARMCD055
