= The Best of The Korgis =

The Best Of The Korgis

Greatest hits album by The Korgis
- Released: 1983
- Recorded: 1977–1981
- Genre: Pop
- Length: 41:43
- Label: Rialto Records (UK)
- Producer: The Korgis; James Warren; David Lord

The Korgis chronology
Sticky George (1981)	The Best Of The Korgis (1983)	Burning Questions (1987)

The Best of The Korgis is a compilation album of recordings by English pop band The Korgis. It was released on Rialto Records in the UK in 1983.

== Critical reception ==
Upon its release, Stan Speed of The Northern Echo stated, "I didn't think this mob warranted a greatest hits album... and I was right. 'Everybody's Got to Learn Sometime' and 'If I Had You' are fine songs, the rest is romantic twaddle."

== Track listing ==
Side A - Slow Side

1. "Everybody's Got to Learn Sometime" (Warren) - 4:13
  - From 1980 album Dumb Waiters
2. "If I Had You" (Davis, Rachmaninoff) - 3:54
  - From 1979 album The Korgis
3. "All the Love in the World" (Davis, Warren) - 3:38
  - Single edit. Original version on 1981 album Sticky George
4. "I Just Can't Help It" (Davis) - 3:44
  - Single remix. Original version on 1979 album The Korgis
5. "If It's Alright with You Baby" (Warren) - 4:01
  - From 1980 album Dumb Waiters
6. "That Was My Big Mistake" (Davis, Warren) - 4:01
  - Single edit. Original version on 1981 album Sticky George
7. "Wish You A Merry Christmas" (Warren) - 2:55
  - Bonus track included on certain issues released in Continental Europe. On 1988 Japanese CD re-release replaced by "Christmas In Japan" (Warren) - 2:14.

Side B - Fast Side

1. "Domestic Bliss" (Gordon, Harrison, Warren) - 3:15
  - From 1981 album Sticky George
2. "O Maxine" (Warren) - 2:39
  - From 1979 album The Korgis
3. "Don't Say That It's Over" (Warren) - 2:46
  - From 1981 album Sticky George
4. "Drawn and Quartered" (Warren) - 3:17
  - From 1980 album Dumb Waiters
5. "It's No Good Unless You Love Me" (Warren) - 3:22
  - From 1980 album Dumb Waiters
6. "Rover's Return" (Davis) - 3:31
  - From 1980 album Dumb Waiters

== Release history ==
- 1983 Rialto Records KORG 1 (LP)
