= Don't Look Back – The Very Best of The Korgis =

Greatest hits album by The Korgis
- Released: 5 August 2003
- Recorded: 1977–1993
- Genre: Pop
- Length: Disc 1: 59:32; Disc 2: 62:50; Total: 122:22
- Label: Castle Music/Sanctuary (UK); Castle Music/Ryko (U.S.)
- Producer: The Korgis; James Warren; David Lord; Trevor Horn

The Korgis chronology
Klassics – The Best of The Korgis (2001)	Don't Look Back – The Very Best of The Korgis (2003)	Kollection (2005)

Professional ratings
Review scores
Source	Rating
Allmusic	4/5 stars

Don't Look Back – The Very Best of The Korgis is a two disc compilation album by English pop band The Korgis. It was released by Sanctuary Records/Castle Communications in the UK in 2003.

Don't Look Back compiles all three of the group's albums The Korgis, Dumb Waiters, and Sticky George in chronological order, including a few alternate versions, single edits as well as the rare 1982 non-album single "Don't Look Back", produced by Trevor Horn. The compilation has extensive liner notes based on an interview with James Warren and was produced in collaboration with the band.

== Track listing ==
=== Disc one ===
1. "Young 'n' Russian" (Davis, Ridlington, Warren) - 3:12
2. "If I Had You" (Davis, Rachmaninoff) - 3:55
  - Album version
3. "I Just Can't Help It" (Davis) - 3:43
4. "Chinese Girl" (Davis) - 2:19
5. "Art School Annexe" (Davis) - 3:37
6. "Boots and Shoes" (Davis, Warren) - 4:32
7. "Dirty Postcards" (Warren) - 4:45
8. "O Maxine" (Warren) - 2:39
9. "Mount Everest Sings the Blues" (Warren) - 2:32
10. "Cold Tea" (Warren) - 3:50
  - Edited version.
  - Tracks 1–10 from 1979 album The Korgis
11. "Silent Running" (Warren) - 3:05
12. "Love Ain't Too Far Away" (Davis) - 3:29
13. "Perfect Hostess" (Davis) - 3:21
14. "Drawn and Quartered" (Warren) - 3:20
15. "Everybody's Got to Learn Sometime" (Warren) - 4:15
  - Original version.
16. "Intimate" (Davis) - 3:08
17. "It's No Good Unless You Love Me" (Warren) - 3:24
  - Tracks 11–17 from 1980 album Dumb Waiters

=== Disc two ===
1. "If It's Alright with You Baby" (Warren) - 3:45
  - Single edit.
2. "Dumb Waiters" (Warren) - 2:42
3. "Rover's Return" (Davis) - 3:34
4. "Everybody's Got to Learn Sometime" (Warren) - 4:22
  - Alternate version.
  - Tracks 1–4 from 1980 album Dumb Waiters
5. "That Was My Big Mistake" (Davis, Warren) - 4:17
  - Edited version.
6. "All the Love in the World" (Davis, Warren) - 3:40
  - Single edit.
7. "Sticky George" (Harrison, Warren) - 3:36
8. "Can't We Be Friends Now" (Warren) - 4:01
9. "Foolishness of Love" (Harrison) - 3:31
10. "Domestic Bliss" (Gordon, Harrison, Warren) - 3:15
11. "Nowhere to Run" (Davis, Warren) - 5:17
  - Alternate version.
12. "Contraband" (Warren) - 3:18
13. "Don't Say That It's Over" (Warren) - 2:50
14. "Living on the Rocks" (Warren) - 3:32
  - Tracks 5–14 from 1981 album Sticky George
15. "Don't Look Back" (Warren) - 4:12
16. "Xenophobia" (Warren) - 2:27
  - Tracks 15 & 16 from 1982 7" single "Don't Look Back"
17. "Everybody's Gotta Learn Sometime" - 3:51
  - DNA '93 Housey 7" remix

== Personnel ==
- James Warren - vocals, bass guitar, electric guitar, keyboards
- Andy Davis - vocals, drums, keyboards, mandolin, electric guitar
- Phil Harrison - keyboards, percussion, synthesizer, electric piano, drums, spoons
- Stuart Gordon - violin, mandolin, percussion, acoustic guitar, banjo, percussion, background vocals
- Glenn Tommey - keyboards
- David Lord - keyboards
- Bill Birks - drums, percussion
- Al Powell - drums
- Manny Elias - drums
- Jerry Marotta - drums
- Kenny Lacey - percussion
- David Lord - percussion, keyboards
- Stephen Paine - programming
- Keith Warmington - harmonica
- Steve Buck - flute
- Dave Pegler - clarinet
- Chantelle Samuel - bassoon
- Stephanie Nunn - oboe
- Huw Pegler - horn
- Jo Mullet - backing vocals
- Jo Pomeroy - backing vocals
- Ali Cohn - backing vocals
- The Korgettes (Sheena Power & Jo Mullet) - backing vocals

== Production ==
- The Korgis - producers
- David Lord - sound engineer, producer, wind and strings arranger
- Glenn Tommey - assistant engineer
- Trevor Horn - producer track 15, disc 2
- Paul Bevoir - compilation, design
- Jon Smith - compilation coordination
- Steve Hammonds - compilation coordination
- Masterpiece - audio remastering

== Release history ==
- 2003 Music Sanctuary/Castle Music CMDDD 673
