= Kollection =

Compilation album by the Korgis
- Released: 2005
- Recorded: 1978–2004
- Genre: Pop
- Label: Angel Air
- Producer: The Korgis

The Korgis chronology
Don't Look Back – The Very Best of The Korgis (2003)	Kollection (2005)	Unplugged (The Korgis album) (2006)

Alternative cover
- Second edition

Professional ratings
Review scores
Source	Rating
AllMusic	4.5/5 stars

Kollection is a compilation/studio album by English pop band the Korgis. It was released in 2005.

The album contains some of the band's best known songs such as "If I Had You", "Everybody's Gotta Learn Sometime", "All The Love in the World", material from the album This World's for Everyone, four new recordings as well as rarities previously unreleased on CD.

Kollection was originally only available for members of the Korgis fan club and issued in 2004, but was commercially released the following year along with a DVD by the same name.

The album was followed by single "Something About The Beatles", recorded and produced in April 2006 by James Warren and Glenn Tommey.

In 2009, the 2006 version of the Kollection album, including the track "Something About The Beatles", and the Kollection DVD were re-released as a CD/DVD combo under the title Something About The Korgis.

== Track listing ==
1. "If I Had You" (Davis, Rachmaninoff) - 3:58
  - 1993 version. Lead vocal: James Warren. Previously unreleased version.
2. "Everybody's Got to Learn Sometime" (Warren) - 4:09
  - 1990 Version. Lead vocal: James Warren.
3. "It All Comes Down to You" (Baker, Davis, Warren) - 3:40
  - New track 2004. Lead vocal: James Warren.
4. "One Life" (Davis, Warren) - 3:36
  - From 1992 album This World's For Everyone. Lead vocal: John Baker.
5. "Who Are These Tears For" (Warren) - 4:14
  - From 1992 album This World's For Everyone. Lead vocal: James Warren.
6. "Find Yourself Another Fool" (Davis) - 3:56
  - New track 2003. Lead vocal: James Warren.
7. "This World's for Everyone" (Davis, Warren) - 3:28
  - From 1992 album This World's For Everyone. Lead vocal: John Baker.
8. "That's What Friends Are For" (Davis, Ferguson) - 3:47
  - From Andy Davis Band solo CD, 1993. Lead vocal: Andy Davis.
9. "Hold On" (Davis) - 4:12
  - From 1992 album This World's For Everyone. Lead vocal: John Baker.
10. "I Wonder What's Become of You" (Baker, Warren) - 3:25
  - New track 2004. Lead vocal: James Warren.
11. "Work Together" (Davis, Warren) - 3:42
  - From 1992 album This World's For Everyone. Lead vocal: John Baker.
12. "Come to Me" (Lord, Warren) - 3:52
  - New track 2004. Vocals by James Warren.
13. "All the Love in the World" (Davis, Warren) - 4:00
  - New version. Lead vocal: John Baker.
14. "Wish You Merry Xmas" (Baker, Davis, Harrison, Lord, Warren) - 2:55
  - 2003 Version. Lead vocal: James Warren.
15. "Everybody's Got to Learn Sometime" (Warren) - 3:44
  - Slow & Moody DNA 7" Mix '93. Lead vocal: James Warren.
16. "It Won't Be the Same Old Place" (Davis, Warren) - 5:12
  - Bonus track, from James Warren's 1986 solo album Burning Questions. Original 12" remix by David Lord, previously unreleased on CD.
17. "Lines" (Lindsey) - 3:29
  - Bonus track. The first Korgis song ever recorded, September 1978. Previously unreleased.
18. "Boots and Shoes" (Davis Warren) - 4:04
  - Bonus track. 1978 rock demo version. Lead vocal: James Warren. Previously unreleased.
19. "Make a Fuss About Us" (Davis) - 3:32
  - Bonus track. Andy Davis' 1978 demo of "Rover's Return". Previously unreleased.

== Personnel ==
- Andy Davis - keyboards, guitars, backing vocals
- James Warren - guitars, bass guitar, keyboards, lead vocals, backing vocals
- John Baker - guitars, keyboards, lead vocals, backing vocals
- David Lord - keyboards
- Paul Cleaver - drums on "If I Had You"
- Alan Wilder - keyboards on '"If I Had You"
- Dave Goodier - bass on "One Life"
- Stuart Gordon - violin on "Everybody's Gotta Learn Sometime"
- Will Gregory - saxophone on DNA mix
- Sam Howard - backing vocals on "This World's For Everyone" and "One Life"
- Debbie - backing vocals on "This World's For Everyone" and "One Life"
- Helen - backing vocals on "This World's For Everyone" and "One Life"
- John Griffiths - backing vocals on "This World's For Everyone", "One Life", "Work Together"
- Nick Batt
- Steve Lindsey - vocal on "Lines"

== Production ==
- The Korgis - producers
- David Lord - string arrangements
- Glenn Tommey - sound engineer
- Guy Johnson - sound engineer
- Chris Dawson at www.tallhat.com - artwork, new photos

== Release history ==
- 2005 Angel Air SJPCD204

== Single releases ==
- "Something about The Beatles" - 4:08 / "It All Comes Down To You" - 3:37 / "Everybody's Got To Learn Sometime" (1990 Version) - 4:09 (Angel Air RAJP903, June 2006)
