= Don't Look Back =

Don't Look Back may refer to:

== Film and television ==
=== Film ===
- Dont Look Back, a 1967 documentary about Bob Dylan
- Don't Look Back: The Story of Leroy 'Satchel' Paige, a 1981 American television film
- Don't Look Back (1996 film), an American action/thriller television film
- Don't Look Back (1999 film), a Japanese film
- Don't Look Back (2009 film), a French thriller
- Rest Stop: Don't Look Back, a 2008 American horror film

=== Television ===
- Don't Look Back: The Legend of Orpheus, a 2013 South Korean series
- "Don't Look Back" (Degrassi), a 2015 episode
- "Don't Look Back" (Heroes), a 2006 episode
- "Don't Look Back" (In the Heat of the Night), a 1988 episode

== Music ==
- Don't Look Back (concert series), an annual concert series in London

=== Albums ===
- Don't Look Back (Boston album), or the title song (see below), 1978
- Don't Look Back (Celeste Buckingham album), or the title song, 2012
- Don't Look Back (Harold Vick album) or the title track, 1974
- Don't Look Back (John Lee Hooker album), or the 1964 title song (see below), 1997
- Don't Look Back (Nat Adderley album), 1976
- Don't Look Back (Natalie Cole album) or the title song, 1980
- Don't Look Back – The Very Best of The Korgis, 2003
- Don't Look Back, by Al Green, 1993
- Don't Look Back, by Anelia, 2004
- Don't Look Back, by Timo Maas, 2005
- Don't Look Back, an EP by Lola Amour, 2017

=== Songs ===
- "Don't Look Back" (Boston song), 1978
- "Don't Look Back" (Fine Young Cannibals song), 1989
- "Don't Look Back" (Gary Morris song), 1982
- "Don't Look Back" (John Lee Hooker song), 1964
- "Don't Look Back" (The Korgis song), 1982
- "Don't Look Back" (Lloyd Cole song), 1990
- "Don't Look Back" (Lucie Silvas song), 2005
- "Don't Look Back" (Matrix & Futruebound song), 2014
- "Don't Look Back!" (NMB48 song), 2015
- "Don't Look Back" (The Remains song), 1966
- "Don't Look Back" (The Temptations song), 1965; covered by Peter Tosh and Mick Jagger, 1978
- "Don't Look Back" (Thalía song), 2004
- "Don't Look Back", by Ayumi Hamasaki from Rock 'n' Roll Circus, 2010
- "Don't Look Back", by Bruce Springsteen from Tracks, 1998
- "Don't Look Back", by Cutting Crew from Broadcast, 1986
- "Don't Look Back", by Dave Koz and Jeff Koz from Off the Beaten Path, 1996
- "Don't Look Back", by Jackson C. Frank from Jackson C. Frank, 1965
- "Don't Look Back", by Jem from Beachwood Canyon, 2016
- "Don't Look Back", by Madness from "House of Fun", 1982
- "Don't Look Back", by Ryan Elder and Lauren Culja from the Rick and Morty episode "Star Mort Rickturn of the Jerri", 2020
- "Don't Look Back", by She and Him from Volume Two, 2010
- "Don't Look Back", by Telepopmusik from Angel Milk, 2005
- "Don't Look Back (Movement 9)", by Jean Michel Jarre from Equinoxe Infinity, 2018

== Other uses ==
- Don't Look Back (novel), a 1996 novel by Karin Fossum
- Don't Look Back (role-playing game), a 1994 pen-and-paper table-top game
- Don't Look Back (video game), a 2009 platform game
- Don't Look Back, a novel in the Nancy Drew on Campus series
- "Don't Look Back", a storyline in the science fiction comedy webtoon series Live with Yourself!

== See also ==
- Don't Look Up, a 2021 American apocalyptic political satire film
