= Everybody's Got to Learn Sometime =

1980 single by the Korgis

Single by the Korgis

from the album Dumb Waiters
- B-side: "Perfect Hostess"
- Released: 11 April 1980
- Recorded: 1980
- Genre: Synthpop; soft rock
- Length: 4:24
- Label: Rialto
- Songwriter: James Warren
- Producers: The Korgis; David Lord

The Korgis singles chronology
"I Just Can't Help It" (1980)	"Everybody's Got to Learn Sometime" (1980)	"If It's Alright with You Baby" (1980)

"Everybody's Got to Learn Sometime" is a 1980 single written by James Warren and first performed by the British pop band the Korgis, with Warren as the lead singer. It has subsequently been covered by numerous other artists.

== Background ==
"Everybody's Got to Learn Sometime" features a distinctive synthesizer line as primary sound, based on a prominent keyboards arrangement played by Phil Harrison.

The song also is notable for its simple, sparse lyrics, but with a direct message. Related to that, lead singer and bassist James Warren has said that the song took only 10 or 15 minutes to write, after he sang the first thing to come into his mind while he played both the chords and melody on the piano. Although he was a guitarist, Warren had a piano in his flat in Bath, Somerset which he used for song ideas. With "Everybody's Got to Learn Sometime", he aimed to write a "slow, plodd[ing]" ballad and one that would appeal to radio in the United States. Producer David Lord subsequently added the bigger arrangement and strings.

The distinctive instrument played after each chorus is the guzheng, an eighteen-string Chinese zither. The song also features a brief violin section in the middle, as well some pizzicato after each chorus.

About the meaning of the song, Warren said:

At that time I was into new wave [sic] philosophies about working on yourself, meditation and that sort of stuff. The whole lyric comes out of that. It wasn’t a romantic song at all. For me it was all about an individual changing and being a different sort of person – trying to find out the root of your inner confusion, dealing with it and becoming a better person. So it was literally a philosophical lyric.

== Releases ==
The song, from the group's second album, Dumb Waiters, was released on 11 April 1980, and reached number five on the UK Singles Chart and number 18 on the US Billboard Hot 100 chart. The song topped the singles charts in France, was also number one in Spain. It charted at number five in Ireland, number six in Switzerland, number 11 in the Netherlands, number 11 in Australia, number 12 in New Zealand, and number 14 in Belgium. That represented the peak of the Korgis' chart success.

The original 1980 version of "Everybody's Got to Learn Sometime" appears on the following compilation albums and CDs:

- The Best of The Korgis (1983)
- Archive Series (1997)
- Greatest Hits (2001)
- Don't Look Back – The Very Best of The Korgis (CD1) (2 CD) (2003)

In 1989, original members James Warren and Andy Davis reunited the Korgis after they were approached by the Bristol-based International Hostage Release Foundation, who were gathering artists for the recording of a charity album to raise money for their cause. As they did not own the rights to the original 1980 recording, the duo recorded a new version of "Everybody's Got To Learn Sometime" at Coach House Studios in Bristol for the project. Former Korgis member Stuart Gordon returned to perform the violin solo on the recording. Originally due for release as a single in November 1989, the release was delayed until 13 August 1990. The version has appeared on the foundation's 1991 charity album Everybody's Got To Learn Sometime, the band's 1992 album This World's for Everyone and their 2005 compilation CD and DVD Kollection.

In 1993, the Korgis collaborated with the electronic music production duo DNA on a new version of "Everybody's Got to Learn Sometime". The band were inspired to give the song the "'90s treatment" after hearing a number of "dreadful 'rave' cover versions". They approached DNA to work on the track after a chance meeting with them at a studio in Bath. The single, which was released in the UK by Euro Records on 14 June 1993, reached number 78 in the charts.

The Korgis recorded a live, acoustic version of "Everybody's Got to Learn Sometime" in the summer of 2005, which was intended for release on Kollection, but which eventually made its appearance in 2006 on the Unplugged CD.

An alternate version of "Everybody's Got to Learn Sometime", with a different second verse, was included as a bonus track on the 1999 CD re-issue of 1980 album Dumb Waiters. That alternate version also appears on the compilations Klassics – The Best of The Korgis (2001) and Don't Look Back – The Very Best of The Korgis (CD2) (2 CD) (2003), which also includes an uptempo, 3-minute 51-second, version of the song as its closing track, taking the number of variants of the song on the double-CD compilation to three.

When Warren and Davis reformed their first band, Stackridge, in 2007, they incorporated "Everybody's Got to Learn Sometime" into their set, with Warren introducing it as a song he wrote for the Korgis. A live version by Stackridge was included in both the CD and DVD versions of The Forbidden City, recorded at one of the 2007 shows in Bath, England. Keyboardist Glenn Tommey and drummer Andy Marsden, both one-time backing musicians for The Korgis, were part of that incarnation of Stackridge.

In 2019, former Noah and the Whale bassist Matt Owens met Warren and suggested that they collaborate on a new recording of the song. The acoustic and stripped down version included a restored second verse that was omitted from the original recording. It received a release as a digital single in 2025 on the Singsong Music label.

== Critical reception ==
Upon its release, Simon Ludgate of Record Mirror commented, "Soft music for soft minds but don't let that worry you, as this is a hit if ever I heard one. Well-timed for early summer airplay." Jim Whiteford of The Kilmarnock Standard noted the Korgis had followed their hit "If I Had You" with "another sweet melody which tends to stay close to you... rather like aftershave". He added, "The strong title hookline must take it chartwards and make a few more quid for the two ex-Stackridge men."

== Personnel ==
The Korgis

- James Warren – lead vocals, bass guitar, guzheng
- Stuart Gordon – electric guitar, violin
- Andy Davis – drums, bell tree
- Phil Harrison – keyboards

== Charts ==
=== Weekly charts ===
==== Original version ====
Chart (1980–1981)	Peak position
Australia (Kent Music Report)	11
Belgium (Ultratop 50 Flanders)	14
France (IFOP)	1
Ireland (IRMA)	5
Netherlands (Dutch Top 40)	14
Netherlands (Single Top 100)	11
New Zealand (Recorded Music NZ)	12
Switzerland (Schweizer Hitparade)	6
UK Singles (OCC)	5
US Billboard Hot 100	18
US Adult Contemporary (Billboard)	22
US Cash Box Top 100	23
US Record World Singles	29
West Germany (GfK)	48

==== 1993 remix ====
Chart (1993)	Peak position
Ireland (IRMA)	29
UK Singles (Gallup)	78
UK Top 60 Dance Singles (Music Week)	24

Chart (2015)	Peak position
France (SNEP)	133

=== Year-end charts ===
==== Original version ====
Chart (1980)	Position
Australia (Kent Music Report)	88
Belgium (Ultratop Flanders)	68
Netherlands (Dutch Top 40)	99
UK Singles (OCC)	55
US Billboard Hot 100	116

== Baby D version ==
"(Everybody's Got to Learn Sometime) I Need Your Loving"

Single by Baby D

from the album Deliverance
- Released: 22 May 1995
- Genre: Dance-pop; happy hardcore; jungle
- Length: 4:10
- Label: Production House; Systematic
- Songwriter: James Warren
- Producer: Nino/Dice

Baby D singles chronology
"Let Me Be Your Fantasy" (1994)	"(Everybody's Got to Learn Sometime) I Need Your Loving" (1995)	"So Pure" (1996)

Music video
- "(Everybody's Got to Learn Sometime) I Need Your Loving" on YouTube

British electronic music group Baby D recorded a successful cover of the song, released as "(Everybody's Got to Learn Sometime) I Need Your Loving" on 22 May 1995, by Production House and Systematic Records, as the fifth single from their only album, Deliverance (1996). It peaked at number three on the UK Singles Chart, and was also a top-20 hit in Finland, Iceland and Ireland. The accompanying and partially black-and-white music video was a Box Top on British music television channel The Box for three weeks in June 1995.

=== Critical reception ===
Taylor Parkes from Melody Maker praised the song's "spectral saintliness". Pan-European magazine Music & Media wrote, "A female voice in the intro is the first variation on the Korgis' 1980 hit, then dub techniques and electronic percussion are used to take it to the jungle grand finale." Red Rose Rock FM/Preston/Blackpool head of music Andy Roberts said, "It kind of takes you by surprise, as it starts as a ballad and then becomes jungle, which is a very original way of updating an old hit. Now it's charted it proves that the popularity of jungle is no longer restricted to London." Music Week described it as "jungle pop which is right on track with this revamped version", remarking that "an impressive and melodic vocal complements the jungle beat."

Jake Barnes from Muzik viewed it as "jungle-lite". The Record Mirror Dance Update named it "another catchy pop dance track that borrows from the past." In his weekly dance column in Record Mirror, James Hamilton, considered it a "sure-fire smash hit attractively warbled junglistic remake". Tony Cross from Smash Hits gave '(Everybody's Got To Learn Sometime) I Need Your Loving' four out of five, writing, "Proof that pumpin' happy hardcore isn't gonna go away comes with Baby D's return. This is even better than the chart-topping 'Let Me Be Your Fantasy'. Taking a (relatively) unknown '80s song by The Korgis (who?), the dancefloor kings have sunk their butts into turning it into the kind of hypno-trance track that blindin' nights out are made of."

=== Track listing ===
- Europe 12" single - 1995 issue on Systematic Records [SYSCD4]
1. "(Everybody's Got To Learn Sometime) I Need Your Loving" (R.A.F. Zone Mix)
2. "(Everybody's Got To Learn Sometime) I Need Your Loving" (Original Mix)
3. "(Everybody's Got To Learn Sometime) I Need Your Loving" (T.S.O.B. Mix)
4. "(Everybody's Got To Learn Sometime) I Need Your Loving" (Masters of House Mix)
- UK CD single - 1995 issue on Systematic Records [SYSCD4]
1. "(Everybody's Got To Learn Sometime) I Need Your Loving" (Radio Edit) — 4:10
2. "(Everybody's Got To Learn Sometime) I Need Your Loving" (Original Mix) — 5:38
3. "(Everybody's Got To Learn Sometime) I Need Your Loving" (T.S.O.B. Mix) — 6:26
4. "(Everybody's Got To Learn Sometime) I Need Your Loving" (Neil Mclelland Mix) — 5:46
5. "(Everybody's Got To Learn Sometime) I Need Your Loving" (Ray Keith No Sell Out Remix) — 5:28
6. "(Everybody's Got To Learn Sometime) I Need Your Loving" (D-SP Remix) — 6:40

=== Charts ===
==== Weekly charts ====
Chart (1995)	Peak position
Australia (ARIA)	124
Europe (Eurochart Hot 100)	9
Europe (European Dance Radio)	15
Finland (IFPI)	13
Germany (GfK)	55
Iceland (Íslenski Listinn Topp 40)	12
Ireland (IRMA)	13
Israel (Israeli Singles Chart)	17
Netherlands (Dutch Top 40 Tipparade)	5
Netherlands (Dutch Single Tip)	9
Scottish Singles Sales (Official Charts)	14
UK Singles (Official Charts)	3
UK Dance (Official Charts)	5
UK Hip Hop/R&B (Official Charts)	1
UK Airplay (Music Week)	27
UK Club Chart (Music Week)	18
UK Pop Tip Club Chart (Music Week)	3

==== Year-end charts ====
Chart (1995)	Position
UK Singles (OCC)	44
UK Pop Tip Club Chart (Music Week)	19

=== Certifications ===
Region	Certification	Certified units/sales
United Kingdom (BPI)	Silver	200,000^{^}
^{^} Shipments figures based on certification alone.

=== Release history ===
Region	Date	Format(s)	Label(s)	Ref.
United Kingdom	22 May 1995	CD; cassette	Production House; Systematic	
Australia	10 July 1995	CD; cassette	Production House; Systematic; Polydor	

== Other versions ==
"Everybody's Got to Learn Sometime" has been covered many other times over the years, including several versions that reached the UK Singles Chart, including those by the Dream Academy (1987), Brian Davis (1991), Yazz (1994), Army of Lovers (2001) and the Cantamus Girls Choir (2005). NRG covered the song on their 1991 release The Real Hardcore. In 1997, a cappella group the King's Singers recorded the track with lead vocals by James Warren. In 2000, German music duo Marc et Claude sampled the song for their track "I Need Your Lovin' (Like the Sunshine)", with James Warren appearing when the track was on Top Of The Pops. In 2003, Erasure recorded the song on their cover album Other People's Songs.

In September 2004, Zucchero and Vanessa Carlton entered the French charts with their version of the song. That same year, Beck also covered the song for the Michel Gondry film Eternal Sunshine of the Spotless Mind. This version later appeared on Beck’s 2026 Valentine's Day mixtape album, Everybody’s Gotta Learn Sometime.

In 2011, Nicola Roberts released a version of the song on her debut solo album, Cinderella's Eyes.

=== Charts ===
Yazz

Chart (1994)	Peak position
UK Singles (OCC)	56

Marc et Claude

Chart (2000)	Peak position
Europe (Eurochart Hot 100)	40
Germany (GfK)	81
Ireland (IRMA)	28
Scottish Singles Sales (Official Charts)	11
UK Singles (Official Charts)	12
UK Dance (Official Charts)	1

Zucchero and Vanessa Carlton

Chart (2004)	Peak position
France (SNEP)	39

Cantamus Girls Choir

Chart (2005)	Peak position
UK Singles (OCC)	73

Krezip

Chart (2008)	Peak position
Netherlands (Dutch Top 40)	23
Netherlands (Dutch Single Top 100)	32
