= Dumbwaiter (disambiguation) =

A dumbwaiter (lit. "silent waiter") is a small freight elevator.

Dumbwaiter may also refer to:

- Lazy Susan, a small rotating table to serve food on a table
- The Dumb Waiter, a 1957 one-act play by Harold Pinter
- Dumb Waiters, a 1980 album by The Korgis
- "Dumb Waiters" (song), a 1981 song by the Psychedelic Furs
