= Andrew Downes (composer) =

British composer (1950–2023)

- Born: 20 August 1950; Birmingham, England
- Died: 2 January 2023 (aged 72)
- Education: St John's College, Cambridge; Royal College of Music
- Occupations: Composer; academic teacher
- Organization: Birmingham Conservatoire
- Website: www.andrewdownes.com

Andrew Downes (20 August 1950 – 2 January 2023) was a British classical composer. He was head of the School of Composition and Creative Studies at Birmingham Conservatoire from 1992 until 2005. His compositions have been performed and broadcast internationally.

== Early life ==
Downes was born in Handsworth, Birmingham. He attended St. John's College, Cambridge, on a scholarship, receiving his master's degree in composition. In 1974 he studied with Herbert Howells at the Royal College of Music. Downes was head of the School of Composition and Creative Studies at Birmingham Conservatoire from 1992 until 2005, when he retired due to ill health. He kept working as a freelance composer.

== Career ==
In addition to live performances, Downes' music has been broadcast on BBC Radios 2, 3, and 4, BBC TV, France Musique, Italian TV, Austrian Radio, Dutch Radio, Czech Radio, and Central Peking Radio. Seventeen CDs have been made of his music.

His compositions include two substantial choral cantatas. The Marshes of Glynn for the Royal opening of the Adrian Boult Hall in Birmingham in 1986. Song of the Prairies for soprano, mezzo-soprano, tenor and bass soloists, semi-choir of high voices, full chorus and orchestra, is a setting of the 1833 poem 'The Prairies' by William Cullen Bryant. It was commissioned by Shrewsbury School and first performed there in April 1989, directed by John Rutter. Both works have been recorded. There are also three earlier "dramatic cantatas", The Death of Goliath (1978), Cain and Abel (1981) and A Child is Singing (1981), the latter inspired by Adrian Mitchell’s antiwar poem and Hiroshima testimony.

The orchestral showpiece Centenary Fire Dances was first performed for the City of Birmingham's Centenary Festival of Fireworks and Music in 1988. Downes wrote an overture, In The Cotswolds, for the opening of the 1986 Three Choirs Festival, performed by the Gloucestershire Youth Orchestra under Mark Foster. Other orchestral works include the Concerto for Two Guitars, written for Simon Dinnigan and Fred T. Baker and the strings of the City of Birmingham Symphony Orchestra, and the overture Towards a New Age, commissioned for the 150th anniversary of the British Institution of Mechanical Engineers which was premiered at the Symphony Hall, Birmingham, by the Royal Philharmonic Orchestra in 1997.

His vocal music includes songs for the Cantamus Girls Choir, song cycles for Sarah Walker and the tenor John Mitchinson broadcast on BBC Radio 3, and anthems for the BBC 4 Daily Service.

He composed music for horns, including Sonata for Eight Horns for the Horn Octet of the University of New Mexico and Suite for Six Horns for the Vienna Horn Society. After a successful recording of Sonata for Eight Horns by hornists of the Czech Philharmonic Orchestra, Downes was commissioned to write Concerto for four Horns and Orchestra for the orchestra, played at the Dvorak Hall in Prague in February and March 2002. In March 2003 the work was recorded for broadcast by Czech Radio. In 2005, Downes returned to Prague hear the Czech Philharmonic Horns play his Five Dramatic Pieces for Eight Wagner Tubas. There is also a Suite for Brass Sextet, written for the Czech Philharmonic Brass.

Downes composed Song of the Eagle for the James Madison University Flute Choir of Virginia, and Concerto for Two Pianos for the Duo Scaramouche, Sonata for Eight Pianists for soloists from France, Italy and Britain. He wrote Mela Kamavardhani for Indo-Jazz Fusions musicians in Calcutta, Delhi, and Bombay, and Fanfare for Madam Speaker for the installation of Betty Boothroyd MP as Chancellor of the Open University in 1994.

== Personal life ==
Downes was born on 20 August, 1950 to parents Frank and Iris Downes. Frank Downes was a hornist, and [Frank's] brother was a violist.

Downes married his wife, Cynthia, in 1976. She helped him compile the librettos of his dramatic cantatas and published his music under the company name Lynwood Music. They had two daughters, Anna and Paula; two grandsons, Oscar and Maxwell; and two granddaughters, Persephone and Emilia. Both of the Downes daughters became musicians: Anna is a violinist and Paula is a soprano as well as chief executive of Lynwood Music since 2013.

Andrew Downes died on 2 January 2023, at age 72. He died from complications from ankylosing spondylitis; he suffered an accident in 2009 which led to permanent paraplegia.

== Legacy ==
A performance prize in his name, and supported by his family, was begun by Birmingham Conservatoire during his lifetime.
