= The Korgis =

English pop band

- Origin: Bristol, England
- Genres: Pop; new wave; synth-pop
- Years active: 1978–1982; 1985–1986; 1990–1993; 2005–2007; 2017–present
- Labels: Rialto; Asylum; Warner; London; Angel Air; Cherry Red; Resolution
- Spinoff of: Stackridge
- Members: James Warren; John Baker; Al Steele; Paul Smith; Danielle Nicholls
- Past members: Andy Cresswell-Davis; Glenn Tommey; Stuart Gordon; Phil Harrison; Bill Birks; Roy Dodds; Maggie Stewart; Steve Buck; Nigel Hart; Jay Marshall; Ava Volante; Emmy Rivers
- Website: thekorgis.com

The Korgis are an English pop band known mainly for their hit single "Everybody's Got to Learn Sometime" in 1980. The band was originally composed of singer/guitarist/keyboardist Andy Davis (born Andrew Cresswell-Davis 10 August 1949) and singer/bassist James Warren (born 25 August 1951), both former members of 1970s band Stackridge.

== Career ==
The Korgis formed in 1978 when singer/guitarist/keyboardist Andy Davis and singer/bassist James Warren began writing songs and recording demos together. They had known each other since the late 1960s and were both members of Stackridge from their formation in 1969. Warren left the band in 1973 and Davis remained with them until their split in 1976. After his departure from Stackridge, Warren took a break from the music industry before beginning to write songs again in 1977.

In 1978, Warren sent Davis a demo tape of his own songs, along with a note inviting Davis to Bath so that they could work together in the recording studio. Davis liked the songs and agreed to form a new musical partnership with Warren, with the aim of writing commercial, radio-friendly material. The duo wrote a number of songs together and began recording demos at Crescent Studios, which David Lord established in his top-floor flat in Camden Crescent. They subsequently decided to record their eponymous debut album between 1978 and 1979 at Crescent Studios.

The duo released their first single "Young 'n' Russian" in February 1979 on the label Rialto Records, owned by their managers Nick Heath and Tim Heath. Their next single, "If I Had You," was released in May 1979 and moved up to number 13 on the UK Singles Chart, followed by the release of their debut album in July 1979. The follow-up singles, a re-release of "Young 'n' Russian" in October 1979 and "I Just Can't Help It" in January 1980, failed to chart.

The Korgis expanded to a four-piece line-up with the joining of Phil Harrison (keyboards, percussion) and Stuart Gordon (acoustic guitar, violin), and quickly began working on their second album, Dumb Waiters, with producer David Lord. As the album neared completion, Davis departed the band to pursue other musical ventures; he went on to join Slow Twitch Fibres. The lead single, "Everybody's Got to Learn Sometime", was released in April 1980 and achieved international success, becoming a number one hit in three countries, France, Spain and Switzerland. It peaked at number 5 in the UK, 18 in the US and 11 in Australia, and was also a top ten in Belgium, the Netherlands and Italy. The release of Dumb Waiters followed in July 1980, reaching number 40 in the UK. The album spawned three further singles, "If It's Alright with You Baby", "Dumb Waiters" and "Rovers Return".

The Korgis recorded their third album, Sticky George, as a trio, but then Gordon and Harrison departed the band after having disagreements with Warren. The lead single, "That Was My Big Mistake", was released under the name 'James Warren & the Korgis' in April 1981, followed by "All the Love in the World" in June 1981. Sticky George was released in July 1981, with a further single in September 1981, "Don't Say That It's Over". During this period, the band was augmented by numerous personnel for promotional duties, including guitarist John Baker, keyboardist Maggie Stewart and drummer Roy Dodds.

The following year the band was joined by flautist Steve Buck and was contemplating a Korgis Live show that ultimately failed to materialise; leading the band to dissolve and Warren to go solo in 1982. The single "Don't Look Back" was produced by Trevor Horn and issued under the Korgis name by London Records in August 1982. In 1983, the Korgis briefly continued as a duo of Warren and his partner Maggie Stewart. They planned a British tour with the idea of using backing tapes rather than pay to hire additional musicians. The duo booked a concert at the Theatre Royal in Bath in November 1983, but then suffered a setback due to a dispute with the Musicians' Union. An agreement between the union and theatres banned the use of backing tapes in place of real musicians and, in order for the concert to take place at all, the Korgis were forced to perform for free, with all ticket purchasers refunded. The duo were then forced to cancel their planned British tour.

Warren and Davis reunited in 1985 to produce two new Korgis singles, "True Life Confessions" and "Burning Questions". In 1986, Warren released two solo singles, "They Don't Believe In Magic" and "It Won't Be the Same Old Place", followed by a solo album, Burning Questions, and another single, "How Did You Know", in 1987. Davis released his own solo LP, Clevedon Pier, in 1989. That same year saw Warren and former Korgis member John Baker performing in Bath and Bristol areas as a duo called the Beat Brothers. Later in 1989, Warren and Davis reunited the Korgis after they were approached by the Bristol-based International Hostage Release Foundation, who were gathering artists for the recording of a charity album to raise money for their cause. As they did not own the rights to the original 1980 recording, the duo re-recorded their 1980 hit "Everybody's Got to Learn Sometime" for the project, which was released as a single in August 1990.

With John Baker (vocals, guitar, keyboards) returning to the Korgis, the trio recorded a new album between 1991 and 1992. This World's For Everyone was released in certain territories between 1992 and 1994, but the band were not able to secure a release in the UK. In 1993, the Korgis collaborated with the electronic music production duo DNA on a new version of "Everybody's Got to Learn Sometime". It was released as a single in the UK by Euro Records, reaching number 78 in the charts.

That same year, the band planned their first ever live dates. Davis withdrew from the tour project after initial rehearsals, leaving Warren and Baker to recruit four new musicians to take on the road. The band performed a few shows, beginning with the Trinity Centre in Bristol on 24 November 1993, but they soon realised that a profitable tour was not going to be viable and ceased planning any further shows.

In late 1993, the Korgis recorded a version of the Mike Batt-penned song "Bright Eyes", originally performed by Art Garfunkel, in aid of the Bright Eyes Appeal. The appeal was launched by the parents of a six-year-old schoolboy who died in a road accident in 1992 and subsequently, as a donor card carrier, donated a cornea. The parents wanted to try and raise £8,000 towards promoting cornea donations and donor cards. The Korgis recording of "Bright Eyes", with a children's choir version on the B-side, was given a limited tape release in the Bristol area in 1994 to raise funds for the appeal.

In the mid-1990s, the trio decided to put the Korgis on hiatus. 1999 saw the three original Korgis albums being re-issued by Edsel Records, followed by the two-disc anthology Don't Look Back – The Very Best of The Korgis in 2003, issued by Sanctuary Records/Castle Communications. In 2001, the Korgis, again as a trio, began writing and recording new material with Lord returning as co-producer. Five of the tracks from around 2003 to 2004 were included on the 2005 release Kollection. In 2005, the Korgis performed a fourteen-track set, which was filmed and recorded for release on Kollection, as well as Unplugged, which was released on the Angel Air record label the following year.

In 2006, the Korgis released their first single in thirteen years, "Something About the Beatles". This song acknowledges the influences of John Lennon in particular, which was very strong on "If I Had You" and "Everybody's Got to Learn Sometime" which capture the ethereal sounds of Lennon's early 1970s output. The band acknowledged John Lennon's influence in interviews at the time, shortly before his murder.

Former member Stuart Gordon died on 28 August 2014 from lung cancer, aged 63.

When Stackridge took a break from touring in 2014, Warren and Davis organised a tour of the UK in 2015 under the name of the Korgis, using exactly the same five-piece line-up as Stackridge. The re-formed Stackridge usually included some Korgis songs in their live set. Stackridge retired in 2017, and a recording of the farewell concert was released as The Final Bow.

In 2017, Warren, encouraged by guitarist/arranger Al Steele, played some dates as James Warren and Friends. This included a Korgis set, and has led on to the first ever touring version of the Korgis - featuring James Warren. The first gig was at the Sunshine Festival in August 2018, and saw the return of John Baker plus Glenn Tommie from Stackridge (who also played on the original of "Everybody's Got to Learn Sometime"), and Al Steele from the 1990s touring band. During 2019, the band have played in Leeds, Shoreham, Bristol, and the 100 Club in London.

During the Covid lockdown in 2020, the Korgis began recording their first new album in close to 30 years. It was entitled Kartoon World and was released in 2021. The album had a common thread and was a return to the idea of a 'concept album'. In December 2021 the band played the new album in its entirety firstly in Abbotskerswell and then at the Rondo Theatre in Bath. Since then they have performed a string of dates combining old and new material. Reception of the album was unanimously positive with some parties calling it a "career high".

In 2021, the single "Bringing Back the Spirit of Love" reached No1 in Mike Read's Heritage Chart. Subsequent singles, "Always a Sunny Day" and "Lines" have also charted.

In early 2022, the Korgis were asked to release an album for the Japanese market. This is called Kool Hits, Kuriosities & Kollaborations and features some unreleased songs and the single "Always a Sunny Day" co-written and performed by the Korgis & Joe Matera. It also features re-recorded versions of the classic hits, plus some alternative mixes of some tracks from 'Kartoon World'. This album was released in the UK later in the year.

In April 2023 the band launched a new show titled 'The Korgis Time Machine' which incorporated some cover songs that had been influences to the writers. This also saw a new streamlined line-up where John Baker took on the role of keyboards and backing vocal group Born to Win were replaced by Danielle Nicholls.

The Korgis played their final concert as a full band at the Mill Arts & Events Centre in Rayleigh, Essex on 26 September 2026. It became increasingly more difficult to make the project work financially with small venues in the UK under their own financial pressures. Warren and Baker continue to perform as The Korgis (Acoustic). In October 2026, they supported David Essex for a second time and also announced that they would be supporting Cock Robin in France on 2 April 2027. They will be touring a new show called The Harmony Game in 2027, featuring songs of the Korgis and also those of the Everly Brothers and Simon & Garfunkel.

== Cover versions ==
In September 2004, Zucchero and Vanessa Carlton entered the French charts, with their cover version of "Everybody's Got to Learn Sometime" and had some success. That same year, Beck also covered the song for the Michel Gondry film Eternal Sunshine of the Spotless Mind. In 2003 it was included on Erasure's cover album Other People's Songs.

Other cover versions of "Everybody's Got to Learn Sometime" also took the song back into the UK Singles Chart over the years, including those by The Dream Academy (1987), Yazz (1994), Baby D (1995) and Army of Lovers (1995). Tracey Ullman and Rod Stewart have also covered "If I Had You".

In 2010, Sharon Corr, of The Corrs, released a version of "Everybody's Got to Learn Sometime" on her solo album Dream of You.

In 2011, Nicola Roberts included a version of the song on her debut album Cinderella's Eyes, released during the hiatus of pop band Girls Aloud.

== Members ==
Current members

- James Warren – bass, vocals, guitar, keyboards (1978–1982, 1985–1986, 1990–1993, 2005–present)
- John Baker – keyboards, vocals, guitar (1980–1982, 1990–1993, 2005–2014, 2017–present)
- Al Steele – guitar, keyboards (1993, 2017–present)
- Paul Smith – drums (2017–present)
- Danielle Nicholls – vocals, percussion, guitar (2023–present)

Former members

- Andy Cresswell-Davis – guitars, vocals, keyboards, drums (1978–1980, 1990–1993, 2005–2007)
- Glenn Tommey – keyboards, vocals (2015–2019)
- Stuart Gordon – violin (1979–1981; died 2014)
- Phil Harrison – keyboards (1979–1981)
- Bill Birks – drums, acoustic guitar (1979)
- Roy Dodds – drums (1980–1982)
- Maggie Stewart – keyboards (1980–1982)
- Steve Buck – flute, drums (1981–1982)

Touring musicians

- Nigel Hart – keyboards, (2019–present)
- Jay Marshall – backing vocals (2017–present)
- Emmy Rivers – backing vocals (2017–present)
- Ava Volante – backing vocals (2017–present)
- Eddie John – drums, vocals (2015)
- Clare Lindley – violin, guitar, vocals (2015)

== Discography ==
=== Studio albums ===
Year	Album	Peak chart positions	
Year	Album	UK	US
1979	The Korgis	—	—
1980	Dumb Waiters	40	113
1981	Sticky George	—	—
1987	Burning Questions (James Warren solo album)	—	—
1992	This World's for Everyone	—	—
2007	Folk & Pop Classics	—	—
2021	Kartoon World	—	—
2022	Kool Hits, Kuriosities & Kollaborations	—	—
"—" denotes releases that did not chart.

=== Compilation albums ===
- The Best of The Korgis (1983)
- The Best of & the Rest of The Korgis (1990)
- Archive Series (1997)
- Greatest Hits (2001)
- Klassics – The Best of The Korgis (2001)
- Don't Look Back – The Very Best of The Korgis (2 CD) (2003)
- Kollection (2005)

=== Live albums ===
- Unplugged (2006)

=== Singles ===
Year	Title	Peak chart positions					Album
Year	Title	UK	US	AUS	FRA	NL	Album
1979	"Young 'n' Russian"	―	―	―	―	―	The Korgis
1979	"If I Had You"	13	―	―	―	―	The Korgis
1979	"Young 'n' Russian" (reissue)	―	―	―	―	―	The Korgis
1980	"I Just Can't Help It"	―	―	―	―	―	The Korgis
1980	"Everybody's Got to Learn Sometime"	5	18	11	1	11	Dumb Waiters
1980	"If It's Alright with You Baby"	56	―	―	―	39	Dumb Waiters
1980	"Dumb Waiters"	―	―	―	―	―	Dumb Waiters
1980	"Rover's Return"	―	―	―	―	12	Dumb Waiters
1981	"That Was My Big Mistake"	―	―	―	―	―	Sticky George
1981	"All the Love in the World"	―	―	―	―	―	Sticky George
1981	"Don't Say That It's Over"	―	―	―	―	―	Sticky George
1981	"Sticky George"	―	―	―	―	―	Sticky George
1982	"Don't Look Back"	―	―	―	―	―	Non-album single
1985	"True Life Confessions"	166	―	―	―	37	Burning Questions
1985	"Burning Questions"	―	―	―	―	―	Burning Questions
1986	"They Don't Believe in Magic" (credited to James Warren)	―	―	―	―	―	Burning Questions
1986	"It Won't Be the Same Old Place" (credited to James Warren)	―	―	―	―	―	Burning Questions
1987	"How Did You Know?" (credited to James Warren)	―	―	―	―	―	Non-album single
1988	"True Life Confessions" (remix)	―	―	―	―	―	Non-album single
1990	"Everybody's Gotta Learn Sometime" (re-recording)	―	―	―	―	―	Everybody's Got To Learn Sometime (International Hostage Release)
1993	"One Life"	―	―	―	―	―	This World's for Everyone
1993	"Hold On"	―	―	―	―	―	This World's for Everyone
1993	"Everybody's Got to Learn Sometime" (DNA Mix)	78	―	―	―	―	Non-album single
2006	"Something About the Beatles"	―	―	―	―	―	Non-album single
2020	"The Ghost of You"	―	―	―	―	―	Kartoon World
2020	"Bringing Back the Spirit of Love"	―	―	―	―	―	Kartoon World
2021	"Time (Song for Dom)"	―	―	―	―	―	Kartoon World
2021	"Magic Money Tree"	―	―	―	―	―	Kartoon World
2021	"The Best Thing You Can Do Is to Love Someone"	―	―	―	―	―	Kartoon World
2022	"Always a Sunny Day" (with Joe Matera)	―	―	―	―	―	Non-album single
2023	"Oppenheimer (Stuck in this Moment)"	―	―	―	―	―	UN-United Nations RED
"—" denotes releases that did not chart or were not released in that territory.

== See also ==
- Stackridge
- List of 1980s one-hit wonders in the United States
