= Jeffrey Edwards =

Jeffrey Edwards may refer to:

- Jeff Edwards (born 1959), American author of military thrillers
- Jeffery Edwards (born 1945), British artist
