= This World's for Everyone =

Studio album by The Korgis
- Released: 1992, 1993
- Recorded: 1990–1992, 1993
- Genre: Pop
- Length: 51:12 (Germany 55:31)
- Label: Euro (Netherlands); Sound Records (Spain); Alfa (Japan); Eurostar (Germany)
- Producer: The Korgis

The Korgis chronology
The Best of & the Rest of The Korgis (1990)	This World's for Everyone (1992)	Archive Series (1997)

Alternative cover
- German edition.

This World's For Everyone is the fourth studio album by English pop band The Korgis. It was released in France, the Netherlands, Spain and Japan in 1992 and in Germany in 1993.

The album includes the 1990 charity single version of "Everybody's Got to Learn Sometime" (originally recorded for Dumb Waiters, 1980) recorded for the International Hostage Release Foundation, single "One Life" as well as a new rendition of "All The Love In The World" (from Sticky George, 1981).

The German 1993 re-release of the album adds the DNA dance remix of "Everybody's Got to Learn Sometime" as a bonus track.

The album was finally released in the UK 2007 by Angel Air Records with five bonus tracks.

== Background ==
In 1989, original Korgis member James Warren and former Korgis member John Baker were performing in Bath and Bristol areas as a duo called the Beat Brothers. Later in the year, Warren and original Korgis member Andy Davis reunited after they were approached by the Bristol-based International Hostage Release Foundation, who were gathering artists for the recording of a charity album to raise money for their cause. The duo re-recorded their 1980 hit "Everybody's Got to Learn Sometime" for the project. Originally due for release as a single in November 1989, the release was delayed until August 1990.

In 1990, Davis suggested to Warren that they record a new Korgis album based on the material he believed they must individually have lying around as songwriters. Warren agreed and the pair decided to make the Korgis a trio by inviting Baker as the main vocalist. After months of trying, the band were unable to secure a recording contract in the UK and decided to record and produce the album themselves. This World's for Everyone was recorded over the course of 1991 and 1992 at the band's Ha'penny Bridge Studios in Bath, which they converted themselves from a derelict former British Rail building, and at David Lord's Terra Incognita studio in Bath. Speaking to the Western Daily Press in 1992, Warren said, "We are excited it's all gone so well, pure magic." The album prominently featured Davis's Hammond B-3 organ, which he had acquired from a derelict church.

With the band unable to secure a deal for a UK release of the album, they focused on securing licensing deals in other territories. A deal was quickly signed for a release in France with Jacques Attali's independent label JBM. Attali had previously worked with the Korgis under the Disques Vogue label in the early 1980s. A deal was also secured for Japan via Alfa Records, the Netherlands via Dureco, and Spain via Sanni Records. In 1993, it was released in Germany by Eurostar with a different sleeve, followed by a release in South Korea via Jigu Records in 1994. It did not receive a UK release until 2007, when it was issued on CD by Angel Air Records with five bonus tracks.

In 1993, the band planned their first ever live dates. Davis withdrew from the tour project after initial rehearsals, leaving Warren and Baker to recruit four new musicians to take on the road. The band performed a few shows, beginning with the Trinity Centre in Bristol on 24 November 1993, but they soon realised that a profitable tour was not going to be viable and ceased planning any further shows.

In a 2025 interview with The Strange Brew Podcast, Warren recalled, "I think it was a good album, [but] we should've had an outside producer. Some tracks work pretty well, but it probably would've benefitted from someone else producing. We were so anonymous by that time that general public weren't interested."

== Critical reception ==
Professional ratings
Review scores
Source	Rating
AllMusic	4.5/5 stars
The Encyclopedia of Popular Music	2/4 stars

Jo-Ann Greene of AllMusic described the Korgis as a "sophisticated pop group" who "reached new aural heights of lushness" with This World's for Everyone. She noted that "strong melodies and catchy choruses reign supreme, with every song emphasizing the band's exquisite vocals and ferocious musical talent".

== Track listing ==
1. "This World's for Everyone" (James Warren/Andy Davis) - 3:26
2. "Hold on" (Andy Davis) - 4:08
  - German edition: remix - 4:36
3. "Work Together" (Andy Davis/James Warren) - 3:42
4. "Hunger" (re-recording) (Andy Davis/Pete Brandt) - 4:49
5. "Show Me" (Helen Turner/Debbie Clarkson/Andy Davis) - 3:43
6. "Who Are These Tears for Anyway" (James Warren) - 4:14
7. "One Life" (James Warren/Andy Davis) - 3:35
8. "Love Turned Me Around" (Helen Turner/Debbie Clarkson/Andy Davis) - 5:00
9. "Wreckage of a Broken Heart" (Andy Davis/James Warren) - 3:12
10. "All the Love in the World" (1992 re-recording) (Andy Davis/James Warren) - 3:15
11. "Third Time Around" (Andy Davis/Kim Beacon) - 3:49
12. "Everybody's Got to Learn Sometime" (1990 re-recording) - 4:09

Bonus track German 1993 edition

13. "Everybody's Got To Learn Sometime" (DNA House Mix 7") - 3:51

Bonus tracks 2008 re-release

13. "This World’s for Everyone" (Demo)
14. "Hold On" (Alternative mix)
15. "All The Love In The World" (Alternative recording)
16. "The Way I Feel" (Previously unreleased)
17. "Mount Everest Sings the Blues" (Live)

== Personnel ==
- Andy Davis - keyboards, guitars, backing vocals, drum programming, chorus choir "This World's For Everyone" and "One Life"
- John Baker - vocals, guitars, keyboards, chorus choir "This World's For Everyone" and "One Life"
- James Warren - vocals, guitars, bass guitar, chorus choir "This World's For Everyone" and "One Life"

Additional personnel

- David Lord - additional keyboards
- Dave Goodier - bass guitar on "One Life"
- Helen Turner - piano on "Love Turned Me Around", chorus choir "This World's For Everyone" and "One Life"
- Sam Howard - backing vocals on "Love Turned Me Around", chorus choir "This World's For Everyone" and "One Life"
- John Griffiths - backing vocals on "Work Together", chorus choir "This World's For Everyone" and "One Life"
- Stuart Gordon - violin solo on "Everybody's Got to Learn Sometime"
- Debbie Clarkson - chorus choir "This World's For Everyone" and "One Life"

== Production ==
- The Korgis - producers
- Andy Davis - arranger
- David Lord - compilation, mastering
- Bob Whitfield - photography
- Tim Odam, TJO Design - design
- Recorded at Ha'penny Bridge Studios, Bath, England and Terra Incognita, Bath, England.

== Single releases ==
Format CD unless otherwise noted.

- "Everybody's Got to Learn Sometime" (1990 re-recording) - 4:09 / "Everybody's Got to Learn Sometime" (Instrumental) - 4:09 / "This World's for Everyone" (Home demo version) - 3:07 (International Hostage FM 12 VHF 65, 1990)
- "One Life" - 3:36 / "Wreckage of a Broken Heart" - 3:12 / "No Love in the World" (non-album track) (Andy Davis/Pete Byrne) - 3:39 (Dureco 1104272, 1992)
- The Korgis, DNA vs. N-R-G: "Everybody's Got to Learn Sometime - 1993 Remixes" (Slow & Moody 7") - 3:43 / (Slow & Moody 12") - 5:24 / (12" Disco Heaven Mix) - 6:47 /(Housey 7") - 3:51 (Euro Records EURY3CD UK & Eurostar 39811025 Germany, 1993)
- "Everybody's Got to Learn Sometime" (DNA Disco Heaven Mix) / "Everybody's Got to Learn Sometime" (DNA Slow + Moody Mix) (12", Euro Records EURY 3X, UK 1993)
- "Everybody's Got to Learn Sometime" (Sue Me Please Mix) / "Everybody's Got to Learn Sometime" (Berlin Mix) (12", Euro Records EURY 3XX, UK 1993)
