= Born in Captivity =

Studio album by Roy Harper
- Released: 1984
- Recorded: England
- Genres: Folk rock, progressive folk
- Labels: Hardup PUB 5002, Awareness AWL1001, Science Friction HUCD008
- Producer: Roy Harper

Roy Harper chronology
Work of Heart (1982)	Born in Captivity (1984)	Whatever Happened to Jugula? (1985)

Professional ratings
Review scores
Source	Rating
Allmusic	2.5/5 stars

Born in Captivity is the 12th studio album by English folk / rock singer-songwriter and guitarist Roy Harper. It was first released in 1984. Essentially, Born in Captivity is the demo tape for his previous 1982 release, Work of Heart.

== History ==
Originally, Born in Captivity was released as a collector's item on Harper's Hardup label. 830 copies were made and sold quickly to Harper's fans. Demand was such that the record was reissued in 1985 (with variations to the sleeve notes, colours and labels) on the Awareness Records label. Awareness Records also released cassette and CD versions in 1989.

In 1994, Harper's own label, Science Friction, combined Born in Captivity with Work of Heart to form the double CD version of this album currently available.

The album's cover shows Harper behind bars, the numbers "120641" represent his date of birth (12 June 1941) and the "No.006" is a reference to Patrick McGoohans character, "Number Six", in the British, 1960s TV programme, The Prisoner. Harper referenced this programme earlier in his career on his 1969 album Folkjokeopus, with a track entitled "McGoohans Blues". The song "Stan" references famous footballer Sir Stanley Matthews of Blackpool F.C. and England. A finished version of "Elizabeth" appeared on Harper's 1985 album Whatever Happened to Jugula?.

N.B. The songs "No Woman is Safe" and "Jack of Hearts" are basically the same, containing identical lyrics.

== Track listing ==
All tracks credited to Roy Harper

=== Side one ===
1. "Stan" – 5:03
2. "Drawn to the Flames" (Demo Version) – 4:43
3. "Come to Bed Eyes" – 4:20
4. "No Woman Is Safe"* – 4:42
5. "I Am a Child" (Demo Version) – 3:59
6. "Elizabeth" – 4:47

=== Side two ===
1. "Work of Heart" (Demo Version) – 19:20
  1. "No One Ever Gets Out Alive"
  2. "Two Lovers in the Moon"
  3. "We Are the People"
  4. "All Us Children (So Sadly Far Apart)"
  5. "We Are the People" (reprise)
  6. "No One Ever Gets Out Alive" (finale)

== 1994 double CD reissue ==
=== Disc one – Born in Captivity ===
1. "Stan" – 5:03
2. "Drawn to the Flames" (Demo Version) – 4:43
3. "Come To Bed Eyes" – 4:20
4. "No Woman Is Safe"* – 4:42
5. "I Am A Child" (Demo Version) – 3:59
6. "Elizabeth" – 4:47
7. "Work of Heart" (Demo Version) – 19:20
  1. "No One Ever Gets Out Alive"
  2. "Two Lovers in the Moon"
  3. "We Are the People"
  4. "All Us Children (So Sadly Far Apart)"
  5. "We Are the People" (reprise)
  6. "No One Ever Gets Out Alive" (finale)

=== Disc two – Work of Heart ===
1. "Drawn To The Flames" – 6:34
2. "Jack Of Hearts"* – 4:14
3. "I Am A Child" – 3:09
4. "Woman" – 4:42
5. "I Still Care" – 4:50
6. "Work of Heart" – 21:32
  1. "No One Ever Gets Out Alive"
  2. "Two Lovers in the Moon"
  3. "We Are the People"
  4. "All Us Children (So Sadly Far Apart)"
  5. "We Are the People" (reprise)
  6. "No One Ever Gets Out Alive" (finale)

(* The songs "Jack of Hearts" and "No Woman is safe" are basically the same, containing identical lyrics.)

== Personnel ==
- Roy Harper- vocals and guitar
