= Lady of Quality =

1972 novel by Georgette Heyer

- First UK edition
- Author: Georgette Heyer
- Cover artist: Edward Mortelmans
- Language: English
- Genre: Regency, Romance
- Publisher: The Bodley Head (UK); E.P. Dutton (US)
- Publication date: 1972
- Publication place: United Kingdom
- Media type: Print
- Pages: 336 pp
- ISBN: 0-370-01479-0
- OCLC: 183258813
- Dewey Decimal: 823/.912 22
- LC Class: PR6015.E795 L34 2007

Lady of Quality is the final Regency romance written by Georgette Heyer. Published in the UK by The Bodley Head in 1972, and by E. P. Dutton in the U. S., it was the last of her novels to be published during her lifetime.

The story describes the romantic relationship between the wealthy Annis Wychwood, who has grown bored with her independent lifestyle, and Oliver Carleton, a libertine who cares little for society's opinion of him. The two have deliberately avoided marriage for many years and are slow to acknowledge the growth of their feelings for each other.

== Plot summary ==
The novel is set in Bath during the Regency era, somewhere around 1818. Some years before, the beautiful and intelligent Annis Wychwood, having an independent fortune of her own, has left Twynham Park, the home of her brother Sir Geoffrey Wychwood. She now has a household of her own in Upper Camden Place in Bath, where she lives independently with control over her personal and financial affairs. The one sacrifice she has made to convention has been to invite her elderly cousin, the incessantly chattering Maria Farlow, to share her household in order to keep up appearances.

As the story opens, Annis is aged 29 and, though a social success in the city, is still single, having turned down all offers of marriage. On the way back from a visit to her brother, she encounters seventeen-year-old Lucilla Carleton, who is running away to Bath to avoid the marriage her domineering relatives insist on to her childhood friend, Ninian Elmore. The compliant Ninian, however, has offered to escort Lucilla and ensure her safe arrival. Since Ninian's gig has lost a wheel on the snowy road, Annis volunteers to chaperone the girl until she can make her own arrangements. To her mind, the adventure offers a means of dispelling the conventional boredom of her life.

Lucilla's uncle, Oliver Carleton, visits Bath to investigate Lucilla's new living arrangements. Carleton is not only a rake, but his sense of superiority and outspoken manner has earned him the label of "the rudest man in England". He and Annis, however, soon find mutual enjoyment in their heated exchanges and, as their unlikely friendship develops, they discover deeper feelings for each other. Carleton eventually proposes marriage, but Annis refuses, unsure in her own mind and unwilling to relinquish her independence. Using the excuse that he must find Lucilla a new guardian, Carleton then returns to London.

Annis's brother, Sir Geoffrey, has heard rumours of her developing relationship with Carleton and seeks to hinder it by sending his wife and children to stay with her. Soon after their arrival, members of the household contract influenza, and Annis nurses them until she too becomes infected. When Carleton hears that Annis is seriously ill, he returns to Bath, arriving on the first day that she is able to get out of bed, and roughly insists that she marry him. However, their tender tryst is continually interrupted. A maid brings in barley water and is sent to fetch Burgundy wine instead. Then Miss Farlow bursts in to protect her companion's virtue and has to be forcibly ejected by Carleton. Finally, Sir Geoffrey arrives at the house, but accuses Miss Farlow of being an "infernal gabster" and drunk when she comes to him with her tales.

Though Sir Geoffrey disapproves the match, he is softened by Carleton's understanding of his point of view when they meet, and even more by the report of Carleton's treatment of Miss Farlow, whom he detests. Finally Lady Wychwood, always a great friend of her sister-in-law, talks him round to the view that Carleton's character is not as bad as his reputation and Annis is left to recuperate from the excitements of the morning.

== Genre and themes ==
Like many of Heyer's novels, Lady of Quality is a Regency romance, relying heavily on its setting as a plot device. As noted by literary critic Kay Mussell, Heyer's Regency romances revolved around a "structured social ritual – the marriage market represented by the London season" where "all are in danger of ostracism for inappropriate behavior". Heyer's novels were known for their painstaking attention to detail, which she used to infuse the novels with the "tone of the time".

The heroine, Annis, is one of Heyer's more modern characters. Her wealth and spinsterhood allow her a level of freedom that is unusual in a Heyer novel, as it was in the Regency period. Many of the actions Annis takes, such as moving to a different city despite her family's objections, were common among women living in the 1970s when the novel was written, but in a Regency setting they mark Annis as a bold and unusually independent woman.

Heyer's hero, Carleton, is a worldly and independent man, similar to those found in many of her other novels. In a departure from her other novels however, Carleton is an "unrepentant hero" who refuses to apologise for his past misdeeds and sees no need to change aspects of his behaviour such as his temper. Although in most romance novels the hero changes throughout the course of the narrative, in Lady of Quality Carleton is essentially the same character at the novel's conclusion that he was at its beginning. The sole difference is his realisation that he loves Annis and wishes to marry her.

In contrast to his defiance of society in matters of his own relationships, Carleton is tasked with supervising his niece Lucilla. He must ensure that she is not drawn into a scandal, ruining her prospects of marriage, a role Heyer often gives to her heroes. It is rare that her heroines are given the same responsibility, but in this novel Annis chooses to become involved in shepherding Lucilla through society. Like the hero, the heroine ignores the standards of propriety when she chooses, yet also shelters Lucilla from following her example, as Annis thinks the younger woman lacks the experience to properly judge when it is appropriate to disregard society's mores. Annis's age, and the life experience she has gained, give her a greater ability to manipulate the social standards of her time than a young ingenue. As in Heyer's other novels, her word choice frequently highlights the fact that the heroine's behavior diverges from the socially accepted feminine ideal of the Regency period. Rather than repel others, the unwillingness to conform to the expected behavioural norms endears the heroine to the hero.

== Publication and reception ==
Heyer wrote Lady of Quality under pressure to meet her publisher's deadline for the autumn list and received for it a £10,000 advance. Exact publication figures are unavailable for this book, but a first printing of one of Heyer's novels in the British Commonwealth often consisted of 65,000–75,000 copies, and each of her books generally sold over 500,000 copies in paperback. As with Heyer's other popular fiction, it was largely ignored by contemporary critics; only after her death did they begin to take more interest in her work.

Philippa Toomey, a literary critic for The Times, wrote a short review of Lady of Quality soon after its publication, identifying in it a "bat's squeak of sexuality". While noting that the plots of all Heyer's romance novels were similar, Toomey described Lady of Quality as "almost identical twins" with Heyer's earlier work Black Sheep. Despite the formulaic nature of the plot, Toomey believed that Heyer fans would enjoy the novel, as it showcased Heyer's skill in creating interesting characters who acted appropriately for their setting. On the other hand, Heyer's biographer, Jane Aiken Hodge, later commented that the "book would have benefitted from the light hand of an editor"; in particular she found that the plot "lost momentum about three-quarters of the way through".

Lady of Quality was profiled in Pamela Regis's 2003 book A Natural History of the Romance Novel, describing the relationship between the protagonists as very modern; both are financially independent and neither cares overly much for the opinions of others. Literary critic Karin Westman, writing at about the same time, agreed while noting that the novel provides "a vision of marriage as companionship, a union which does not require ceding independence ... thanks to a heroine who can conduct herself as a hero". This is consistent with Jane Aiken Hodge's earlier finding that "This book is a discussion of marriage as a reality beyond the happy ending".

== Sources ==
- Byatt, A. S. (5 October 1975). "The Ferocious Reticence of Georgette Heyer". In Fahnestock-Thomas, Mary (ed.). Georgette Heyer: A Critical Retrospective. Saraland, AL: Prinnyworld Press (published 2001). pp. 289–303. ISBN 978-0-9668005-3-1.
- Devlin, James P. (Summer 1984). "The Mysteries of Georgette Heyer: A Janeite's Life of Crime". In Fahnestock-Thomas, Mary (ed.). Georgette Heyer: A Critical Retrospective. Saraland, AL: Prinnyworld Press (published 2001). pp. 359–394. ISBN 978-0-9668005-3-1.
- Hodge, Jane Aiken (1984). The Private World of Georgette Heyer. London: The Bodley Head. ISBN 0-09-949349-7.
- Mussell, Kay (1984). "Fantasy and Reconciliation". In Fahnestock-Thomas, Mary (ed.). Georgette Heyer: A Critical Retrospective. Saraland, AL: Prinnyworld Press (published 2001). pp. 412–417. ISBN 978-0-9668005-3-1.
- Regis, Pamela (2003). A Natural History of the Romance Novel. Philadelphia, PA: University of Pennsylvania Press. ISBN 0-8122-3303-4.
- Reinhardt, Max (12 July 1974). "Georgette Heyer". In Fahnestock-Thomas, Mary (ed.). Georgette Heyer: A Critical Retrospective. Saraland, AL: Prinnyworld Press (published 2001). pp. 257–258. ISBN 978-0-9668005-3-1.
- Robinson, Lillian S. (1978). "On Reading Trash". In Fahnestock-Thomas, Mary (ed.). Georgette Heyer: A Critical Retrospective. Saraland, AL: Prinnyworld Press (published 2001). pp. 321–335. ISBN 978-0-9668005-3-1.
- Westman, Karin E. (2003). "A Story of Her Weaving: The Self-Authoring Heroines of Georgette Heyer's Regency Romance". In Strehle, Susan; Carden, Mary Paniccia (eds.). Doubled Plots: Romance and History. Jackson, MS: University of Mississippi Press. ISBN 1-57806-590-9.
