= Work of Heart =

Studio album by Roy Harper
- Released: 1982
- Recorded: England
- Genre: Rock
- Length: 45:01
- Label: Public PUBLP 5001, Awareness AWL1002, Science Friction HUCD008
- Producer: Roy Harper, David Lord

Roy Harper chronology
The Unknown Soldier (1980)	Work of Heart (1982)	Born in Captivity (1984)

Reissue cover
- Awareness Records (reissue cover)

Professional ratings
Review scores
Source	Rating
Allmusic	2/5 stars

Work of Heart is the 11th studio album by English folk / rock singer-songwriter and guitarist Roy Harper and was first released in 1982.

== History ==
The original album was released on Harper's own label, Public Records, formed with Mark Thompson, (son of historian and nuclear campaigner E.P. Thompson). Additionally, the album was chosen by Derek Jewell of The Sunday Times as "Album of the Year" in 1982.

The demo version of this album was later released (in 1984) on a limited edition (830 copies) vinyl release, titled Born in Captivity. The sound of Born in Captivity being more typical of previous Harper recordings; featuring him and guitar only.

Whilst Harper describes this period as his musical career nadir, it came at a time of the zenith for the United Kingdom hi-fi industry. Harper released a very limited number of so-called "Real-Time Mastered" compact audio cassette copies of the Work of Heart album. Unlike mass-market cassettes which at the time were produced at high speed from a multi-generational copy of the master, these issues were transcribed in real time from the original two track studio master tape. To eke maximum sound quality from this technique, the tape stock used was high quality Maxell Type I ferric oxide stock in conjunction with Dolby B Noise Reduction.

Work of Heart together with Born in Captivity form the double CD version of this album currently available.

== Track listing ==
All tracks credited to Roy Harper

=== Side one ===
1. "Drawn to the Flames" – 6:34
2. "Jack of Hearts"* – 4:14
3. "I Am a Child" – 3:09
4. "Woman" – 4:42
5. "I Still Care" – 4:50

=== Side two ===
1. "Work of Heart" – 21:32
  1. "No One Ever Gets Out Alive"
  2. "Two Lovers in the Moon"
  3. "We Are the People"
  4. "All Us Children (So Sadly Far Apart)"
  5. "We Are the People" (reprise)
  6. "No One Ever Gets Out Alive" (finale)

== 1994 double CD reissue ==
=== Disc one – Born in Captivity ===
1. "Stan" – 5:03
2. "Drawn to the Flames" (Demo Version) – 4:43
3. "Come To Bed Eyes" – 4:20
4. "No Woman Is Safe"* – 4:42
5. "I Am A Child" (Demo Version) – 3:59
6. "Elizabeth" – 4:47
7. "Work of Heart" (Demo Version) – 19:20
  1. "No One Ever Gets Out Alive"
  2. "Two Lovers in the Moon"
  3. "We Are the People"
  4. "All Us Children (So Sadly Far Apart)"
  5. "We Are the People" (reprise)
  6. "No One Ever Gets Out Alive" (finale)

=== Disc two – Work of Heart ===
1. "Drawn To The Flames" – 6:34
2. "Jack Of Hearts"* – 4:14
3. "I Am A Child" – 3:09
4. "Woman" – 4:42
5. "I Still Care" – 4:50
6. "Work of Heart" – 21:32
  1. "No One Ever Gets Out Alive"
  2. "Two Lovers in the Moon"
  3. "We Are the People"
  4. "All Us Children (So Sadly Far Apart)"
  5. "We Are the People" (reprise)
  6. "No One Ever Gets Out Alive" (finale)

(* The songs "Jack of Hearts" and "No Woman is safe" are basically the same, containing identical lyrics.)

== Personnel ==
- Roy Harper – electric and acoustic guitars, lead vocals, additional synthesisers
- Bob Wilson – electric and acoustic guitars, backing vocals
- Tony Franklin – electric bass, fretless bass, percussion, backing vocals
- Dave Morris – pianos, synthesisers, clarinet, viola
- Charlie Morgan – drums
- Dick Morrissey – saxophone
- Darrell Lockhart – drums ("Woman" and "I Am A Child")
- Dorian Healey – additional drums
- Paul Cobbold – additional bass
- Dave Morgan – Oberheim DMX
- David Lord – tubular bells, additional synthesisers
- Yvonne D'Cruz – additional vocals ("Woman")
- John David – backing vocals
- John Leckie – engineer
- Tom Oliver – assistant engineer
- Paul Cobbold – engineer
- David Lord – engineer
- M E Thompson – executive producer
