= Clevedon Pier (album) =

Studio album by Andy Davis
- Released: 1989 (UK); 1991 (US)
- Length: 58:21
- Label: MMC (UK); Relativity (US)
- Producer: Andy Davis; David Lord; Stuart Gordon

Clevedon Pier is the debut solo studio album by English musician Andy Davis. It received a UK release on the MMC label in 1989 and a US release by Relativity in 1991. The album was remastered and reissued by Angel Air Records in 2005 with two bonus tracks.

== Background ==
Clevedon Pier was made after Peter Van Hooke, the founder of the UK label MMC, asked Davis if he would like to record a solo album. In a 2005 interview, Davis recalled, "It's always nice when somebody asks you to make a solo album. I was asked to do it by Peter. He [had] a record company so I kind of jumped at the chance." The album was recorded at Crescent Studios and Moles Studios in Bath.

== Critical reception ==
Upon its release, Hi-Fi News & Record Review praised Clevedon Pier as a "soothing package from the multi-talented Davis" and "also a sonic delight". They added, "Try to imagine a stew of jazz, folk and pop and you're almost there." The Bristol Evening Post praised the "excellent" album for demonstrating Davis' "broad tastes" by being "tremendously varied, moving easily from classical to Celtic to acoustic and jazz influences". The reviewer concluded, "Clevedon Pier is a moody and expressive work of the New Age genre. Unlike so many of the technically perfect but sterile offerings from that form of music, Clevedon Pier is a rich and rewarding album." The Clevedon Mercury also considered it to "demonstrate Andy's rich inventiveness and diversity of style" and noted that "electronic orchestration blends smoothly with traditional hammer dulcimer, fiddle, mandolin and bass".

John Holt of the Nottingham Evening Post described it as "gentle new age-style stuff" where "traditional and unusual instruments blend on pieces that more often than not simply start, get louder then fade out". He picked "5 Saxes" as the album's best track, noting that the "multi-tracked brass belter" features Will Gregory. Tony Jasper of the Manchester Evening News remarked that it "illustrates well his broad musical tastes and multi-instrumental ability". In the US, Mike Gunderloy of Factsheet Five commented on the mix of "electronics and traditional instruments" and felt the results "range from traditional Celtic to modern swing" with instrumentals that "soar and whirl in an exciting fashion".

== Track listing ==
All tracks are written by Andy Davis except where noted

No.	Title	Writer(s)	Length
1.	"Women of Ireland"	Peadar Ó Doirnín, Seán Ó Riada, David Malony	3:25
2.	"Jabe"		6:53
3.	"5 Saxes"		4:31
4.	"Hunger"	Davis, Pete Brandt	4:52
5.	"Clevedon Pier"	Davis, David Lord	5:37
6.	"Basso Symphonie"		6:18
7.	"Over & Over"		5:38
8.	"Changes"	Davis, Lord	5:23
9.	"Prelude"	Pat Brennan	2:18
10.	"Clear Dawns"		4:49

2005 Angel Air reissue CD bonus tracks
No.	Title	Length
11.	"Magic"	5:40
12.	"Fred the Piano Man"	3:23

== Personnel ==
- Andy Davis – guitar (1, 2, 4, 5, 7, 9, 10), keyboards (1, 2, 4–8, 10), vocals (2, 4, 7)
- Stuart Gordon – violin (1, 2), hammer dulcimer (1), mandolin (5)
- Peter Allerhand – guitar (1)
- Will Gregory – saxophone (2, 3)
- David Lord – keyboards (5, 8, 10)
- Jam Crisp – percussion (6)

Production

- Andy Davis – producer (1–10)
- David Lord – producer (1–10), engineer (1, 5–7, 8, 10)
- Stuart Gordon – producer (1–10)
- Mike Long – engineer (2–4, 6, 9, 10)
- John Sheaffe – programming

Other

- Andrew Douglas, The Douglas Brothers – photography
- Bill Smith Studio – design
- Neville Farmer – liner notes
