= Nick Heath (producer) =

English music, television and film producer, publisher and designer

- Born: Nicholas Heath; 25 March 1949 (age 76); Wimbledon, London, England

Nicholas Heath (born 25 March 1949, in Wimbledon, London) is an English music producer, publisher, designer and film producer. He is a son of British big band leader Ted Heath.

== Music ==
Heath joined Robbins Music Corporation, the music publishing division of MGM, in the A&R department. He was initially responsible for managing the company's film soundtrack division, including: The Wizard of Oz, Singin' in the Rain, Kiss Me Kate, Seven Brides for Seven Brothers, Guys and Dolls, High Society, Cat on a Hot Tin Roof, Gigi, Ben-Hur, North by Northwest, How the West Was Won, Doctor Zhivago, 2001: A Space Odyssey, The Thomas Crown Affair, Shaft and Ken Russell's production of The Boy Friend with Twiggy and Timothy Buttons.

Establishing and leading a contemporary songwriting division for Robbins, and subsequently setting up EMI Music Publishing, Heath worked with John Sebastian, Tim Hardin, Peter Frampton, Rod Stewart, Soft Machine, Mickey Gallagher, John Turnbull, Alan Parsons, Roy Thomas Baker, David Paton, Billy Lyall and Ian Bairnson.

He formed the artiste management companies Firework and Heath Music Group, which signed the Scottish band Pilot who had worldwide chart success with "Magic" and "January"; and the Korgis who had success with "If I Had You" and "Everybody's Got to Learn Sometime".

Founding Rialto Records, an independent record label, and Heath Music Group, a music publishing and artist management company, he had further success with the Korgis, the Planets, the Regents and Mobiles. Rialto Art, under his art direction won numerous Design & Art Direction (D&AD) awards and nominations.

In 2013, he founded an independent record label, Birdland Records.

== Publishing ==
Heath founded The Rainbow Group of companies representing Walt Disney, Universal, Paramount, and Columbia Pictures which exclusively published book and audio editions of the film output from these studios, including Jungle Book, A-Team, and Ghostbusters. He produced the award-winning dramatized 'Theatre for Children' series of Roald Dahl books: Charlie and The Chocolate Factory, James and the Giant Peach, The BFG and Fantastic Mr. Fox.

== Television ==
With Nick Austin (Beggars Banquet Records) and Mike Appleton, he executive produced the Art of Landscape classical music series, providing Channel 4 with more than 200 hours of daytime music television programming. Art of Landscape was eventually broadcast for 6000 hours in 26 countries around the world.

== Film ==
Heath formed producer partnerships with Nora Ephron at Columbia Pictures, and Andrew Eaton and Michael Winterbottom at Polygram/Universal.

He executive produced the Toronto World of Comedy Film Festival selection The Most Unromantic Man in the World, which was written and directed by James Heath (his son) and Gratian Dimech.

In 2009, Heath formed the former US/UK based feature film and television production company, Birdland Film.

== Design ==
Founder of the Nick Heath Design Group, Heath has designed residential and commercial buildings and interiors in the UK and the US. One of his projects in London, The Piper Building, Fulham, was listed in 2010 as one of the 'Best Buildings in the City' as part of the annual Open House London event.
