= Don't Look Back (The Korgis song) =

1982 song by the Korgis

Single by the Korgis
- B-side: "Xenophobia"
- Released: 6 August 1982
- Length: 4:13
- Label: London Records
- Songwriter: James Warren
- Producer: Trevor Horn

The Korgis singles chronology
"Sticky George" (1981)	"Don't Look Back" (1982)	"True Life Confessions" (1985)

"Don't Look Back" is a song by British pop band the Korgis, released by London Records as a non-album single on 6 August 1982. The song was written by James Warren and was produced by Trevor Horn.

== Background ==
Warren originally wrote and demoed "Don't Look Back" without any definite plans on its future use. The demo ended up being passed by Warren's publishers, Warner Chappell Music, to producer Trevor Horn, who expressed interest in producing the song. Warner Chappell set up a meeting and a deal was agreed. In a 2015 interview with The Strange Brew, Warren recalled, "Trevor was the most inventive producer of that period and [Warner Chappell] thought he might be able to come up with something magical."

The song was recorded at Sarm Studios in London. Warren was later critical of himself when reflecting on the recording session, which he described in 2015 as "rather tense" with the "final result not very satisfactory". He told The Strange Brew, "I blame myself! I like the song but I sort of got in the way of the recording by constantly trying to recreate my original demo. I should have just let Trevor and Anne [Dudley] do their own thing with it. A pity. Not my finest moment." It was intended for Warren to work with Horn again on a follow-up single, "Endangered Species", but the plans never came to fruition.

== Release ==
"Don't Look Back" was released in the UK by London Records on 6 August 1982. With the production agreement with Horn in place, a deal for the song's release as a single was secured with London on the strength of the producer's involvement. The single failed to enter the UK Singles Chart, but did reach the unnumbered 'bubbling under' section for two consecutive weeks in September 1982, which would have been equivalent to a position between 76 and 100 at a time when the main charts covered the top 75.

Both "Don't Look Back" and its B-side, "Xenophobia", received their first CD release on the Korgis' 2003 compilation album Don't Look Back – The Very Best of The Korgis.

Despite its poor reception in the UK, the song was one of the most played on Brazilian radio stations in 1983, a commercial success driven mainly by the song's inclusion on the soundtrack of the telenovela Sol de Verão.

== Critical reception ==
Upon its release as a single, Radio Luxembourg DJ Rob Jones, writing for the Daily Mirror, stated, "I always hoped that the Korgis wouldn't be a one-hit wonder. Trevor Horn brings out the best in them with a beautiful production job." Mike Pryce of the Worcester Evening News praised it as a "delightful ballad, all dreamy and end of the dance stuff". He also noted the "nice twittering instrumental in the middle" and concluded that it was "just the thing for romantic summer nights". Simon Tebbutt of Record Mirror stated, "Smooth, subtle, sensitive and airey, it has the same effect on the senses as an overdose of horse tranquilliser." Paul Screeton of Hartlepool Mail called it "rather wimpish and bland" and "for incurable romantics only". Larry Juviski of The Northern Echo wrote, "Ruff stuff from group who haven't snapped since 'Everybody's Got to Learn Sometime'. If you think those puns are bad, you want to hear the words to this mushy ballad." Johnny Waller of Sounds stated, "No one has 'Don't Look Back' – despite being produced by the brilliant Trevor Horn – and I suspect matters will stay that way."

== Track listing ==
7–inch single

1. "Don't Look Back" – 4:13
2. "Xenophobia" – 2:28

== Personnel ==
"Don't Look Back"

- James Warren – vocals, bass
- Anne Dudley – keyboards
- Mel Collins – saxophone
- Manny Elias – drums

Production

- Trevor Horn – production ("Don't Look Back")
- James Warren – production ("Xenophobia")

Other

- Jamie Long – photography
