= Sticky George =

Studio album by The Korgis
- Released: 10 July 1981
- Recorded: December 1980 – February 1981
- Genre: Pop
- Length: 38:27 (CD 39:29)
- Label: Rialto Records (UK)
- Producer: James Warren; David Lord

The Korgis chronology
Dumb Waiters (1980)	Sticky George (1981)	The Best of The Korgis (1983)

Sticky George is the third studio album by English pop band, The Korgis, released on Rialto Records in the UK on 10 July 1981.

The album was named after a band that Korgis members Stuart Gordon and Phil Harrison had previously been in. The album includes the singles "That Was My Big Mistake", "All the Love in the World", "Don't Say That It's Over" and "Sticky George" - some were released as The Korgis and others under the name James Warren & The Korgis.

Sticky George was re-issued on CD by Edsel Records in 1999.

The album was followed by the non-album single "Don't Look Back" (produced by Trevor Horn)/"Xenophobia", released on London Records in June 1982. Both tracks are included on the 2003 compilation Don't Look Back - The Very Best of The Korgis.

== Background ==
Sticky George was recorded in the wake of the success of its predecessor, Dumb Waiters, and particularly the single "Everybody's Got to Learn Sometime", which gained international success. The Korgis recorded Sticky George after returning to England from a promotional tour in the United States. A number of tracks intended for the album had been written before the end of 1980. Korgis members Stuart Gordon and Phil Harrison wanted greater creative input on the album. As it came to completion, James Warren had disagreements with them, which resulted in both Gordon and Harrison leaving the band. Warren suffered a minor nervous breakdown during this period and later attributed it to the recording of the album and the general pressures of fame. One of those pressures was the expectation of Warren writing a suitable follow-up to "Everybody's Got to Learn Sometime" in the hope it would provide the band with another hit, particularly in America. He recalled in 2005, "It went to my head and I was ill-equipped at that time to deal with it very well. I became very kind of egocentric, I think. I didn't realise it at the time, but I think I had a bit of a nervous breakdown. There was a lot of pressure by the time we got in to record Sticky George. The whole thing became too much and I just didn't cope at all well. I think that was one of my worst phases."

== Critical reception ==
Professional ratings
Review scores
Source	Rating
AllMusic	3/5 stars

Upon its release, Record Business wrote, "Lush harmonies and quirky west country ideas are the trademarks of the Korgis, who can always be relied upon to make beautifully produced records. The carefully textured layers of guitar and synthesizer that underpin the saccharine sweet vocals of James Warren are well controlled, making sure the songs stay the right side of bland." Greg McMillan of the Canadian newspaper The Hamilton Spectator commented that the Korgis are "to pop music in the 80s what 10cc was to the 70s" whereby they "sit back and observe, then create billowy and layered pop songs". He added that the album is "no-frills electro-pop that is inoffensive and lacking in brashness" and "well-crafted alternative rock where any kind of flaw at all is hard to locate".

== Track listing ==
Side A:

1. "Sticky George" (Harrison, Warren) - 3:36
2. "Can't We Be Friends Now" (Warren) - 4:01
3. "Foolishness of Love" (Harrison) - 3:31
4. "Domestic Bliss" (Gordon, Harrison, Warren) - 3:15
5. "That Was My Big Mistake" (Davis, Warren) - 4:37

Side B:

1. "Nowhere to Run" (Davis, Warren) - 4:15
  - N.B. 1999 CD: Alternate version - 5:17. Original version available on compilations Archive Series and Greatest Hits.
2. "Contraband" (Warren) - 3:18
3. "All the Love in the World" (Davis, Warren) - 4:12
4. "Don't Say That It's Over" (Warren) - 2:50
5. "Living on the Rocks" (Warren) - 3:32

== Personnel ==
The Korgis

- James Warren - vocals, piano, bass guitar
- Stuart Gordon - guitar, banjo, violin, percussion, background vocals
- Phil Harrison - electric piano, keyboards, synthesizer, drums, spoons

Additional personnel

- David Lord - keyboards
- Manny Elias - drums
- Jerry Marotta - drums
- The Korgettes (Sheena Power & Jo Mullet) - backing vocals on tracks A5 and B5
- Steve Buck - flute on track B2
- Dave Pegler - clarinet on track B2
- Chantelle Samuel - bassoon on track B2
- Stephanie Nunn - oboe on track B2
- Huw Pegler - horn on track B2

Production

- James Warren - producer
- David Lord - producer, sound engineer, wind and strings arranger
- Nick Heath - direction
- Jeffrey Edwards - cover painting
- Peter Ashworth - photography
- Nick Heath, George Rowbottom - art direction
- Recorded December 1980 – February 1981, at Crescent Studios, Bath.

== Release history ==
- 1981 LP Rialto Records TENOR 103 (UK)
- 1999 CD Edsel Records EDCD 623

== Single releases ==
- "That Was My Big Mistake" (Edit) - 4:01 / "Can't We Be Friends Now" ('James Warren & The Korgis', Rialto TREB 134, April 1981)
- "All The Love In The World" (Edit) - 3:38 / "Intimate" (The Korgis, TREB 138, June 1981)
- "Don't Say That It's Over" (Single Version) - 2:47 / "Drawn And Quartered" (The Korgis/'James Warren & The Korgis', TREB 142, September 1981)
- "Sticky George" / "Nowhere To Run" ('James Warren & The Korgis', Rialto 101 470 France, 1981)

== Charts ==
Chart (1981)	Peak position
Swedish Albums (Sverigetopplistan)	32
