= Burning Questions (James Warren album) =

Studio album by James Warren
- Released: 2 February 1987
- Recorded: 1985–1986
- Genres: Pop, electropop
- Label: Sonet (UK)
- Producers: James Warren; Andy Davis

James Warren chronology
The Best of The Korgis (1983)	Burning Questions (1987)	The Best of & the Rest of The Korgis (1990)

Burning Questions is the debut solo studio album by English singer and composer James Warren, (of Stackridge and the Korgis fame). It was released on Sonet Records on 2 February 1987.

The album was recorded between January and October 1985 at Sonet Studio, London. It includes the singles "True Life Confessions" ('The Korgis', June 1985), "Burning Questions" (released as 'The Korgis', October 1985), "They Don't Believe In Magic" ('James Warren', July 1986) and "It Won't Be The Same Old Place" (James Warren, October 1986). None of the singles were a commercial success, but "True Life Confessions" received airplay on BBC Radio 2 and Independent Local Radio, and peaked at number 166 in the UK Singles Chart on 15 June 1985. "Burning Questions" also received airplay on BBC Radio 2 and I.L.R., but did not chart. The album itself received limited promotion by Sonet Records.

Nick Magnus contributed keyboards and percussion on the album. In a 2024 interview with Dmitry M. Epstein, Magnus recalled about his experience on recording it, "James [is] a great person to work with, he's phenomenal. All his vocals were pretty much the first take, and then he'd double-track himself and it would be perfect. I've never come across anybody who could do that so perfectly as James."

Burning Questions was re-issued on compact disc by Angel Air Records in 2007.

== Critical reception ==
Professional ratings
Review scores
Source	Rating
AllMusic	4.5/5 stars

In a retrospective review, Jo-Ann Greene of AllMusic described the album as "very much a child of its time", with Warren doing a "brilliant" job on the songs, which she noted "put even his past hits to shame". Greene noted that the album, containing Warren's "strongest songs to date", suffered from a lack of promotion and was "consigned to the dust heap of history".

== Track listing ==
Side A

1. "Burning Questions" (Andy Davis, James Warren) - 4:41
2. "Climate of Treason" (Warren) - 3:51
3. "They Don't Believe in Magic" (Warren) - 4:10
4. "Possessed" (Warren) - 4:11
5. "I Know Something" (Warren) - 3:10

Side B

1. "True Life Confessions" (Davis, Warren) - 4:17
2. "It Won't Be the Same Old Place" (Davis, Warren) - 4:59
3. "Loneliness" (Warren) - 4:10
4. "Can You Hear the Spirit Dying" (Warren) - 3:27
5. "I Want To Remember" (Warren) - 5:46

2007 CD bonus tracks

11. You Made Me Believe" (previously unreleased) (Warren) - 3:36
12. "How Did You Know?" (featuring Eddi Reader) (single 1987) (Warren, Matthios Siefert) - 3:46
13. "I'll Be Here" (B-side "They Don't Believe in Magic") (Warren) - 4:27

== Personnel ==
- James Warren – lead vocals, backing vocals, electric guitar, acoustic guitar, bass guitar
- Nick Magnus – keyboards, real and synthesized percussion, synthesizer programming
- Diesel – lead guitar ("Climate of Treason" and "Loneliness")
- Andy Davis – pre-production sequencing and backing vocals ("Burning Questions", "True Life Confessions" and "It Won't Be the Same Old Place"), lead guitar ("Can You Hear the Spirit Dying")
- Louise Tucker – operatic vocals ("Burning Questions")
- Debbie Doss – backing vocals ("Loneliness")

Production

- James Warren – production (all tracks)
- Andy Davis – production ("Burning Questions", "True Life Confessions" and "It Won't Be the Same Old Place")
- John Acock – engineering

Other

- Maggie Stewart – cover concept, art direction
- Hugh Elgar – photography
- Matt McArdle – artwork

2007 Angel Air Records reissue

- Glenn Tommey – overdubbed extra percussion and guitars, remastering
- James Warren – overdubbed extra percussion and guitars, remastering

== Release history ==
- 1987 Sonet Records, UK SNTF 956 (LP)
- 2007 Angel Air Records, UK SJPCD217, (CD)

== Single releases ==
Format: 7" unless otherwise noted.

- "True Life Confessions" / "Possessed" (Edit) - 3:55 (as 'The Korgis', Sonet SON 2277, June 1985)
- "True Life Confessions" (Extended) - 5:58 / "I Know Something" (Edit) - 2:53 / "Possessed" (Edit)- 3:48 (12") ('The Korgis', 12" SONL 2277, June 1985)
- "Burning Questions" / "Waiting For Godot" (non-album track) (Warren) - 3:34 ('The Korgis', SON 2284, 21 October 1985)
- "Burning Questions" (Extended) - 8:04 / "Waiting For Godot" ('The Korgis', 12" SONL 2284, 21 October 1985)
- "They Don't Believe in Magic" / "I'll Be Here" (non-album track) ('James Warren', SON 2302, 14 July 1986)
- "It Won't Be the Same Old Place" (Single remix by David Lord) - 4:23 / "Climate of Treason" (James Warren, SON 2311, 13 October 1986)
- "How Did You Know?" (non-album track) / "Can You Hear the Spirit Dying" (James Warren, SON 2328, 1987)
- "True Life Confessions" ('88 Remix by Kenny Denton) - 3:19 / "Possessed" (edit) - 3:55 ('The Korgis', SON 2277, March 1988)
