= Cantamus Girls Choir =

English choir

The Cantamus Girls Choir, based in Mansfield, Nottinghamshire, is an all female choir consisting of approximately forty young women between the ages of 13 and 19. The choir was founded in 1968 by its four founding members: Pamela Thompson as director, her husband Geoffrey Thompson as treasurer, Sheila Haslam as secretary and Sheila's husband Ivan who managed ticketing and CD Sales. Since its first public concert in 1968, over 400 girls have sang in the choir.

Michael Neaum was the accompanist between 1976 and 2006. Ann Irons joined as assistant director in 1976. Elaine Guy was a former member and became a Vocal Tutor in 1983. Joy Nicol became a Vocal Tutor from 1995 until her 2010 death. Philip Robinson was appointed an accompanist in 2006.

The Training Choir was added in 1992 accepting girls from aged 9 and shaping and training with many members graduate into the Senior Choir. The Cherubs were later added provide a nurturing programme for very young talent to begin their choral journey.

Cantamus has a history of international achievements, including winning 1st prize in Hungary in 1972 to double 1st prizes at Montreux in 1978. Their legacy includes the Grand Prix award at the Riva de Garda Festival in 1996, the "Choir of the World" title at Llangollen Eisteddfod in 1997, two Olympic Champions titles at the World Choir Games in 2004 and 2006, as well as claiming 1st place in the youth class at The North Wales Choir Festival 2022.

In December 2005, the choir recorded the EMI Album 'Cantamus' one track of which entered the UK Singles Chart with their cover version of "Everybody's Gotta Learn Sometime".

In July 2013 Pamela Cook died, and the baton was passed to Ann Irons with Elaine Guy as Assistant. Tributes from former students, associates and friends from all over the globe poured in, recognising her contribution to their lives and to choral music generally. She was due to receive an honorary degree from Nottingham University but died before it could be awarded. This would have added to all her other awards – MBE, Fellowships of both Birmingham Conservatoire and the Royal Academy of Music, and many others. On 22nd February 2015 she was commerated with a sculptured bust in foyer of the Mansfield Palace Theatre alongside a bust of composer and pianist, John Ogden. The unveiling was accompanied by a special concert to commerorate her featuring a specially commissioned choral work dedicated to her.

== Achievements ==
- 1971 – Montreux International Choral Competition – 2nd prize
- 1972 – Béla Bartók Contemporary Music Festival, Debrecen, Hungary – 1st prize
- 1972 – BBC Radio 3 "Let the People Sing" – Winners of British Round
- 1978 – Montreux International Choral Competition – Double 1st prize (Jury & Audience)
- 1979 – Międzyzdroje International Choral Festival, Poland – 1st prize
- 1980 – Llangollen Eisteddfod – 1st prize (Youth Class)
- 1982 – Vienna Youth and Music Festival – 1st prize (Female Choirs Class)
- 1982 – City of Vienna prize for most outstanding choir in the Festival
- 1986 – Montreux International Choral Festival – 1st prize (Audience)
- 1986 – BBC/Sainsbury's "Choir of the Year" competition – 1st prize (Adult Section)
- 1986–1990 – Performing Rights Society Awards every year for enterprise
- 1994 – BBC/Sainsbury's "Choir of the Year" competition – 1st prize (Youth Section)
- 1995 – International Choral Festival, Tolosa, Spain – 1st prize (Female Choirs)
- 1996 – Riva del Garda International Choral Competition – Grand Prix
- 1997 – Llangollen International Eisteddfod – Choir of the World
- 1998 – European Youth Music Festival, Neerpelt, Belgium – Summa cum Laude (Main Choir & Training Choir)
- 2002 – Arezzo International Choral Festival: 1st prize (Folk Song Class); 3rd prize (Polyphony Class); 3rd prize (Plainchant Class)
- 2004 – World Choir Olympics, Bremen, Germany: 2 Gold Medals (Equal Voices and Folk Song with Accompaniment Classes); Olympic Champions title
- 2006 – World Choir Olympics, Xiamen, China: 2 Gold Medals (Equal Voices and Folk Song with Accompaniment Classes); Most points awarded in Competition; Olympic Champions title
- 2009 – "Voyage of Songs" competition in Malaysia – first prizes in three classes plus the Grand Prix. Pamela Cook, director, won the Best Conductor Prize.
- 2010 – "Heart of Europe" competition held in Gelnausen, Germany: First prize in Sacred Music; second in Contemporary Music class.
- 2013 – 1st European World Games Choral Competition – first prizes in Sacred Music and Youth classes. Third prize in Folk Songs.
- 2013 – 1st European World Games competition in Graz, Austria – first prizes in Sacred Music and Youth classes; third prize in Folk Songs.

== Discography ==
- 2001 – Aurora – Warner Music 8573–87312–2
1. Aurora
2. Summer Song
3. Stay a While
4. El Viaje (The Journey)
5. Astalucia
6. Algun otro sitio (Somewhere Other)
7. Symphonie Lumiere
8. Beautiful Peace (Cudoviti Mir)
9. In My Dreams

(tracks 4-9 make up Spanish Suite)

- 2005 - Cantamus (EMI) 0946 3 41017 2 1
1. I Still Haven't Found What I'm Looking For
2. Fix You
3. Everybody's Gotta Learn Sometime
4. Universal Song
5. So Deep Is The Night
6. Bridge Over Troubled Water
7. Ave Maria
8. Soul Mining
9. The Rose
10. Over The Rainbow
11. Stay Another Day
12. Serenade
13. Allundé
