= Young 'n' Russian =

1979 song by the Korgis

Single by the Korgis

from the album The Korgis
- B-side: "Cold Tea"
- Released: 16 February 1979
- Length: 3:12
- Label: Rialto
- Songwriters: Andy Davis; James Warren; Jakki Ridlington
- Producers: Andy Davis; James Warren

The Korgis singles chronology
"Young 'n' Russian" (1979)	"If I Had You" (1979)

"Young 'n' Russian" is a song by British pop band the Korgis from their self-titled debut studio album. It was released as the band's debut single in February 1979 and, following the UK top 20 success of "If I Had You", was re-issued as a single again in October 1979. The song was written by Andy Davis, James Warren, and Jakki Ridlington, and was produced by Davis and Warren.

== Background ==
"Young 'n' Russian" was inspired by the Cold War. The song was written while sitting on the lawn in front of the Royal Crescent in Bath, England. The Korgis (Andy Davis and James Warren) co-wrote the song with one of Davis's friends, Jakki Ridlington. Warren recalled to The Strange Brew Podcast in 2025 that the song was "an unusual, experimental track [with] good lyrics" and was "quite different to the more melodic stuff we did afterwards".

== Release ==
"Young 'n' Russian" was released in the UK on 16 February 1979, but it failed to chart. It was the first release on the new independent label Rialto, which was launched by Nick and Tim Heath. Speaking of the song's limited success, James Warren told the Liverpool Echo in 1979, "Our first single never got any real airplay, so, consequently, nobody has ever heard of it, which is a pity really, because I'm convinced it's a good song."

Following the UK top 20 success of "If I Had You" in the summer of 1979, "Young 'n' Russian" was reissued in October 1979. It once again failed to enter the UK Singles Chart, but did gain radio airplay and reached number 59 on Record Business magazine's Airplay Guide Top 100 chart. The reissue's release date was originally delayed after Rialto decided to terminate its licensing agreement with Decca Records. A new deal for pressing and distribution with quickly signed with Pye Records and "Young 'n' Russian" was released as the first Rialto single under the new agreement.

== Music video ==
The song's music video was directed by Dave Borthwick and David Hutt, with Dave Alex Riddett as the cinematographer. It was filmed in Bristol. In 2015, Hutt uploaded the video to YouTube after digitising and remastering it from the original master film.

== Critical reception ==
Upon its release in February 1979, Radio & Record News called "Young 'n' Russian" a "brilliant debut single" and a "highly infectious and witty song". The reviewer noted the "equally good" B-side and felt that the single "could well see [itself] in the top 30". In a review of the October 1979 reissue, David Hepworth of Smash Hits stated, "It's midnight in Red Square, an organ is stuck on one continuous chord, a lively bass skips around and the singer has tongue stuck firmly in cheek." He added that "if there's any justice, it will surpass the success" of its predecessor, "If I Had You". Paul Screeton of the Hartlepool Mail believed the single was a "likely chart follow-up now they're known" and wrote, "Strange sound throughout and something really different. Good idea, strong hook, and an air of mystery and menace."

Mike Pryce of the Worcester Evening News called it a "deep throated track" that is "much different" to "If I Had You". He added, "Owes a lot to a well recorded bass line but generally it's a bit downbeat for my liking. Sounds like they needed stirring up a bit." Jim Whiteford of The Kilmarnock Standard remarked, "Not a patch on 'If I Had You' but a fair attempt. Next time, perhaps!" US magazine Record World noted that "the quirky tempo and menacing vocals bespeak an ominous aura that's affecting as it is odd".

== Sample ==
In 2008, "Young 'n' Russian" was sampled by American hip-hop duo Atmosphere for their song "You" from their fifth studio album, When Life Gives You Lemons, You Paint That Shit Gold.

== Track listing ==
7–inch single (UK, Germany, Belgium and Australia - original release)

1. "Young 'n' Russian" – 3:12
2. "Cold Tea" – 4:25

7–inch single (UK and Australia reissues, plus Netherlands, Italy and Spain releases)

1. "Young 'n' Russian" – 3:12
2. "Mount Everest Sings the Blues" – 2:28

7–inch single (France)

1. "Young 'n' Russian" – 3:35
2. "I Just Can't Help It" – 3:48

7–inch single (US)

1. "Young 'n' Russian" – 3:14
2. "Art School Annexe" – 3:34

== Personnel ==
Production

- Andy Davis – production
- James Warren – production

== Charts ==
Chart (1982)	Peak position
UK Airplay Guide Top 100 (Record Business)	59
