= Jeffery Edwards =

British artist

Jeffery Edwards is a British artist who was born in London in 1945.

Edwards studied at Leeds College of Art (1964–67) and then at the Royal College of Art (1967–70), where he was awarded a Printmaking Prize.

Edwards' most significant artistic output has been in making prints, where he typically 'adopts a bland, comic‐book style for his eerie domestic dramas'.

He has participated in several international exhibitions, including the Venice Biennale in 1972, the Ljubljana Biennale of Graphic Arts in 1973, and 'New British Printmakers' at the Brooklyn Museum in 1974, among others. Edwards has also taken up teaching positions in printmaking at various art colleges, including the Royal College of Art and The Slade School of Fine Art, and has also lectured at the Chelsea College of Arts.
