= Kilmarnock Standard =

- Type: Weekly newspaper
- City: Kilmarnock, Scotland
- Circulation: 1,533 (as of 2023)
- Website: kilmarnockstandard.co.uk

The Kilmarnock Standard is a Scottish weekly newspaper published every Wednesday in the town of Kilmarnock.
