= Dumb Waiters =

Studio album by The Korgis
- Released: 7 July 1980
- Recorded: October 1979 – March 1980
- Genre: Pop; new wave; synthpop
- Length: 34:33
- Label: Rialto Records (UK); Asylum Records (U.S.)
- Producer: The Korgis, David Lord

The Korgis chronology
The Korgis (1979)	Dumb Waiters (1980)	Sticky George (1981)

Dumb Waiters is the second studio album by English New wave music pop fusion band the Korgis. It was released on Rialto Records in the UK in 1980.

The album peaked #40 at UK chart and includes the singles "Everybody's Got to Learn Sometime", UK #5, US #18, Australia #18; "If It's Alright with You Baby" UK #56; "Dumb Waiters" and "Rover's Return".

Dumb Waiters was re-issued on CD by Edsel Records in 1999.

== Background ==
Following the release of their self-titled debut album in 1979, the Korgis quickly began working on their second album with producer David Lord. Their debut album had been recorded in Lord's Crescent Studios, which the producer established in his top-floor flat in Camden Crescent, Bath. By the time the Korgis came to record Dumb Waiters, Lord had moved Crescent Studios into a house in Walcot Street and provided it with superior recording equipment, including a new recording console and a 24-track tape machine.

Originally a duo with James Warren and Andy Davis, the Korgis became a four-piece line-up with the joining of Bath-based musicians Phil Harrison and Stuart Gordon, who had both contributed to the Korgis's debut album. Dumb Waiters took about five months to record. During its recording, Peter Gabriel allowed the Korgis to use his Fairlight CMI; Gabriel being the first owner of a Fairlight Series I in the UK.

As the album neared completion, Davis departed the band to pursue other musical ventures; he went on to join Slow Twitch Fibres. Davis later admitted that he always had a tendency to get bored easily and, at the time, the band's early success left no challenge for him. He also found the recording of Dumb Waiters to be very methodological and lacking in spontaneity. Warren recollected that Davis disliked the "smooth" direction that the Korgis were taking, with less of a rock edge and Warren's insistence on things like three-part harmonies. As Davis had provided the lead vocals on half of the tracks, Warren returned to the studio to replace them with his own vocals. In a 2025 interview with Record Collector, Warren expressed regret that he did not re-record half of the album and replace a couple of tracks, particularly as the backing tracks to those originally sung by Davis were not changed and their key was too low for Warren.

Speaking of the album, Warren told Melody Maker in 1980, "Essentially the album [is] a continuation of the first, in that we still wanted to try and write good three minute songs, and also to be quite meticulous in the recording of [them]."

== Critical reception ==
Professional ratings
Review scores
Source	Rating
AllMusic	2/5 stars
Record Mirror	3.5/5 stars
Smash Hits	7½/10

Upon its release, Simon Ludgate of Record Mirror described Dumb Waiters as being full of "wistful, romantic pop songs" and concluded, "Although definitely a case of filing under 'easy listening', this album is of sound body and mind." Ian Cranna of Smash Hits noted that "skilful borrowing" of "elements as varied as the Regents, old film songs, disco and electronics" have been "blended into this simple, very tuneful and very appealing album". He continued, "Add a bright, modernised feel, the distinctive soft shoe vocal delivery behind that massive string synthesiser, some quirky humour plus a large, unabashed streak and you get the Korgis' intelligent candyfloss for sentimental types." James Belsey of the Bristol Evening Post called it a "delicious album". He picked the "near-Giorgio Moroder" "Drawn and Quartered" as "particularly strong" and described "Everybody's Got to Learn Sometime" as "beautiful".

Peter Trollope of the Liverpool Echo gave the album "ten out of ten for effort" and commented that the Korgis had successfully produced "an album of singles" to match the standard of "Everybody's Got to Learn Sometime". He wrote, "Some of the songs, like the new single, are superb, while others almost reach perfection. The lyrics are, sometimes, a bit too twee and tacky, while at other times, they are just right. Even if you don't like the Korgis, you'll find it hard not to like Dumb Waiters." Paul Screeton of the Hartlepool Mail called it a "good pop album with thought behind it and commerciality oozing from it". He continued, "The Korgis have a knack for musical subtlety and understatement and a craftsmanlike approach to songwriting." Jim Whiteford of the Kilmarnock Standard considered it a "worthwhile follow-up" to the band's debut album and noted their "sweet melodic approach".

Aberdeen's Press and Journal praised "Everybody's Got to Learn Sometime", but believed some of the other tracks "sound a little overproduced and too 'busy'", with the Korgis "sound[ing] best with a fairly sparse backing". Peter Kinghorn of Newcastle's The Journal commented that "inevitable comparisons with [their] excellent debut album produce disappointment". He stated, "Slow numbers have meandering melodies, like 'Everybody's Got to Learn Sometime' whose success astounded me, while more uptempo songs lack meat."

== Track listing ==
Side A
No.	Title	Writer(s)	Length
1.	"Silent Running"	Warren	3:05
2.	"Love Ain't Too Far Away"	Davis	3:29
3.	"Perfect Hostess"	Davis	3:21
4.	"Drawn and Quartered"	Warren	3:20
5.	"Everybody's Got to Learn Sometime" (1999 CD edition includes alternate version)	Warren	4:24

Side B
No.	Title	Writer(s)	Length
6.	"Intimate"	Davis	3:08
7.	"It's No Good Unless You Love Me"	Warren	3:24
8.	"Dumb Waiters"	Warren	2:42
9.	"If It's Alright with You Baby"	Warren	4:06
10.	"Rover's Return"	Davis	3:34

== Charts ==
Chart (1980)	Peak position
Australia (Kent Music Report)	72
Dutch Albums (Album Top 100)	48
Swedish Albums (Sverigetopplistan)	32
UK Albums (OCC)	40

== Personnel ==
- James Warren - lead vocals, background vocals, bass guitar, electric guitar, keyboards
- Stuart Gordon - acoustic guitar, violin
- Andy Davis - electric guitar, keyboards, drums, percussion, background vocals
- Phil Harrison - keyboards, percussion

=== Additional personnel ===
- David Lord - percussion
- Stephen Paine - programming
- Jo Mullet - background vocals
- Ali Cohn - background vocals

== Production ==
- The Korgis - producers
- David Lord - producer, sound engineer
- Nick Heath - direction
- Tim Heath - direction
- Jeffery Edwards - cover painting
- Tim Simmons - photography
- Nick Heath, George Rowbottom - art direction
- Julian Balme - art direction
- Recorded at Crescent Studios, Bath, Somerset, England from October 1979 to March 1980.

== Release history ==
- 1980 LP Rialto Records TENOR 104 (UK)
- 1980 LP Asylum Records 290 (US)
- 1999 CD Edsel Records EDCD 622

== Single releases ==
Format: 7" unless otherwise noted

- "Everybody's Got to Learn Sometime" / "Dirty Postcards" (Rialto TREB 115, April 1980)
- "If It's Alright with You Baby" / "Love Ain't Too Far Away" (TREB 118, July 1980)
- "If It's Alright with You Baby" (Remix) - 3:46 / "Love Ain't Too Far Away" (12" TREBL 118, July 1980)
- "Dumb Waiters" / "Perfect Hostess" (TREB 122, October 1980)
- "Rovers Return" / "Wish You a Merry Christmas" (non-album track) (Warren/Harrison) - 2:53 (TREB 131, 28 November 1980)
