= Camden Crescent, Bath =

Camden Crescent
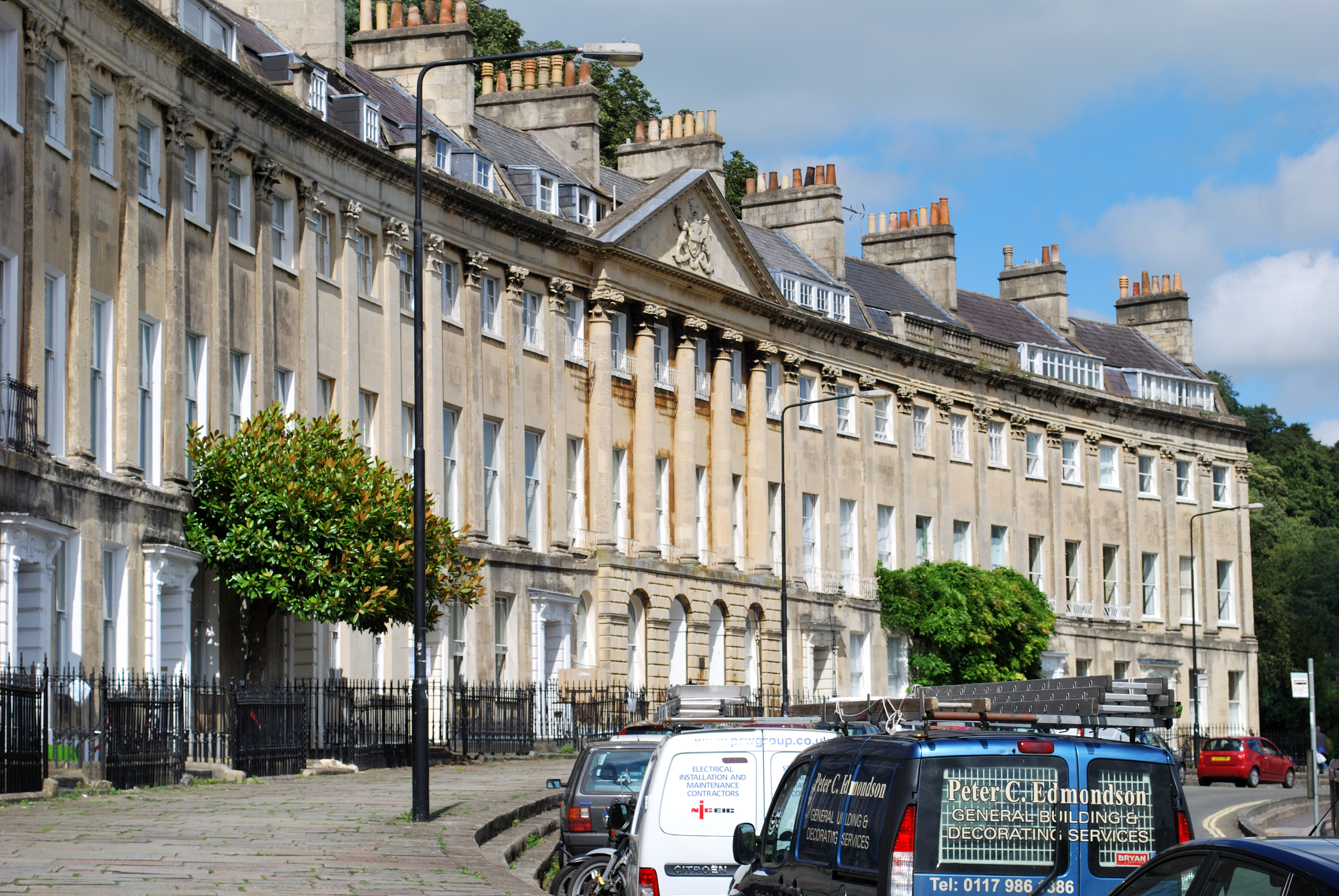

- Location within Somerset
- 51°23′25″N 2°21′41″W
- Location: Bath, Somerset, England

History
- Built: 1788

Site notes
- Architect: John Eveleigh

Listed Building – Grade I
- Official name: Nos. 6-21 and attached railings and vaults
- Designated: 12 June 1950
- Reference no.: 1395191

Listed Building – Grade II
- Official name: No.1 and attached railings and vaults
- Designated: 12 June 1950
- Reference no.: 1395176

Listed Building – Grade II
- Official name: No.2 and attached railings and vaults
- Designated: 12 June 1950
- Reference no.: 1395178

Listed Building – Grade II
- Official name: No.3 and attached railings and vaults
- Designated: 12 June 1950
- Reference no.: 1395185

Listed Building – Grade II
- Official name: No.4 and attached railings and vaults
- Designated: 12 June 1950
- Reference no.: 1395188

Listed Building – Grade II
- Official name: No.5 and attached railings and vaults
- Designated: 12 June 1950
- Reference no.: 1395190

Listed Building – Grade II
- Official name: The Lodge and attached wall, lamp and railings
- Designated: 5 August 1975
- Reference no.: 1395205

Camden Crescent in Bath, Somerset, England, was built by John Eveleigh in 1788; it was originally known as Upper Camden Place. Numbers 6 to 21 have been designated as a Grade I listed buildings. The other houses are Grade II listed.

The houses are of three storeys, with attics and basements. At the southern end of the crescent the basements are at ground level because of the contours of the land. The east end of the crescent was not completed and was abandoned after a landslide, with the exception of the end house, which was demolished in 1828. This means that the two paired doors of numbers 16 and 17, which stand beneath a pediment supported by five Corinthian columns at what would have been the centre of the crescent, do not form its middle. The arms of Charles Pratt, 1st Earl Camden, after whom the crescent was named, are on the doorway keystones along with an elephant's head which was his symbol.

In July 1951 Number 1 Camden Crescent was the scene of an abduction when John Straffen took five-year-old Brenda Goddard and later killed her.

In Jane Austen's Persuasion (1818), the Elliot family rent lodgings on Camden Place, as the Crescent was then known. In Georgette Heyer's Lady of Quality (1972), which is set in Regency era Bath, her heroine Annis Wychwood owns one of the houses there.

== See also ==
- Grade I listed buildings in Bath and North East Somerset
