= The Korgis (album) =

Studio album by The Korgis
- Released: 7 July 1979
- Recorded: 1978–1979
- Genre: Pop; new wave
- Length: 35:20
- Label: Rialto Records (UK); Warner Bros. Records (U.S.)
- Producer: The Korgis

The Korgis chronology
| The Korgis (1979) | Dumb Waiters (1980) |

The Korgis is the debut studio album by English pop band, the Korgis. It was released in 1979 on Rialto Records in the UK, and on Warner Bros. Records in the US.

The album includes the singles "Young 'n' Russian" and "If I Had You" (#13, UK Singles Chart), the latter being notable for the keyboard contributions of Alan Wilder, who in 1982 would join Depeche Mode for thirteen years.

The Korgis was re-issued on compact disc by Edsel Records in 1999.

== Background ==
James Warren and Andy Davis formed the Korgis in 1978, when Warren sent Davis a demo tape of his own songs, along with a note inviting Davis to Bath so that they could work together in the recording studio. The duo wrote a number of songs while sitting on the lawn in front of the Royal Crescent and began recording demos at Crescent Studios, which David Lord established in his top-floor flat in Camden Crescent.

The duo subsequently decided to record their eponymous debut album there rather than in a professional studio in London as it was significantly cheaper and allowed the duo more studio time to record. They were assisted by a number of musicians, including future Korgis members Stuart Gordon (violin, mandolin, percussion) and Phil Harrison (keyboards, percussion). The album took approximately five months to complete. All of the songs on the album were either written outside the Royal Crescent or in the studio, except "Dirty Postcards" and "If I Had You", which were written before the duo formed the Korgis.

== Critical reception ==
Professional ratings
Review scores
| Source | Rating |
|---|---|
| AllMusic | 4/5 stars |
| Smash Hits | 6½/10 |

Upon its release, James Belsey of the Bristol Evening Post called The Korgis a "truly attractive debut album of perfectionist pop", with "unmistakable influences from John Lennon" and a "string of witty, mature tracks". Steve Richards of the Grimsby Evening Telegraph commented that Warren and Davis had "maintained all their class, feel for freshness and humour" from their Stackridge days and produced "one very charming album [of] 10 songs, each [with] its own distinct qualities". He added, "I love the simplistic feel of the whole affair and the way it all slots so perfectly together. A very, very welcome release."

Ray King of the Manchester Evening News noted that Warren and Davis are "barking up the right tree at last" as the Korgis and added that the ten tracks on the album "comprise out and out pop melodies, with witty, amusing and always inventive lyrics". Red Starr of Smash Hits found the "odd collection" to be "more interesting and adventurous than 'If I Had You' ever lets on" and continued, "Lightweight and melodic, the Korgis are by turns strange, humourous [sic], clever and romantic, with a generous touch of the legendary Stackridge looniness. Not everything works but mostly very likeable, entertaining stuff."

== Track listing ==
Side A:

1. "Young 'n' Russian" (Davis, Jakki Ridlington, Warren) - 3:12
2. "I Just Can't Help It" (Davis) - 3:43
3. "Chinese Girl" (Davis) - 2:19
4. "Art School Annexe" (Davis) - 3:37
5. "Boots and Shoes" (Davis, Warren) - 4:32

Side B:

1. "Dirty Postcards" (Warren) - 4:45
2. "O Maxine" (Warren) - 2:39
3. "Mount Everest Sings the Blues" (Warren) - 2:32
4. "Cold Tea" (Warren) - 4:26
5. "If I Had You" (Davis, Sergei Rachmaninoff) - 3:55
  - Album version

== Personnel ==
- James Warren - vocals, bass guitar
- Andy Davis - vocals, drums, keyboards, mandolin
- Stuart Gordon - violin, mandolin, percussion
- Phil Harrison - keyboards, percussion
- Bill Birks - drums, percussion

Additional personnel

- Alan Wilder - backing vocals, keyboards
- Glenn Tommey - keyboards
- David Lord - keyboards
- Al Powell - drums
- Kenny Lacey - percussion
- Keith Warmington - harmonica
- Jo Mullet - backing vocals
- Jo Pomeroy - backing vocals

== Production ==
- The Korgis - producers
- David Lord - sound engineer
- Glenn Tommey - assistant engineer
- George Rowbottom - art direction
- Julian Balme - art direction
- Martyn Goddard - photography
- Heath Bros. - management
- Recorded at Crescent Studios, Bath, Somerset 1977 (track B5), 1978 (tracks A1-A4, B2 & B3) & 1979 (tracks A5, B1 & B4).

== Release history ==
- 1979 LP Rialto Records TENOR 101 (UK)
- 1979 LP Warner Bros. Records 3349 (US)
- 1999 CD Edsel Records EDCD 621

== Single releases ==
- "Young 'n' Russian" / "Cold Tea" (Rialto TREB 101, February 1979)
- "If I Had You" (Single Version) / "Chinese Girl" (TREB 103, May 1979) UK #13
- "Young 'n' Russian" / "Mount Everest Sings the Blues" (re-issue, TREB 108, October 1979)
- "I Just Can't Help It (Remix)" / "O Maxine" (TREB 112, January 1980)

== Charts ==
| Chart (1979) | Peak position |
|---|---|
| Swedish Albums (Sverigetopplistan) | 36 |
