= I Just Can't Help It =

1979 song by the Korgis

Single by the Korgis

from the album The Korgis
- B-side: "O Maxine"
- Released: January 1980
- Length: 3:50
- Label: Rialto
- Songwriter(s): Andy Davis
- Producer(s): Andy Davis; James Warren

The Korgis singles chronology
"Young 'n' Russian" (1979)	"I Just Can't Help It" (1980)	"Everybody's Got to Learn Sometime" (1980)

"I Just Can't Help It" is a song by English pop band the Korgis, released by Rialto Records in January 1980 as the third single from their debut studio album, The Korgis (1979). The song was written by Andy Davis, and was produced by Davis and James Warren.

== Release ==
Following the top 20 success of "If I Had You" in the summer of 1979, the Korgis re-issued their debut single, "Young 'n' Russian", in October 1979, but it failed to chart. The third song and final song to be lifted as a single from the band's debut album was "I Just Can't Help It" in January 1980. Although it also failed to enter the UK singles chart, it did receive airplay on UK radio. It achieved limited airplay on BBC Radio 1, but was more successful on various Independent Local Radio stations, including Clyde, Trent FM (A-listed), Capital London (A-listed), City, Forth (B-listed), Radio Luxembourg (C-listed), Manx (A-listed), Metro, Orwell, Pennine, Plymouth Sound (A-listed) and Victory (A-listed). In early February 1980, "I Just Can't Help It" peaked at number 53 on Record Business magazine's Airplay Guide Top 100 chart.

== Critical reception ==
Upon its release as a single, Peter Trollope of the Liverpool Echo remarked that the Korgis had followed-up "If I Had You" with "another perfect pop single" featuring "some great harmonies, swirling keyboards and nice guitar lines, which add up to a winning formula and should be a big hit for them". Paul Screeton of the Hartlepool Mail commented, "They go for safe territory again and should have a small hit. Pleasant love song with a streamlined arrangement and unashamedly calculating vocal harmonies." Mike Burke, writing for the Durham Chronicle, noted how the band "stick to exactly the same formula in their attempt to follow the success" of "If I Had You". He concluded, "The summery, pop rock feeling is just as appealing in this one and I can see it making it."

Julie Milton of Smash Hits also felt that the song was "another" "If I Had You". She continued, "Gooey, sweet – makes me wanna brush my teeth just listening to it. If you buy the single, add a toothbrush and a tube of Macleans to your shopping list." Tony Jasper of Music Week was critical, writing, "Remorseless ramming home of title line, little else. Orchestration in mould of their 'If I Had You' hit. Somewhat amusing but colour jaded bag. Will struggle."

== Track listing ==
7–inch single (UK, Netherlands and Germany)

1. "I Just Can't Help It" – 3:50
2. "O Maxine" – 2:38

== Personnel ==
Production

- Andy Davis – production
- James Warren – production

== Charts ==
Chart (1980)	Peak position
UK Airplay Guide Top 100 (Record Business)	53
