= If I Had You (The Korgis song) =

1979 song by the Korgis

Single by the Korgis

from the album The Korgis
- B-side: "Chinese Girl"; "Art School Annexe"
- Released: 18 May 1979
- Length: 3:55
- Label: Rialto
- Songwriter: Andy Davis
- Producer: The Korgis

The Korgis singles chronology
"Young 'n' Russian" (1979)	"If I Had You" (1979)	"I Just Can't Help It" (1980)

"If I Had You" is a song by British pop band the Korgis, released on 18 May 1979 as the second single from their debut studio album, The Korgis (1979). The song was written by Andy Davis and was produced by the Korgis. It gave the band their commercial breakthrough, peaking at number 13 in the UK Singles Chart and remaining in the top 75 for 12 weeks.

== Writing ==
"If I Had You" was written by Andy Davis some years before it was recorded by the Korgis, at a time when he was "enthralled by Phil Spector". Davis based the song's melody on Variation 18 of Sergei Rachmaninoff's 1934 concertante work Rhapsody on a Theme of Paganini. He originally demoed the song in London with the help of Peter Van Hooke and Mo Foster, calling it a "white reggae sort of thing" and "offbeat".

== Recording ==
The song was recorded at Crescent Studios in Bath, which was based in David Lord's top-floor flat in Camden Crescent. Warren revealed to the Liverpool Echo in 1979, "It was a bit weird, I suppose. I mean we were all over the house. I did the vocals for 'If I Had You' on the landing." The band opted to record there rather than in a professional studio in London as it was significantly cheaper and allowed the duo more studio time to record their debut album. The band found the song's mixing process to be a "nightmare" and numerous mixes were produced over the course of several months.

Speaking of the song, Warren said in 1979, "I think the song is a great radio song, as opposed to something you might just sit down and listen to. It is pop and that really is what radio stations should be about. I don't think the lyrics have any great significance – they're just good pop ones. Actually, I find it nice to have a vast symphonic sound behind my voice." In 2005, Davis recalled that when the song came to be recorded by the Korgis, they had decided to give it the "'My Sweet Lord' treatment".

== Promotion ==
The duo performed the song twice on Top of the Pops.

== Critical reception ==
Upon its release as a single, James Belsey of the Bristol Evening Post picked "If I Had You" as the newspaper's "single of the week" and called it a "lovely piece of warm, summery pop" with which the duo "deserve an easy hit... if they get the airplay". Jim Whiteford of The Kilmarnock Standard noted the "sweet and sticky summer melody which smacks of John Lennon's '#9 Dream'" and believed it "should sell in similar quantities and go barking up the chart tree".

== Track listing ==
7–inch single

1. "If I Had You" – 3:55
2. "Chinese Girl" – 2:15
3. "Art School Annexe" – 3:35

7–inch single (US)

1. "If I Had You" – 3:55
2. "Chinese Girl" – 2:15

== Personnel ==
Production

- Andy Davis – production
- James Warren – production
- David Lord – engineering

== Charts ==
Chart (1979)	Peak position
UK Singles (OCC)	13
