= If It's Alright with You Baby =

1980 song by the Korgis

Single by the Korgis

from the album Dumb Waiters
- B-side: "Love Ain't Too Far Away"
- Released: 1 August 1980
- Length: 3:40
- Label: Rialto
- Songwriter(s): James Warren
- Producer(s): The Korgis

The Korgis singles chronology
"Everybody's Got to Learn Sometime" (1980)	"If It's Alright with You Baby" (1980)	"Dumb Waiters" (1980)

"If It's Alright with You Baby" is a song by British pop band the Korgis, released on 1 August 1980 as the second single from their second studio album, Dumb Waiters. The song was written by James Warren and was produced by the Korgis. As the follow-up to their UK top 5 hit "Everybody's Got to Learn Sometime", "If It's Alright with You Baby" reached number 56 in the UK Singles Chart and remained in the top 75 for three weeks.

== Background ==
Speaking to UKRADIO in 2019, James Warren recalled of the song, "It was one of those 'throw everything at it', sort of kitchen sink-type productions. Apart from absolutely loving the Beatles, the other thing we used to like when we first started doing the Korgis was classic 60s pop, the Phil Spector kind of thing: big productions, kitchen sink, everything thrown in. So I think it was one of our attempts at doing one of those, where the song is just huge right from the beginning and it's like a wall of sound. When I hear it now, I wish we could have used a real string section rather than synthesiser strings because to me that would've really made the sound we were looking for."

For its release as a single, the album version of the song was remixed.

== Critical reception ==
Upon its release as a single, Mike Nicholls of Record Mirror stated that "no high production gloss can submerge the sweetness of this achingly romantic ballad". He added, "[It] ain't gonna lose the Korgis the tag of thinking men's 'New Musik' or somesuch but is still a very worthy, very memorable slice of schmaltz. Eeh, ah've seen grown men turn t'jelly in t' face of choons like this." Anne Nightingale, writing for the Daily Express, believed it would provide the Korgis with another hit. She wrote, "Their soft, pretty sound goes against every current trend, but their musical style and harmony put the group in a niche of their own." Peter Trollope of the Liverpool Echo noted that "once again it's another immaculate production, but it lacks that certain something you need for a top ten hit". He predicted it would "find a way into the lower half of the top thirty". Paul Du Noyer of the NME remarked that the Korgis' "bespectacled wimp of a singer must be the oldest lovesick adolescent in the business", but added, "Nevertheless, this song has all the aching, string-laden appeal of its lush predecessors and I must admit that it brings out the lovesick little wimp in this listener quite efficiently. God, how embarrassing."

== Track listing ==
7–inch single

1. "If It's Alright with You Baby" – 3:40
2. "Love Ain't Too Far Away" – 3:15

== Personnel ==
Production

- The Korgis – production

== Charts ==
Chart (1980)	Peak position
Netherlands (Dutch Top 40)	33
Netherlands (Single Top 100)	39
UK Singles (OCC)	56
