= David Lord (producer) =

English composer and record producer

- Born: 1944 (age 81–82); Oxford
- Education: Royal Academy of Music
- Occupations: Record producer, composer, music arranger
- Website: www.dlord.co.uk

David Lord (born 1944) is an English composer and record producer, known for his work with Peter Gabriel, the Korgis and XTC.

== Career ==
Lord was born in 1944 in Oxford, England and educated at the Royal Academy of Music, under Richard Rodney Bennett. He worked as a producer for BBC Radio early in his career.

He worked as a composer; his song‐cycle, The Wife of Winter, was written in 1968, for Janet Baker while The History of the Flood (1969) has a libretto by John Heath-Stubbs. His 'cantata for children', "The Sea Journey", with a libretto by Michael Dennis Browne, is known to exist in two private pressings: one from the 1969 Farnham Festival, for which it was commissioned; the other recorded in 1982 by children from St. Catherine's British Embassy School, Athens, Greece. He also wrote a piece for Julian Bream and a test piece for a London Symphony Orchestra conductors' competition.

In 1981, Lord produced "Suffer the Children", the first single by Tears for Fears. He is responsible for the string arrangements on the chart hits "Everybody's Got to Learn Sometime" by the Korgis, and "I'll Stand by You" by the Pretenders. He played a Prophet 5 synthesiser on one track, "Just Good Friends", on the 1983 Peter Hammill album Patience, for which he was also recording engineer.

Since around 1970, Lord has lived in Bath, where he formerly operated Crescent Studios, initially in his top-floor flat in Camden Crescent, and subsequently in a building dating from around 1700, at 144 Walcot Street. He closed the studio when a new road was built next to it.

Lord has appeared on The South Bank Show, discussing his work producing Peter Gabriel's fourth, eponymously titled solo album.

== Conviction ==
In 2015, Lord was convicted of keeping a brothel after admitting making bookings and taking money for sex workers operating from his home. Noting there was no coercion involved, he was given a suspended prison sentence, made subject to a 7pm to 7am curfew for four months, and made to wear an electronic tag by Judge Geoffrey Mercer QC, at Bristol Crown Court.

== Discography ==
Albums produced or co-produced by Lord include:

- The Korgis – Dumb Waiters (1980)
- The Korgis – Sticky George (1981)
- Peter Gabriel – Peter Gabriel (1982)
- Roy Harper – Work of Heart (1982)
- The Icicle Works – The Icicle Works (1984)
- XTC – The Big Express (1984)
- Jean Michel Jarre - Zoolook ( 1984)
- Peter Blegvad - Knights Like This (1985)
- M + M – The World Is a Ball (1986)
- How We Live - Dry Land (1985)
- Icehouse – Measure for Measure (1986)
- Icehouse – Man of Colours (1987)
- Andy Davis – Clevedon Pier (1989)
- Peter Hammill – Fireships (1992)
- David Ferguson – The View from Now (1998)
