= Hats Off (Roy Harper album) =

Compilation album by Roy Harper
- Released: 2001
- Recorded: England
- Genre: Rock
- Length: 71:54
- Label: Capitol / The Right Stuff 72435-27640-2-0
- Producer: Roy Harper

Roy Harper chronology
Song Of The Ages (1997)	Hats Off (2001)	East Of The Sun (2001)

Professional ratings
Review scores
Source	Rating
Allmusic	link

Hats Off is a 2001 compilation album by Roy Harper featuring 14 of Harper's own songs "...accompanied by some of rock's most legendary performers." (From rear album cover).

== History ==
The album spans 28 years of Harper's recorded output and features a number of guest musicians, including Jimmy Page, David Bedford, Keith Moon, Ronnie Lane, David Gilmour and Kate Bush.

The album's title refers to the tributary song "Hats Off to (Roy) Harper" by Led Zeppelin from their third album, Led Zeppelin III. Five of the songs were edited from their original length in order to fit them onto a single CD.

== Track listing ==
All tracks credited to Roy Harper

1. "Death Or Glory?" – 5:05 (from Death or Glory?)
2. "Commune" – 4:35 (from Valentine)
3. "Me And My Woman" – 3:52 (from Stormcock)
4. "Male Chauvinist Pig Blues" – 3:33 (from Valentine)
5. "Highway Blues" – 6:32 (from Lifemask)
6. "You" – 4:34 (from The Unknown Soldier)
7. "Nineteen Forty-Eightish" – 5:27 (from Whatever Happened to Jugula?)
8. "Another Day" (Live) – 3:58 (from Flashes from the Archives of Oblivion)
9. "Don't You Grieve" – 2:34 (from Flat Baroque and Berserk)
10. "Ten Years Ago" – 3:21 (from Commercial Breaks)
11. "These Fifty Years" – 6:34 (from The Dream Society)
12. "One Of Those Days In England (Part 1)" – 3:25 (from Bullinamingvase)
13. "The Same Old Rock" – 11:37 (from Stormcock)
14. "The Game" – 6:55 (from HQ)

== Personnel ==
- Roy Harper
- Ian Anderson
- David Bedford
- Bill Bruford
- Kate Bush
- David Gilmour
- John Paul Jones
- Ronnie Lane
- Alvin Lee
- Paul McCartney
- Linda McCartney
- Keith Moon
- Jimmy Page
- Chris Spedding
