= Poems, Speeches, Thoughts and Doodles =

Studio album by Roy Harper
- Released: 1997
- Recorded: Ireland November 1997
- Genre: Spoken word
- Length: 57:56
- Label: Science Friction HUCD034
- Producer: Roy Harper

Roy Harper chronology
Commercial Breaks (1994)	Poems, Speeches, Thoughts and Doodles (1997)	The Dream Society (1998)

Poems, Speeches, Thoughts and Doodles is the 19th album by Roy Harper and was released in 1997.

== History ==
The spoken word album features 34 of Harper's poems and songs, and was originally only available via mail order or at Harper's concerts. Now out of print on CD, it can be difficult obtain; copies have sold for over $290 (US) on eBay. However, the album is available to purchase as a download from Harper's website.

The album is primarily a collection of Harpers poetry containing spoken versions of some earlier Harper recordings, such as "The Spirit Lives", "Commune" and "Pinches Of Salt" and at least one poem ("The Angel Of The Night") that would later become a song on the 1998 album, The Dream Society. Occasional guitar by Harper and Jeff Martin punctuates certain tracks, most notably on "Timelords in the Frost" which is the only track on the CD credited to both artists.

== Track listing ==
All tracks credited to Roy Harper (except "Timelords In The Frost" - Roy Harper / Jeff Martin)

1. "First Thing in the Morning" – 2:58 (Original song on The Unknown Soldier)
2. "Blow by Blow" – 1:10
3. "The Spirit Lives" – 2:47 (Original song on HQ)
4. "Lunchtime Sandwich Secretaries" – 1:17
5. "November" – 0:19
6. "The Arty Fartique (The Critic)" – 0:56
7. "Bad Speech 2 (A Degree of Disbelief)" – 3:53 (A direct descendant of "Bad Speech" on Whatever Happened to Jugula?)
8. "Timelords in the Frost" – 2:22
9. "Angel of the Night" – 1:31 (Became song on The Dream Society)
10. "Hidden by Numbers" – 1:14
11. "Hole in the Sky" – 0:26
12. "Overnight Success" – 1:11 (a.k.a. the song, "The Boy Stood on the Burning Deck")
13. "Nero" – 0:40
14. "Clones" – 1:33
15. "Constant Sorrow" – 1:53
16. "BUPA" – 1:55
17. "Extreme Middle Age" – 3:57
18. "The Night Aglow" – 0:37
19. "Filthy Stain Hussein" – 2:06
20. "Your Tongue in Their Cheeks" – 1:48
21. "Commune" – 2:22 (Original song on Valentine)
22. "Tel" – 0:50
23. "Descendants of Smith" – 1:22 (Original song on Descendants of Smith)
24. "Our Father" – 3:36
25. "Crystal Shoes" – 0:28
26. "The Afternoon Sun" – 0:19
27. "The Unknown" – 1:05
28. "And Yet" – 3:19
29. "Auto Farrier" – 1:04
30. "Ere Winter Ends" – 0:32
31. "Ghost Dance" – 1:24 (Original song on Once)
32. "Pinches of Salt" – 1:32 (Original song on Descendants of Smith)
33. "The Song That Never Ends" – 0:57
34. "Love Me" – 4:33

== Personnel ==
- Roy Harper
- Jeff Martin
- Darren Crisp - mastering
- Colin Curwood - photography
