= East of the Sun (Roy Harper album) =

Compilation album by Roy Harper
- Released: 2001
- Recorded: Ireland / England
- Genre: Folk, rock
- Length: 57:13
- Label: Science Friction HUCD034
- Producer: Roy Harper

Roy Harper chronology
Hats Off (2001)	East of the Sun (2001)	Today Is Yesterday (2002)

Professional ratings
Review scores
Source	Rating

East of the Sun is a 2001 compilation album by English folk/rock singer-songwriter Roy Harper featuring 15 of his love songs.

== History ==
Of the songs chose for the album, Harper said;

My songs are my diary, and the love songs are a great part of the emotional journal...not long ago we made a tally of categories of my songs. It was pretty loose, you know, agit prop, humour, social commentary etc..., but there was a surprise in it. 39% of the songs involved love in one form or another. Actually I was amazed.

Of the individuals referred to within (or by) the songs Harper stated,

Two of the women are Swedish, one of the men has left the planet and the other is related. Now there's some arcane trivia.

== Track listing ==
All tracks credited to Roy Harper

1. "I'll See You Again" – 5:00 (from Valentine)
2. "Francesca" – 1:20 (from Flat Baroque and Berserk)
3. "Another Day" – 2:59 (from Flat Baroque and Berserk)
4. "North Country" – 3:29 (from Valentine)
5. "South Africa" – 4:04 (from Lifemask)
6. "The Flycatcher" – 4:09 (from The Unknown Soldier)
7. "My Friend" – 3:42 (from Sophisticated Beggar)
8. "East Of The Sun" – 3:04 (from Flat Baroque and Berserk)
9. "Commune" – 4:34 (from Valentine)
10. "Davey" – 1:31 (from Flat Baroque and Berserk)
11. "Twelve Hours Of Sunset" – 4:45 (from Valentine)
12. "Hallucinating Light" – 6:05 (from HQ)
13. "Forever" – 2:48 (from Valentine)
14. "Sexy Woman" – 6:29 (from The Green Man)
15. "Frozen Moment" – 3:20 (from Whatever Happened to Jugula?)

== Personnel ==
- Roy Harper – Guitar and vocals
- David Bedford
- Steve Broughton
- Bill Bruford – drums
- Dave Cochrane
- Dave Lawson – Keyboard
- Tony Levin
- Jeff Martin
- Andy Newmark
- Jimmy Page – Guitar
- Andy Roberts – Guitar
- Chris Spedding – Guitar
- Pete Wingfield – Keyboard
- Robert Irivie – Photography
- Colin Curwood – Photography
- Harry Pearce – Design
