= Prophet =

Intermediary between humanity and the divine

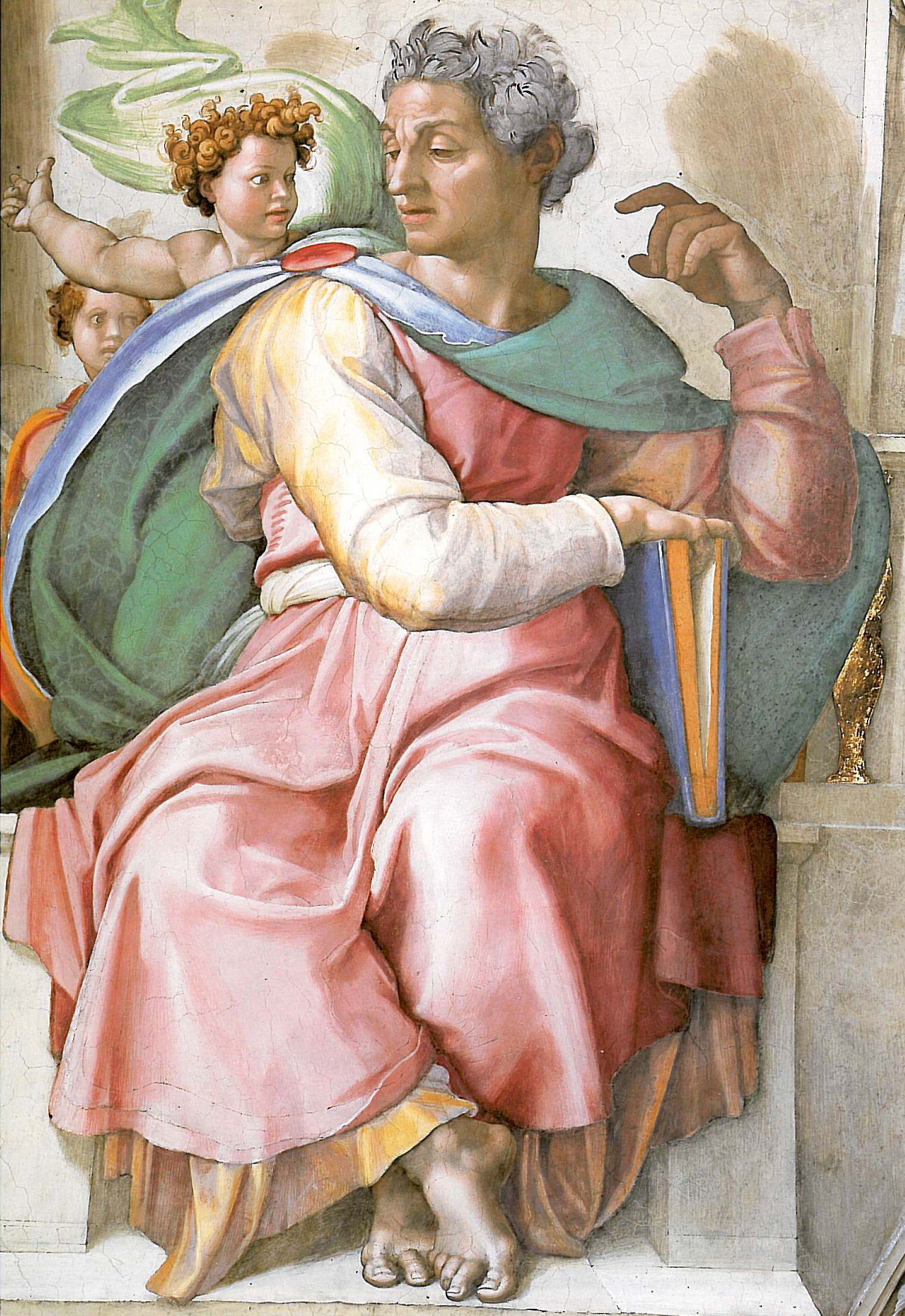
Isaiah, an important Biblical prophet, in fresco on the Sistine Chapel ceiling by Michelangelo

In religion, a prophet or prophetess is an individual who is regarded as being in contact with a divine being and a conduit for that being, serving as an intermediary with humanity by delivering messages or teachings from the supernatural source to other people. The message that the prophet conveys is called a prophecy.

Prophethood has existed in many cultures and religions throughout history, including Mesopotamian religion, Zoroastrianism, Buddhism, the Abrahamic religions, Mandaeism, Manichaeism, and Thelema.

== Etymology ==
The English word prophet is the transliteration of a compound Greek word derived from pro- (before/toward) and phesein (to tell); thus, a προφήτης (prophḗtēs) is someone who conveys messages from the divine to humans, including occasionally foretelling future events. In a different interpretation, it means advocate or speaker.

It is used to translate the Hebrew word נָבִיא (nāvî) in the Septuagint and the Arabic word نبي (nabī) in the Quran. W. F. Albright points to the Akkadian god Nabu (𒀭𒀝 Nabû) for the origin of these words. Nabû means "announcer" or "authorised person", derived from the Semitic root n-b-y or nbʾ. It is cognate with Classical Syriac: ܢܒܝܐ, romanized: nəḇiyyā, Arabic: نبي, romanized: nabiyy, and Hebrew: נביא, romanized: nāḇī, all meaning 'prophet'.

In Hebrew, the word נָבִיא (nāvî), "spokesperson", traditionally translates as "prophet". The second subdivision of the Tanakh, Nevi'im, is devoted to the Hebrew prophets. The meaning of navi is perhaps described in Deuteronomy 18:18, where God says, "... and I will put My words in his mouth, and he shall speak unto them all that I shall command him." Thus, a navi was thought to be the "mouth" of God. A Jewish tradition was that the root n-b-a (navi) is based on the two-letter root n-b which denotes hollowness or openness; to receive transcendental wisdom, one must make oneself "open".

== Mesopotamian origins ==
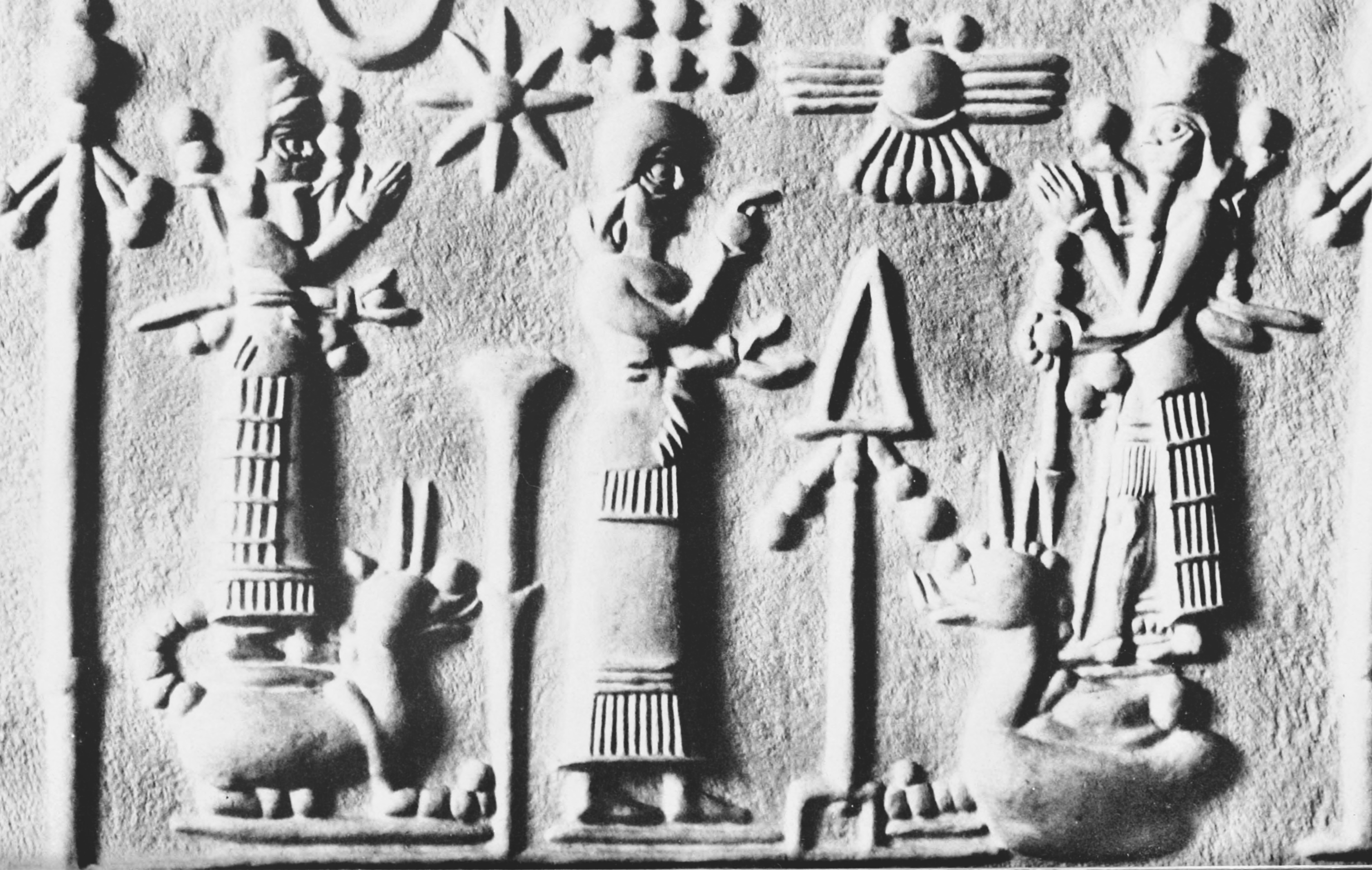
Late Assyrian seal. Worshipper between Nabu and Marduk, standing on their servant dragon Mušḫuššu, eighth century BCE.

Before the advent of Zoroastrianism and the prophetic tradition established by Zoroaster, various ancient civilizations had individuals who served as intermediaries between humanity and the divine. In ancient Sumer, for instance, figures such as the "ensi" or "lugal" fulfilled roles akin to prophets, offering guidance and interpreting divine will through rituals, omens, and prayers. The ensi was considered a representative of the city-state's patron deity. The functions of a lugal would include certain ceremonial and cultic activities, arbitration in border disputes, and military defence against external enemies. The ensis of Lagash would sometimes refer to the city's patron deity, Ningirsu, as their lugal ("master"). All of the above is connected to the possibly priestly or sacral character of the titles ensi and especially en (the latter term continuing to designate priests in subsequent times).

These prophets, while lacking the systematic theological framework found in later traditions, laid the groundwork for the concept of prophethood by demonstrating a connection with the divine and providing spiritual leadership within their communities. Despite the absence of codified scripture or organized religious institutions, these pre-Zoroastrian prophetic figures played a crucial role in shaping early religious thought and practices, paving the way for the structured prophetic tradition that emerged with Zoroaster and subsequent religious traditions.

== Zoroastrianism ==
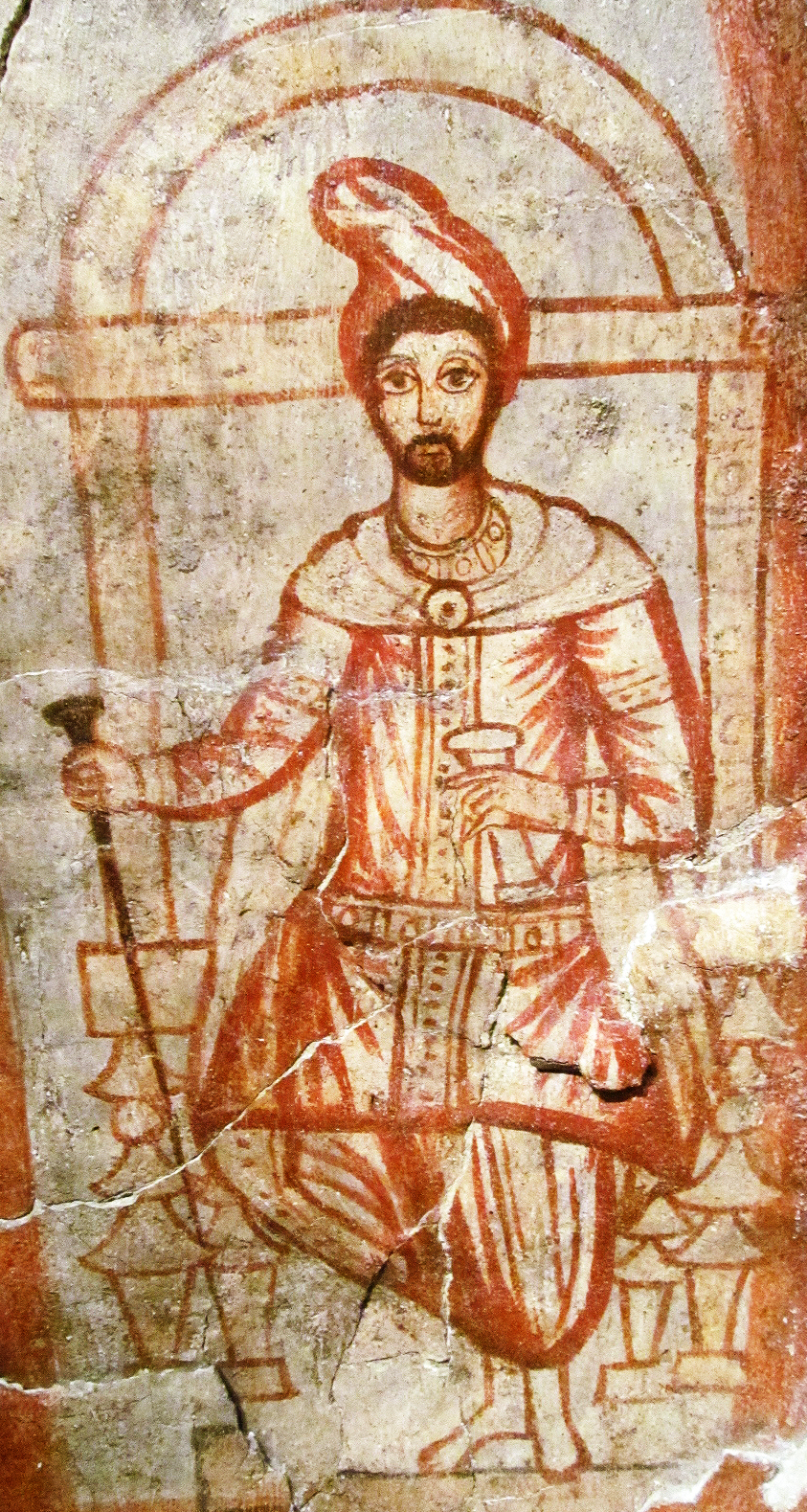
3rd-century Mithraic depiction of Zoroaster found in Dura Europos, Syria by Franz Cumont

Zoroastrianism holds a significant position in shaping the concept of prophets and prophecy. Founded by the revered figure Zoroaster (or Zarathustra) in ancient Persia around the 6th century BCE, Zoroastrianism introduced fundamental ideas that profoundly influenced subsequent religious and philosophical traditions, particularly in its portrayal of prophetic figures.

At the heart of Zoroastrian belief lies the concept of a singular supreme deity, Ahura Mazda, engaged in an eternal struggle against the forces of darkness and chaos, embodied by Angra Mainyu. Zoroaster, as the primary prophet of this faith, received divine revelations and visions from Ahura Mazda, which formed the basis of the Avesta, the sacred scripture of Zoroastrianism.

Zoroaster's role as a prophet established a template for future religious leaders and visionaries. He articulated monotheistic principles, ethical dualism, and the idea of a cosmic battle between good and evil, influencing not only the religious landscape of ancient Persia but also later traditions such as Judaism, Christianity, Islam, and Thelema.

The legacy of Zoroastrianism in shaping the understanding of prophets is profound. Zoroaster's direct communication with the divine, his role as a mediator between humanity and the divine will, and his teachings about moral righteousness laid the groundwork for the concept of prophethood as it evolved in subsequent religious traditions.

Influence from Zoroastrian thought can be seen in the characterization of prophets as individuals chosen by a single supreme deity to convey divine messages, guide communities, and uphold moral principles. The structured prophetic tradition established by Zoroaster set a precedent for future prophets, shaping how societies perceive and interact with visionary figures throughout history.

While other ancient civilizations may have had individuals who served similar functions, Zoroastrianism's systematic approach to prophecy and its enduring influence on subsequent religious thought solidified its place in history as a foundational example of prophetic tradition, enriching humanity's understanding of the divine and the role of prophets in conveying its will.

== Judaism ==
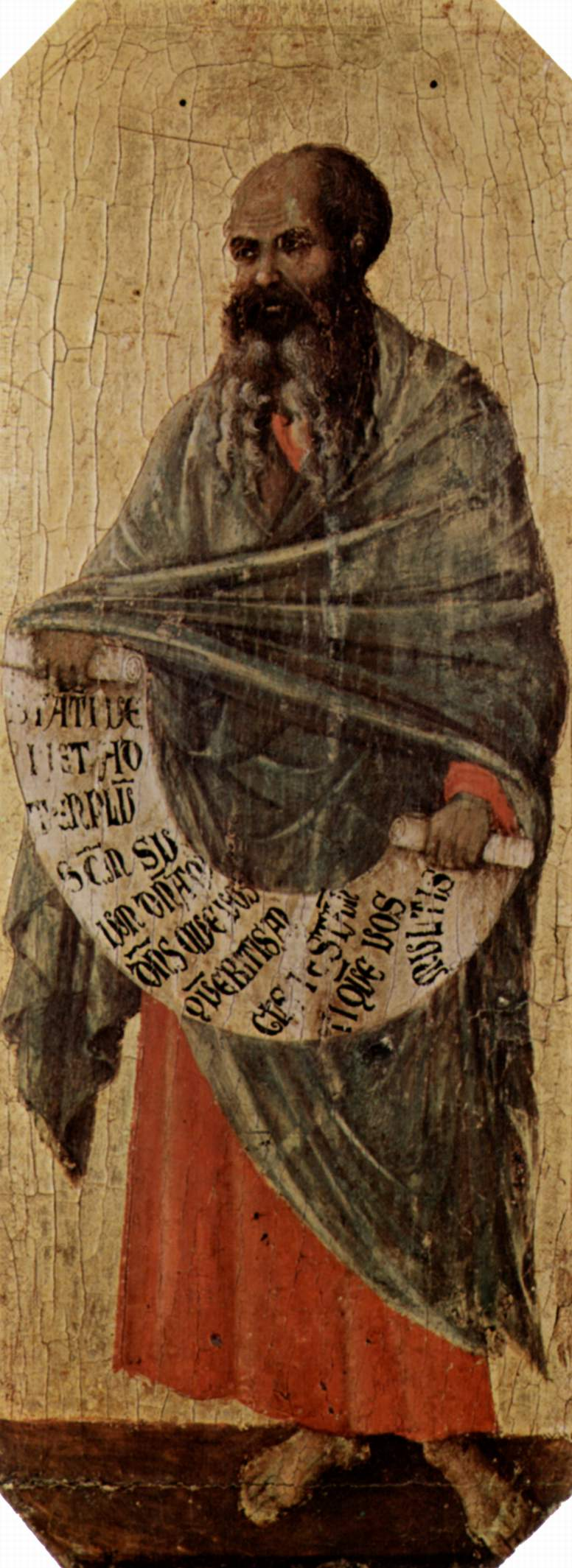
Malachi, one of the last prophets of Israel, painting by Duccio di Buoninsegna, c. 1310 (Museo dell'Opera del Duomo, Siena Cathedral). "He [Mashiach] will turn the hearts of the parents to their children, and the hearts of the children to their parents" (Malachi 4:6).

Some examples of prophets in the Tanakh include Abraham, Moses, Miriam, Isaiah, Samuel, Ezekiel, Malachi, and Job. Moses is considered the most important prophet in Judaism. On one occasion during the Exodus journey, "the spirit which was upon Moses" was passed to seventy elders, who were also able to prophesy for one time only, but mostly they could not prophesy again. Moses expressed the hope that "all the LORD's people" could be prophets. In addition to writing and speaking messages from God, Israelite or Judean nevi'im ("spokespersons", "prophets") often acted out prophetic parables in their life. For example, in order to contrast the people's disobedience with the obedience of the Rechabites, God has Jeremiah invite the Rechabites to drink wine, in disobedience to their ancestor's command. The Rechabites refuse, for which God commends them. Other prophetic parables acted out by Jeremiah include burying a linen belt so that it gets ruined to illustrate how God intends to ruin Judah's pride. Likewise, Jeremiah buys a clay jar and smashes it in the Valley of Ben Hinnom in front of elders and priests to illustrate that God will smash the nation of Judah and the city of Judah beyond repair. God instructs Jeremiah to make a yoke from wood and leather straps and to put it on his own neck to demonstrate how God will put the nation under the yoke of Nebuchadnezzar, king of Babylon. In a similar way, the prophet Isaiah had to walk stripped and barefoot for three years to illustrate the coming captivity, and the prophet Ezekiel had to lie on his side for 390 days and to eat measured food to illustrate the coming siege.

Prophetic assignment is usually portrayed as rigorous and exacting in the Hebrew Bible, and prophets were often the target of persecution and opposition. God's personal prediction for Jeremiah, "And they shall fight against thee; but they shall not prevail against thee", was performed many times in the biblical narrative as Jeremiah warned of destruction of those who continued to refuse repentance and accept more moderate consequences. In return for his adherence to God's discipline and speaking God's words, Jeremiah was attacked by his own brothers, beaten and put into the stocks by a priest and false prophet, imprisoned by the king, threatened with death, thrown into a cistern by Judah's officials, and opposed by a false prophet. Likewise, Isaiah was told by his hearers who rejected his message, "Leave the way! Get off the path! Let us hear no more about the Holy One of Israel!" The life of Moses being threatened by Pharaoh is another example.

According to I Samuel 9:9, the old name for navi is ro'eh רֹאֶה, which literally means "seer". That could document an ancient shift, from viewing prophets as seers for hire to viewing them as moral teachers. L. C. Allen (1971) comments that in the First Temple Era, there were essentially seer-priests belonging to a guild, who performed divination, rituals, and sacrifices, and were scribes; and beside these were canonical prophets, who did none of these things (and condemned divination), but came to deliver a message. The seer-priests were usually attached to a local shrine or temple, such as Shiloh, and initiated others into that priesthood, acting as a mystical craft-guild with apprentices and recruitment. Canonical prophets were not organised this way.

A Jewish tradition suggests that there were twice as many prophets as the number which left Egypt, which would make 1,200,000 prophets. The Talmud recognizes 48 male prophets who bequeathed permanent messages to humankind. According to the Talmud, there were also seven women counted as prophetesses whose message bears relevance for all generations: Sarah, Miriam, Devorah, Hannah (mother of the prophet Samuel), Abigail (a wife of King David), Huldah (from the time of Jeremiah), and Esther. The Talmudic and Biblical commentator Rashi points out that Rebecca, Rachel, and Leah were also prophets. Isaiah 8:3-4 refers to Isaiah's wife, who bore his son Maher-shalal-hash-baz as "the prophetess"; she is not referred to elsewhere.

Prophets in the Tanakh are not always Jews; note for example the non-Jewish prophet Balaam in Numbers 22. According to the Talmud, Obadiah is said to have been a convert to Judaism.

The last nevi'im mentioned in the Jewish Bible are Haggai, Zechariah, and Malachi, all of whom lived at the end of the 70-year Babylonian exile of c. 586 to 539 BCE. The Talmud (Sanhedrin 11a) states that Haggai, Zachariah, and Malachi were the last prophets, and later times have known only the Bath Kol (בת קול, lit. daughter of a voice, "voice of God").

== Christianity ==
=== Traditional definitions ===
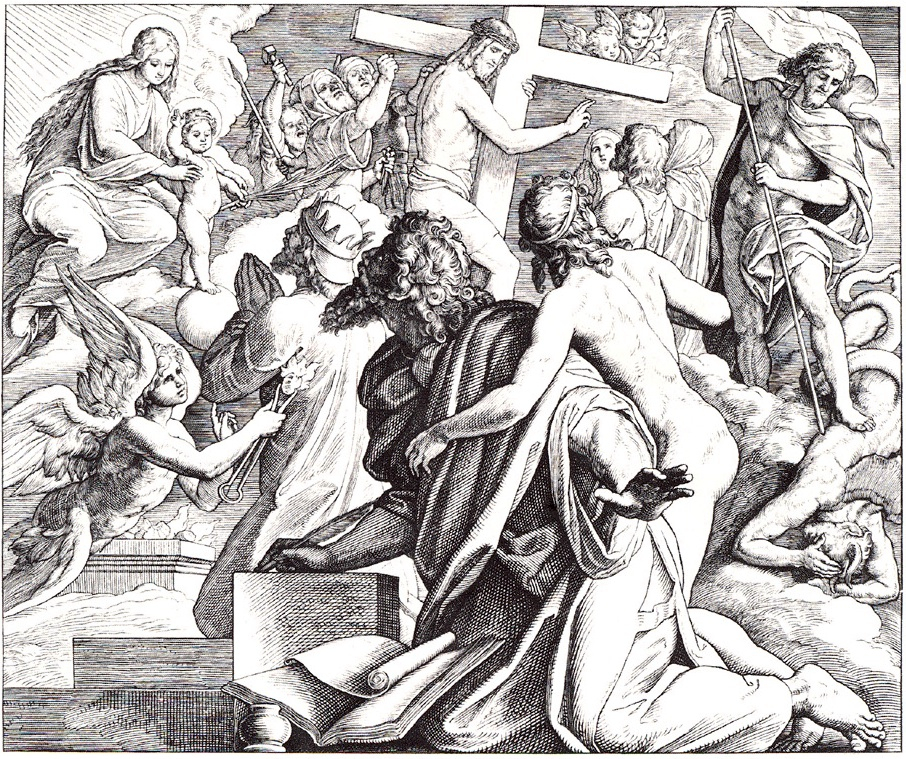
The Vision of Isaiah is depicted in this 1860 woodcut by Julius Schnorr von Karolsfeld.

In Christianity, a prophet (or seer) is one inspired by God through the Holy Spirit to deliver a message. This includes Jewish prophets active before the church began and the prophets active in the Christian church. Some Christian denominations limit a prophet's message to words intended only for active members of a congregation, excluding social or political messages. However, the Bible has several occasions in which prophets were called to deliver social or political messages. The reception of a message is termed revelation and the delivery of the message is termed prophecy.

The term "prophet" applies to those who receive public or private revelation. Public revelation, in Catholicism, is part of the Deposit of faith, the revelation of which was completed by Jesus; whereas private revelation does not add to the Deposit. The term "deposit of faith" refers to the entirety of Jesus Christ's revelation, and is passed to successive generations through scripture and the traditions of the church.

The Bible applies the appellation 'false prophet' to anyone who preaches a Gospel contrary to that delivered to the apostles and recorded in Sacred Scripture. One Old Testament text in Deuteronomy contains a warning against those who prophesy events which do not come to pass and says they should be put to death. Elsewhere a false prophet may be someone who is purposely trying to deceive, is delusional, under the influence of Satan or is speaking from his own spirit.

==== Catholicism ====
Six of the Minor Prophets are commemorated in December. Each encouraged people to return to God, to repent of past sins, and to recognize God's presence even in their difficulties.

"Jesus Christ is the one whom the Father anointed with the Holy Spirit and established as priest, prophet, and king. The whole People of God participates in these three offices of Christ and bears the responsibilities for mission and service that flow from them." The laity act prophetically when they speak the truth, and live the Gospel by example before their families, neighbors, and co-workers. The Old Testament prophets defended the poor and powerless "and inspire Catholic Social Teaching on the preferential option for the poor, workers’ rights, and justice and peace."

=== Ongoing prophecy ===
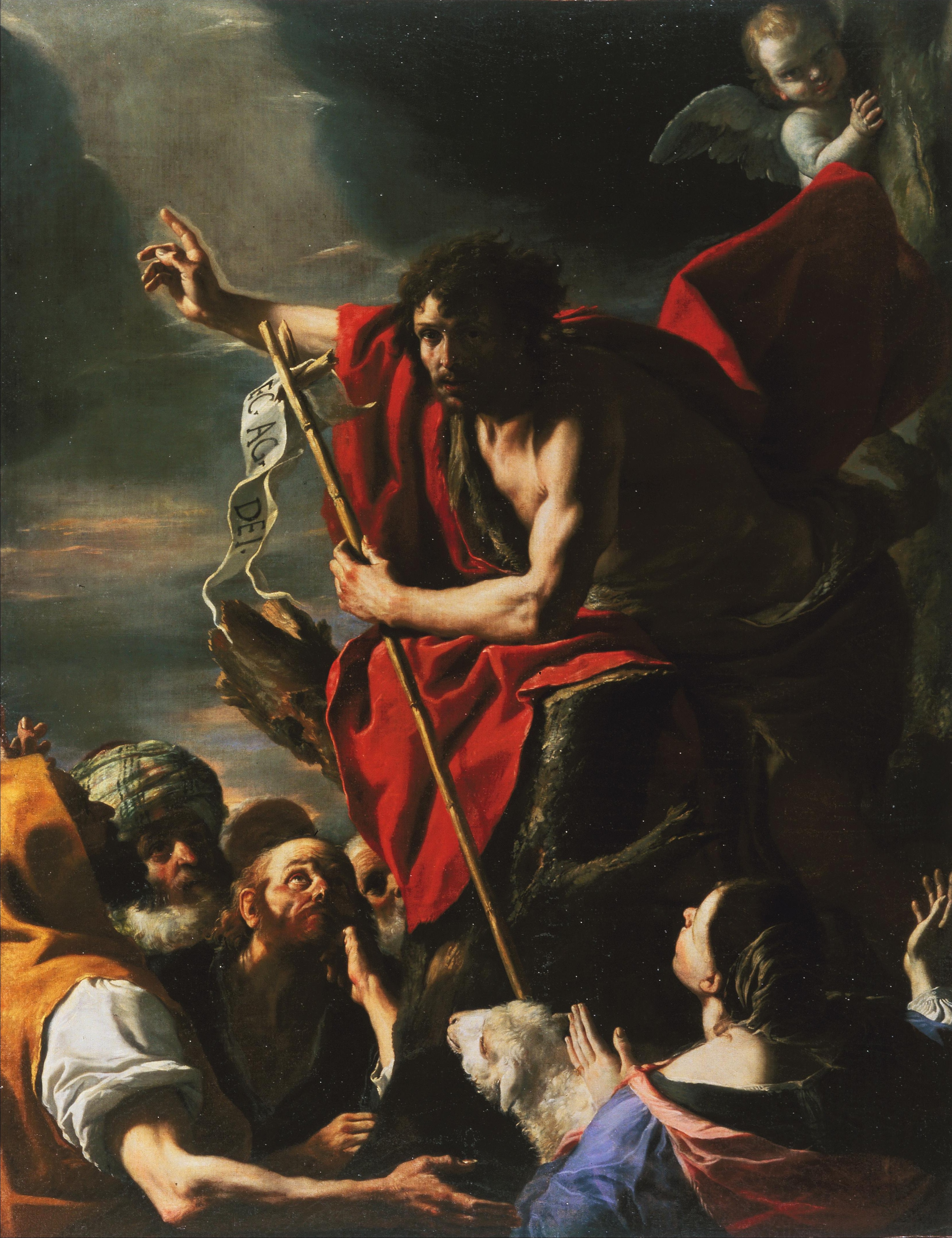
St. John the Baptist Preaching, c. 1665, by Mattia Preti

Christians who believe that the Holy Spirit continues to give spiritual gifts to Christians are known as continuationists. These charismata may include prophecy, tongues, miraculous healing ability, and discernment (Matthew 12:32 KJV "Whosoever speaketh a word against the Son of Man, it shall be forgiven him: but whosoever speaketh against the Holy Ghost, it shall not be forgiven him, neither in this world, neither in the world to come."). Cessationists believe that these gifts were given only in New Testament times and that they ceased after the last apostle died.

The last prophet of the Old Covenant before the arrival of Jesus is John the Baptist. New Testament passages that explicitly discuss prophets existing after the death and resurrection of Christ include Revelation 11:10, Matthew 10:40–41 and 23:34, John 13:20 and 15:20 and Acts 11:25–30, 13:1 and 15:32.

The Didache gives extensive instruction in how to distinguish between true and false prophets, as well as commands regarding tithes to prophets in the church. Irenaeus, wrote of 2nd-century believers with the gift of prophecy, while Justin Martyr argued in his Dialogue with Trypho that prophets were not found among the Jews in his time, but that the church had prophets. The Shepherd of Hermas describes revelation in a vision regarding the proper operation of prophecy in the church. Eusebius mentions that Quadratus and Ammia of Philadelphia were both prominent prophets following the age of the Twelve Apostles. Tertullian, writing of the church meetings of the Montanists (to whom he belonged), described in detail the practice of prophecy in the 2nd-century church.

A number of later Christian saints were said to have powers of prophecy, such as Columba of Iona (521–597), Saint Malachy (1094–1148) or Padre Pio (1887–1968). Marian apparitions like those at Fatima in 1917 or at Kibeho in Rwanda in the 1980s often included prophetic predictions regarding the future of the world as well as of the local areas they occurred in.

Prophetic movements in particular can be traced throughout the Christian Church's history, expressing themselves in (for example) Montanism, Novatianism, Donatism, Franciscanism, Anabaptism, Camisard enthusiasm, Puritanism, Quakerism, Quietism, Lutheranism and Radical Pietism. Modern Pentecostals and Charismatics, members of movements which together comprised approximately 584 million people as of 2011, believe in the contemporary function of the gift of prophecy, and some in these movements, especially those within the Apostolic-Prophetic Movement, allow for idea that God may continue to gift the church with some individuals who are prophets.

Some Christian sects recognize the existence of "modern-day" prophets. One such denomination is the Church of Jesus Christ of Latter-day Saints, which teaches that God still communicates with humankind through prophecy.

==== Latter Day Saint movement ====
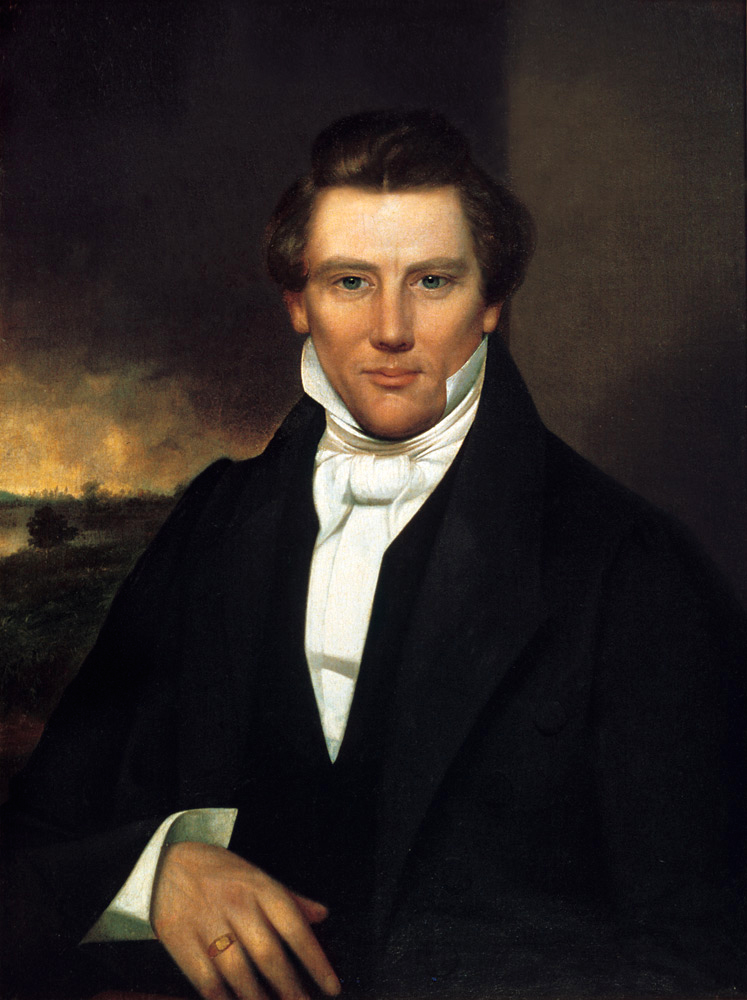
A portrait of Joseph Smith

Joseph Smith, who established the Church of Christ in 1830, is considered a prophet by members of the Latter Day Saint movement, of which the Church of Jesus Christ of Latter-day Saints (LDS Church) is the largest denomination. Additionally, many churches within the movement believe in a succession of modern prophets (accepted by Latter Day Saints as "prophets, seers, and revelators") since the time of Joseph Smith, Dallin H. Oaks is the current Prophet and President of the Church of Jesus Christ of Latter-day Saints.

==== Adventism ====
Baptist preacher William Miller is credited with beginning the mid-19th century North American religious movement now known as Adventism. He announced a Second Coming, resulting in the Great Disappointment.

==== Seventh-day Adventist ====
The Seventh-day Adventist Church, which was established in 1863, believes that Ellen G. White, one of the church's founders, was given the spiritual gift of prophecy.

==== Branch Davidians ====
The Branch Davidians are a religious cult which was founded in 1959 by Benjamin Roden as an offshoot of the Seventh-Day Adventist Church. David Koresh, who died in the Waco Siege in 1993, called himself their final prophet and "the Son of God, the Lamb" in 1983.

== Manichaeism ==
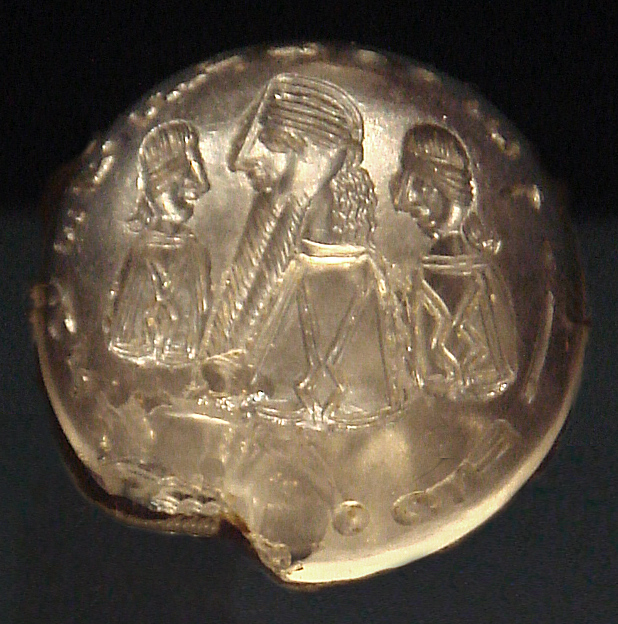
Sealstone of Mani, rock crystal, possibly 3rd century AD, Iraq. Cabinet des Médailles, Paris. The seal reads "Mani, messenger of the messiah", and may have been used by Mani himself to sign his epistles.

Mani (Note: Middle Persian: 𐭌𐭀𐭍𐭉/𐭬𐭠𐭭𐭩/𐮋𐮀𐮌𐮈/𐬨𐬁𐬥𐬌/𐫖𐫀𐫗𐫏 Māni, New Persian: مانی Māni, Chinese: 摩尼 Móní, Syriac Mānī, Greek Μάνης, Latin Manes; also Μανιχαῖος, Latin Manichaeus, from Syriac ܡܐܢܝ ܚܝܐ Mānī ḥayyā "Living Mani") (Persian: مانی, c. April AD 216–2 March AD 274 or 26 February AD 277) was an Iranian (Note: Boyce 2001, p. 111: "He was Iranian, of noble Parthian blood...") prophet and the founder of Manichaeism, a religion most prevalent in late antiquity.

Mani was born in or near Seleucia-Ctesiphon (south of modern Baghdad) in Mesopotamia, at the time part of the Parthian Empire. Seven of his major works were written in Syriac, and the eighth, dedicated to the Sasanian emperor Shapur I, was written in Middle Persian. He died in Gundeshapur.

Manichaeism teaches an elaborate dualistic cosmology describing the struggle between a good, spiritual world of light, and an evil, material world of darkness. Through an ongoing process that takes place in human history, light is gradually removed from the world of matter and returned to the world of light, whence it came. Mani's teaching was intended to "combine", succeed, and surpass the teachings of Christianity, Zoroastrianism, Buddhism, Marcionism, Hellenistic and Rabbinic Judaism, Gnostic movements, Ancient Greek religion, Babylonian and other Mesopotamian religions, and mystery cults. It reveres Mani as the final prophet after Zoroaster, the Gautama Buddha and Jesus Christ.

Manichaeism was quickly successful and spread far through Aramaic-speaking regions. It thrived between the third and seventh centuries, and at its height was one of the most widespread religions in the world. Manichaean churches and scriptures existed as far east as the Han dynasty and as far west as the Roman Empire. It was briefly the main rival to early Christianity in the competition to replace classical polytheism before the spread of Islam. Under the Roman Dominate, Manichaeism was persecuted by the Roman state and was eventually stamped out in the Roman Empire. While most of Manichaeism's original writings have been lost, numerous translations and fragmentary texts have survived.

Manichaeism has survived longer in the east than it did in the west. Although it was thought to have finally faded away after the 14th century in South China, contemporary to the decline of the Church of the East in Ming China, there is a growing corpus of evidence that shows Manichaeism persists in some areas of China, especially in Fujian, where numerous Manichaean relics have been discovered over time. The currently known sects are notably secretive and protective of their belief system, in an effort to remain undetected. This stems from fears relating to persecution and suppression during various periods of Chinese history.

== Islam ==
The Quran identifies a number of men as "Prophets of Islam" (Arabic: نبي nabī; pl. أنبياء anbiyāʾ). Muslims believe such individuals were assigned a special mission by God to guide humanity. Besides Muhammad, this includes prophets such as Abraham (Ibrāhīm), Moses (Mūsā) and Jesus (ʿĪsā).

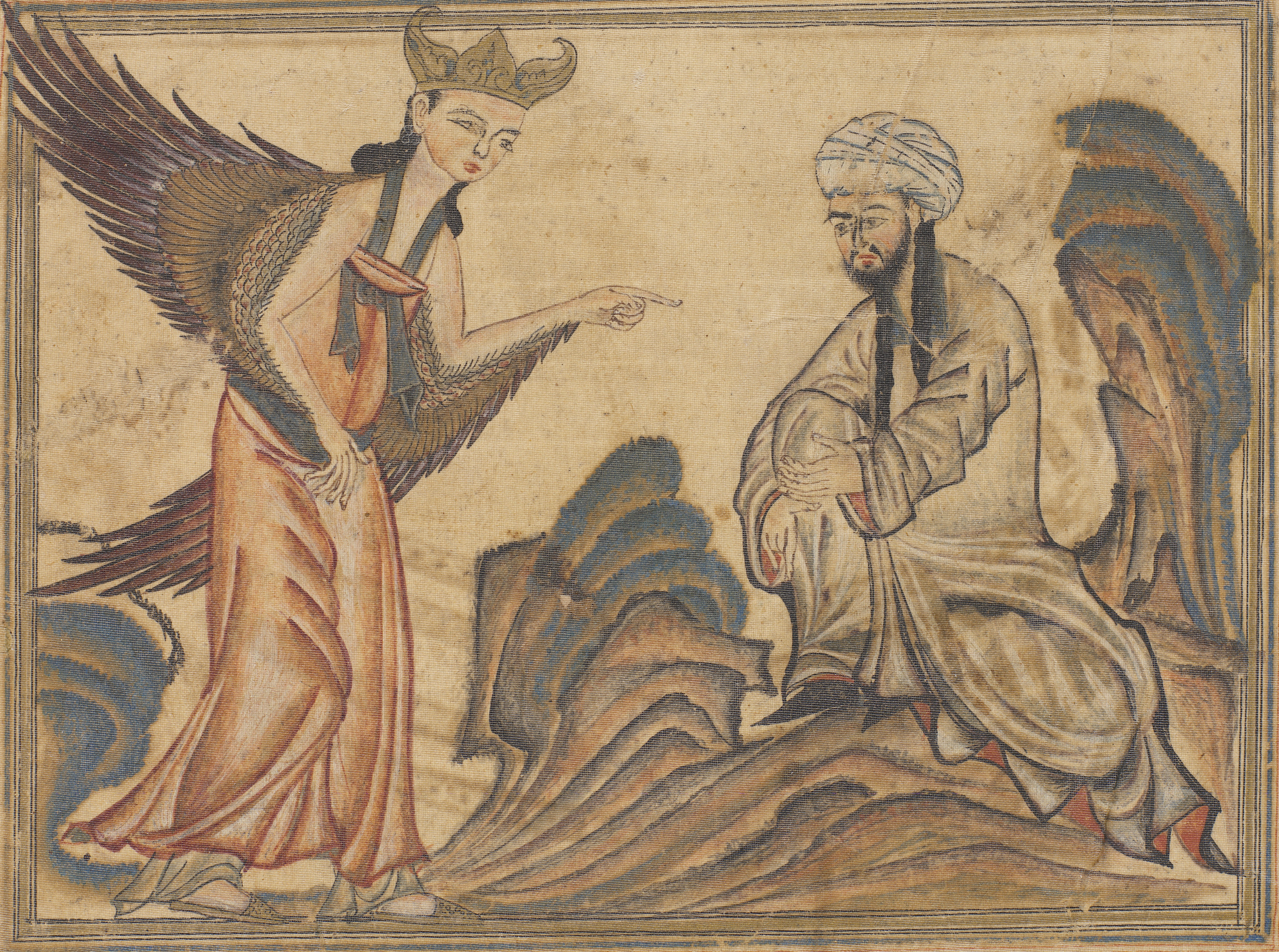
A depiction of Muhammad receiving his first revelation from the angel Gabriel. From the manuscript Jami' al-tawarikh by Rashid-al-Din Hamadani, 1307, Ilkhanate period.

Although only twenty-five prophets are mentioned by name in the Quran, a hadith (no. 21257 in Musnad Ahmad ibn Hanbal) mentions that there were (more or less) 124,000 prophets in total throughout history. Other traditions place the number of prophets at 224,000. The Quran says that God has sent a prophet to every group of people throughout time and that Muhammad is the last of the prophets, sent for the whole of humankind. The message of all the prophets is believed to be the same. In Islam, all prophetic messengers are prophets (such as Adam, Noah, Abraham, Moses, Jesus, and Muhammad) though not all prophets are prophetic messengers. The primary distinction is that a prophet is required to demonstrate God's law through his actions, character, and behavior without necessarily calling people to follow him, while a prophetic messenger is required to pronounce God's law (i.e. revelation) and call his people to submit and follow him. Muhammad is distinguished from the rest of the prophetic messengers and prophets in that God commissioned him to be the prophetic messenger to all of humankind. Many of these prophets are also found in the texts of Judaism (The Torah, the Prophets, and the Writings) and Christianity.

Muslims often refer to Muhammad as "the Prophet", in the form of a noun. Jesus is the result of a virgin birth in Islam as in Christianity, and is regarded as a prophet.

Although it offers many incidents from the lives of many prophets, the Quran focuses with special narrative and rhetorical emphasis on the careers of the first four of these five major prophets. Of all the figures before Muhammad, the significance of Jesus in Islam is reflected in his being mentioned in the Quran in 93 verses with various titles attached such as "Son of Mary" and other relational terms, mentioned directly and indirectly, over 187 times. He is thus the most mentioned person in the Quran by reference; 25 times by the name Isa, third-person 48 times, first-person 35 times, and the rest as titles and attributes. Moses (Musa) and Abraham (Ibrahim) are also referred to frequently in the Quran. As for the fifth, the Quran is frequently addressed directly to Muhammad, and it often discusses situations encountered by him. Direct use of his name in the text, however, is rare. Rarer still is the mention of Muhammad's contemporaries.

Several prominent exponents of the Fatimid Ismaili Imams explained that throughout history there have been six enunciators (natiqs) who brought the exoteric (zahir) revelation to humans, namely: Adam, Noah, Abraham, Moses, Jesus and Muhammad. They speak of a seventh enunciator (natiq), the Resurrector (Qa’im), who will unveil the esoteric (batin) meaning of all the previous revelations. He is believed to be the pinnacle and purpose of creation. The enunciators (sing. natiq) who are the Prophets and the Imams in their respective times, are the highest hierarch (hadd). The enunciators (natiqs) signal the beginning of a new age (dawr) in humankind, whereas the Imams unveil and present the esoteric (batin) meaning of the revelation to the people. These individuals are both known as the ‘Lord of the Age’ (sahib al-’asr) or the ‘Lord of the Time’ (sahib al-zaman). Through them, one can know God, and their invitation to humans to recognize God is called the invitation (da’wa).

According to Shia Islam, all Prophets and Imams are infallible and the belief in their abstinence from intentional and unintentional sins is a part of the creed. Thus, it is accordingly believed that they are the examples to be followed and that they act as they preach. This belief includes some ʾAwliyāʾ such as Lady Fatima and Lady Mary.

=== Ahmadiyya ===
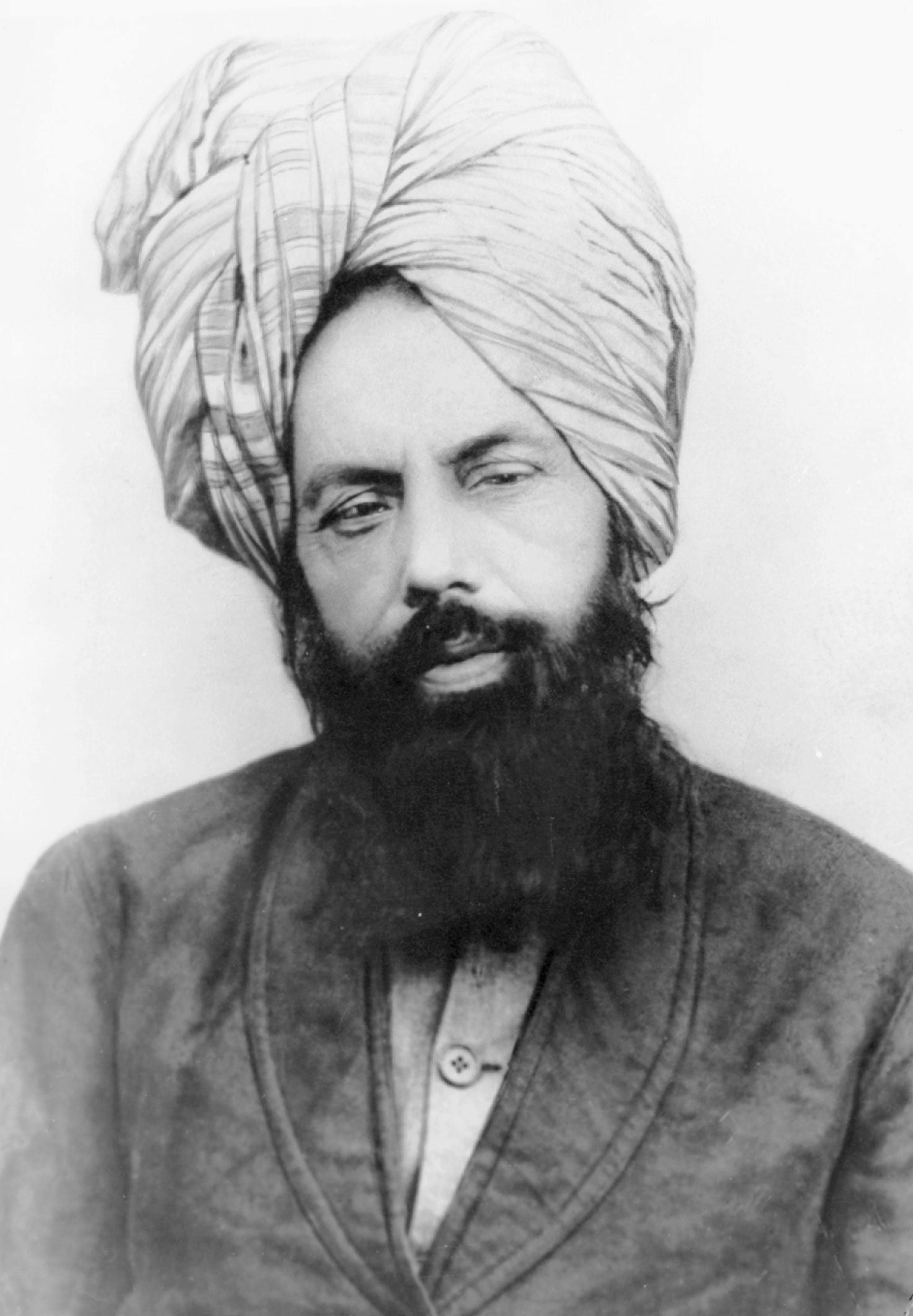
Mirzā Ghulām Aḥmad (1835–1908), a religious leader from India, and founder of the Ahmadiyya Movement in Islam.

During his lifetime, Mirzā Ghulām Aḥmad said that he was a prophet of God and became the founder of the Ahmadiyya Movement in Islam, which embodied the Mahdī of Islam and fulfilled the messianic prophecies regarding the coming of a savior to various other religious traditions, including Christianity and Hinduism.

Followers of the Ahmadiyya Movement in Islam believe that Mirzā Ghulām Aḥmad was a prophet of God, who is said to be a fulfillment of the various Islamic prophecies regarding the second advent of Jesus (ʿĪsā) before the end of time.

Ahmadi thought emphasizes the belief that Islam is the final dispensation for humanity as revealed to Muhammad and the necessity of restoring it to its true intent and pristine form, which had been lost through the centuries. Its adherents consider Ahmad to have appeared as the Mahdi—bearing the qualities of Jesus in accordance with their reading of scriptural prophecies—to revitalize Islam and set in motion its moral system that would bring about lasting peace. They believe that upon divine guidance he purged Islam of foreign accretions in belief and practice by championing what is, in their view, Islam's original precepts as practised by Muhammad and the early Muslim community. Ahmadis thus view themselves as leading the propagation and renaissance of Islam.

== Druze faith ==
In the Druze faith, seven spokesmen or prophets are considered and revered as messengers or intermediaries between God and mankind. These prophets include Adam, Noah, Abraham, Moses, Jesus, Muhammad and Muhammad ibn Isma'il. Each of them was sent in a different period of history to preach the message of God.

The Druze believe that each spokesman or prophet (natiq) has a "foundation" or "guardian" who is responsible for the esoteric, interpretative law, while the spokesman or prophet himself presents the apparent, obligatory law. The first prophet was Adam, whose foundation was Seth, although Adam did not have a mandate to introduce a law. Noah followed with a new law, superseding Adam's teachings, and his foundation was Shem. Then came Abraham, with Ishmael as his foundation, and Moses, whose foundation was Joshua son of Nun after Aaron's death. Jesus followed, with Simon Peter as his foundation, and finally, Muhammad, with Ali ibn Abi Talib as his foundation. The last figure is Abd Allah al-Mahdi Billah, the founder of the Fatimid Caliphate, whose foundation was al-Qaddah. With Hamza ibn Ali, the prophet of al-Hakim, a new era began, introducing a new law called the "Law of Tawhid" (Unification) or the "Third Path," which superseded all previous laws. Hamza ibn Ali was assisted by four boundaries mentioned in their tradition.

== Baháʼí Faith ==
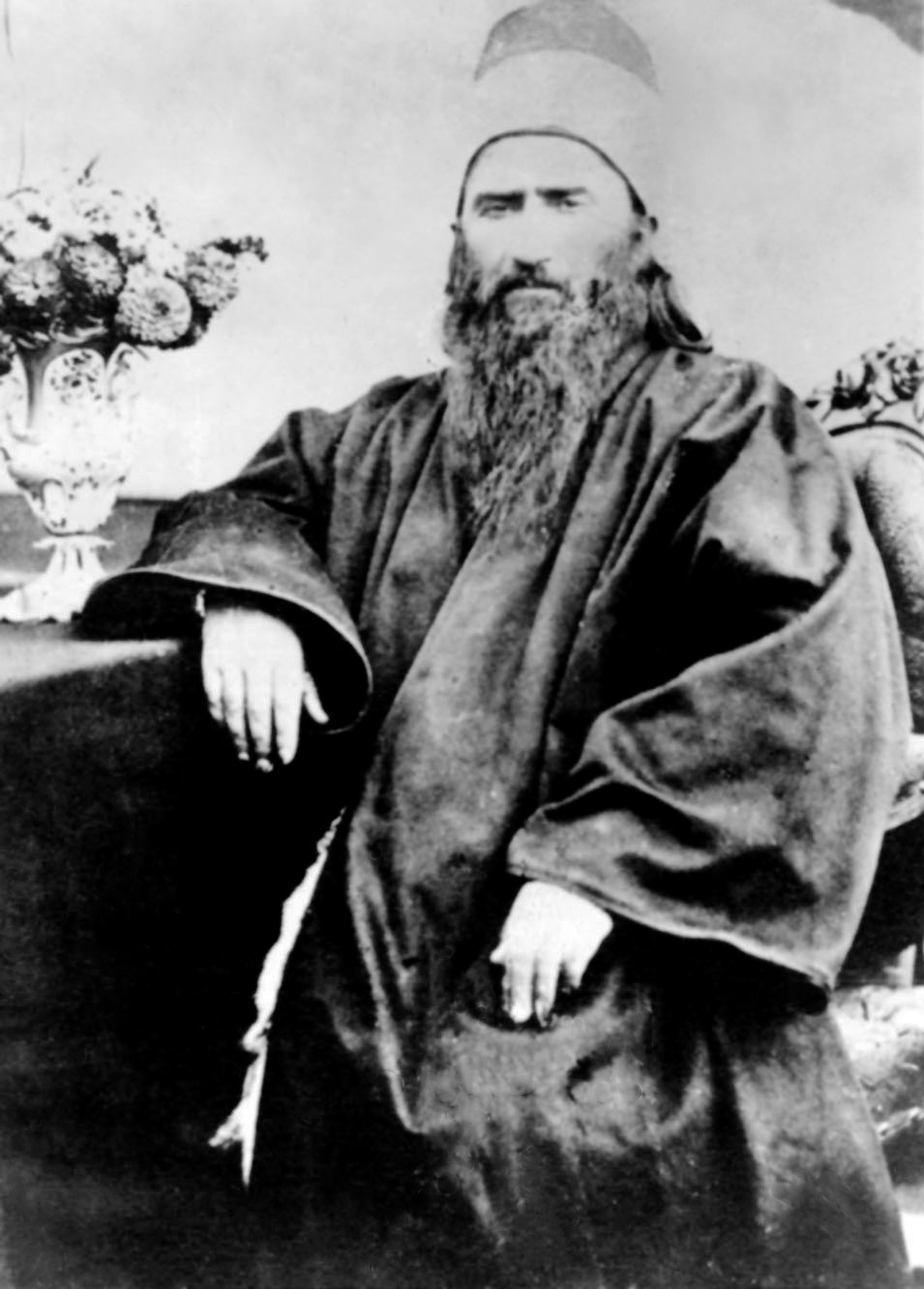
Baháʼu'lláh, the founder of the Baháʼí Faith

The Baháʼí Faith refers to what are commonly called prophets as "Manifestations of God" who are directly linked with the concept of progressive revelation. Baháʼís believe that the will of God is expressed at all times and in many ways, including through a series of divine messengers referred to as "Manifestations of God" or "divine educators". In expressing God's intent, these Manifestations are seen to establish religion in the world. Thus they are seen as an intermediary between God and humanity.

The Manifestations of God are not seen as incarnations of God, and are also not seen as ordinary mortals. Instead, the Baháʼí concept of the Manifestation of God emphasizes simultaneously the humanity of that intermediary and the divinity in the way they show forth the will, knowledge and attributes of God; thus they have both human and divine stations.

In addition to the Manifestations of God, there are also minor prophets. While the Manifestations of God, or major prophets, are compared to the Sun (which produces its own heat and light), minor prophets are compared to the Moon (which receives its light from the sun). Moses, for example, is taught as having been a Manifestation of God and his brother Aaron a minor prophet. Moses spoke on behalf of God, and Aaron spoke on behalf of Moses (Exodus 4:14–17). Other Jewish prophets are considered minor prophets, as they are considered to have come in the shadow of the dispensation of Moses to develop and consolidate the process he set in motion.

== Native Americans ==
The Great Peacemaker (sometimes referred to as Deganawida or Dekanawida) co-founded the Haudenosaunee league in pre-Columbian times. In retrospect, his prophecy of the boy seer could appear to refer to the conflict between natives and Europeans (white serpent).

From 1805 until the Battle of Tippecanoe that falsified his predictions in 1811, the "Shawnee prophet" Tenskwatawa led an Indian alliance to stop Europeans from taking more and more land going west. He reported visions he had. He is said to have accurately predicted a solar eclipse. His brother Tecumseh re-established the alliance for Tecumseh's War, that ended with the latter's death in 1813. Tecumseh fought together with British forces that, in the area of the Great Lakes, occupied essentially today's territory of Canada.

Francis the Prophet, influenced by Tecumseh and Tenskwatawa, was a leader of the Red Stick faction of the Creek Indians. He traveled to England in 1815 as a representative of the "four Indian nations" in an unsuccessful attempt to get Great Britain to help them resist the expansionism of the white settlers.

20 years later (1832), Wabokieshiek, the "Winnebago Prophet", after whom Prophetstown has been named, (also called "White Cloud") said that British forces would support the Indians in the Black Hawk War against the United States as 20 years earlier (based on "visions"). They did not, and he was no longer considered a "prophet".

In 1869, the Paiute Wodziwob founded the Ghost Dance movement. The dance rituals were an occasion to announce his visions of an earthquake that would swallow the whites. He seems to have died in 1872.

The Northern Paiute Wovoka said he had a vision during the solar eclipse of January 1, 1889, that the Paiute dead would come back and the whites would vanish from America, provided the natives performed Ghost Dances. This idea spread among other Native American peoples. The government were worried about a rebellion and sent troops, which lead to the death of Sitting Bull and to the Wounded Knee massacre in 1890.

== Thelema ==
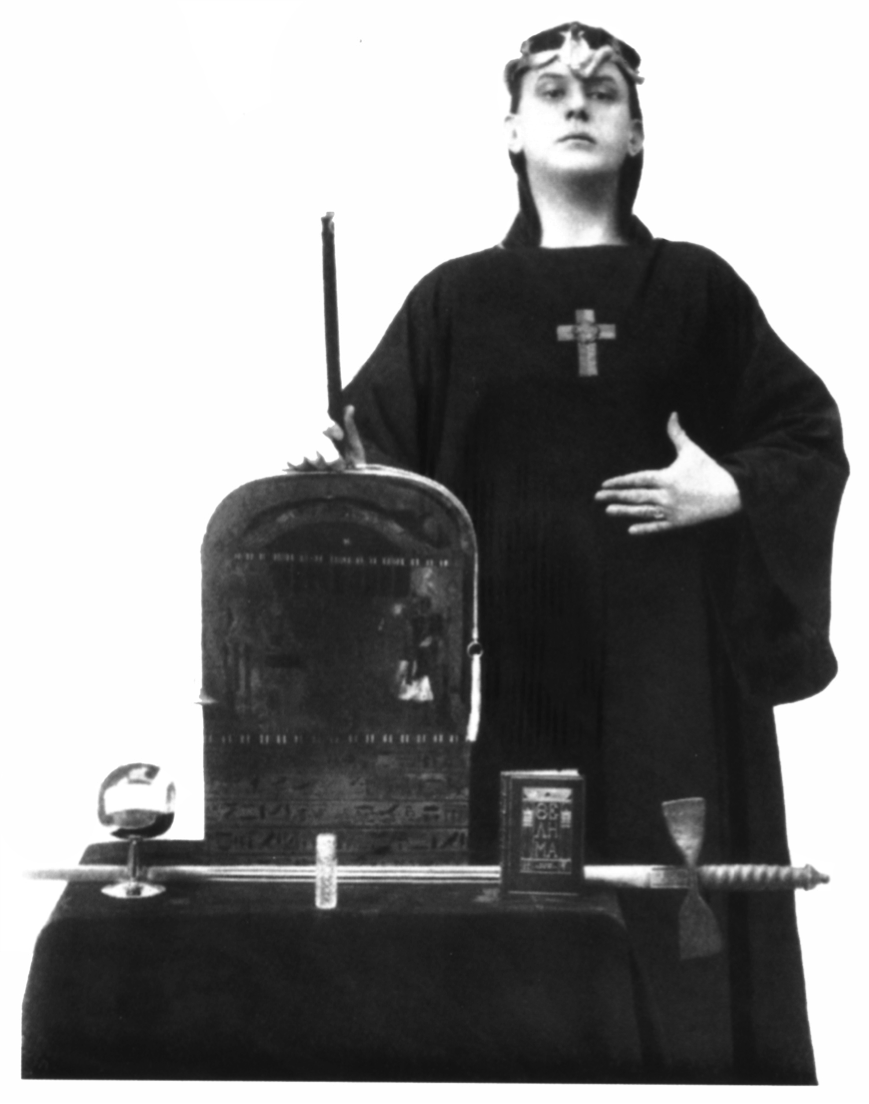
Crowley as Prophet of the Aeon of Horus with the Stele of Revealing and The Book of the Law, 1912

Aleister Crowley (1875–1947) was an English occultist, philosopher, ceremonial magician, poet, painter, novelist and mountaineer. He founded the religion of Thelema, identifying himself as the prophet entrusted with guiding humanity into the Æon of Horus in the early 20th century. A prolific writer, he published widely over the course of his life.

According to Crowley's later statements, on 8 April he heard a disembodied voice identifying itself as that of Aiwass, the messenger of Horus, or Hoor-Paar-Kraat. Crowley said that he wrote down everything the voice told him over the course of the next three days, and titled it Liber AL vel Legis or The Book of the Law. The book proclaimed that humanity was entering a new Aeon, and that Crowley would serve as its prophet. It stated that a supreme moral law was to be introduced in this Aeon, "Do what thou wilt shall be the whole of the Law," and that people should learn to live in tune with their Will. This book, and the philosophy that it espoused, became the cornerstone of Crowley's religion, Thelema.

In 1924, Crowley traveled to Tunisia for a magical retreat in Nefta, where he also wrote To Man (1924), a declaration of his own status as a prophet entrusted with bringing Thelema to humanity. Crowley believed that the twentieth century marked humanity's entry to the Aeon of Horus, a new era in which humans would take increasing control of their destiny. He believed that this Aeon follows on from the Aeon of Osiris, in which paternalistic religions like Christianity, Islam, and Buddhism dominated the world, and that this in turn had followed the Aeon of Isis, which was maternalistic and dominated by goddess worship. He believed that Thelema was the proper religion of the Aeon of Horus, and also deemed himself to be the prophet of this new Aeon.

Thelema revolves around the idea that human beings each have their own True Will that they should discover and pursue, and that this exists in harmony with the Cosmic Will that pervades the universe. Crowley referred to this process of searching and discovery of one's True Will to be "the Great Work" or the attaining of the "knowledge and conversation of the Holy Guardian Angel". His favoured method of doing so was through the performance of the Abramelin operation, a ceremonial magic ritual obtained from a 17th-century grimoire. The moral code of "Do What Thou Wilt" is believed by Thelemites to be the religion's ethical law, although the historian of religion Marco Pasi noted that this was not anarchistic or libertarian in structure, as Crowley saw individuals as part of a wider societal organism.

== Secular usage ==
The designation of "Victorian prophet" has been used in reference to cultural critics of the era, such as Thomas Carlyle and John Ruskin.

Commentators who suggest escalating crisis are often called prophets of doom.

Scientists analyzing data to forecast future events can also be considered prophets in a secular sense. In 2020, Ann Druyan stated that, "The only prophets that I’m really impressed by are the climate scientists of the past seventy years." She included her late husband, Carl Sagan, among the modern-day prophets, with the disclaimer that "[a] lot of the things that he speculated about haven’t turned out to be true, but all those people are human. They were just using their knowledge and their intelligence to make good guesses."

== See also ==
- Unfulfilled Watch Tower Society predictions
