= Commercial break (disambiguation) =

A commercial break is a section of advertising during or between television programs.

Commercial break may also refer to:

- Commercial Break, a 1997 Italian film
- Commercial Breaks, a 1994 studio album by Roy Harper
- Commercial Breakdown, a light entertainment program about humorous commercials
