= Wovoka =

19th and 20th-century founder of the Ghost Dance movement (c.1856–1932)

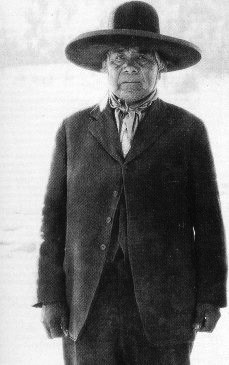
- Wovoka – Paiute spiritual leader and creator of the Ghost Dance

Northern Paiute leader

Personal details
- Born: Quoitze Ow c. 1856 Smith Valley, Nevada
- Died: September 20, 1932 (aged 75–76) Yerington, Nevada
- Resting place: Schurz, Nevada
- Parent: Tavibo (father)
- Known for: Spiritual leader and creator of the Ghost Dance
- Nickname: Jack Wilson

Wovoka (c. 1856 – September 20, 1932), also known as Jack Wilson, was the Paiute religious leader who founded a second episode of the Ghost Dance movement. Wovoka means "cutter" or "wood cutter" in the Northern Paiute language.

== Biography ==
Wovoka was born in the Smith Valley area southeast of Carson City, Nevada around 1856. Quoitze Ow was his birth name. Wovoka's father was Tavibo, who for several decades was incorrectly believed to be Wodziwob, a religious leader who had founded the Ghost Dance of 1870. From the age of eight until almost thirty Wovoka often worked for David Wilson, a rancher in the Yerington, Nevada, area, and his wife Abigail, who gave him the name Jack Wilson when dealing with Euro-Americans. David Wilson was a devout Christian, and Wovoka learned Christian theology and Bible stories while living with him.

One of his chief sources of authority among Paiutes was his alleged ability to control the weather. He was said to have caused a block of ice to fall out of the sky on a summer day, to be able to end drought with rain or snow, to light his pipe with the sun, and to form icicles in his hands.

Wovoka said he had a prophetic vision after falling into a coma during the solar eclipse of January 1, 1889. Wovoka's vision entailed the resurrection of the Paiute dead, and the removal of whites and their works from North America. Wovoka taught that to bring this vision to pass, the Native Americans must live righteously and perform a traditional round dance known as the Ghost Dance.

Wovoka's prophetic message referenced several Christian theological concepts. In the "Messiah Letters", Wovoka spoke of Jesus Christ's life on Earth and likened the foretold redemption of Native Americans to a biblical Judgement Day. Wovoka made references to the reunion of the living and the dead, and also advocated for non-violence in the Christian spirit of pacifism and fair temperament. The Ghost Dance embodied many of these Christian principles in its imagery and symbolism.

Anthropologists, historians, and theologians provide conflicting accounts of when and how Wovoka had his vision. One scholar of religions, Tom Thatcher, cites James Mooney's Smithsonian-sponsored anthropological report to claim that Wovoka received his first vision while chopping wood for David Wilson in 1887. Conversely, historian Paul Bailey utilized Mooney's work along with interviews with Wovoka's contemporaries and interpreters to assert that he received the vision after entering a two-day trance, awaking in tears. Regardless, shortly after receiving the vision and its message, it moved quickly beyond his local Paiute community by word of mouth to Native American tribes further east, notably the Lakota.

The Ghost Dance movement is known for being practiced by the victims of the Wounded Knee Massacre. Before the Ghost Dance reached Native Americans on South Dakota plains reservations, interest in the movement came from the U.S. Indian Office, the U.S. War Department, and multiple Native American tribal delegations. As the movement spread across the American West, various interpretations of Wovoka's original message were adopted, notably by the Lakota Sioux living on the Pine Ridge reservation. The Lakota interpretation was considered more militant, placing additional emphasis on the foretold elimination of White men. Although the Lakota interpretation promoted hostility toward US federal agents, it did not explicitly advocate for violent action. US authorities challenged the theological views of the Ghost Dance movement and arguably sought conflict with the Lakota tribe as a means of condemning these practices. Wovoka never left his home in Nevada to become an active participant in the dance's dissemination in the U.S. interior.

Indian Agents, soldiers, and other federal officials tended to have a hostile and sometimes violent attitude toward the movement.

== Post-Wounded Knee life and death ==
Wovoka was disheartened by how events unfolded at the massacre. He remained a prominent Native American leader until his death. Sometime between 1894 and 1896, he was reported to have been a sideshow attraction at a San Francisco Midwinter Fair Carnival. In 1917, an agent for the Nevada Agency named L.A. Dorrington tracked down Wovoka to report his whereabouts to Washington. Curious to see if the former Native American messiah had any ties to the Native American Church, Dorrington found that Wovoka was instead living a humble life in Mason, Nevada. He abstained from the practice, worked as an occasional medicine man, and traveled to events on reservations across the United States.

Wovoka died in Yerington on September 20, 1932, and is interred in the Paiute Cemetery in the town of Schurz, Nevada.

== See also ==
- Handsome Lake
- John Slocum
- Smohalla
- Native American temperance activists
