= Prophets in Ahmadiyya =

Ahmadiyya belief in the continuation of non-lawbearing prophethood

In Ahmadiyya theology, the view on the prophets of God (Arabic: نبي الله, romanized: Nabī-Allah) differs significantly from mainstream views of prophets in Islam. The main difference centres on the Quranic term Khatam an-Nabiyyin (خاتم النبيين, 'Seal of Prophets') with reference to Muhammad, which is understood by Ahmadis in terms of perfection and testification of prophethood instead of chronological finality (as understood within mainstream Islam). Accordingly, Muhammad is held to be the last prophet to deliver religious law to humanity (in the form of the Quran) whose teachings embody a perfected and universal message. Although, in principle, prophets can appear within Islam, they must be non-law-bearing prophets dependent on the Sharia of Muhammad. Their prophethood reflects that of Muhammad (that is, within his status as the living seal of the prophets), and their role is merely to revive and purify the faith. They cannot be prophets in their own right and cannot change, add to, or subtract from Islamic religious law. As such, Ahmadis regard their founder, Mirza Ghulam Ahmad (1835–1908), as a subordinate prophet who appeared as the promised Messiah and Mahdi in accordance with Islam's eschatological prophecies. In contrast to mainstream Muslims, who believe Jesus was raised to heaven and will return to earth towards the end of time, Ahmadis believe Jesus died a natural death and view the coming of such an independent, Israelite prophet (from outside the Islamic dispensation) to amount to breaking the Seal of Prophethood.

Moreover, unlike orthodox Islam, the Ahmadiyya Muslim Community considers the terms Messenger (rasul) and Prophet (nabi) as being different aspects of the same office of a Khalifatullah (Representative of God on Earth). According to Ahmadiyya belief, the terms used in the Qur'an to signify divinely appointed individuals, namely, Warner (Nazir), Prophet (Nabi), Messenger (Rasul), are generally synonymous. Ahmadis, however, categorize prophets as law-bearing and non-law-bearing.

== Definition ==
Ahmadis believe that when the world is filled with unrighteousness and immorality, or rather, when a specific part of the world displays these attributes, or when the followers of a certain law (religion) become corrupt or incorporate innovative and corrupted teachings into the faith (Bid‘ah), thus making the faith obsolete or in need of a ‘divine sustainer‘, then a prophet of God is sent to earth by God to re-establish his will, that is, for humans to worship him and to observe the rights of his creation.

Prophets, and the true followers of prophets, according to the Ahmadiyya Community have always faced severe opposition and often persecution, especially so in the country/society in which they brought forth their religious message. This is in accordance with the history of the prophets and also with the principle laid out in the Qur'an and parts of the Bible to this effect.

== Prophets as divine magnetizers ==
Prophets, according to the Ahmadiyya Community, inspire humans to such an extent that faith (eiman) translates into practical application of the faith (a'maal). The prophets 'magnetize' and draw humans towards them and as a result of this, true faith – that is, eiman with a'maal (practical application) – is established amongst their followers. It is written, however, that the 'magnetism' which draws forth people that a prophet displays is for a limited time because, within a somewhat long time period after they die, the magnetism that the prophet brought becomes less and less until it is absolutely non-existent. Thus, either God immediately appoints a Successor to the prophet (who may be a prophet himself) that has died or, after hundreds of years, when the magnetism is virtually non-existent, God sends forth another new messenger to display that magnetism once more. It is for this reason that, according to Ahmadiyya belief, followers of all faiths are not drawn to the magnetism of their founding prophets because that has become non-existent over time. This also applies, according to Ahmadiyya belief, to Orthodox Islam because it has been centuries since the founding prophet Muhammad died and centuries still since Muhammad's original Caliphate ceased to exist.

=== Caliphate ===
According to Ahmadiyya belief, Mirza Ghulam Ahmad, founder of the Ahmadiyya Community, was the promised messiah, sent by God as a prophet to bring back that magnetism that draws forth humans. After he died in 1908, his first successor was elected and up until today, this Ahmadiyya Caliphate has spanned over century, seen 5 Caliphs and is continuing, in the manner of the first 4 Caliphs of the Pious Caliphate of Muhammad. However, the Ahmadiyya Caliphate is seen as a re-establishment and continuation of the first Islamic Caliphate of Muhammad and the Ahmadiyya Caliphs as successors to the promised messiah as well as to Muhammad. The Rightly-Guided Caliphs of Islam (Pious Caliphs and Ahmadiyya Caliphs) are thought to be chosen by God through the agency of pious believers. The Rightly-Guided Caliphs are considered to be guided by God after their election to this office. Thus, the present Ahmadiyya Khalifa, Mirza Masroor Ahmad and also all other Ahmadiyya Khulafa are seen as successors of both the promised messiah and Muhammad, though human and in no way incarnations of God or any other status which would jeopardize the concept of the Unity of God (see: Non-divinity of Prophets). Though the caliphs, like the prophets, are deemed completely pure and sinless, much like in Shia Islam (see: ‘Isma), however, they, like prophets, are not deemed immune from making mistakes pertaining to worldly affairs of everyday life or human errors in judgement.

Ahmadiyya belief dictates that prophethood is Qudrat Al-Awwal or the ‘first manifestation of God's omnipotence and rightly-guided caliphate’ (usually taken to mean the Ahmadiyya Caliphate) is a form of Qudrat Ath-Thaani or the ‘second manifestation of God's omnipotence’. However, in no way does the Ahmadiyya Community deem the Ahmadiyya Caliphate to be better than the Pious Caliphate of Muhammad because it has spanned a longer time or seen more caliphs.

== Non-divinity of Prophets ==
The prophets of God are not seen as incarnations of God but are seen as mortal humans, as they have all died, according to Ahmadiyya belief (including Jesus, who according to Ahmadiyya belief died and his body is not currently in Heaven right now as according to Orthodox Islamic and Christian belief). Each messenger is seen to have been an ordinary human who displayed righteousness and honesty to a degree that was not found even remotely in his society of the time. Then, according to Ahmadiyya belief, God is thought to have selected this pious human and told him his divine station of prophethood. God would then, invest the Holy Spirit (Arabic: rohil-Quddos) within the newly appointed prophet and the prophet would become a ‘manifestation of God‘, though still a human being and not divine in his own right. Prophets are not regarded as God, God's sons, incarnations of God, or in any other way which would put the unity of God, the concept of Islamic (tawhid) or the declaration of faith in jeopardy. The first part of the shahadah, the essential declaration of a Muslim, states: "There is no god but Allah" and another version of the same is "There is none worthy of worship except Allah". The word Allah, according to Ahmadiyya belief, is a personal name of God, is a proper noun and is not a combination or a derivative of any other Arabic words. The second caliph of the Ahmadiyya Movement made this abundantly clear in his ground-breaking commentary of the Qur'an. He writes: "In the Arabic language, the word Allah is never used for any other thing or being. No other language has a distinctive name for the Supreme Being. The names found in other languages are all attributive or descriptive and are often used in the plural, but the word 'Allah' is never used in the plural number. It is a simple substantive, not derived. It is never used as a qualifying word."

== Reflections of divine attributes ==
Although Prophets are regarded as human beings, they are seen as having attained the highest rank of spirituality among all humans. According to the Ahmadiyya Community, only in spirituality (literally, "Nearness to God") does one deserve any honour and that also usually only by God Himself and thus racism, sexism, nationalism and other ideologies such as these are condemned by the Ahmadiyya Community. The Prophets are seen to have resisted and overcome Satan, which is either Satan taking a corporeal form and inviting them to evil or the metaphorical Satan which is the base desires of humans (i.e. wealth, fame, lust, greed etc.). The purpose of life, according to the Ahmadiyya Community, and in principle with the Qur'an, is to worship God. This worship is in two parts:

1.) Direct Prayer with God to establish communion with Him, Zikr-Illahi (Remembrance of God) and other spiritual exercises.

2.) Service to humanity. As humans are the creatures of God, service to them means that you are in part worshipping God. This service may be on any scale, from being polite or holding the door for people, to being a doctor or establishing/donating to a large humanitarian relief organization. The only way to worship God completely is the way that He has told. Thus God sends prophets to ease this task for humans because they are seen as representatives of God on Earth. According to Ahmadiyya belief, out of all Prophets which are representatives of God, Muhammad reflected God's commandments perfectly and was the "Seal of the Prophets" as described in the Qur'an.

=== Ahmadiyya writings ===
The Review of Religions, a magazine started by Ahmad, founder of the Ahmadiyya Community, to promote inter-faith dialogue and guide seekers of the truth, which is the longest running Ahmadi English language magazine in the world, elaborates in the Prospectus of its first issue under its first volume (1902) and gives a short overview of the points above concerning Prophets being 'Manifestations of God' and 'Divine Magnetizers'. The Non-Divinity of Prophets, the Mirror Analogy, Sun and Lake Analogy and Prophets as the Reflection of Divine Attributes: "…how to be enfranchised from the bondage of sin, and how to get out of the impurities of life? There is only one answer to this all-important question. Such a regeneration can only be effected by the one who comes with a magnetism from heaven, who on account of the extreme purity of his soul and the surpassing cleanliness of his heart is metaphorically called a Manifestation of God."

"He (the Prophet) removes the poisonous matters, gives the elixir vitae in their stead, burns the carnal passions and low motives of worldly life and ennobles the soul with the pure and exalted divine morals."

"Look at the sun and the moon: each new day requires a new appearance of the glorious orb of light."

"The holy one that rose in the days of Pilate among the Jews (Jesus) was, no doubt, a sun of righteousness, but only so long as his magnetism attracted the hearts and his light worked a heavenly transformation in the souls of his followers. He is now a sun but one that has passed below the horizon. The radiant light which shone from his face and the brilliant luster which he cast around him is shorn of its beams and grown quite obscure, not the least trace of it being visible among those that call themselves after his name."

"The holy one that sheds such light is not and cannot be God, but there is no doubt that he is one with God (this is in accordance with John 10:30 of the Bible where Jesus stated 'I and the Father are one') and his soul is in constant and close communion with God. He is the fountainhead of the divine powers, and the rare and hidden manifestations of the powers of the Almighty which are not generally disclosed, are revealed through him. Such persons are called the manifestations, 'incarnations' and representatives of God. In the manifestation of the divine powers they sit on the throne of God's glory.". This is however against the Islamic belief as God is One and there is none like Him and no one can share His Attributes.

"God is One and without any partner or rival, but persons of this type, the elect of God, whom the world has seen, may be counted by thousands. We may see a single face reflected in a thousand looking-glasses, and yet there are not really a thousand faces but only one face of which there are so many reflections. This world is a grand reflector; in other words, it is a place of glasses for the reflection of the 'face' of God and the face of Satan. God, so to speak, stands against some of the mirrors and therefore the 'image' of God is seen in them. Against others, Satan makes his appearance and his likeness is consequently witnessed in them. But from these reflections it should not be imagined that the images are so many different gods. There are thousands of the Manifestations of God, and thousands of those of the Devil."

"God made Adam in His image and after His likeness, and the Prince of the Devils manifested himself in the person of Cain. The manifestations of the Deity and the Devil have since then been appearing in the world…".

Even though man is made in the best shape, believing that God is like a human being is against the Islamic beliefs as God can not be imagined and He is beyond human comprehension and His Attributes can not be shared with anyone. Believing otherwise would be going against the fundamental beliefs in Islam of God is One, associating no one with Him and that no one can obtain His Unique Power and Attributes.

"Every age stands in need of new light and a new representative. Whenever this light grows dim in a people and the influence of a heavenly magnetizer is not felt among them, they bend down solely to the Earth and its mean cares. They are carried away by the current of carnal desires and drown in a flood of sins and impurities, unable to get out of it. History bears strong evidence to it."

== Prophet's relation to Divine Scriptures ==
God would, according to Ahmadiyya belief, reveal the Prophet some knowledge of the unseen if He so wills, tell the Prophet to project his message across the people of his society, tell the Prophet to establish a gathering of his followers and continuously give the Prophet revelation expressing His Divine Will. Some, most or all of the revelation given to a Prophet is sometimes recorded as a Holy Scripture and thus, Ahmadis also believe in all those Books regarded as such, i.e. the Bible, Avesta, Torah, Qur'an etc. Ahmadiyya belief states that some original Holy Scriptures such as the Scrolls of Abraham, are not to be found in contemporary times and that all Holy Scriptures, have undergone some form of interpolation or extraction by the followers of each independent faith and thus they are not reliable today as they were when they were first revealed. Only the Qur'an has not undergone any interpolation/corruption and it is the same book in its entirety exactly as it was when it was revealed to Muhammad. It is labeled, like Muhammad's status of "Seal of the Prophets" as the "Seal of the Books" (Arabic: Khatam-ul-Kutub).

== Law-bearing and non law-bearing Prophets ==
Prophets are divided into either 'law-bearing' or 'non law-bearing' categories. Law-bearing Prophets are known as those Prophets/Messengers that brought forth a new revelation by God, and a new Holy Scripture, thus often making the previous religion obsolete. Their laws, though essentially all part of the One and only religion by God, Islam, are suited for the specific time, place and societal needs of their independent civilizations. Thus, they would differ in minor details but remain with the essential principles of the One World Religion, Islam, that are, Unity and worship of God and service to humanity and/or all life on Earth. Noah, Moses and Muhammad are examples of Law-bearing Prophets. Non law-bearing Prophets/Messengers do not bring forth any new revelation but are followers of a previous revelation given by a Law-bearing Prophet. They are usually Successors (Arabic: Khulafa) of the previous Law-bearing Prophets in which they follow. Sometimes, they are not Successors of previous Prophets and are thus just contemporaries of Law-Bearing Prophets. The Prophets of the Old Testament (David, Solomon etc.) are examples of Successor-Prophets of Moses and follow his Mosaic Law. Hud, a Prophet mentioned exclusively in the Qur'an, is an example of a contemporary Law-bearing Prophet, who in this case is Noah.

== Religious evolution ==
The Ahmadiyya Writings reveal that Prophets have always been sent by God in the past to all nations of the world, as part of the single religion from God, which is Islam. Religion is taught to be progressive and the Prophets reveal teachings either more advanced than their preceding religions or suited for each specific time, place and society. If one were to strip all religions of their innovative teachings, one would find that they are all essentially identical, according to Ahmadiyya belief. All religions, according to the Ahmadiyya teaching of the evolution of religion, were part of Islam and were revealed in parts like pieces of a jigsaw puzzle. But then, according to Ahmadiyya belief, God fully revealed the whole of Islam, in its perfect form, to Muhammad. Islam was thus called the 'Seal of the Religions' (Arabic: Khatam-ud-Din) just as Muhammad was called "Seal of the Prophets". One of the earliest recorded expressions of this religious perennialism is found in the Bhagavad-Gita, which the Ahmadiyya Community acknowledges as of Divine origin: "I come, and go, and come. When Righteousness declines, O Bharata! When Wickedness is strong, I rise, from age to age, and take visible shape, and move a man with men, succouring the good, thrusting the evil back, and setting Virtue on her seat again." (Bhagavad-Gita, Chapter IV)

== Prophets as celestial beings ==
"We have adorned the lowest heaven with an adornment – the planets." (37:7)

"And We have, indeed, made mansions of stars in the heaven and have adorned it for beholders." (15:17)

"Blessed is He Who has made in the heaven mansions of the stars and has placed therein a Lamp producing light and a moon that reflects light." (25:62)

"…And He created the sun and the moon and the stars – all made subservient by His command…" (7:55)

The above verses of the Qur'an, according to the Ahmadiyya Community, have many interpretations, one in which the verses reveal key astronomical knowledge about the stars, planets and other celestial bodies. Another interpretation of these verses (and the one used for the subject at hand) made by the Ahmadis is that the universe is the 'spiritual universe', the celestial beings (i.e. stars, planets, etc.) as the Prophets, the sun as Muhammad and the moon as Ahmad.

The moon is taken to be Ahmad because in every verse above where the moon is signified, the word Qamar is used and that word distinctly means Full Moon (see: 'Moon of the Prophets' below).

"By the heaven having mansions of stars. And the Promised Day, And the Witness and he to whom witness is borne." (85:2-4)

According to the Ahmadiyya interpretation of the above verse, the stars signify Prophets and the 'Promised Day' as the day of the coming of Ahmad (it is also interpreted as the Day of Resurrection). The Witness in this verse signifies Ahmad as he was a Shahid (Witness) as all other Prophets were and was a witness to the truth of the 'one to whom witness is borne' in this verse, or Muhammad as he was a Mashhud (One to whom witness is made) as all other prophets were.

Rejection of even one of the Prophets, results in the rejection of all prophets, according to the Ahmadiyya Community.

=== Seal of the Prophets ===
The Qur'an refers to Muhammad as the "Seal of the Prophets" (Arabic: Khatam-un-Nabiyeen). In the Qur'an, he is also known by the term Khatam-ul-Mursaleen (Seal of the Envoys). Muslims take this to mean that Muhammad was the final Prophet and that no prophet after him would be able to come at all. Ahmadis interpret this differently. According to Ahmadiyya belief, Muhammad is the "Seal of the Prophets" in that his law, as opposed to the nationalist laws of the preceding Prophets, was not aimed at a specific part of the world but to all of mankind, as according to the Qur'an: "And We have sent thee (Muhammad) not but as a mercy for all peoples." (21:108). Thus, Muhammad was the most perfect Prophet out of all Prophets, and his law, Islam, was perfect. All religions, according to the Ahmadiyya teaching of the evolution of religion, were part of Islam and were revealed in parts like pieces of a jigsaw puzzle. But then, according to Ahmadiyya belief, God fully revealed the whole of Islam to Muhammad. This religion was to be the final religion for humans on Earth, chosen by God to establish His Unity. According to Ahmadiyya belief, thus, non law-bearing prophets may come after Muhammad but only if they follow his final law of Islam.

== Prophets sent to all nations ==
See also Criteria of True Prophet

A Hadith of Muhammad states that "124,000 Prophets" came before his advent . This is in accordance with many Qur'anic verses, namely: "And there is no people to whom a Warner (Nazir) has not been sent." (35:25), "And there is a guide for every people." (13:8), "There are no people (in the world) to whom We have not sent a Warner." (32:25). Each prophet brought forth a message suited for his own societal needs, time period and specific place on Earth, i.e. it is inconceivable that an Australian at the time of Moses be a Jew. This is also in accordance with the Qur'anic verse: "And We sent Messengers before thee among parties of ancient peoples." (15:11). In accordance with this Qur'anic principle, there is the following verse of the Qur'an: "We sent some Messengers whom We have already mentioned to thee and some Messengers whom We have not mentioned to thee" (4:165). Thus, as the Qur'an only mentions 24 Prophets, these Prophets whom God has not mentioned in the Qur'an, according to the Ahmadiyya Community, would be the Prophets of the Bible not mentioned in the Qur'an and the Founders of the World Religions and other religious personages sent throughout the world. Mirza Basheer-ud-Din Mahmood Ahmad, who is called The Promised Son by Ahmadis, was also the Second Khalifa-tul-Masih of the Ahmadiyya Community writes: "According to this teaching there has not been a single people at any time in history or anywhere in the world who have not had a warner from God, a teacher, a prophet. According to the Holy Qur'an there have been prophets at all times and in all countries. India, China, Russia, Afghanistan, parts of Africa, Europe, America - all had prophets according to the theory of divine guidance taught by the Holy Qur'an. When, therefore, Muslims hear about prophets of other peoples or other countries, they do not deny them. They do not brand them as liars. Muslims believe that other peoples have had their teachers. If other peoples have had prophets, books, and laws, these constitute no difficulty for Islam." Ahmad, founder of the Ahmadiyya Community wrote in his book A Message of Peace:

"Our God has never discriminated between one people and another. This is illustrated by the fact that all the potentials and capabilities (Prophets) which have been granted to the Aryans (Hindus) have also been granted to the races inhabiting Arabia, Persia, Syria, China, Japan, Europe and America."

Mirza Ghulam Ahmad also wrote within the same book:

"God also made it clear in several places in the Holy Qur'an that His Messengers have been appearing in different lands all over the world. In fact He did not neglect any people or any country."

== Unity of Prophethood ==
All prophets are regarded as the One and of having the same essential message and disbelief in one of the Prophets is tantamount to disbelief in all of the Prophets. "We make no distinction between any of His Messengers." (2:286) Sometimes, however, Prophets are ranked higher or lower than other ones, as shown in the Qur'an: "These Messengers have We exalted some of them above others; among them there are those whom Allah spoke; and some of them He exalted in degrees of rank..." (2:253)

== See also ==
- Khatam an-Nabiyyin
