= Loony on the Bus =

Studio album by Roy Harper
- Released: 1988
- Recorded: England
- Genre: Rock
- Length: 44:15
- Label: Awareness AWCD 1011, Rough Trade CD10-261 (Germany)
- Producer: Roy Harper

Roy Harper chronology
Descendants of Smith (1988)	Loony on the Bus (1988)	Once (1990)

Professional ratings
Review scores
Source	Rating
Allmusic	3/5 stars

Loony on the Bus is the 15th studio album by Roy Harper and was released in 1988 when Harper required cash in order to start his own company. These demos finally served their purpose by funding Harper's 1990 album Once.

== History ==
The album is mostly a collection of demos and tracks originally intended for release in 1978-9 under the title Commercial Breaks. The original release was held back because of disputes between Harper and EMI over funding and content and resultantly, it was not until the release of Loony on the Bus in 1988 that most of the tracks became publicly available.

Seven songs are taken from the original track listing for Commercial Breaks (tracks: 1,2,3,6,9,10,& 11), two songs still remain exclusive to this release (tracks 5 & 8), and two tracks (4 & 7) though exclusive at the time of release, would later be released as bonus tracks on the eventual 1994 CD release of Commercial Breaks.

The album's title was inspired by a review of one of Harper's earlier albums in a women's magazine. The reviewer stated that Harper reminded her of "...the loony on the bus".

== Track listing ==
All tracks credited to Roy Harper

1. "No Change (Ten Years Ago)" – (3:21) (from Commercial Breaks)
2. "Sail Away" – (4:47) (from Commercial Breaks)
3. "I Wanna Be Part of the News" – (3:34) (from Commercial Breaks)
4. "Burn the World (Part 1)" – (5:04)
5. "Casualty" – (3:55) (exclusive to this release)
6. "Cora" – (3:23) (from Commercial Breaks)
7. "Playing Prisons" – (4:11)
8. "Loony on the Bus" – (3:49) (exclusive to this release)
9. "Come Up and See Me" – (4:21) (from Commercial Breaks)
10. "The Flycatcher" – (3:55) (from Commercial Breaks)
11. "Square Boxes" – (4:01) (from Commercial Breaks)

== Personnel ==
- Roy Harper – guitar and vocals
- John Leckie – sound engineer
- Dave Cochran
- John Halsey – guitar
- David Lawson – keyboards
- Henry McCullough
- Andy Roberts
