= Wodziwob =

Religious leader and medicine man (died c. 1872)

- Died: c. 1872
- Citizenship: Paiute
- Known for: Founded Ghost Dance of 1869

Wodziwob (died c. 1872) was a Paiute prophet and medicine man who is believed to have led the first Ghost Dance ceremonies, in what is now Nevada, sometime around 1869.

== Vision, prophecy, and dances ==
In 1869, when living in the Walker Lake Valley of Nevada, Wodziwob stated he had a series of visions while on a mountain.

The first vision proclaimed that "within a few moons there was to be a great upheaval or earthquake... [during which] the improvements of the whites-all their houses, their goods, stores, etc.-would remain, but the whites would be swallowed up, while the Indians would be saved and permitted to enjoy the earth and all the fullness thereof, including anything left by the wicked whites". The prediction of this selective earthquake was met with skepticism.

After a second trip to the mountain, Wodziwob received a new prophecy that stated that all peoples would be swallowed by the earthquakes, and after a few days the Native Americans would return to the world, now a paradise, while the whites would be destroyed. As the time period for the predicted earthquakes began to pass, many became disenchanted with Wodziwob's prophecies.

This prompted him to make a third trip to the mountain, where it was revealed to him that those "who believed in the prophecy would be resurrected and be happy, but those who did not believe in it would stay in the ground and be damned forever with the whites". An additional prophecy stating that a train carrying the dead would come from the east within four years is also attributed to Wodziwob (although this may have been a later addition by his disciple, Weneyuga). By the time of Wodziwob's death around 1872, he had apparently removed the destruction of whites from his prophecy, replacing it with the idea that all were to be granted eternal life with no racial distinction being made.

Weneyuga would spread the prophecy of Wodziwob for several years after Wodziwob's death, but after the failure of the train to restore the dead within four years, he essentially retired and became a respected medicine man until his death in the 1910s, with the majority of direct activities centered on Wodziwob's message not surviving the 1870s.

One of his followers may have been Tavibo, who for several decades was incorrectly identified as being the same man as Wodziwob. Numu-tibo'o was the father of Wovoka, who re-introduced his version of the Ghost Dance in 1890. It is Wovoka's message and leadership that gained popularity, followers, and which is largely meant when modern people refer to "the Ghost Dance".
