= Tavibo =

Northern Paiute shaman

- Died: between 1912 and 1915; Lyon County, Nevada, U.S.
- Occupation: Shaman
- Spouse: Tiya
- Children: 3 (including Wovoka)

Tavibo (died between 1912 and 1915), also known as Numu-tibo'o, was a Northern Paiute shaman. Resisting the increase in White settlers, he was a prophet who told his followers that these settlers would be purged in disasters while the Native Americans survived. He was also originally credited with starting the 1870 Ghost Dance, but the evidence for this has been refuted.

== Biography ==
Tavibo, a Northern Paiute, was born three decades before Smith Valley and Mason Valley—both in Lyon County, Nevada—were settled by Whites, and he was raised in the foraging lifestyle. According to James Mooney, his name Tavibo came from the Northern Paiute word for White people, taivo. He is also known as Numu-tibo'o, (Note: Sources differ on the spelling: Numuraivo (which, according to Hittman, Tavibo is nowadays remembered by local settlers' descendants as), Numuraivo'o, and Numu-tibo'o.) meaning "[Northern Paiute] people-White man"; in his book Wovoka and the Ghost Dance, Michael Hittman said that this nickname may have originated from experiences as a prisoner of war following the American Indian Wars (including the Owens Valley Indian War). He was also known by local settlers under the name "Buckskin".

Tavibo was among several Northern Paiutes who resisted the rise of White settlers in the Old West, resisting pressure against his cultural ways and maintaining his traditional nature as a shaman instead of becoming a wage laborer. The settlers reportedly had a hostile attitude towards him, with some saying that he would steal things; however at least one grandson-in-law recalled him as "a wonderful man ... someone who stopped his people from killing the settlers", and Hittman interpreted him as "a proud culture-bearer, a traditionalist".

Reportedly visiting the mountains to meditate, Tavibo promoted two prophecies that separate disasters would purge the settlers while sparing the Native Americans, and after losing followers, a third where only his prophecy cultists would survive. His cult also had Shoshone and Bannock followers in addition to Northern Paiutes. Settlers described him as a "real prophet [who] could make it rain, etc." as well as a shaman who avoided punishment for losing patients; Hittman compared Corbett Mack's claims that his paternal aunt was unsuccessfully subject to Tavibo's rites to a witchcraft accusation.

Tavibo was initially credited with starting the 1870 Ghost Dance, with Mooney stating that "Waughzeewaughber" was an alternate name of Tavibo. However, subsequent findings by Cora Du Bois and Hittman showed that a different person, Wodziwob, was the founder, though Tavibo himself was widely acknowledged as an adherent of Wodziwob's. His son Wovoka would later start the 1890 Ghost Dance, with Tavibo's rites being credited as an influence on the rite.

Despite being once implied to have practiced polygamy with three wives, Tavibo is recalled by settler descendants to have had just one Northern Paiute wife named Tiya, with whom he had three sons. He lived in valley regions nearby the Sierra Nevada for four decades, including on the Wilson Ranch located at the northern entrance of Wilson Canyon.

At one point between 1912 and 1915, Tavibo died at his home near Mason, Nevada, within Lyon County, and was buried in an unmarked grave.
