= The Green Man (album) =

Studio album by Roy Harper
- Released: September 1, 2000
- Recorded: Ireland
- Genre: Rock
- Length: 59:58
- Label: Science Friction HUCD033
- Producer: Jeff Martin, Roy Harper

Roy Harper chronology
The Dream Society (1998)	The Green Man (2000)	Man and Myth (2013)

Professional ratings
Review scores
Source	Rating
Allmusic	4/5 stars

The Green Man was released in 2000 and is the 21st studio album by Roy Harper.

== History ==
The album takes its name from an ancient character / representation found, principally, throughout Western Europe. The Green Man may be carved in stone or wood, found in churches, or painted on pub signage and is usually a representation of a face surrounded by (or made from) leaves. Harper's face can also be seen within the leaves upon the album's cover.

Canadian musician Jeff Martin plays a variety of instruments on eight of the album's eleven songs.

I had an idea to keep this record purely acoustic. I succeeded in the main. The only non-acoustic instrument is John Fitzgerald's Fender Rhodes sound on "The Monster". I felt like I wanted to go back to my real roots. It did me good. I decided not to have bass and drums as such. Not because I've become anti rhythm section or anything stupid, but because I needed to get nearer to the real heart of me. I recorded the songs entirely alone other than when Jeff (Martin) was in the studio. (14 days). Jeff gave me a hand when it came to recording his bits. I particularly like his mandolin on "Sexy Woman". Jeff brought 2 items into the place. A great heart: and complete chaos. We had quite a time...

== Track listing ==
All tracks credited to Roy Harper except "The Apology" - Jeff Martin / Roy Harper

1. "The Green Man" – 5:35
2. "Wishing Well" – 5:53
3. "Sexy Woman" – 6:30
4. "The Apology" – 2:58
5. "Midnight Sun" – 4:22
6. "Glasto" – 4:24
7. "The Monster" – 8:22
8. "New England" – 4:42
9. "Solar Wind Sculptures" – 3:36
10. "Rushing Camelot" – 8:46
11. "All in All" – 4:50

== Personnel ==
- Roy Harper – guitar and vocals, left shaker
- Jeff Martin – hurdy-gurdy, 12 string slide. electric guitar. mandolin, recorder, bongos, tambourine, right shaker, guitar, 6 string, slide guitar
- John Fitzgerald – keyboard
- Paddy Keenan – uilleann pipes, low D whistle
- Colm O'Sullivan – mandolin, recorder, low D whistle
- Chris Thorpe – mastering
- Harry Pearce – cover design
