= The Dream Society =

Studio album by Roy Harper
- Released: 1998
- Recorded: Ireland
- Genre: Rock
- Length: 72:51
- Label: Science Friction HUCD030
- Producer: Roy Harper

Roy Harper chronology
Poems, Speeches, Thoughts and Doodles (1997)	The Dream Society (1998)	The Green Man (2000)

Professional ratings
Review scores
Source	Rating
Allmusic	4/5 stars

The Dream Society is the 20th studio album by Roy Harper, released in 1998.

== History ==
The songs on the album revolve around events in Harper's life, from the early death of his mother to reaching the age of fifty. Other important events covered include the demise of his marriage, heartbreak, his experiences with drugs, psychological issues, and aspirations for humankind. Originally titled 'The Seven Ages Of Man', then 'Songs Of Love' it was finally released as 'thedreamsociety'.

Early pressings of this album (the first 3,000?) contain a bonus CD featuring excerpts from the album with comments from Harper. (Science Friction HUCD30A). A promotional sampler with slightly different comments was also released. (Science Friction HUCD100).

== Track listing ==
All tracks credited to Roy Harper

1. "Songs of Love" – 6:59
2. "Songs of Love (Pt 2)" – 4:50
3. "Dancing All the Night" – 6:12
4. "Psychopath" – 2:45
5. "I Want to Be in Love" – 5:58
6. "Drugs for Everybody" – 5:04
7. "Come the Revolution" – 6:09
8. "Angel of the Night" – 5:10
9. "The Dream Society" – 8:35
10. "Broken Wing" – 6:42
11. "These Fifty Years" – 14:27

=== Limited Edition Bonus CD (HUCD030A) ===
1. "The Dream Society" (full version) – 8:16
2. "Songs Of Love" (spoken introduction) – 1:08
3. "Songs Of Love" (excerpt) – 1:10
4. "Songs Of Love (Part 2)" (spoken introduction) – 0:47
5. "Songs Of Love (Part 2)" (excerpt) – 1:03
6. "Dancing All The Night" (spoken introduction) – 1:34
7. "Dancing All The Night" (excerpt) – 1:02
8. "Psychopath" (excerpt) – 0:56
9. "Psychopath" (spoken introduction) – 1:49
10. "I Want To Be In Love" (spoken introduction) – 0:21
11. "I Want To Be In Love" (excerpt) – 1:20
12. "Drugs For Everybody" (spoken introduction) – 1:38
13. "Drugs For Everybody" (excerpt) – 0:54
14. "Come The Revolution" (spoken introduction) – 1:25
15. "Come The Revolution" (excerpt) – 0:57
16. "Angel Of The Night" (spoken introduction) – 0:23
17. "Angel Of The Night" (excerpt) – 1:18
18. "The Dream Society" (spoken introduction) – 3:27
19. "Broken Wing" (spoken introduction) – 0:47
20. "Broken Wing" (excerpt) – 1:13
21. "These Fifty Years" (spoken introduction) – 2:26
22. "These Fifty Years" (excerpt) – 1:26

=== Promotional Sampler CD (HUCD100) ===
1. "The Dream Society" (full version) – 8:16
2. "Songs Of Love" (spoken introduction) – 1:16
3. "Songs Of Love" (excerpt) – 1:08
4. "Songs Of Love" (Part 2) (spoken introduction) – 0:54
5. "Songs Of Love" (Part 2) (excerpt) – 1:03
6. "Dancing All The Night" (spoken introduction) – 0:45
7. "Dancing All The Night" (excerpt) – 1:00
8. "Psychopath" (excerpt) – 0:56
9. "Psychopath" / "I Want To Be In Love" (spoken introduction) – 1:16
10. "I Want To Be In Love" (excerpt) – 1:21
11. "Drugs For Everybody" (spoken introduction) – 0:30
12. "Drugs For Everybody" (excerpt) – 0:54
13. "Come The Revolution" (spoken introduction) – 0:16
14. "Come The Revolution" (excerpt) – 0:57
15. "Angel Of The Night" (spoken introduction) – 0:25
16. "Angel Of The Night" (excerpt) – 1:15
17. "The Dream Society" (spoken introduction) – 1:02
18. "Broken Wing" (excerpt) – 1:10
19. "Broken Wing" (spoken introduction) – 0:04
20. "These Fifty Years" (spoken introduction) – 3:30
21. "These Fifty Years" (excerpt) – 1:29

== Personnel ==
- Roy Harper – acoustic guitar (tuned down to C), vocals, tambourine and washboard
- Ian Anderson – flute
- Steve Barnard – drums and percussion
- Noel Barrett – bass
- John Fitzgerald – keyboard, piano, Hammond, trumpets, concertina and harp
- Nick Harper – acoustic guitar, slide (slide guitar?) on 7 and electric guitar
- Felix Howard – original bass
- Misumi Kosaka – vocals
- Colm O'Sullivan – additional keyboard
- Ric Sanders – violins
- Bonnie Shaljean – harp
- Jeff Ward – slide guitar and bass on 4, hand drums at end 11, mandolin, percussion Bits and everything else.
- John Leckie – original recording
- Jeff Ward – subsequent recording
- George Fort – cover art paintings and drawings
- Harry Pearce – Idea for Front cover art
