= Commercial Breaks =

Studio album by Roy Harper
- Released: 1994
- Recorded: England
- Genre: Rock
- Length: 47:51
- Label: Harvest SHSP 4077 (Unreleased); Science Friction HUCD016
- Producer: Roy Harper

Roy Harper chronology
Death or Glory? (1992)	Commercial Breaks (1994)	Poems, Speeches, Thoughts and Doodles (1997)

Professional ratings
Review scores
Source	Rating
AllMusic	3/5 stars
Music Week	3/5 stars

Commercial Breaks, provisionally entitled 'Commercial Breaks' (doesn't it?), is the 18th studio album by Roy Harper. It was recorded in 1977, intended for release in 1978/79, but not officially released in its entirety until 1994.

== History ==
A dispute between EMI and Harper over funding and content prevented the planned release of this album (Harvest (SHSP 4077)) though a few test pressings do exist. Of the originally intended ten songs, seven were eventually released on the 1988 Awareness Records release Loony on the Bus (AWCD1011). One track, "Sail Away", was released in advance as a single at the time of the release of Bullinamingvase (1977), the single's label noting that it was "Taken from the new LP "Commercial Breaks"", Harper's proposed next album.

The 1994 Science Friction release (HUCD016), included the original track listing plus two bonus tracks, (both previously released on Loony on the Bus) i.e. "Burn The World (Part 1)" and "Playing Prisons". Three of the album's songs ("I'm In Love With You", "Ten Years Ago" and "The Flycatcher") were re-recorded for Harper's 1980 release, The Unknown Soldier.

The album cover features logos, products and advertising, primarily from television commercials of the era. Most visible are the Smash Martian, Honey Monster, Michelin Man and a large pack of Wrigleys gum.

The band on this record were known as Black Sheep and included Andy Roberts, Henry McCullough, Dave Lawson, Dave Cochran and John Halsey. Dave Cochran was a member of Trigger, which was the band that made HQ.

== Track listing ==
All tracks credited to Roy Harper

=== Unreleased album ===
==== Side One ====
1. "My Little Girl" – 2:36
2. "I'm In Love With You" – 4:07
3. "Ten Years Ago" – 3:19
4. "Sail Away" – 4:49
5. "I Wanna Be Part of the News" – 3:32

==== Side Two ====
1. "Cora" – 3:26
2. "Come Up and See Me" – 4:21
3. "The Flycatcher" – 3:55
4. "Too Many Movies" – 4:14
5. "Square Boxes" – 4:04

=== 1994 CD release ===
1. "My Little Girl" – 2:36
2. "I'm In Love With You" – 4:07
3. "Ten Years Ago" – 3:19
4. "Sail Away" – 4:49
5. "I Wanna Be Part of the News" – 3:32
6. "Cora" – 3:26
7. "Come Up and See Me" – 4:21
8. "The Flycatcher" – 3:55
9. "Too Many Movies" – 4:14
10. "Square Boxes" – 4:04
11. "Burn The World" (Part 1) – 5:06 (from Loony on the Bus)
12. "Playing Prisons" – 4:22 (from Loony on the Bus)

== Personnel ==
- Roy Harper – guitar and vocals
- John Leckie – sound engineer
- Dave Cochrane – bass guitar
- John Halsey – drums
- Dave Lawson – keyboards
- Henry McCullough – electric guitar
- Andy Roberts – guitars
