= Ghost Dance =

Native American religious movement

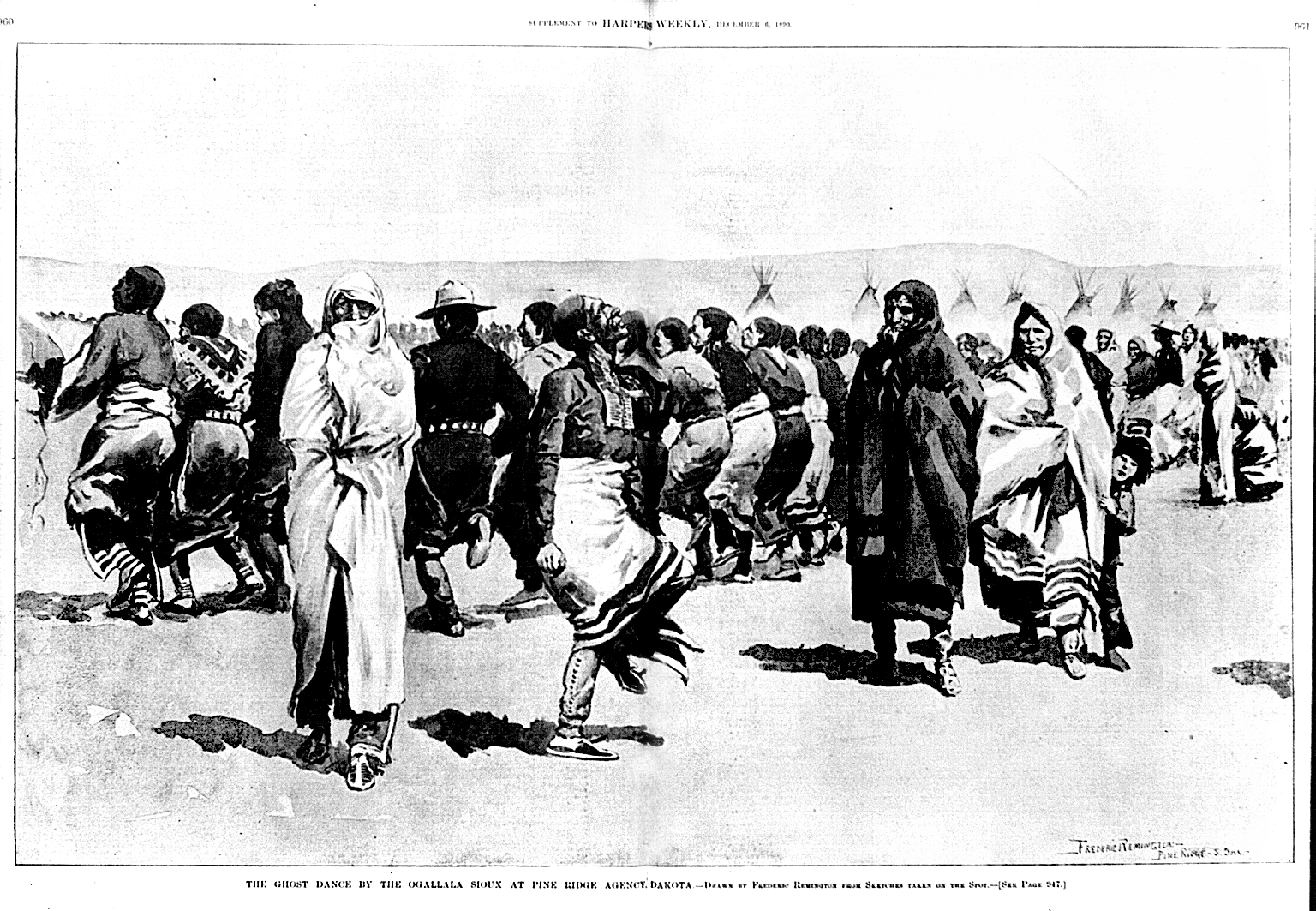
The Ghost Dance of 1889–1891, depicting the Oglala at Pine Ridge Indian Reservation in South Dakota, by Frederic Remington in 1890

The Ghost Dance (Caddo: Nanissaanah, also called the Ghost Dance of 1890) is a ceremony incorporated into numerous Native American belief systems. According to the millenarian teachings of the Northern Paiute spiritual leader Wovoka, renamed Jack Wilson, proper practice of the dance would reunite the living with spirits of the dead, bring the spirits to fight on their behalf, end American Westward expansion, and bring peace, prosperity, and unity to Native American peoples throughout the region.

The basis for the Ghost Dance is the circle dance, a traditional Native American dance which involves moving in a circular formation in large groups. The Ghost Dance was first practiced by the Nevada Northern Paiute in 1889. The practice swept throughout much of the Western United States, quickly reaching areas of California and Oklahoma. As the Ghost Dance spread from its original source, different tribes syncretized selective aspects of the ritual with their own beliefs.

The Ghost Dance has been associated with Wovoka's prophecy of an end to colonial expansion while preaching goals of clean living, an honest life, and cross-cultural cooperation by Native Americans. Practice of the Ghost Dance movement was believed to have contributed to Lakota resistance to assimilation under the Dawes Act. The Lakota variation on the Ghost Dance tended to be directed towards millenarianism, an innovation that distinguished the Lakota interpretation from Jack Wilson's original teachings. The Caddo still practice the Ghost Dance today.

== History ==
=== Paiute influence ===
The Northern Paiutes living in Mason Valley, in what became the U.S. state of Nevada, were known collectively as the Tövusidökadö (lit. 'grass bulb eaters') at the time of European contact. The Northern Paiute community at this time was thriving upon a subsistence pattern of fishing, hunting wild game, and foraging for pine nuts and roots.

The Tövusidökadö tended to follow various spiritual leaders and community organizers. Community events centered on the observance of seasonal ceremonies such as harvests or hunting. In 1869, Hawthorne Wodziwob, a Paiute man, organized a series of community dances to announce a vision. He spoke of a journey to the land of the dead and of promises made to him by the souls of the recently deceased. They promised to return to their loved ones within a period of three to four years.

Wodziwob's peers accepted this vision, likely due to his reputable status as a healer. He urged the populace to dance the common circle dance as was customary during a time of celebration. He continued preaching this message for three years with the help of a local "weather doctor" named Tavibo, father of Wovoka.

Prior to Wodziwob's religious movement, a devastating typhoid fever epidemic struck in 1867. This and other diseases more common among the European population killed approximately one-tenth of the total population, resulting in widespread psychological and emotional trauma. The disruption brought disorder to the economic system and society. Many families were prevented from continuing their nomadic lifestyle.

=== Round Dance influence ===
A round dance is a circular community dance held usually around an individual who leads the ceremony. Round dances may be ceremonial or purely social. Usually, the dancers are accompanied by a group of singers who may also play hand drums in unison. The dancers join hands to form a large circle. The dancers move with a side-shuffle step to reflect the long-short pattern of the drum beat, bending their knees to emphasize the pattern.

During his studies of the Pacific Northwest tribes the anthropologist Leslie Spier used the term "prophet dances" to describe ceremonial round dances where the participants seek trance, exhortations and prophecy. Spier studied peoples of the Columbia plateau (a region including Washington, Oregon, Idaho, and parts of western Montana). By the time of his studies the only dances he was allowed to witness were social dances or ones that had already incorporated Christian elements, making investigation of the round dance's origin complicated.

=== Ghost Dance ceremony ===
Eyewitness accounts of the Ghost Dance prior to the Wounded Knee Massacre include Ella Cara Deloria and Elaine and Dora Goodale. The Ghost Dance included hundreds of participants in its peak, with many visiting from nearby reservations to participate, with those participants fasting for one to two days prior to the ceremony. On the day of the dance, men and women enter a separate sweat lodge. During a period of two to four days dancers hold hands with their heads looking upwards and slowly sideways shuffle their feet in a clockwise formation while singing Ghost Dance songs. Shamans will wave eagle wing fans in the faces of the participants.

The combination of days-long dancing caused exhaustion, participants fall unconscious into the center, the gaps being closed by other dancers. The goal was to enter a Trance, where the dancer is transported into the afterworld and meets with lost realities, and times before the arrival of Europeans when the Bison was found in abundance. Wailing, cries, and perplexed looks were found from the dancers as they woke from their unconscious state and retold their experiences to the shamans.

The Ghost Dance is danced with Ghost Dance songs. Leonard Crow Dog recalls in his memoir during the Wounded Knee Occupation of 1973 the chants they were singing:

"The whole world is coming, a nation is coming, a nation is coming, the eagle brought the message, says the father, says the father, the whole world is coming, the buffalo are coming, the buffalo are coming, the crow has brought the message, says the father, says the father. The crow nation is coming, says the father, says the father."

== The Prophet ==
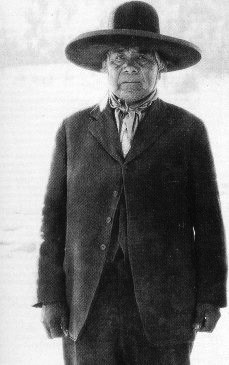
Wovoka, the Northern Paiute spiritual leader and creator of the Ghost Dance

Wovoka, the prophet otherwise known as Jack Wilson, was believed to have had a vision during a solar eclipse on January 1, 1889. It was reportedly not his first time experiencing a vision, but since it was his first as a young adult, he claimed that he was now better equipped, spiritually, to handle this message. Jack had received training from an experienced holy man under his parents' guidance after they realized that he was having difficulty interpreting his previous visions. Jack was also training to be a "weather doctor", following in his father's footsteps. He was known throughout Mason Valley as a gifted and blessed young leader. Preaching a message of universal love, he often presided over circle dances, which symbolized the sun's heavenly path across the sky.

Anthropologist James Mooney conducted an interview with Wovoka, whom he called by his English name, prior to 1892. Mooney confirmed that his message matched that given to his fellow Indians. This study compared letters between tribes. According to Mooney, Wilson's letter said he stood before God in heaven and had seen many of his ancestors engaged in their favorite pastimes, and that God showed Wilson a beautiful land filled with wild game and instructed him to return home to tell his people that they must love each other and not fight. He also stated that Jesus was being reincarnated on Earth in 1892, that the people must work, not steal or lie, and that they must not engage in the old practices of war or the traditional self-mutilation practices connected with mourning the dead. He said that if his people abided by these rules, they would be united with their friends and family in the other world, and in God's presence, there would be no sickness, disease, or old age.

Mooney writes that Wilson was given the Ghost Dance and commanded to take it back to his people. He preached that if the five-day dance was performed in the proper intervals, the performers would secure their happiness and hasten the reunion of the living and deceased. Wilson said that the Creator gave him powers over the weather and that he would be the deputy in charge of affairs in the western United States, leaving current President Harrison as God's deputy in the East. Jack claims that he was then told to return home and preach God's message.

Wovoka claimed to have left the presence of God convinced that if every Indian in the West danced the new dance to "hasten the event", all evil in the world would be swept away, leaving a renewed Earth filled with food, love, and faith. Quickly accepted by his Paiute brethren, the new religion was termed, "Dance In A Circle". Because the first European contact with the practice came by way of the Lakota, their expression "Spirit Dance" was adopted as a descriptive title for all such practices. This was subsequently translated as "Ghost Dance".

== Recordings, film, cinema, theater and industrialization ==
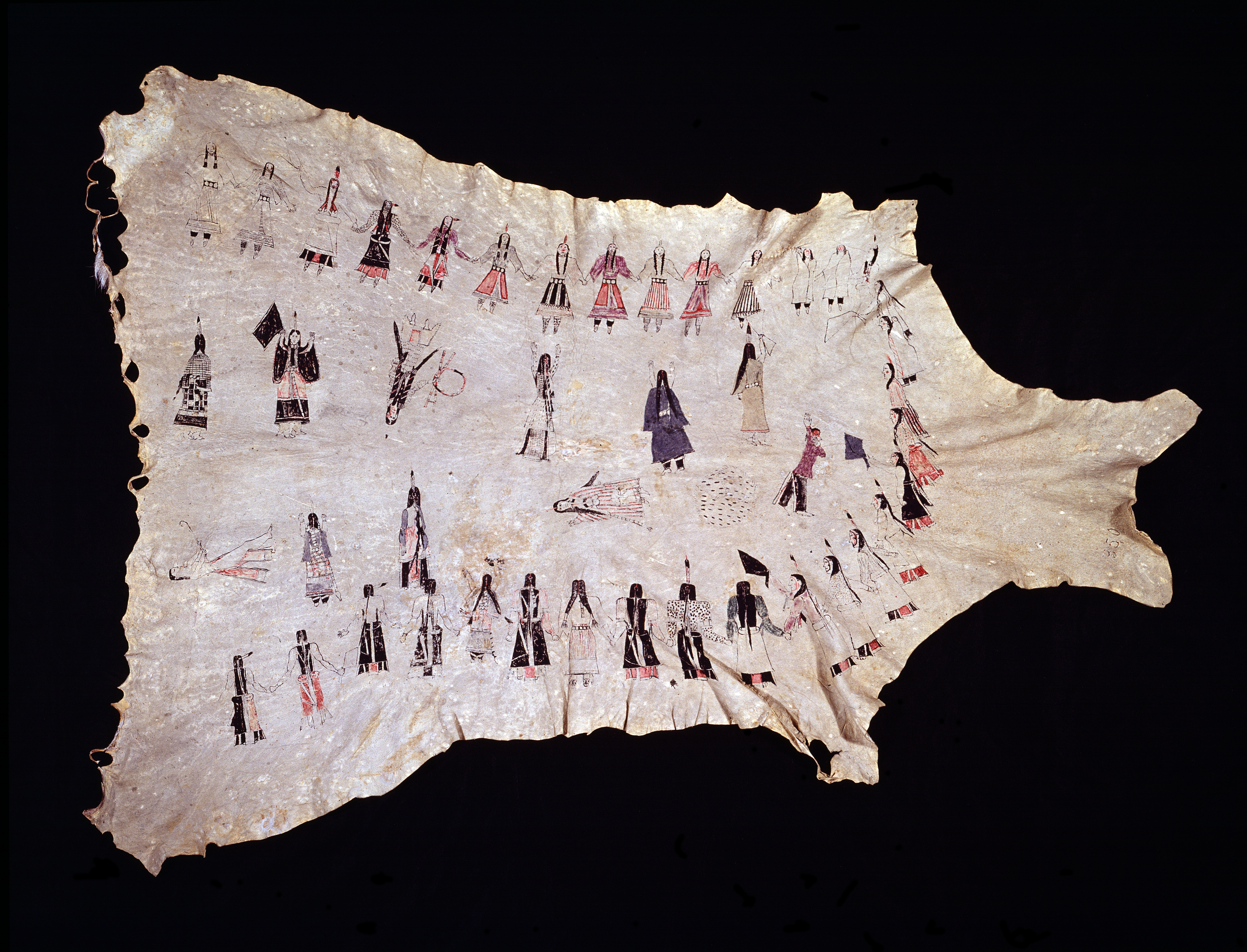
Polychrome depiction of Ghost Dance on deer hide, 1890s

Shortly after the commercialisation of Emile Berliner's Gramophone, a small set of Ghost Dances (curated by James Mooney) were recorded and pressed in 1894, the original masters being held at the Library of Congress. It is unclear who the interpreter of the songs is, possibly James Mooney himself, owing to the interpretation of different tribes' rituals by one same voice.

The invention of the Kinetoscope created and developed by Thomas Edison and William Kennedy Dickson was a part of the beginning of a movement to cast and film Indigenous North Americans performing ceremonies, dances, and hunting. The kinetoscope was largely popular in the 1890s in both the East and West coast of the United States. These motion pictures were produced to contain a level of shock value to satisfy the viewers who would pay fifty cents to watch it. Films of Indigenous North Americans include a twenty-two second video of "Sioux Ghost Dance," the passing around of the peace pipe, the buffalo dance, and the Omaha war dance.

The Sioux Ghost Dance film offers non-natives an inaccurate depiction of the Ghost Dance. In the film there is a drum, but the dance itself does not include instruments. The dancer's heads are faced downward, hands are holding pipes and moving their feet in a fast-paced motion, whereas the original dance is slow, hands are held together, and heads are usually looking upward. Dancers are crammed into the small stage to accommodate the small space for the kinetoscope to view.

The rise in popularity coincided with Buffalo Bill's Wild West shows where, "The role of Indian people was both essential and anomalous in the Wild West. At least in the big shows, they generally were treated and paid the same as other performers. They were able to travel with their families, and they earned a living not possible to them on their reservations. They were encouraged by Buffalo Bill and others to retain their language and rituals. They gained access to political and economic leaders, and their causes were sometimes argued in the published show programs. Yet they were stereotyped as mounted, war-bonneted warriors, the last impediment to civilization. Thus they had to re-fight a losing war nightly; and their hollow victory in the Little Big Horn enactments demonstrated over and over to their audiences the justification for American conquest.

== Spread of the prophet's message ==
Great Sioux Nation tribe dancers, in dance regalia, 1894

Through Native Americans and some white settlers, Wilson's message spread across much of the western portion of the United States. Early in the religious movement, many tribes sent members to investigate the self-proclaimed prophet, while other communities sent delegates only to be cordial. Regardless of their initial motivations, many left as believers and returned to their homeland preaching his message. The Ghost Dance was also investigated by many Mormons from Utah, for whom the concepts of the Indian prophet were familiar and often accepted. While many followers of the Ghost Dance believed Wovoka to be a teacher of pacifism and peace, others did not.

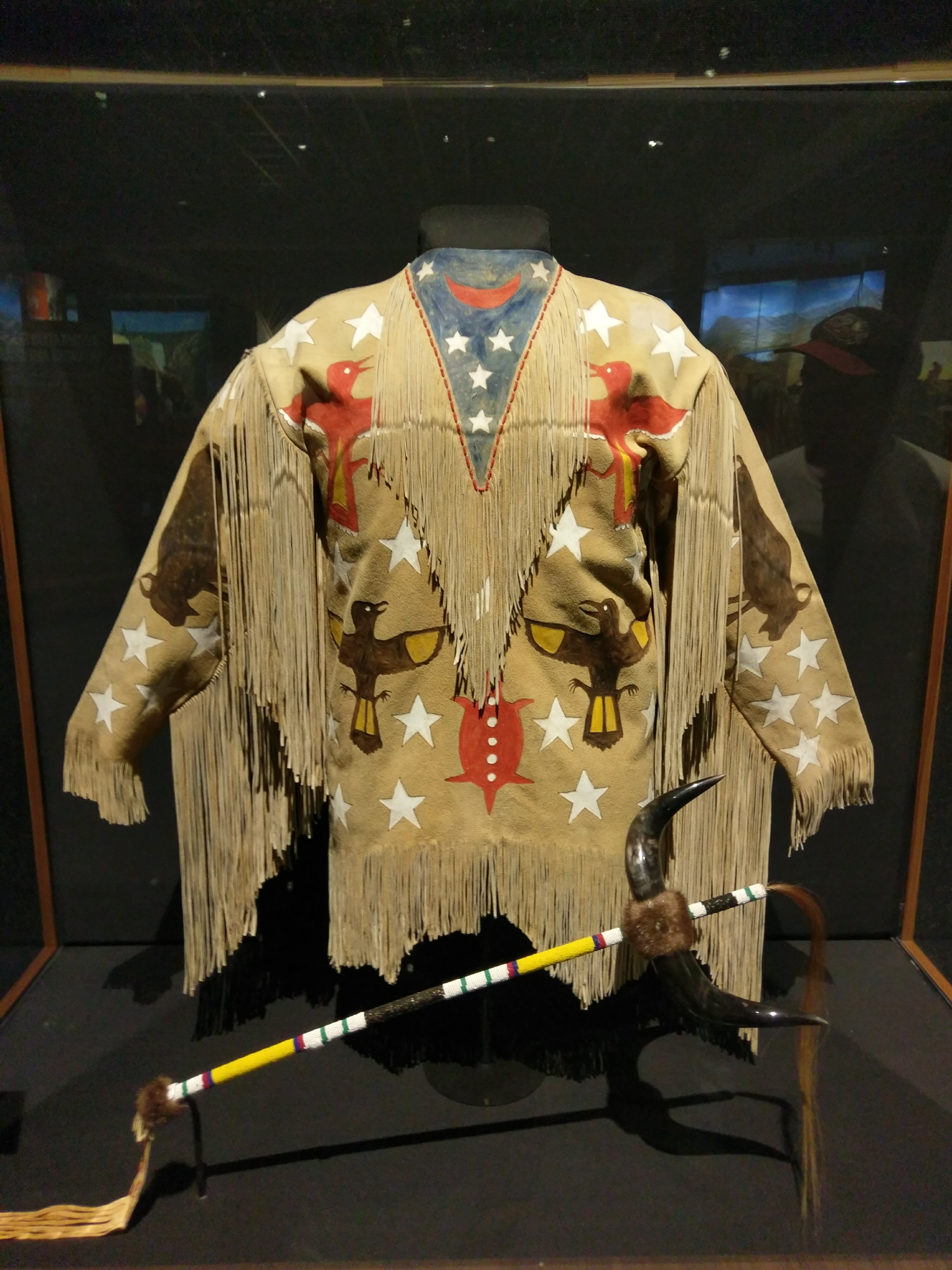
An Arapaho buckskin ghost shirt, ca 1890

An elaboration of the Ghost Dance concept was the development of ghost shirts, which were special clothing that warriors could wear. They were rumored to repel bullets through spiritual power. It is uncertain where this belief originated. Scholars believe that in 1890 Chief Kicking Bear introduced the concept to his people, the Lakota. James Mooney argued that the most likely source is the Latter-day Saint temple garment, which Latter-day Saints believe protect the pious wearer from evil.

The Lakota interpretation drew from their traditional idea of a "renewed Earth" in which "all evil is washed away". This Lakota interpretation included the removal of all European Americans from their lands:

They told the people they could dance a new world into being. There would be landslides, earthquakes, and big winds. Hills would pile up on each other. The earth would roll up like a carpet with all the white man's ugly things – the stinking new animals, sheep and pigs, the fences, the telegraph poles, the mines and factories. Underneath would be the wonderful old-new world as it had been before the white fat-takers came. ...The white men will be rolled up, disappear, go back to their own continent. (p. 228)

— Lame Deer

== Political influence ==
In February 1890, the United States government broke a Lakota treaty by adjusting the Great Sioux Reservation of South Dakota, an area that formerly encompassed the majority of the state, and breaking it up into five smaller reservations. The government was accommodating white homesteaders from the eastern United States. It intended to "break up tribal relationships" and "conform Indians to the white man's ways, peaceably if they will, or forcibly if they must".

On the reduced reservations, the government allocated family units on 320-acre (1.3 km^{2}) plots for individual households. The Lakota were expected to farm and raise livestock, and to send their children to boarding schools. With the goal of assimilation, the schools taught English and Christianity, as well as American cultural practices. Generally, they forbade inclusion of Indian traditional cultures and languages.

To help support the Lakota during the period of transition, the Bureau of Indian Affairs (BIA) was to supplement the Lakota with food and to hire white farmers as teachers for the people. The farming plan failed to take into account the difficulty that Lakota farmers would have in trying to cultivate crops in the semi-arid region of South Dakota. By the end of the 1890 growing season, a time of intense heat and low rainfall, it was clear that the land was unable to produce substantial agricultural yields. Unfortunately, this was also the time when the government's patience with supporting the so-called "lazy Indians" ran out. They cut rations for the Lakota in half. With the bison having been virtually eradicated a few years earlier, the Lakota were at risk of starvation.

The people turned to the Ghost Dance ritual, which frightened the supervising agents of the BIA. Those who had been residing in the area for a long time recognized that the ritual was often held shortly before battle was to occur. Kicking Bear was forced to leave Standing Rock, but when the dances continued unabated, Agent James McLaughlin asked for more troops. He claimed the Hunkpapa spiritual leader Sitting Bull was the real leader of the movement. A former agent, Valentine McGillycuddy, saw nothing extraordinary in the dances and ridiculed the panic that seemed to have overcome the agencies, saying:

The coming of the troops has frightened the Indians. If the Seventh-day Adventists prepare the ascension robes for the Second Coming of the Savior, the United States Army is not put in motion to prevent them. Why should not the Indians have the same privilege? If the troops remain, trouble is sure to come.

Nonetheless, thousands of additional U.S. Army troops were deployed to the reservation. On December 15, 1890, Sitting Bull was arrested for failing to stop his people from practicing the Ghost Dance. During the incident, one of Sitting Bull's men, Catch the Bear, fired at Lieutenant "Bull Head", striking his right side. He instantly wheeled and shot Sitting Bull, hitting him in the left side, between the tenth and eleventh ribs; this exchange resulted in deaths on both sides, including that of Sitting Bull.

== Wounded Knee ==
Spotted Elk (Lakota: Unpan Glešká – also known as Big Foot) was a Miniconjou leader on the U.S. Army's list of 'trouble-making' Indians. On December 29, 1890, he was stopped while en route to convene with the remaining Lakota chiefs. U.S. Army officers forced him to relocate with his people to a small camp close to the Pine Ridge Agency. Here the soldiers could more closely watch the old chief. That evening, December 28, the small band of Lakota erected their tipis on the banks of Wounded Knee Creek.

The following day, during an attempt by the officers to collect weapons from the band, one young, deaf Lakota warrior refused to relinquish his arms. A struggle followed in which somebody's weapon discharged into the air. One U.S. officer gave the command to open fire, and the Lakota responded by taking up previously confiscated weapons. The U.S. forces responded with carbine firearms and several rapid-fire light-artillery Hotchkiss guns mounted on the overlooking hill. When the fighting had concluded, 200-300 Lakota had been massacred by US soldiers - most were women and children. 25 U.S. soldiers lay dead, many killed by friendly fire.

Following the massacre, Chief Kicking Bear officially surrendered his weapon to General Nelson A. Miles.

Twenty U.S. soldiers received the Medal of Honor for their actions. Some sources state the number as 18 or 23. American Indian and human rights activists have referred to these as "Medals of Dis-Honor" and called for the awards to be rescinded, but none have been revoked.

Following the Wounded Knee Massacre, open participation in the Ghost Dance movement declined gradually for fear of continued violence against practitioners. Like most Indian ceremonies, it became clandestine rather than dying out completely.

Congress officially apologized for the Wounded Knee Massacre in 1990 but did not rescind any awards of the Medal of Honor.

== Rejection ==
Despite the widespread acceptance of the Ghost Dance movement, Navajo leaders described the Ghost Dance as "worthless words" in 1890. Three years later, James Mooney arrived at the Navajo reservation in northern Arizona during his study of the Ghost Dance movement and found the Navajo never incorporated the ritual into their society.

Kehoe believed the movement did not gain traction with the tribe due to the Navajo's higher levels of social and economic satisfaction at the time. Another factor was cultural norms among the Navajo, which inculcated a fear of ghosts and spirits, based on religious beliefs.

== Modern status ==
The Wounded Knee massacre was not the end of the Ghost Dance religious movement. Instead, it went underground. Wovoka continued to spread its message, along with Kicking Bear, Short Bull and other spiritual leaders. The Ghost Dance is practiced by most notably the Caddo, but details are confined to the participants.

During the Wounded Knee incident of 1973, Lakota men and women, including Mary Brave Bird, did the ghost dance ceremony on the site where their ancestors had been killed. In her book Lakota Woman, Brave Bird wrote that ghost dances continue as private ceremonies.

== See also ==
- Boxer Rebellion (1899–1901), during which Boxers claimed that the spirits protected them from bullets.
- Caroline Weldon, an artist and activist helping Sitting Bull.
- Medicine man
- Wovoka
- Kicking Bear
- Wounded Knee Massacre
- Millennarianism in colonial societies
- Mumboism, a spiritual movement that protested British colonial rule in Kenya.
- Native American Church
- Nemattanew, a captain of the Powhatan, died in 1622, who believed himself invulnerable to bullets.
- New religious movement
- Nongqawuse, a Xhosa prophetess who in the 1850s led the Xhosa cattle-killing movement.
- Papa Isio, a shaman who led forces in the Philippine Revolution
- Taki Unquy, a millenarian spiritual movement of the Indigenous Andean peoples, that took expression in dancing and chanting, against the then recent and ongoing Spanish conquest of the Inca Empire.
