= History of Christianity =

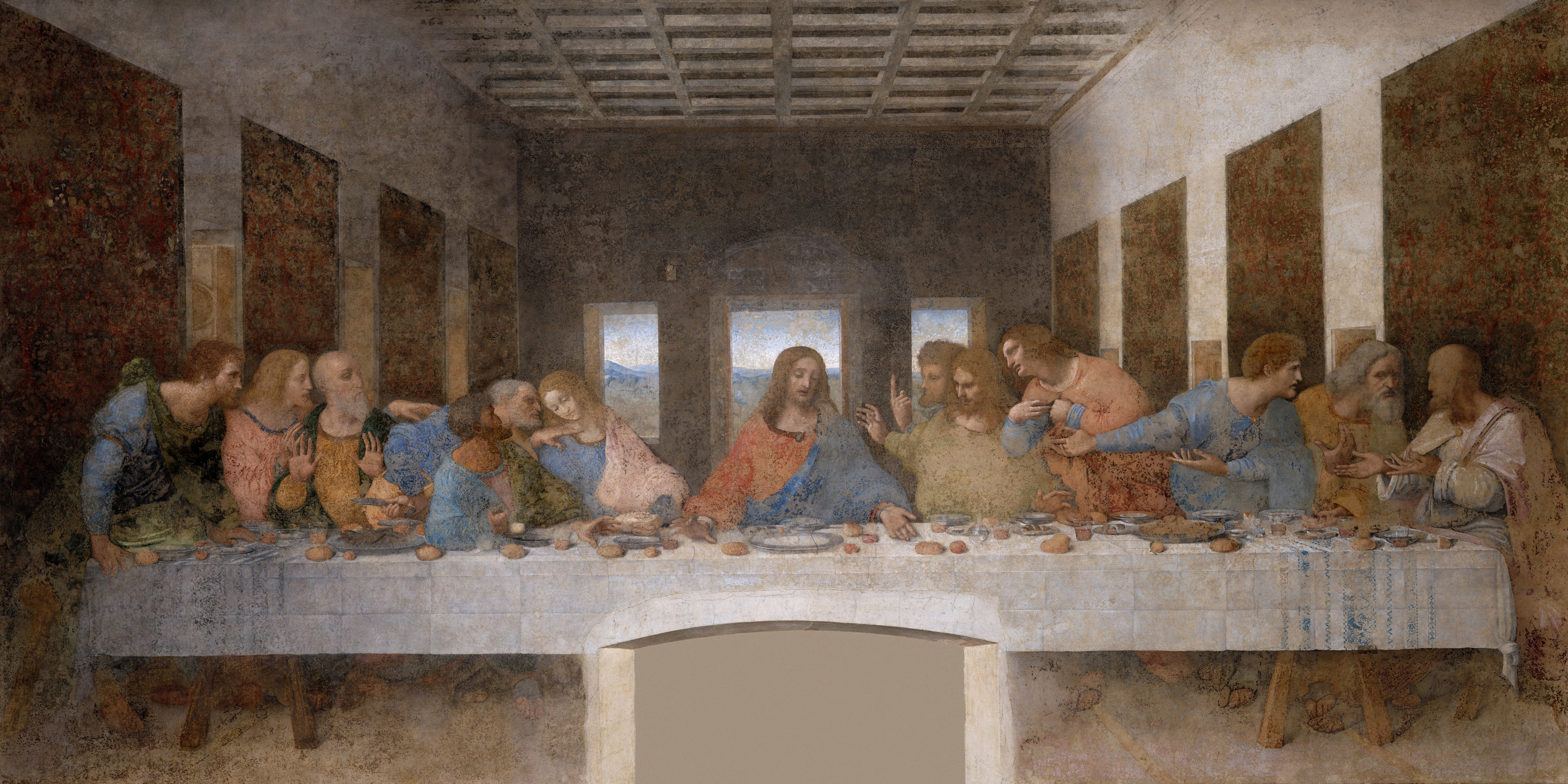
The Last Supper by Leonardo da Vinci (c. 1495) in the Santa Maria delle Grazie Church in Milan, Italy, depicts the final meal before Jesus' crucifixion and death.

The history of Christianity begins with Jesus, an itinerant Jewish preacher and teacher, who was crucified in Jerusalem c. AD 30–33. His followers proclaimed that he was the incarnation of God and had risen from the dead. In the two millennia since, Christianity has spread across the world, becoming the world's largest religion with over two billion adherents worldwide.

Christianity was a mostly urban grassroots movement that grew to over a million adherents by the third century. In its first century, it began developing a church government and a religious text, which was not formalized as canon until the fourth century. Constantine the Great issued the Edict of Milan legalizing it in 313. Christian art, architecture, and literature blossomed during the fourth century, but competing theological doctrines led to divisions. The Nicene Creed of 325, the Nestorian schism, the Church of the East and Oriental Orthodoxy resulted.

After the fall of Rome in 476, the West was divided. Monks preserved culture and provided social services. Early Muslim conquests devastated many Christian communities in the Middle East and North Africa causing decline. The church in the East prospered in Asia and helped form the states of Eastern Europe. The 1054 East–West Schism marked the separation of Eastern Orthodoxy and the Catholic Church. In spite of many differences, the East requested western military aid against the Turks, resulting in the Crusades. Gregorian reform led to a more centralized and bureaucratic Catholicism. Faced with internal and external challenges, the church fought heresy and established courts of inquisition. Artistic and intellectual advances among western monks played a part in the Renaissance of the 12th century and the later Scientific Revolution.

In the 14th century, the Western Schism and several European crises led to the 16th-century Reformation when Protestantism formed. Reformation Protestants advocated for religious tolerance and the separation of church and state and impacted economics. Quarrelling royal houses took sides in the European wars of religion. Christianity spread with the colonization of the Americas, Australia, and New Zealand. Different parts of Christianity influenced the Age of Enlightenment, American and French Revolutions, the Industrial Revolution, and participated in the Atlantic slave trade and its abolition. Some Protestants created biblical criticism while others responded to rationalism with Pietism and religious revivals that created new denominations. Nineteenth century missionaries laid the linguistic and cultural foundation of many nations.

In the twentieth century, Christianity declined in most of the Western world but grew in the Global South, particularly Southeast Asia and Sub-Saharan Africa. In the twenty first century, Christianity has become the largest and most diverse and pluralistic of the world's religions embracing over 3000 of the world's languages.

== Early Christianity (c. 27 – fourth century) ==
=== First century ===
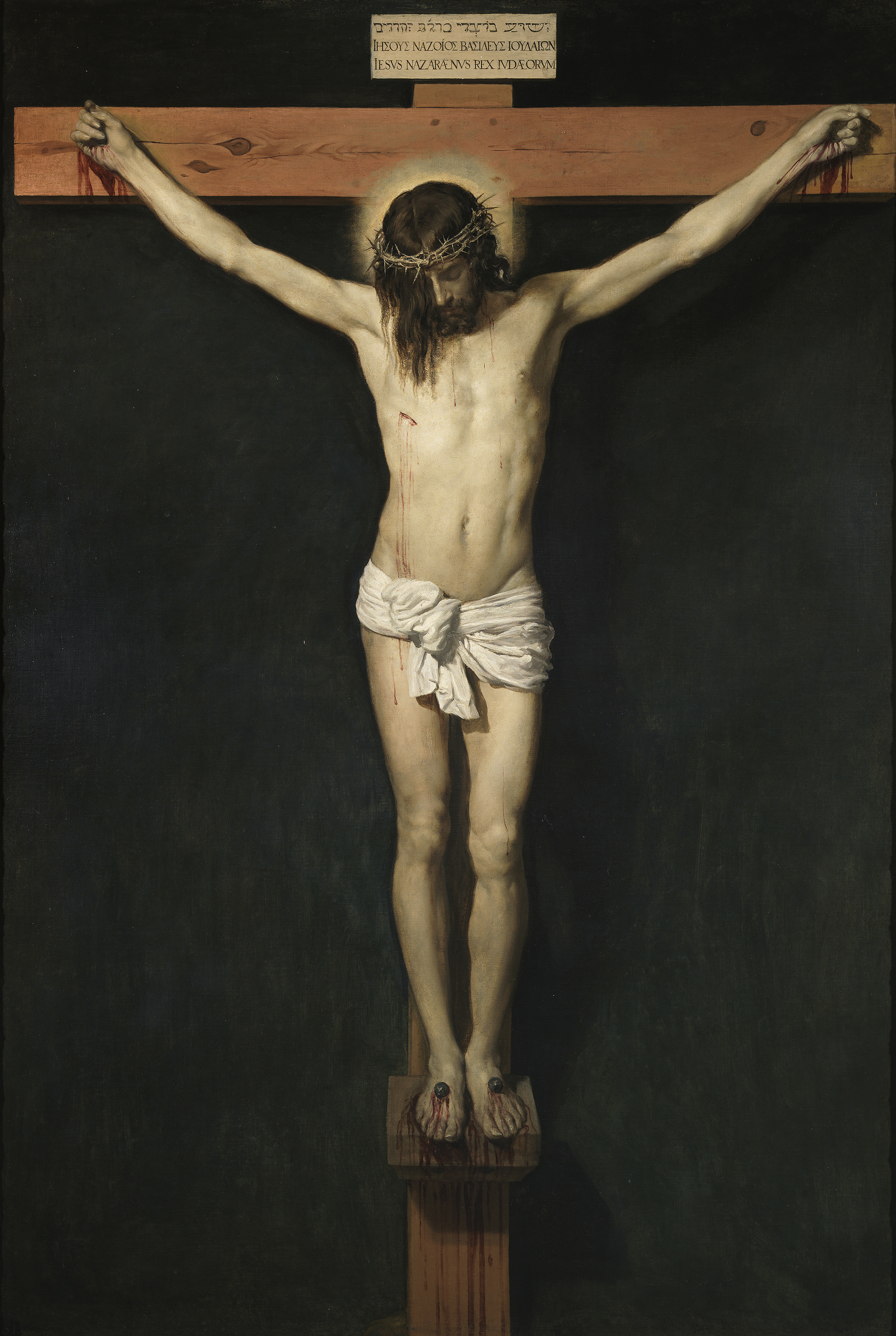
Christ Crucified, by Diego Velázquez c. 1632, depicting the crucifixion of Jesus

Christianity began in the first century with Jesus of Nazareth, a Jewish man and itinerant preacher in Galilee and the Roman province of Judea. He was a prophetic figure who proclaimed the coming kingdom of God, and taught the "relativity of earthly authority", which was seen as a threat by those who eventually had him crucified. Much about Jesus is uncertain, but his crucifixion c. 30 is well attested.

The religious, social, and political climate in Judaea was characterized by turmoil and numerous religious and political movements. Jewish messianism promised a messianic redeemer descended from Israel's ancient King David. Those who followed Jesus, called disciples, saw him as that Messiah. Incarnation, the belief that God (or the Word of God) was embodied in Jesus, and resurrection, the belief that after his crucifixion, he rose from the dead, were Christianity's earliest beliefs. Its earliest rituals were baptism, a rite of initiation, and the communal Eucharist, a celebration of the new covenant at Jesus' last meal before death.

The first Christians were predominantly Jews identified "by their allegiance to Jesus of Nazareth". They gathered in small groups inside private homes where the typical setting for worship was the communal meal. Elders (called presbyters or bishops) oversaw the small groups, providing for the economic requirements of the meal and for charitable distributions. Women comprised significant numbers of Christianity's earliest members.

Christianity most likely began with fewer than 1000 believers, which grew to approximately one hundred small household churches, each with an average of seventy members, by the year 100. The largest cities in the Roman Empire, such as Rome, Alexandria, Antioch, Ephesus, and Carthage, all had Christian congregations by the end of the first century.

Of the original believers, Jesus had kept twelve disciples closest to him. They became known as the Twelve Apostles though there were other apostles. Saul of Tarsus, who became Paul the Apostle, was a Jewish Pharisee who persecuted early Christians. According to his own account, his life took a turn in the opposite direction after he had an experience with Christ on the road to Damascus. The twelve Apostles and Paul identified evangelism as a task to be undertaken, which prompted them to travel sharing their message. Christianity spread along the trade and travel routes, into the Jewish diaspora, and beyond the Roman Empire.

In the early centuries, the languages most used by Christianity were Greek, Syriac (a form of Aramaic), and Latin. Christian writings in Koine Greek, including the four gospels (the accounts of Jesus' ministry), letters of Paul, and letters attributed to other early Christian leaders, were written in the first century and had considerable authority, even in the formative period. Letters sent by Paul the Apostle to Christian communities were circulating in collected form by the end of the first century.

Despite martyrs such as Stephen, the movement grew, reaching Antioch where converts were first called Christian by non-Christians. From Antioch, Barnabas and Paul went to Cyprus, then Asia Minor, where the gospel was received by both Jewish and non-Jewish people. The conversion of Gentiles led to disputes with a group who desired observance of Mosaic law including circumcision. James, brother of Jesus, called the Council of Jerusalem (c. 50) to address this issue. The council determined that converts should avoid "pollution of idols, fornication, things strangled, and blood" but should not be required to follow other aspects of Jewish Law (KJV, Acts 15:20–21). Disagreements over Jewish law, progenitors of Rabbinic Judaism, and insurrections against Rome, contributed to a gradual separation from Judaism. Nevertheless, Jewish Christianity remained influential in Palestine, Syria, and Asia Minor into the second and third centuries.

=== Ante-Nicene period (100–312) ===
The Christian faith spread east into Syria and Mesopotamia where the population spoke Aramaic, not Greek. Aramaic Christians were in Adiabene (northern Iraq) by the second century. By the second century Christianity was in North Africa, and by the third century, it had spread across the Mediterranean region, from Greece and Anatolia into the Balkans in the East, and as far as Roman Britain in the northwest.

Christianity's ideology, combined with its social impact, was pivotal to this growth. Christianity offered people new ways of thinking. For example, the idea that the power of God was manifested through Jesus in a reversal of power challenged Roman concepts of hierarchy. In sociologist Rodney Stark's view, Christianity grew because it constituted an "intense community" which provided a unique "sense of belonging". However, early Christianity demonstrates both inclusion and exclusion. Belief in Jesus was the crucial and defining characteristic for becoming a Christian, and early Christianity was highly inclusive toward anyone who expressed such belief. However, believers were also highly exclusive; they were separated from unbelievers by a strong social boundary that avoided traditional practices such as public baths and military service.

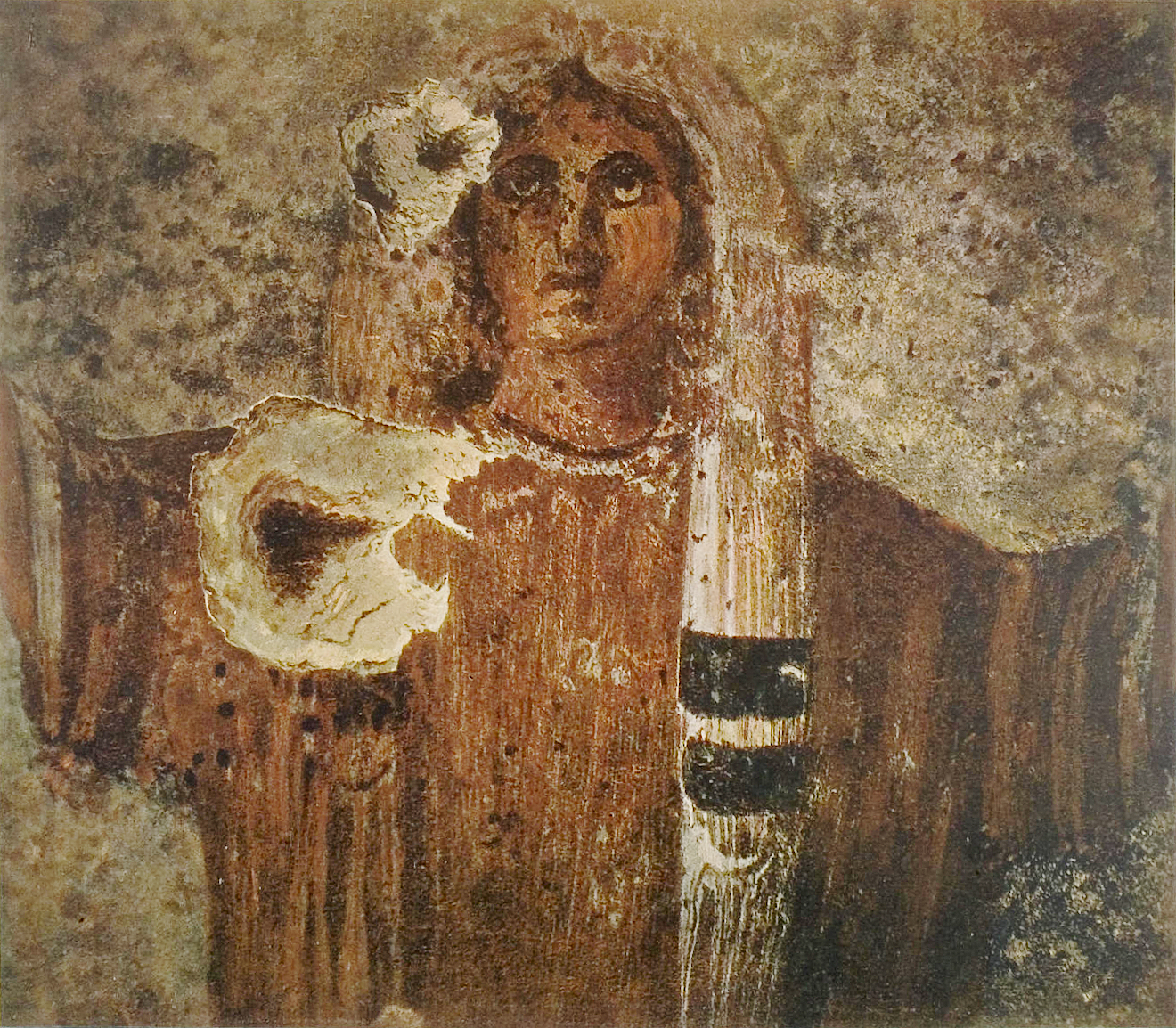
Half-length portrait of a virgin consecrated to God, praying with an orante prayer position, from the book Die Malereien der Katakomben Roms, plate 80

Women are prominent in the Pauline epistles and early Christian art. (Note: Religion had appeal because women could attain greater freedom through religious activities than Roman customs otherwise permitted. The Pauline epistles recognize their presence in early Christian congregations. The ascetic life was attractive to large numbers of women because it granted them some control over their destinies, offered them escape from marriage and motherhood, and an intellectual life with access to social and economic power.) Church rolls from the second century list groups of women "exercising the office of widow". Much of the most virulent anti-Christian criticism of this period was linked to "female initiative", which may have contributed to the sporadic but increasing persecution.

Christians were persecuted by the Roman empire because they did not uphold fundamental beliefs of Roman society and their withdrawal from public religion made them targets of suspicion and rumor. For most of its early centuries, Christianity was tolerated, and episodes of persecution were local. For example, Emperor Nero's persecution of Christians during the mid-1st century was confined to Rome. There were no empire-wide persecutions until the 250s. Official persecution reached its height under Diocletian in 303–311.

By 200, Christian numbers had grown to over 200,000 people, and communities with an average size of 500–1000 people existed in approximately 200–400 towns. By 250, Christianity had grown to over a million. House churches were then succeeded by buildings designed to be churches, complete with assembly rooms, classrooms, and dining rooms. A more formal church government developed. Bishops were essential to this, and they rose in power and influence as they began to preside over larger areas with multiple churches.

Christian sects, cults, and movements rose during the second and third centuries. Gnosticism challenged the physical nature of Jesus, Montanism suggested that the apostles could be superseded, and Monarchianism emphasized the unity of God over the Trinity. In the face of such diversity, unity was provided by the shared scriptures and bishops. The four gospels and the letters of Paul were generally regarded as authoritative, but other writings, such as the Book of Revelation and the epistles to the Hebrews, James, and 1 John, were assigned different degrees of authority.

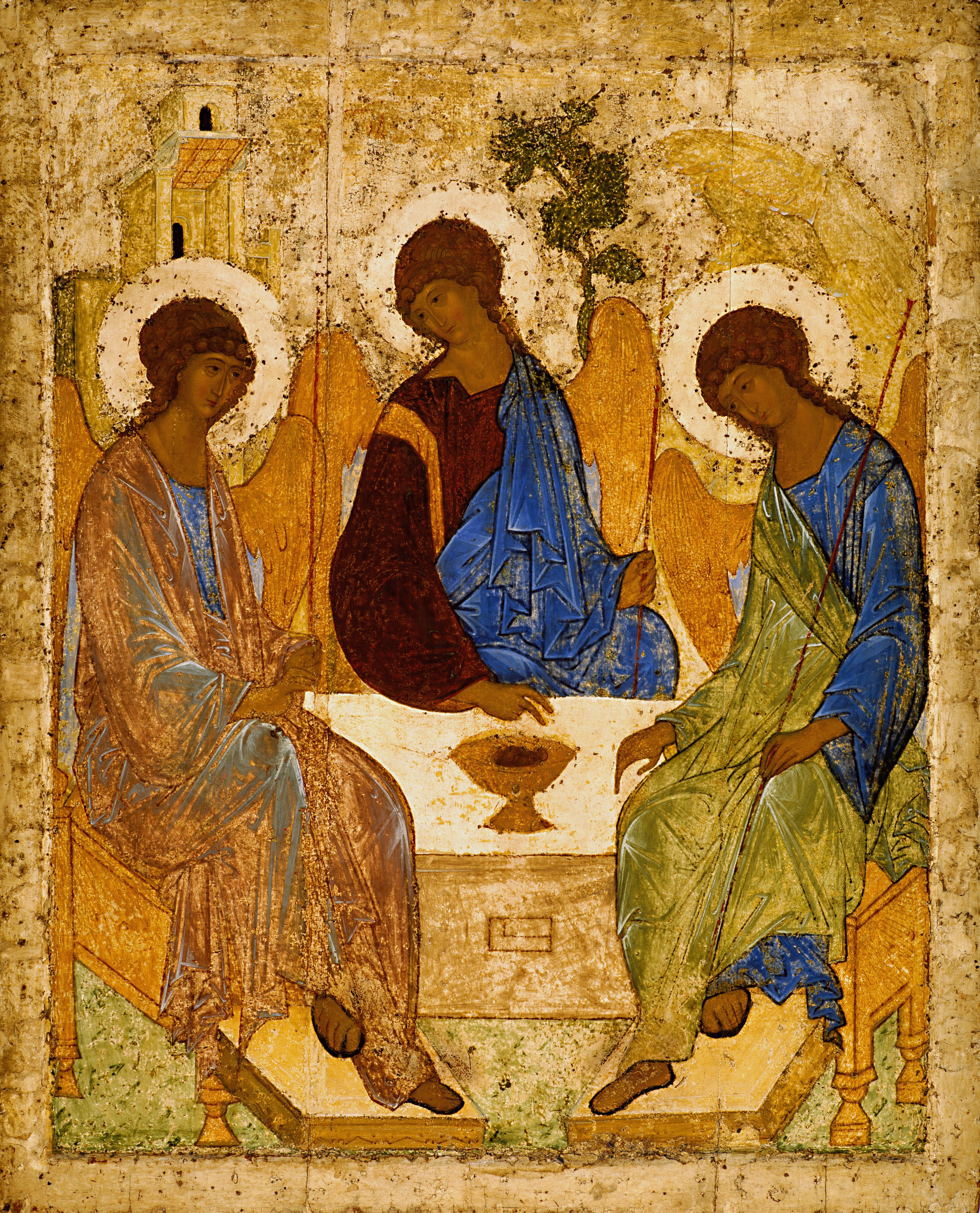
The Trinity by Russian icon painter Andrei Rublev, early 15th century.

The fluidity of the New Testament in the first century does not seem to have affected belief in the Trinity as it connected to Christology and salvation. Christianity's central mystery, the Trinity, defines the Holy Spirit, Father, and Son as one God in three persons. However, there is also an evolution of thought in the Patristic writings, then the development of the canon, and later in the theological controversies of the fourth century, that shaped the concept's development and gradually created a more technical Trinitarian vocabulary.

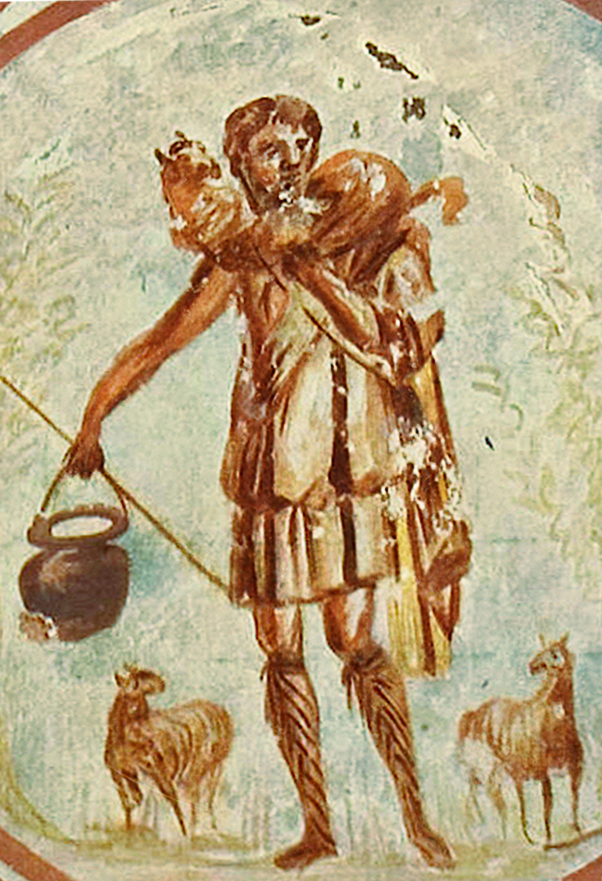
One of the oldest representations of Jesus as the Good Shepherd, made around 300 AD.

There are few remnants of early Christian art, but the oldest, dated between 200 and 400, have been found in the catacombs of Rome. It typically fused Graeco-Roman style and Christian symbolism: the most common image was Jesus as the good shepherd.

== Late antiquity (313 – c. 600) ==
In 313, the emperor Constantine, a self-declared Christian, issued the Edict of Milan expressing tolerance for all religions. Constantine supported Christianity by giving bishops judicial power and establishing them as legally equal to polytheistic priests. He devoted personal and public funds to building churches and endowed them with funds to support their clergy.

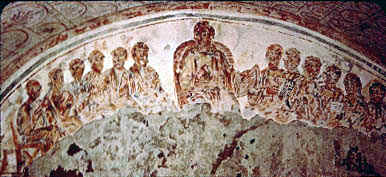
Ancient fresco of agape feast from the Roman catacombs

Christianity transformed. Christian art, architecture, and literature blossomed. The basilica, a type of Roman municipal court hall, became the model for Christian architecture. Frescoes, mosaics, statues, and paintings blended classical and Christian styles. Similarly, a hybrid form of poetry written in classical styles with Christian concepts emerged. In the late fourth century, Jerome was commissioned to translate the Greek biblical texts into the Latin language; this translation was called the Vulgate. Church Fathers of this period, such as Augustine of Hippo, John Chrysostom, Gregory of Nyssa, Athanasius of Alexandria, Basil of Caesarea, Gregory of Nazianzus, Cyril of Alexandria, and Ambrose of Milan, wrote vast numbers of works. There were churches in the majority of Roman cities by the end of the fourth century.

Before the fourth century, Judaism had been an approved religion, while Christianity was persecuted as an illegal superstition; during the fourth century, Christianity became favored by emperors and Judaism came to be seen as similar to heresy. Still, Augustine of Hippo argued that Jews should not be killed or forcibly converted; they should be left alone because they preserved the teachings of the Old Testament and were "living witnesses" of the New Testament. Aside from the Visigothic Kingdom, Jews and Christians peacefully coexisted, for the most part, into the High Middle Ages.

Imperial and ecclesiastical politics grew increasingly intertwined, and Christianity moved from being the church of outsiders into the heart of state politics. Church leaders responded with the first fully articulated limitation on secular authority. However, the successors to Peter as Bishop of Rome (known as the Pope) had limited influence, and they lacked the power to break free of secular involvement in church affairs. Entanglement with the state continued to be problematic for the church into the twentieth-century.

=== Monasticism ===
The ascetic ideal was embraced by monasticism, which had begun earlier in Syria and was key to the development of Christianity. In Late Antiquity, monastic communities became associated with the urban holy places in Palestine, Cappadocia, Italy, Gaul, and Roman North Africa. In the 370s, Basil the Great founded the Basileias, a monastic community in Caesarea (Mazaca) which developed the first health care system for the poor, a forerunner of modern public hospitals.

=== Geographical spread ===
Christianity grew rapidly throughout this period. Christians in Persia, (present-day Iraq), were deeply persecuted in Late Antiquity, but their numbers still grew. In the fourth century the percentage of Christians was as high in the Sasanian Empire as in the Roman Empire. A form of Christianity made inroads among Arabs in Palestine, Yemen, and Arabia. Even as the Huns, Ostrogoths, Visigoths, and Vandals caused havoc in the Roman Empire in the fourth and fifth centuries, many of them converted to Christianity. Syria was home to a thriving theological school. The gospel was first brought to Central Asia and China by Syriac-speaking missionaries.

Christian institutions in Asia or East Africa never developed the kind of influence that the European churches and Byzantium held. Even so, in 301, the Kingdom of Armenia became the first nation to adopt Christianity as its state religion, soon followed by Caucasian Albania and the East African Kingdom of Aksum. In the early fifth century, missionaries began converting Ireland. Christianity, a minority faith in Britain since the second century, began to be displaced by Anglo-Saxon paganism in the fifth century. However, this process reversed after the Gregorian mission of 597.

=== Religious violence ===
Traditionally, scholars interpreted Late Antique writings describing violence by Christians against paganism as evidence of a widespread historical reality. Modern scholarship has broken up the old paradigms, finding that both Christians and pagans misattributed and over-reported violence. There were violent incidents, but they were few, local, limited, and at the ordinary level of occurrence in Roman society.

Christians saw Constantine's conversion as proof the Christian God had defeated the pagan gods in Heaven. The purpose of claims of violence in their writings was to further the new identity they adopted for themselves as "victors". For example, literature says Constantine ordered the destruction of the altar at Mamre, building a church in its place; archaeology found Constantine's church, but it was in a peripheral sector that left the rest unhindered. Temple destruction is attested in 43 cases in the written sources, but only four are supported by archaeological evidence.

Constantine adopted a policy of toleration with limits toward non-Christians; there were no forced conversions, no purges, and no pagan martyrs. However, there was virulent legal hostility toward certain pagan practices. Blood sacrifice, which had been a central rite of virtually all religious groups in the pre-Christian Mediterranean, disappeared by the end of the fourth century due in part to hostile imperial laws. Still, polytheism remained active into the fifth century, and in some places, into the ninth, even though popular support for the polytheistic religions had been in decline since the second century BC. (Note: Paganism's decline was likely contributed to by economic factors such as the decline of urbanism and prosperity in the economic crisis of the third century. Economic disruption occurred from the migrations of Germanic peoples in the fourth and fifth centuries that made fewer public funds and private donations available to support expensive pagan festivals and temples.)

Debate was the primary method of competition between pagans and Christians. Persuasion, rhetoric and polemics centered on the true meaning of the word. Pagans asserted its correct meaning was allegorical and could be found in ancient myths and poetics. Christians asserted Jesus as the living word in their first true ontologies.

Constantine generally supported resolving religious disputes through debate without violence, but in 304, Donatists formed a schism in North Africa, refusing, often violently, to accept back into the church those who had cooperated with the Romans during Diocletian's persecution. The emperor attempted to impose public order through force, but it was ineffective. In 321, Constantine decided no more punishment would be given to Donatists, but their Catholic victims would be venerated as Christian martyrs.

In 408, Augustine of Hippo defended the government's violent response by asserting that coercion could not produce genuine conversion, but it could soften resistance and make conversion possible. According to Peter Brown, Augustine thus "provided the theological foundation for the justification of medieval persecution".

=== Heresies, schisms, and councils ===
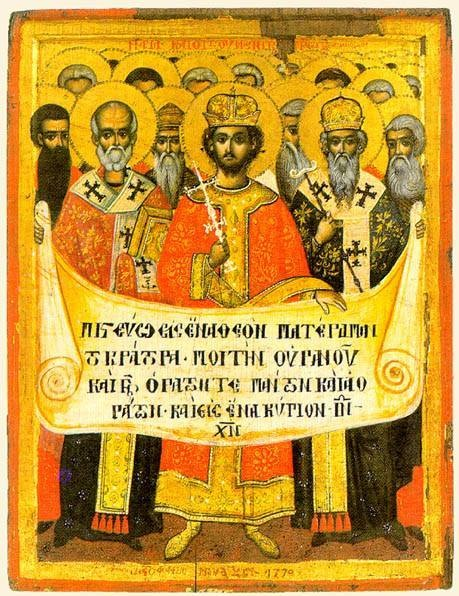
First Council of Nicaea icon from Protatos Church, 1770

Regional variants of Christianity produced diverse and sometimes competing theologies. Ancient Christians identified any practice or doctrine which differed from apostolic tradition as heresy. The number of laws directed at heresy indicate it was a much higher priority than paganism for Christians of this period.

For decades, Arianism embroiled the entire church, non-clergy and clergy alike, in arguing whether Jesus' divinity was of the same type as the Father's. The First Council of Nicaea (325) attempted to resolve the controversy with the Nicene Creed. Resolution went back and forth between Arians and non-Arians for the next 56 years.

Biblical commentators between 300 and 600 focused more on aiding ordinary Christians whose main concern was sin and salvation. Christian baptism was distinctive and demonstrated how Christians understood these concepts in terms of the death of Christ.

Christian scriptures were formalized as the New Testament and distinguished from the Old Testament by the fourth century. Despite agreement on these texts, differences between East and West were becoming evident. (Note: The West was solidly Nicean while the East was largely Arian. The West condemned Roman culture as sinful and resisted state control, whereas the East harmonized with Greek culture and aimed for unanimity between church and state. The marriage of clerics was accepted in the East but forbidden in the West. The East advocated sharing the government of the church between five church leaders, arguing that the Patriarchs of Constantinople, Alexandria, Antioch, and Jerusalem were equal to the Pope. Rome asserted that successors to Peter had superiority.)

Controversies over how Jesus' human and divine natures coexisted peaked when Nestorius declared Mary as the mother of Jesus' humanity, not his divinity, thereby giving Jesus two distinct natures. This led to a series of ecumenical councils: the Council of Ephesus was the church's third council, and it condemned Nestorius. Held in 431, the church in the Persian Empire refused to recognize its authority. This led to the first separation between East and West and cut off Syrian theologians and writers from the rest of Christendom. Two groups, one mostly Persian and the other Syrian, separated from Catholicism; Persians became the Church of the East (also known as the Assyrian, Nestorian, or Persian Church), while the majority of Christians in Syria and Mesopotamia became the Syrian Orthodox Church (Jacobite). (Note: The second group includes the (Syrian Church of Antioch), Syrian Church in India, Coptic Church in Egypt, Armenian Church, and Ethiopian Church.) The Church of the East lay almost entirely outside the Byzantine Empire. It became the principal Church in Asia in the Middle Ages.

In 451, the fourth council was the influential Council of Chalcedon. (Note: The Fifth was in 583, and the Sixth in 680–681. The seventh council of the church in 787, the Second Council of Nicaea, was the last one recognized as a general council by the Byzantine Church.) While most of Christianity accepted the Chalcedonian Definition, which emphasizes that the Son is "one person in two natures," there were those who found that description too close to the duality of Nestorianism, so after 484, they separated into Oriental Orthodoxy that sees only "One Nature of God the Incarnate Logos".

=== After 476 ===
After the political fall of the Western Roman Empire in 476, the Eastern Roman Empire continued to see itself as the Roman Empire, since it had an emperor, a civil government, and a large army. The religious policies of the Eastern Roman Emperor Justinian I (r. 527–565) reflected his conviction that the unity of the Empire presupposed unity of faith: he persecuted pagans and religious minorities, purging the government and church bureaucracies of any who disagreed with him. Justinian contributed to cultural development, and integrated Christian concepts with Roman law in his Corpus Juris Civilis, which remains the basis of civil law in many modern states. Until 751, the Pope was a subject of the Byzantine emperor.

After 476, European Christianity lost its imperial character and became increasingly localized. For the next five centuries, Western culture and civilization were primarily preserved and passed on by monks. In Gaul, the Frankish king Clovis I converted to Catholicism; his kingdom became the dominant polity in the West in 507, gradually converting into a Christian kingdom over the next centuries.

Pope Gregory I gained prestige and power for the papacy by leading the response to invasion by the Lombards in 592 and 593, by reforming the clergy, standardizing music in worship, sending out missionaries, founding new monasteries, and by forming attitudes and papal policy toward the Jews. There are 800 of Gregory's letters still in existence, and only 20 deal with the Jews, yet Gregory I was singularly influential concerning the Jews into the thirteenth century. Gregory ordered that Jews should not be molested, that they should be protected from violence, and permitted the free exercise of their religion. He expressed disapproval of forced conversion, and wrote the Sicut Judaeis granting them papal protection. He also expressed that Jews were full of perfidia (treachery) and unbelief, should be restrained from having authority over Christians, and must not be allowed equal status with Christians.

== Early Middle Ages (c. 600–1000) ==
By the early 600s, Christianity had spread around the Mediterranean. In this age of uncertainty, monasteries provided islands of safety, prayer, and scholarly pursuits. Relics and holy men able to provide special access to the divine were an ongoing source of wealth for monasteries, which became increasingly organized. They gradually established their own authority, separate from political and familial authorities, thereby revolutionizing social history.

Until the eighth century, most of Western Europe remained largely impoverished, politically fragmented, and dependent on the church. During this period, invasion, deportation, and neglect left some communities without a church, allowing Christianity to syncretize with local pagan traditions. Nevertheless, "Christendom", the notion of all Christians becoming united as a polity, emerged as a concept.

After the 600s, the Eastern empire was under almost constant siege from its Muslim neighbors. War on multiple fronts contributed to the Eastern Empire becoming the Byzantine Empire, though it gradually lost most of its lands until it fell to the Turks in 1453. Between 632 and 750, Islamic caliphates conquered the Middle East, North Africa, and the Iberian Peninsula. Most urban Asian churches disappeared, but some Christian communities in remote areas survived.

=== Monasticism and art ===
Until the end of the Early Middle Ages, Western culture was preserved and passed on primarily by monks known as "regular clergy" because they followed a regula: a rule. The rule included chastity, obedience and poverty sought through prayer, memorization of scripture, celibacy, fasting, manual labour, and almsgiving.

A page from a 15th-century book of hours (prayer book) with a decorated initial

Many monasteries served as orphanages and inns for travelers, and many provided food for those in need. What determined its focus was its location, the monastic order it belonged to, its economic resources, and its local leadership. Medieval monasteries were known for their public hospitals, hospices, and contributions to medicine. The sixth-century Rule of Saint Benedict also had a widespread influence. Monasteries supported literacy, practiced classical arts, crafts, and copied and preserved ancient texts creating illuminated manuscripts. From the sixth to the eighth centuries, most schools were connected to monasteries, but methods of teaching an illiterate populace could also include mystery plays, vernacular sermons, saints' lives in epic form, and artwork.

The East developed an approach to sacred art unknown in the West, adapting ancient portraiture in icons as intercessors between God and humankind. In the 720s, the Byzantine Emperor Leo banned the pictorial representation of Christ, saints, and biblical scenes, and destroyed much early representational art. The West condemned the Byzantine iconoclasm of Leo and some of his successors. By the tenth and early eleventh centuries, Byzantine culture began to recover its artistic heritage.

=== Regional differences ===
In 635, the Church of the East brought Christianity into China. Emperor Taizong decreed that the Christian faith was allowed and its license was copied onto the Sianfu stele. It spread into northwestern China, Khotan, Turfan, and south of Lake Balkash in southeastern Kazakhstan, but its growth was halted in 845 by Emperor Wuzong of Tang who favoured Taoism. The Church of the East evangelized all along the Silk Road and was instrumental in converting some of the Mongolic and Turkic peoples. After 700, when much of Christianity was declining, there were flourishing Christian societies along all the main trade routes of Asia, South India, the Nubian kingdoms, Ethiopia, and the Caucasus region.

In Western Europe, canon law was instrumental in developing key norms concerning oaths of loyalty, homage, and fidelity. These norms were incorporated into civil law where traces remain. Within the tenets of feudalism, the church created a new model of consecrated kingship unknown in the East, and in 800, Clovis' descendant Charlemagne became its recipient when Pope Leo III crowned him emperor. Charlemagne engaged in a number of reforms which began the Carolingian Renaissance, a period of intellectual and cultural revival. His crowning freed the Papacy from Byzantine control, and the former lands of the Exarchate became States of the church. However, the papacy was still in need of aid and protection. In Rome, the papacy came under the control of the city's aristocracy.

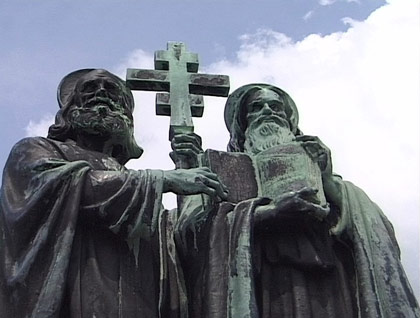
St. Cyril and St. Methodius monument on Mt. Radhošť, Czech Republic

Eastern Europe had been exposed to Christianity during Roman rule, but it was Byzantine Christianity, brought by the ninth-century saints Cyril and Methodius, that was integral to the formation of its modern states. Dukes and kings used the new faith to solidify their position and promote unity, while some directly enforced it with new laws, building churches, and establishing monasteries. The brothers developed the Glagolitic alphabet to translate the Bible into the local language, and their disciples then developed the Cyrillic script. This spread literacy and became the cultural and religious foundation for all Slavic nations.

In Russia, the baptism of Vladimir of Kiev in 989 is traditionally associated with the conversion of the Kievan Rus'. Their new religious structure included dukes maintaining control of a financially-dependent church. (Note: The prince appointed the clergy to positions in government service, satisfied their material needs, determined who would fill the higher ecclesiastical positions, and directed the synods of bishops in the Kievan metropolitanate.) Monasticism was the dominant form of piety for both peasants and elites who identified as Christian while retaining many pre-Christian practices.

Viking raids in the ninth and tenth centuries destroyed many churches and monasteries, inadvertently leading to reform. Patrons competed in rebuilding so that "by the mid-eleventh century, a wealthy, unified, better-organized, better-educated, more spiritually sensitive Latin Church" resulted. There was another rise in papal power in the tenth century when William IX, Duke of Aquitaine, and other powerful lay founders of monasteries, placed their institutions under the protection of the papacy.

== High Middle Ages (c. 1000–1300) ==
The High Middle Ages was a period of profound transformation for Christianity. The western church became centralized and assertive in its own defense, driven by papal reform, intellectual revival, and new religious movements. This period saw the formation of fundamental doctrines such as the seven sacraments, the "terms of Christian marriage, the nature of clerical celibacy, and the appropriate lifestyle for priests". Heresy was more precisely defined. Purgatory became an official doctrine. In 1215, confession became required. Voluntary poverty as a way of emulating Christ became a powerful influence.

=== Schism, spread, and retraction ===
The Church of the East, which had separated after Chalcedon, survived against the odds with help from Byzantium. At the height of its expansion in the thirteenth century, it stretched from Syria to eastern China and from Siberia to southern India and southern Asia. Along with geographical separation, there had long been many cultural differences, geopolitical disagreements, and a lack of respect between east and west. Their second separation took place in 1054 when the church within the Byzantine Empire formed Byzantine Eastern Orthodoxy, which thereafter remained in communion with the Ecumenical Patriarchate of Constantinople, not the Pope.

Christianity was declining in Mesopotamia and inner Iran. As churches in Egypt, Syria, and Iraq became subject to fervently Islamic militaristic regimes, Christians were designated as dhimmi, a status that guaranteed their protection but enforced their legal inferiority. Different communities adopted various survival strategies: some withdrew from interaction, others converted to Islam, and others sought outside help.

=== Crusade ===
The Byzantine emperor Alexios I Komnenos sought outside help with the Seljuk Turks from Pope Urban II in 1081. In 1095, Urban gave a public speech asking European Christians to "go to the aid of their brethren" in counterattack against the inroads of Islam.

Urban's message had great popular appeal. Drawing on powerful and prevalent aspects of folk religion, it connected pilgrimage, charity, and absolution with a willingness to fight. It gave ordinary Christians a tangible means of expressing brotherhood with the East and carried a sense of historical responsibility. Tens of thousands answered. Among the first was Peter the Hermit who led the People's Crusade to a disastrous end in 1096. Eight Crusades, which lasted from 1096 to 1272, had little to no overall military success, failed as a religious endeavor, contributed to the development of national identities in European nations and, eventually, increased division with the East. Scholars struggle with no agreement on estimates of how many died.

The cult of chivalry, which upheld the ideal of the Christian knight, emerged with powerful and wide-spread social and cultural influence before its decline during the 1400s. Another significant effect of the Crusades was the invention of the indulgence. Mary, mother of Jesus became a central aspect of the period.

The nobility of Eastern Europe prioritized subduing the Balts, the last major polytheistic population in Europe, over crusading in the Holy Land. (Note: These rulers saw crusade as a tool for territorial expansion, alliance building, and empowerment of their own nascent church and state.) In 1147, the Divina dispensatione gave these nobles indulgences for the first of the Northern Crusades, which intermittently continued, with and without papal support, until 1316. Forced conversions occurred despite continued theological emphasis on voluntary conversion.

=== Centralization and power struggles ===
The reform of Pope Gregory VII (1073–1085) began "a new period in church history" by pressing for an end to simony (the sale of church offices), the enforcement of clerical celibacy, and the establishment of papal supremacy. Reform enabled reorganization of the administration of the Papal States, which brought a substantial increase in wealth, consolidated territory, centralized authority, and established a bureaucracy.

Gregorian Reform was intended to free the church from state control and establish the preeminence of the church. After a prolonged period of interference from aristocrats, Pope Nicholas II moved to protect the papacy through his 1059 papal bull In nomine Domini, establishing that popes could only be elected by a College of Cardinals, however, nobles still claimed the right to appoint bishops and abbots. This led to the Investiture Controversy, a conflict between the Holy Roman Emperor Henry IV and Pope Gregory VII over the secular appointment of bishops and abbots and control of their revenues in the Holy Roman Empire. For the church, ending lay investiture would support independence from the state, encourage reform, and provide better pastoral care. For the kings, ending lay investiture meant the power of the Holy Roman Emperor and the European nobility would be reduced.

The Dictatus Papae of 1075 declared that the pope alone could invest bishops. Disobedience to the Pope became equated with heresy; when Henry IV rejected the decree, he was excommunicated, which contributed to a civil war. A similar controversy occurred in England. Struggles over division of power between church and state continued throughout the medieval era.

=== Monks and Cathars ===
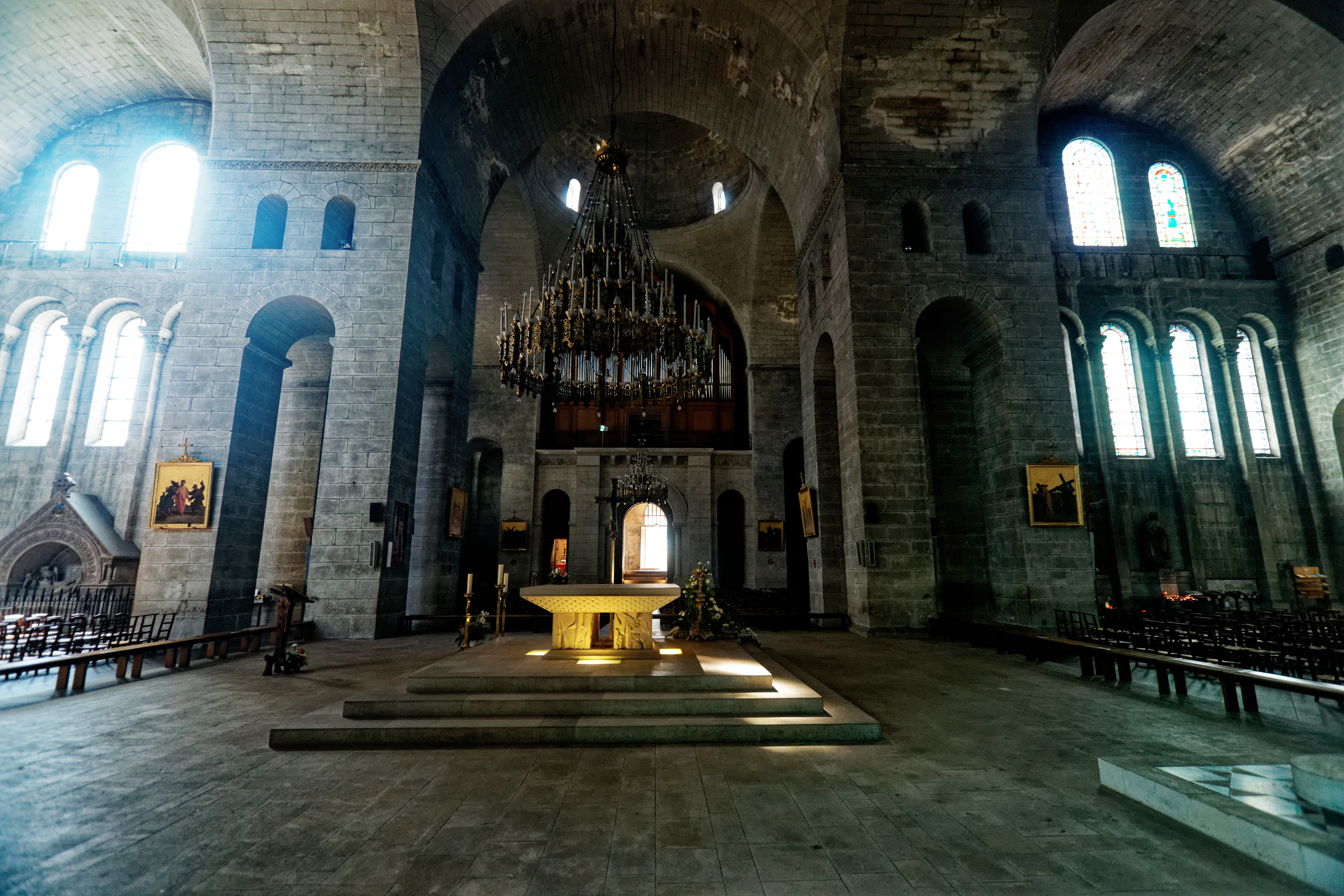
Romanesque architecture preserved in the French Périgueux Cathedral

Beginning at Cluny Abbey, which used Romanesque architecture to convey a sense of awe and wonder and inspire obedience, monasteries gained influence through the Cluniac Reforms. (Note: During this same period, the monk Guido of Arezzo created the music staff of lines and spaces and named musical notes, making modern music possible.)

The Cistercian movement was a wave of monastic reform after 1098. Cistercians were instrumental in promoting technological advancement and were among the best industrialists of the Middle Ages. Of the 740 twelfth-century Cistercian monasteries, nearly all possessed a water wheel used to develop innovative hydraulic engineering techniques, water circulation systems for central heating, produce olive oil or forge metal and produce iron. They taught and practiced advanced farming techniques, such as crop rotation, and were skilled metallurgists.

The twelfth century saw a change in the goal of a monk from contemplative to active reformer. Among these new activist preachers was Dominic. He founded the Dominican Order in 1216 and was significant in opposing Catharism. In 1209, Pope Innocent III and King Philip II of France initiated the Albigensian Crusade against Catharism. The campaign took a political turn when the king's army seized and occupied strategic lands of nobles who had not supported the heretics but had instead been in the good graces of the Church. It ended in 1229 with a treaty which brought the region under the rule of the French king, creating southern France, while Catharism continued until 1350.

=== Persecution of minorities ===
The cultural and religious dominance of monks began to decline in the mid-eleventh century when secular clergy and courtiers became "more literate, more worldly, and more self-assertive". (Note: The parish emerged as one of the fundamental institutions of medieval Europe. After the eleventh century, education began at home, then continued in the parish of one's birth instead of in the monastery. The parish priest (secular clergy) celebrated the liturgy, visited the sick, instructed the young, gave aid to the poor, ministered to the dying, and monitored and maintained his parish's income from land, livestock, rents and tithes.) The practice of canon and civil law became professionalized. Monastery schools lost influence as cathedral schools spread, and independent schools arose. Universities formed as self-governing corporations.

Between 950 and 1250, the interests and concerns of this new class of functionaries led to the systematic “socially sanctioned" persecution of minorities. Newly centralized states demanded an increasing cultural conformity from citizens, while the church wrote new canon laws that left out Christianity's earlier principles of equity and inclusivity.

The church did not repudiate its doctrine of protecting the Jews, however, in the 12th and 13th centuries, crusading, prohibitions against money lending, condemnation of the Talmud, increasing pressure from the common folk, the growth of polemical literature, and the creation of the mendicant orders, made it difficult for the papacy to retain its earlier Pauline/Augustinian theology of tolerance toward the Jews.

A turning point in Jewish-Christian relations occurred when the Talmud was put "on trial" in 1239 by the French King Louis IX and Pope Gregory IX. Talmudic Judaism came to be seen as so different from biblical Judaism that old Augustinian obligations to leave Jews alone no longer applied. Throughout the medieval era, local rulers evicted Jews from their lands and confiscated their property. Supersessionism was never a formal doctrine of the church, but it was a popular belief among the common people, and other popular legends, such as blood libel and the accusation that Jews had poisoned wells during the plague and desecrated the Christian eucharist, spread paranoia about the Jews.

Jews had often acted as financial agents for the nobility, which freed them from certain financial obligations and attracted jealousy and resentment. Count Emicho of Leiningen massacred Jews in search of supplies and protection money, while the York massacre of 1190 also appears to have originated in a conspiracy by local leaders to liquidate their debts.

The Papacy officially dissociated itself from such popular antisemitism; six Popes in the 12th century and ten in the 13th century reissued Gregory the Great's proclamation of protection, the Sicut Judaeis. The papacy's unequivocal condemnation of forced baptism led to clashes with secular authorities over the Jews. Yet, the proposed solution remained conversion, which produced a different condemnation from the church concerning Jewish "stubbornness".

=== Inquisition ===
Pope Innocent III initiated the Medieval Inquisition, which lasted from 1184 to the 1230s, to prosecute crimes for which there were no eyewitnesses, such as murder, sexual misconduct of the clergy, heresy, and witchcraft. These courts were established when someone was accused, and afterwards dissolved. Though these courts had no joint leadership or organization, the Dominican Order held primary responsibility for conducting inquisitions. Inquisitorial procedure guarded the rights of due process, while at the same time trials for exceptional crimes such as treason, heresy, and sorcery, allowed judges to suspend the accused's rights. Between 8,000 and 40,000 people were brought before the courts. The penalty imposed most often was an act of penance, which might include public confession, and death sentences were rare.

The Medieval Inquisition was dependent upon the civil courts. Bishops were the lead inquisitors, but they did not possess absolute power, nor were they universally supported. Public opposition and riots against the Dominicans occurred. In theory, the Fourth Lateran Council of 1215 granted inquisitors extraordinary powers, but in practice, without sufficient local secular support, their task became so difficult that inquisitors were endangered and some were murdered.

=== Renaissance, science and technology ===
The Christian wars of reconquest began in 711 and lasted until 1492. It sometimes caused fleeing Muslims to leave their libraries behind. Between 1150 and 1200, monks searched those libraries and found the works of Aristotle, Euclid, and other ancient writers.

The West's rediscovery of the complete works of Aristotle led to the Renaissance of the twelfth century. It also created conflict between faith and reason. Thomas Aquinas resolved the conflict through a "middle way" revolution in thought called scholasticism that impacted Catholic theology and influenced secular philosophy and law into the modern day.

Monks also responded to Aristotle by reviving the scientific study of natural phenomena, which laid the necessary foundation for the Scientific Revolution in the West. There was no parallel in the East.

Byzantine art exerted a powerful influence on Western art in the twelfth and thirteenth centuries. Gothic architecture, intended to inspire contemplation of the divine, began in the same centuries.

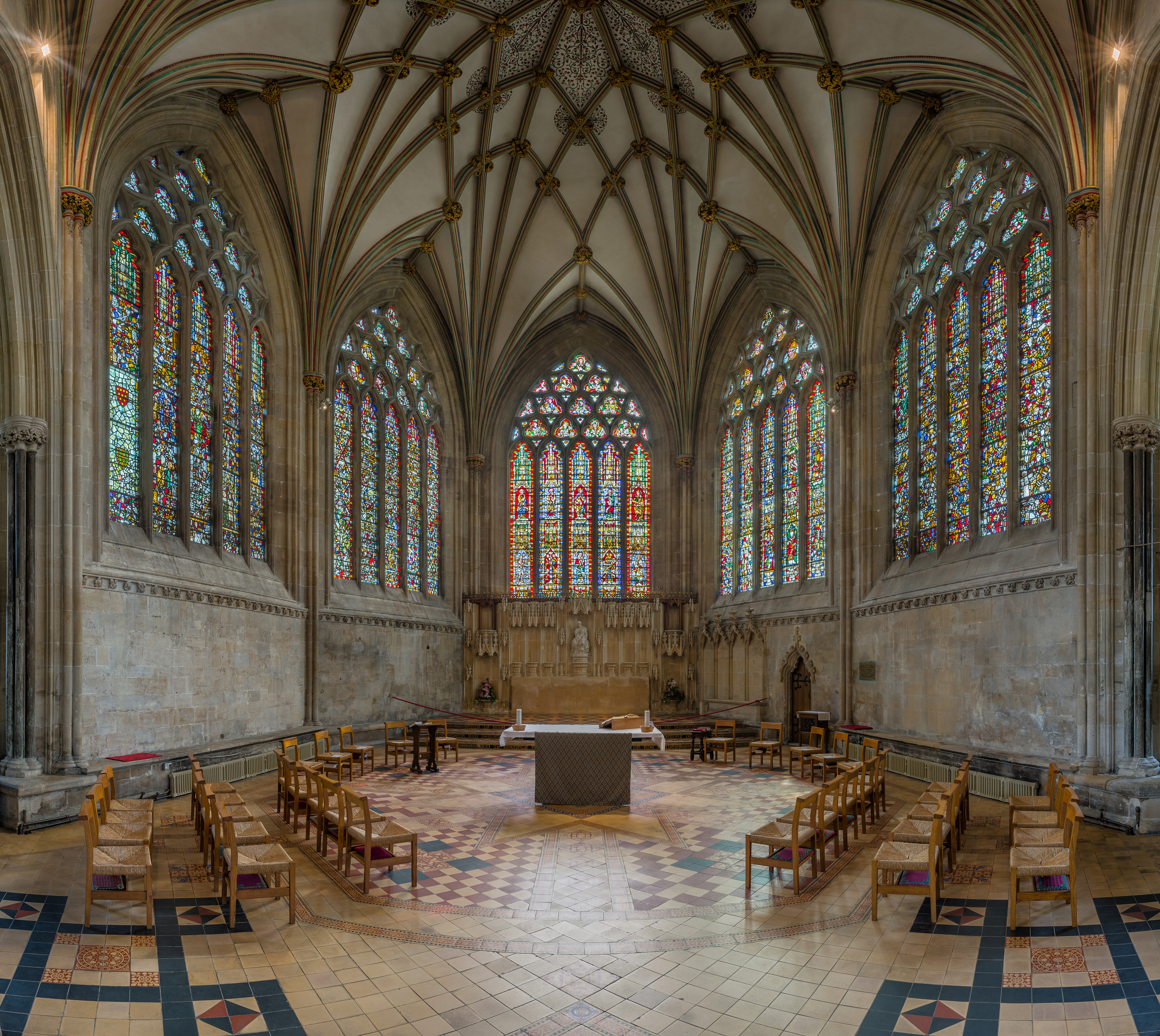
Gothic architecture of the Lady Chapel of Wells Cathedral in Somerset, England

The Christianization of Scandinavia occurred in two stages: first, in the ninth century, missionaries operated without secular support; then, a secular ruler would begin to oversee Christianization in their territory until an organized ecclesiastical network was established. By 1350, Scandinavia was an integral part of Western Christendom.

== Renaissance and Reformation (c. 1300–1650) ==
=== Division in the West ===
The many calamities of the "long fourteenth century", which included plague, famine, wars, and social unrest, led European people to believe the end of the world was imminent. This belief ran throughout society and became intertwined with anti-clerical and anti-papal sentiments. (Note: Some claimed that the clergy did little to help the suffering, although the high mortality rate amongst clerics indicates that many continued to care for the sick. Other medieval folk claimed it was the "corrupted" and "vice-ridden" clergy that had caused the many calamities they believed were punishments from God.) Criticism of the church became an integral part of late medieval European life, and was expressed in both secular and religious writings, and movements of heresy or internal reform. Most attempts at reform between 1300 and 1500 failed.

In 1309, Pope Clement V fled Rome's factional politics by moving to Avignon in southern France. By leaving Rome and the "seat of Peter" behind, this Avignon Papacy, consisting of seven successive popes, unintentionally diminished papal prestige and power. Pope Gregory XI returned to Rome in 1377. After Gregory's death the following year, the papal conclave elected Urban VI to succeed him, but the French cardinals disapproved and elected Robert of Geneva instead. This began the Western Schism, during which there was more than one pope. In 1409, the Council of Pisa's attempted resolution resulted in the election of a third separate pope. The schism was finally resolved in 1417, with the election of Pope Martin V.

Throughout the Late Middle Ages, the church faced powerful challenges and vigorous political confrontations. The English scholastic philosopher John Wycliffe (1320–1384) urged the church to embrace its original simplicity, give up its property and wealth, end subservience to secular politics, and deny papal authority. Wycliffe's teachings were condemned as heresy, but he was allowed to live out the last two years of his life in his home parish. In 1382, the first English translation of the Bible, known as Wycliffe's Bible, was published. Wycliffe's teachings influenced the Czech theologian Jan Hus (1369–1415) who also spoke out against what he saw as corruption in the church. Hus was convicted of heresy and burned at the stake. This was the impetus for the Bohemian Reformation and led to the Hussite Wars.

Meanwhile, a vernacular religious culture called the Devotio Moderna attempted to work toward a pious society of ordinary people. (Note: In 1320, Dante Alighieri completed the Divine Comedy, a Christian allegory of reason and divine revelation, sin and ultimate truth, using Catholic doctrine on Hell, Purgatory, and Paradise. It became one of the greatest works in literary history.) Through the Dutch scholar Desiderius Erasmus Roterodamus (1466–1536), Christian humanism grew and impacted literature and education. Between 1525 and 1534, William Tyndale used the Vulgate and Greek texts from Erasmus to create the Tyndale Bible. King James commissioned the King James Version in 1604, using all previous versions in Latin, Greek, and English as sources. It was published in 1611.

=== East and Renaissance ===
In 14th-century Byzantium, St. Gregory Palamas, defended hesychast spirituality (a mystical tradition that seeks union with God through interior quietude), and the Orthodox understanding of God, against the criticisms of Barlaam a Calabrian humanist philosopher, by writing his most influential work, "Triads", in 1341.

A reunion agreement between the Orthodox and Catholic churches in 1452 was negated by the Fall of Constantinople to the Ottoman Empire in 1453, which sealed off Orthodoxy from the West for more than a century. Islamic law did not acknowledge the Byzantine church as an institution, but a concern for societal stability allowed it to survive. Financial handicaps, constant upheaval, simony, and corruption impoverished many, and made conversion an attractive solution. This led to the state confiscating churches and turning them into mosques. The patriarchate became a part of the Ottoman system under Suleiman the Magnificent (1520–1566), and by the end of the sixteenth century, widespread desperation and low morale had produced crisis and decline. When Cyril I Loukaris (1572 – 1638) became Patriarch in 1620, he began leading the church toward renewal. A shared hostility towards Catholicism led Cyril to reach out to the Protestants of Europe and to be deeply impacted by their Reformation doctrines. Protestant pressure produced the Lukaris Confession embracing Calvinism.

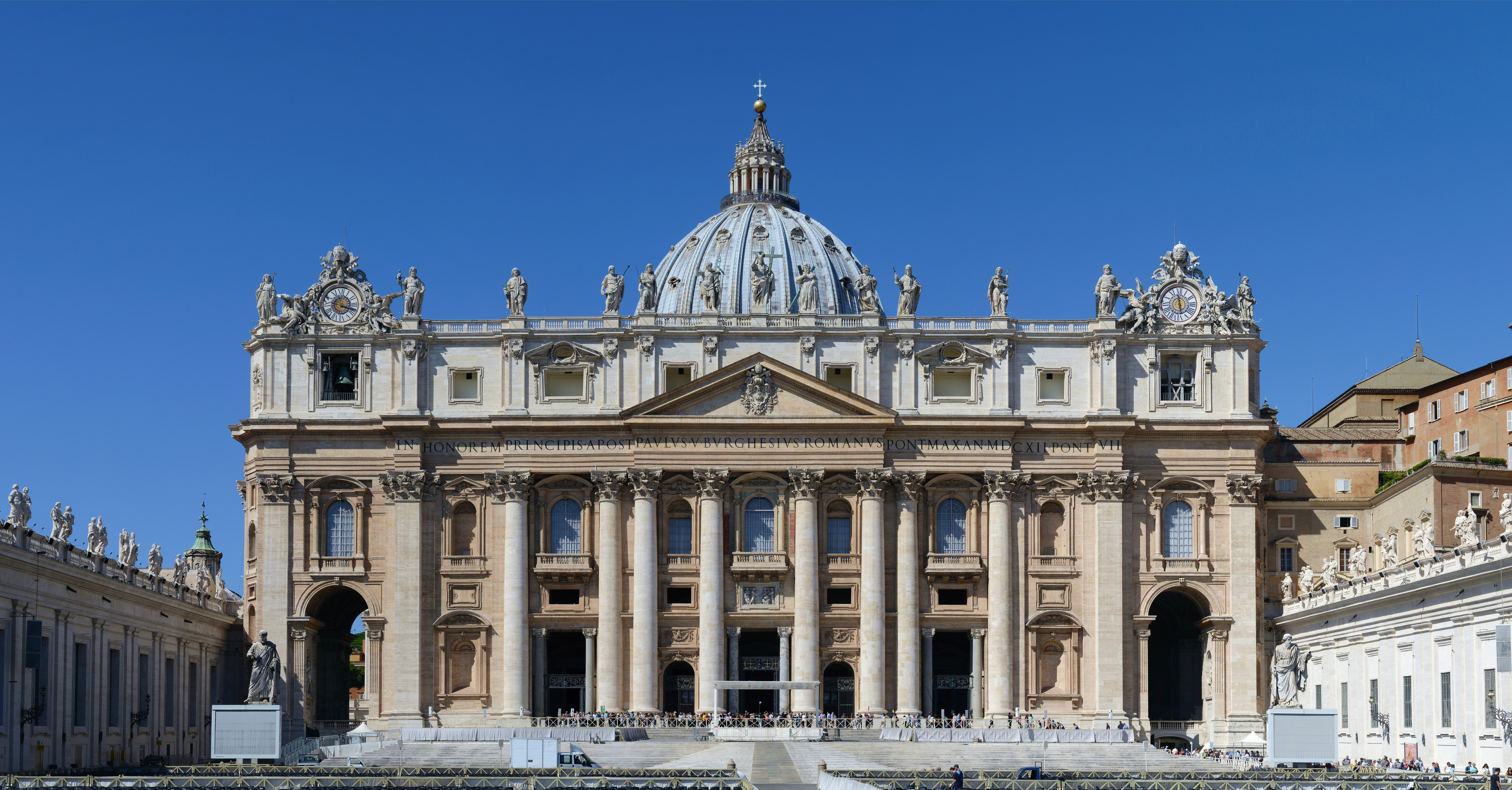
The facade of St. Peter's Basilica in the Vatican City.

The flight of Eastern Christians from Constantinople, as well as the manuscripts they carried with them, were important factors in stimulating literary renaissance in the West. The Catholic Church became a leading patron of art and architecture, commissioning work and supporting renowned artists. Even while fifteenth-century popes struggled to reestablish papal authority, the Renaissance Papacy transformed Rome by rebuilding St. Peter's Basilica and establishing the city as a prestigious centre of learning. Reformation Protestants condemned these popes as corrupt for their lack of chastity, nepotism, and selling "hats and indulgences".

In Russia, Ivan III of Russia adopted the style of the Byzantine imperial court to gain support among the Rus' elite who saw themselves as the new 'chosen' and Moscow as the New Jerusalem. Jeremias II (1536–1595), the first Orthodox patriarch to visit north-eastern Europe, founded the Orthodox Patriarchate of Russia during his journey.

The sixteenth-century success of Christianity in Japan was followed by severe repression, such as the crucifixion of the 26 Martyrs of Japan.

=== Colonialism and missions ===
Beginning in the fifteenth century, colonialism originated on a militaristic/political path, a commercial one, or with settlers who wanted land. Christianity provided the early moral rationale for what governments were already doing, however, Christian missionaries generally had a separate agenda. Missionaries promoted human development and provided healthcare and education, which colonial governments were unwilling, or unable, to provide, making relations between missionaries and colonial governments antagonistic.

Some early Catholic missionaries worked against those of the military, landowners, trading companies, and traders who took advantage of natives. They created important debate about "the status and nature of human beings, voiced forceful denunciations of the ill-treatment of indigenous peoples in the Americas, and prompted new laws and measures aimed at controlling abuses".

Missionaries sometimes relied on colonial governments for protection, transportation, and status, and thereby benefitted from the exploitation inherent in political colonialism. Those who accepted the social views of the day, which saw Western culture as superior, encouraged the adoption of European practices and values to the detriment of indigenous customs and the disruption of local societies. Some even participated in forced relocation programs and boarding school systems that separated children from their families and cultures. (Note: Between 1500 and 1800, Catholic Christianity gained followers worldwide through missionaries from the Spanish, Portuguese, and French empires. During the Hispanic colonization of the Americas, Latin America largely became a New World form of Iberian Catholicism, while the merging of native and Spanish traditions also created a multitude of indigenous Christianities. In the Spanish dominions, the court attempted to limit abuses. Jesuits tried to suppress the trade in Amerindian slaves in the Caribbean, but became one of the largest holders of black slaves.)

Similar numbers of missionaries opposed colonialism. Some actively worked to maintain the rights of indigenous peoples, advocated for their protection, and opposed oppressive colonial policies. These missionaries respected local cultural structures, maintained local language and customs, and advocated for a "self-supporting, self-governing, and self-propagating church". Missionaries like John Mackenzie fought for equal legal protection and protected native lands. Some of them can be seen as the forerunners of today's human-rights-advocates smuggling out reports of colonial abuses to their media contacts willing to expose injustices. Religious societies such as the Moravians and the Quakers opposed slavery and worked toward abolition.

=== Women, witch frenzy, and Modern Inquisition ===
Women in the Middle Ages were considered incapable of moral judgment and authority. (Note: Women had no access to education within institutions associated with the church, such as cathedral schools and most universities. The boundary between men and women was absolute in clerical matters. The church often used the participation of women to demonize movements deemed heretical.) However, there were women who became distinguished leaders of nunneries, exercising the same powers and privileges as their male counterparts, such as Hildegard of Bingen (d. 1179), Elisabeth of Schönau (d. 1164/65), and Marie d'Oignies (d. 1213). Hildegard began writing the first of her three-volume theology in 1141.

Although the Catholic Church had long ruled that witches did not exist, the conviction that witches were both real and malevolent developed throughout fifteenth-century European society. No single cause of the "witch frenzy" which followed is known, although the Little Ice Age is thought to have been a factor. Between 100,000 and 200,000 people were accused most often by fellow villagers. Approximately 80% of the accused were women; most were acquitted; most trials were civil trials. Inquisitions lessened the impact by requiring strict evidence. From 1561 to 1670, it is estimated that between 40,000 and 50,000 people were executed.

Between 1478 and 1542, the Spanish and Portuguese inquisitions were initially authorized by the church but soon became state institutions. Authorized by Pope Sixtus IV in 1478, the Spanish Inquisition was established to combat fears that Jewish converts were conspiring with Muslims to sabotage the new state. Five years later, a papal bull conceded control of the Spanish Inquisition to Spanish monarchs, making it the first national, unified, centralized institution of the nascent Spanish state. The monarchy centralized state power by absorbing and adapting military orders, Inquisitorial courts and police organizations for political purposes.

The Portuguese Inquisition, controlled by a state board of directors, incorporated anti-Judaism before the end of the fifteenth century. Many of these forcibly converted Jews, known as New Christians, fled to Portuguese colonies in India, where they subsequently suffered as targets of the Goa Inquisition. The bureaucratic and intellectual Roman Inquisition, best known for its condemnation of Galileo, served the papacy's political aims in Italy.

=== Reformation ===
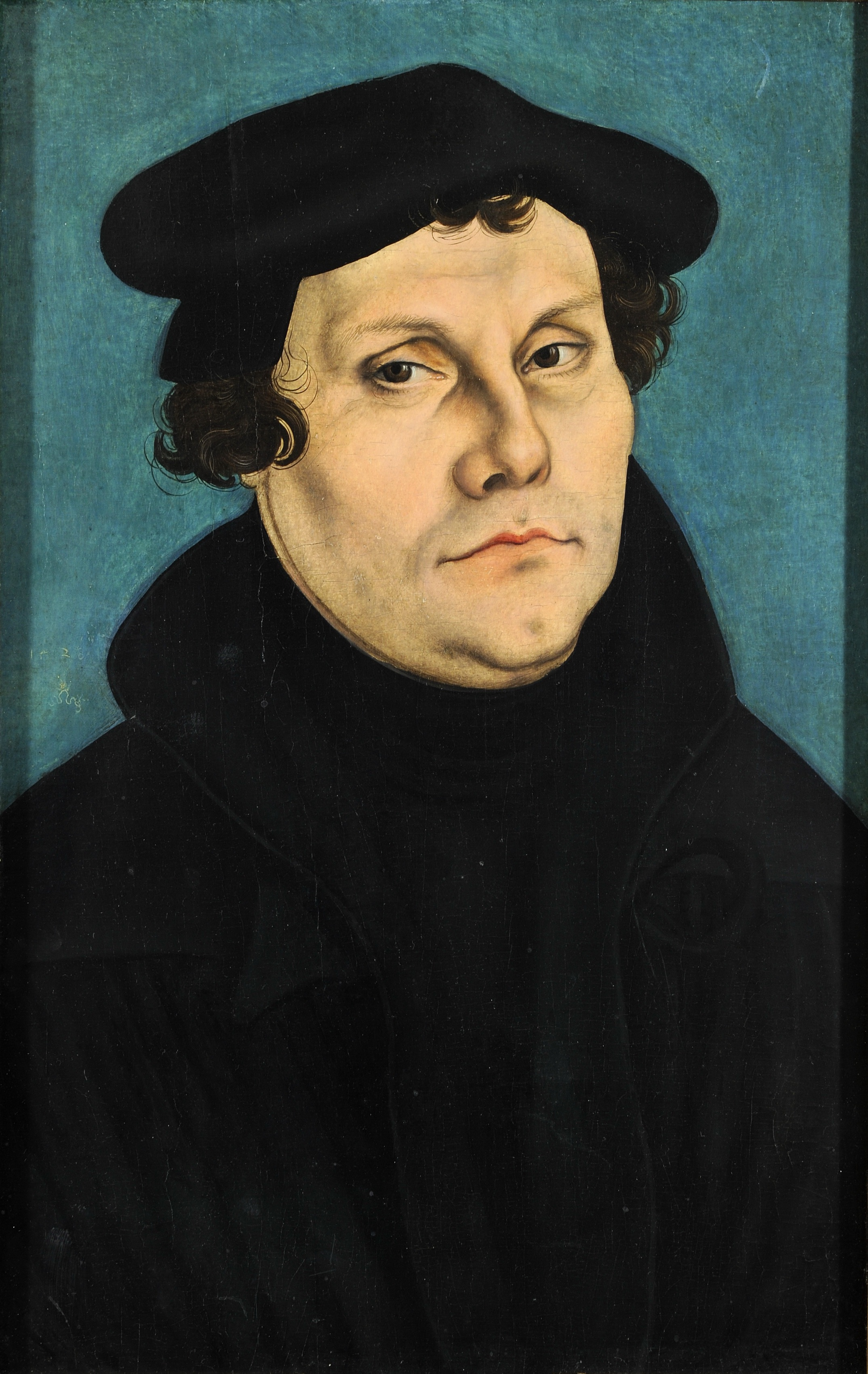
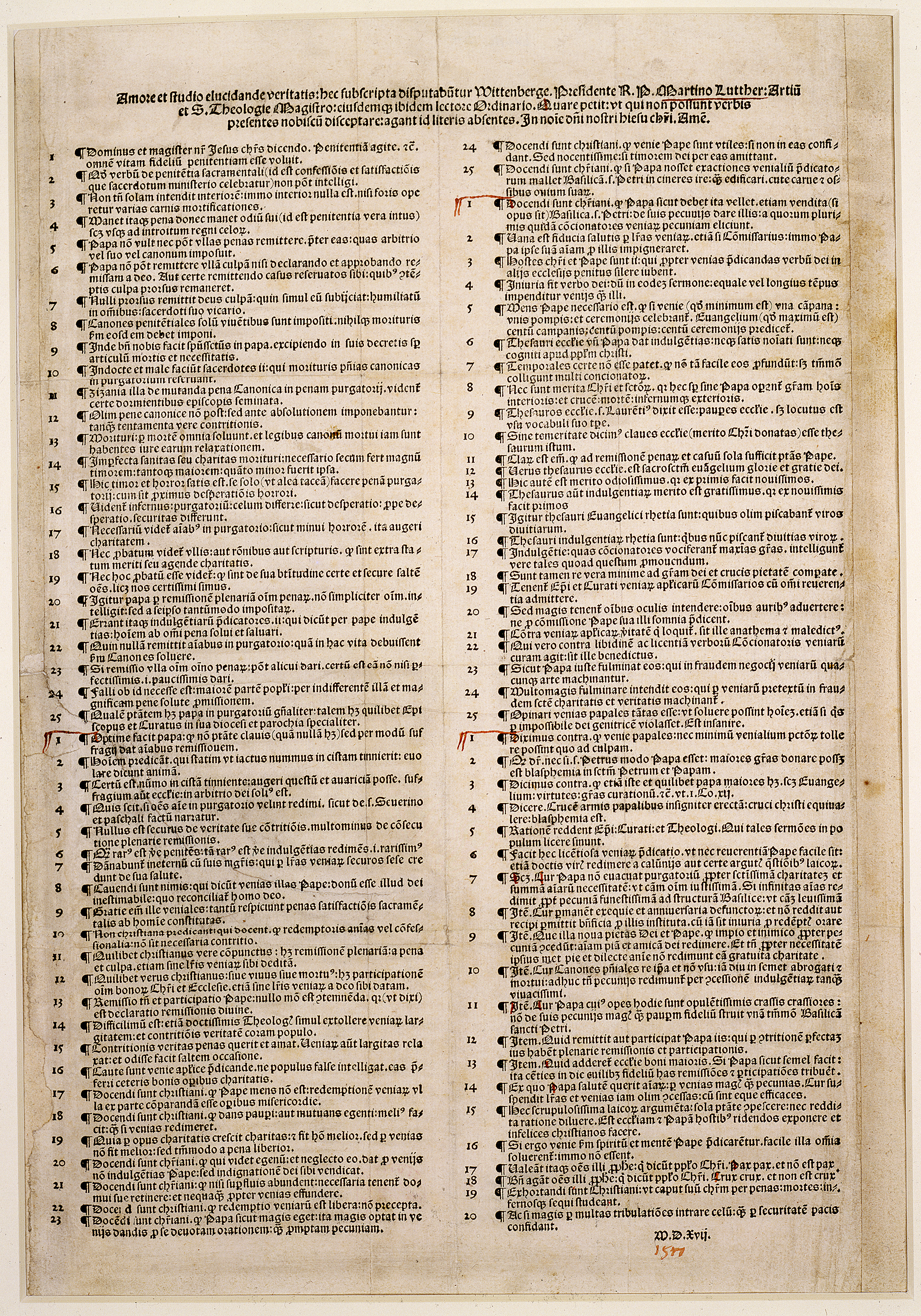
In 1517, Martin Luther initiated the Reformation with his Ninety-five Theses.

Protests against the church led to the Protestant Reformation which began in 1517 when the Catholic monk Martin Luther nailed his Ninety-five Theses to the church door in Wittenberg. Luther challenged the nature of the church's role in society and its authority. For Catholics, authority meant the Pope. For the protesters, authority was found in the priesthood of believers and in Scripture. Luther asserted there were two realms of human existence, the secular and the sacred, that neither should be allowed to dominate the other, and only secular authority had the right to use force. Edicts issued at the Diet of Worms in 1521 condemned Luther.

After protracted and acrimonious struggle, three religious traditions emerged alongside Roman Catholicism: the Lutheran, Reformed, and Anglican traditions. Reformed churches, formed by followers of theologian John Calvin, argued that the church had the right to function without interference from the state, and they advocated for a constitutional representative government in both the church and in society. Puritans and other Dissenter groups in England, Huguenots in France, "Beggars" in Holland, Covenanters in Scotland who produced Presbyterianism, and Pilgrim Fathers of New England are Reformed churches that trace their theological roots to Calvin. The Anglican church was first created as the Church of England by Henry VIII (1491 – 1547) who severed it from papal authority and appointed himself Supreme Head of the Church of England. Henry preserved Catholic doctrine and the church's established role in society.

The Roman Catholic Church responded in the Counter-Reformation, spearheaded by ten reforming popes between 1534 to 1605. The Council of Trent (1545–1563) answered each Protestant claim and laid the foundation of modern Catholic policies. New monastic orders were formed, including the Society of Jesus – the "Jesuits" – who adopted military-style discipline and strict loyalty to the Pope. Monastic reform also led to the Spanish mystics and the French school of spirituality, as well as the Uniate church which used Eastern liturgy but recognized the authority of Rome.

Quarreling royal houses, already involved in dynastic disagreements, became polarized into the two religious camps. In 1562, France became the centre of a series of wars, of which the largest and most destructive was the Thirty Years' War (1618–1648). While some scholars argue that these wars were varieties of the just war tradition for religious liberty and freedom, most historians argue that the wars were also about nationalistic state-building and economics.

== Modern period (1650–1945) ==
=== Ideological movements ===
The era of political absolutism followed the breakdown of Christian universalism in Europe. Abuses from absolutist Catholic kings gave rise to a virulent critique of Christianity that first emerged among the more extreme Protestant reformers in the 1680s as an aspect of the Age of Enlightenment. For 200 years, Protestants had been arguing for religious toleration, and by the 1690s, secular thinkers were rethinking the state's reasons for persecution, and they too began advocating for religious toleration. Concepts of freedom of religion, speech, and thought began being established in the West.

Secularisation spread at every level of European society. Pioneered by Protestants, Biblical criticism advocated historicism and rationalism to make study of the Bible more scholarly and secular in the 1700s. In reaction to rationalism, pietism, a holiness movement within Lutheranism, began in Europe and spread to the Thirteen Colonies where it contributed to the First Great Awakening, a religious revival of the 1700s. Pietist Moravians came to Georgia in 1732 where they influenced John Wesley, an Anglican missionary in Savannah. After returning to England, Wesley began preaching in open-air meetings, leading to the creation of the Methodist church. In the colonies, Presbyterians and Baptists contributed to revival, and to divisions over it, which formed political parties and lent crucial support for the American Revolution. Some radical revolutionaries violently sought the dechristianization of France during the French Revolution leading the Eastern Orthodox Church to reject Enlightenment ideas as too dangerous to embrace.

The rise of Protestantism contributed to belief in the value of human capital, the Protestant work ethic, the European state system, modern capitalism, and overall economic growth. However, urbanization and industrialisation created a plethora of new social problems. In Europe and North America, both Protestants and Catholics provided massive aid to the poor, supported family welfare, and offered medicine and education.

=== Nineteenth and twentieth centuries ===
The Second Great Awakening - a religious revival of the 1800s–1830s - produced Mormonism, Restorationism, and the Holiness movement. Mormons preached the restoration of first-century Christianity and sought to create a religious utopia. Restorationists, such as the Churches of Christ, Jehovah's Witnesses, and Seventh Day Adventists, also focused on restoring practices of the early church. The Holiness movement focused on avoiding sin. It contributed to the later development of Pentecostalism, typified by the 1906 Azusa Street Revival, by combining Restorationism with the goal of sanctification defined as a deeper spiritual experience.

This revival focused on evidencing conversion through active moral reform in areas such as women's rights, temperance, literacy, and the abolition of slavery. The pursuit of women's rights established "prayer, worship, and biblical exegesis as weapons of political warfare". Women were involved in temperance reform from the early 1800s. Concern for women who suffered at the hands of drunkards was a recurrent theme of temperance literature which used moral persuasion to effect change. In Maine of 1851, the power of the state to effect immediate social change overshadowed such efforts, and temperance became prohibition: a political movement. The Woman's Christian Temperance Union (WCTU) was founded in 1874; many supporters went on to contribute to the women's rights movement.

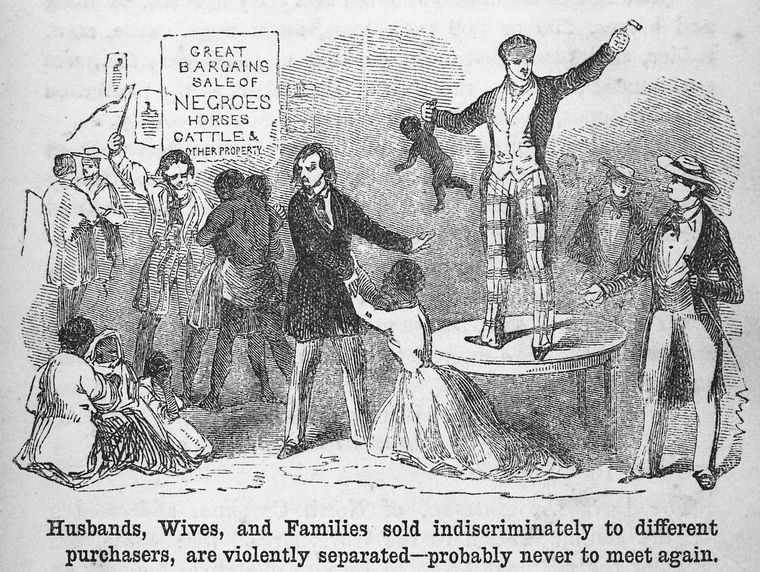
American anti-slavery tract, 1853

The 300-year-old trans-Atlantic slave trade, in which some Christians had participated, had always garnered moral objections, and by the eighteenth century, individual Quakers, Methodists, Presbyterians, and Baptists began a written campaign against it. Congregations led by black preachers kept abolitionism alive into the early nineteenth century when some American Protestants organized the first anti-slavery societies. This ideological opposition eventually ended the trans-Atlantic slave trade, changing economic and human history on three continents.

The Third Great Awakening began in 1857 and took root throughout the world, especially in English-speaking countries, contributing to a surge of missionary zeal. Nineteenth-century Protestant missionaries, many of them women, played a significant role in shaping nations and societies. They translated the Bible into local languages, generating a written grammar, a lexicon of native traditions, and a dictionary of the local language. These were used to teach in missionary schools, resulting in the spread of literacy and indigenization. According to historian Lamin Sanneh, Protestant missionaries thus stimulated the "largest, most diverse and most vigorous movement of cultural renewal" in African history.

Liberal Christians embraced seventeenth-century rationalism, but its disregard of faith and ritual in maintaining Christianity led to its decline. Fundamentalist Christianity rose in the early 1900s as a reaction against modern rationalism. By 1930, Protestant fundamentalism in America appeared to be dying. However, in the second half of the 1930s, a theology against liberalism that also included a reevaluation of Reformation teachings began uniting moderates of both sides.

World War I profoundly impacted Christianity. In response, in 1938, the World Council of Churches (WCC) formed to address social issues, create cooperation, and open a dialogue among Christians on a global scale. The WCC played an important role in the Universal Declaration of Human Rights in 1948.

The Roman Catholic Church became increasingly centralized, conservative, and focused on loyalty to the Pope. As Nazism rose, Pope Pius XI declared the irreconcilability of the Catholic position with totalitarian fascist states that placed the nation above God. Most leaders and members of the largest Protestant church in Germany, the German Evangelical Church, supported the Nazi Party when they came to power in 1933. About a third of German Protestants formed the Confessing Church which opposed Nazism; its members were harassed, arrested, and otherwise targeted. In Poland, Catholic priests were arrested and Polish priests and nuns were executed en masse.

=== Russian Orthodoxy ===
The church reform of Peter I of Russia in the early 1700s placed the Orthodox authorities under the control of the emperor. Russian emperors continually involved the church in campaigns of russification, contributing to antisemitism. The communist revolutionaries who established the Soviet Union saw the Church as an enemy of the people and part of the monarchy. The communist Soviet Union heavily persecuted the Russian Orthodox Church, executing up to 8,000 people by 1922. The League of Militant Atheists adopted a five-year plan in 1932 "aimed at the total eradication of religion by 1937". Despite this, the Orthodox Church continued to contribute to theology and culture.

== After World War II ==
=== Worldwide ===
Global distribution of Christians based on 2011 Pew Research Center data

After WWII, decolonization strengthened the indigenization efforts of Christian missionaries, leading to explosive growth in the churches of many former colonies. In sub-Saharan Africa of 1900, about six and a half percent of the total population were Christian (Christians numbered just under nine million out of the total population of 140 million). By 1960, this increased to just under 21%: 60 million out of a total population of 286.7 million. By 2005, the percentage of Christians in Africa was about half of the continent's population, which remained consistent into 2022.

Before 1945, about a third of the people in the world were Christians, and about 80% of them lived in Europe, Russia, and the Americas. In 2025, Christians remain at the same approximate proportion, with 31% of adults around the world declaring themselves Christian, but they are no longer concentrated in the West. Christianity has declined in Europe and America. From 2019 to 2024, the Christian share of the adult population in the United States was between 60% and 64%. It is estimated that fewer than a quarter of the world's Christians will live in its western locations by 2060.

According to PEW, religion is very important to people in Africa, the Middle East, South Asia, and Latin America where populations are growing and are likely to continue to grow. Combined with Western decline, the geographic center of Christianity is shifting to sub-Saharan Africa where more than forty percent of the world's Christians are projected to live by 2060.

Christianity in Southeast and East Asia, especially Korea, grew faster after colonialism ended. Rapid expansion began in the 1980s. The Council on Foreign Relations reports that the number of Chinese Protestants has grown by an average of 10% annually since 1979, with growth especially prominent among young people.

With the Fall of the Eastern Bloc, Christianity expanded in some Eastern European countries while declining in others. Catholic countries have displayed secularization, while Orthodox countries have experienced a revival of church participation. Orthodox Christianity made a partial resurgence in the former Soviet Union after 1991 and continues to be an important element of national identity for many citizens there.

In the first quarter of the twenty-first century, Christianity is present in all seven continents and a multitude of different cultures. Diverse and pluralist, it embraces over three thousand of the world's languages through "Bible translation, prayer, liturgy, hymns, and literature". Most Christians live outside North America and Western Europe; white Christians are a global minority, and slightly over half of worldwide Christians are female. In 2017, PEW reported that Christianity is the world's largest religion with roughly 2.4 billion followers, equal to 31.2% of the world's population.

=== Modern movements ===
The Second Vatican Council (Vatican II), from 1962-1965, brought about numerous reforms, liturgical changes, promoted the involvement of laypeople, and improved relations with other Christian denominations.

In 1992, the Catholic Church and the Lutheran World Federation signed the Joint Declaration on the Doctrine of Justification. Roman Catholic ecumenical goals are to re-establish full communion amongst all the various Christian churches, but there is no agreement amongst evangelicals. There is, however, a trend at the local level toward discussion, pulpit exchanges, and shared social action. Less than 40% of Orthodox Christians favor reconciliation with the Roman Catholic Church. Orthodox Christians of the Greek, Russian and Balkans branches tend to be more conservative on most issues than Protestants and Catholics.

In the last quarter of the twentieth century, Christianity faced the challenges of secularism and a changing moral climate concerning sexual ethics, gender, and exclusivity, leading to a decline in church attendance in the West. In a 2018 PEW survey of 27 countries, the majority of nations had more residents claim that the role of religion has decreased over the preceding twenty years than said it had increased. However, people in Southeast Asian and Sub-Saharan African countries reported the opposite trend, suggesting that secularization is a region-specific trend.

In 2000, approximately one-quarter of all Christians worldwide were part of Pentecostalism and its associated movements. By 2025, Pentecostals are expected to constitute one-third of the nearly three billion Christians worldwide, making it the largest branch of Protestantism and fastest-growing Christian movement.

The three main branches of Eastern Christianity are the Eastern Orthodox Church, Oriental Orthodox Communion, and Eastern Catholic Church. Roughly half of Eastern Orthodox Christians live in formerly Eastern Bloc countries. Its oldest communities in Jerusalem, Antioch, Alexandria, Constantinople, and Georgia, are decreasing due to forced migration from religious persecution. In 2020, 57 countries had "very high" levels of government restrictions on religion, banning or giving preferential treatment to particular groups, prohibiting conversions, and limiting preaching. As of 2022, Christians were harassed in 166 countries, compared to Muslims in 148 and Jews in 90. Anti-Christian persecution has become a consistent human rights concern.

The multiple wars of the twentieth century brought questions of theodicy to the forefront. For the first time since the pre-Constantinian era, Christian pacifism became an alternative to war. The Holocaust forced many to realize that supersessionism, the belief that Christians had replaced the Jews as God's chosen people, can lead to hatred, ethnocentrism, and racism. Supersessionism was never an official doctrine or universally accepted, and supersessionist texts are increasingly challenged.

For theologians writing after 1945, theology became dependent on context. Liberation theology was combined with the social gospel, redefining social justice, and exposing institutionalized sin to aid Latin American poor, but its context limited its application in other environments. Different historical and socio-political situations produced black theology and feminist theology. Combining Christianity with questions of civil rights, aspects of the Black Power movement, and responses to black Muslims produced a black theology that spread to the United Kingdom and parts of Africa, confronting apartheid in South Africa. The feminist movement of the mid-twentieth century began with an anti-Christian ethos but soon developed an influential feminist theology dedicated to transforming churches and society. Feminist theology developed at the local level through movements such as the womanist theology of African-American women, the "mujerista" theology of Hispanic women, and Asian feminist theology.

In the mid to late 1990s, postcolonial theology emerged globally from multiple sources. It analyzes structures of power and ideology to recover what colonialism erased or suppressed in indigenous cultures.

Modern motivation toward missions has declined in some denominations. The missionary movement of the twenty-first century has become a multi-cultural, multi-faceted global network of NGOs, volunteer doctors, short-term student volunteers, and traditional long-term bilingual, bicultural professionals who focus on evangelism and local development.

== See also ==
- Historical background of the New Testament
- Historicity of the Bible
- Jesus in Christianity
- Life of Jesus
- Timeline of the Roman Catholic Church

Christian history ("c" is century)
B.C.	1st c.	2nd c.	3rd c.	4th c.	5th c.	6th c.	7th c.	8th c.	9th c.	10th c.
11th c.	12th c.	13th c.	14th c.	15th c.	16th c.	17th c.	18th c.	19th c.	20th c.	21st c.

== Sources ==
=== Books & periodicals ===
- Abrams, Lesley (2016). "The conversion of the Danelaw". Vikings and the Danelaw: Select Papers from the Proceedings of the Thirteenth Viking Congress, Nottingham and York, 21-30 August 1997 (Repr. ed.). Oxford: Oxbow. pp. 31–44. ISBN 978-1-78570-453-6. JSTOR j.ctt1kw29nj.7.
- Abulafia, Anna Sapir (2002). "Introduction". In Abulafia, Anna Sapir (ed.). Religious Violence Between Christians and Jews: Medieval Roots, Modern Perspectives. Palgrave. pp. xi–xviii. ISBN 978-1-349-42499-3.
- Adams, Gregory; Adams, Kristina (2012). "Circumcision in the Early Christian Church: The Controversy That Shaped a Continent". In Bolnick, David; Koyle, Martin; Yosha, Assaf (eds.). Surgical Guide to Circumcision. Berlin: Springer. pp. 290–298. doi:10.1007/978-1-4471-2858-8_26. ISBN 978-1-4471-2858-8.
- Aguilera-Barchet, Bruno (2015). "Popes vs. Emperors: The Rise and Fall of Papal Power". A History of Western Public Law. Springer. doi:10.1007/978-3-319-11803-1. ISBN 978-3-319-11802-4.
- Agosti, Gianfranco (2015). "Greek poetry". In Johnson, Scott Fitzgerald (ed.). The Oxford Handbook of Late Antiquity (Repr. ed.). Oxford University Press. pp. 361–404. ISBN 978-0-19-027753-6.
- Akanji, Israel (2010). "Black Theology". In Irele, Abiola (ed.). The Oxford Encyclopedia of African Thought. Vol. 1. Oxford University Press. ISBN 978-0-19-533473-9.
- Albert, Eleanor (2018). "Christianity in China". Council on Foreign Relations. Archived from the original on 7 July 2021.
- Allen Jr., John L. (2016). The Global War on Christians: Dispatches from the Front Lines of Anti-Christian Persecution. Crown Publishing Group. ISBN 978-0-7704-3737-4.
- Althoff, Gerd (2019). "Communicating Papal Primacy: the Impact of Gregory VII's Ideas (11th–13th Century)". Rules and Rituals in Medieval Power Games. Brill. pp. 189–202. doi:10.1163/9789004415317_015. ISBN 978-9-00441-531-7. S2CID 211661394.
- Ames, Christine Caldwell (2009). Righteous Persecution: Inquisition, Dominicans, and Christianity in the Middle Ages. University of Pennsylvania Press. ISBN 978-0-8122-4133-4.
- Anderson, Allan; Tang, Edmund (2005). Asian and Pentecostal: The Charismatic Face of Christianity in Asia. Oxford Centre for Mission Studies. ISBN 978-1-870345-43-9.
- Angold, Michael (2006). "Frontmatter". The Cambridge History of Christianity. Cambridge University Press. ISBN 978-1-139-05408-9.
- Arnold, John H. (2018). "Persecution and Power in Medieval Europe: The Formation of a Persecuting Society, by R. I. Moore". The American Historical Review (Book review). 123 (1). Oxford University Press.
- Asprey, Christopher (2008). Murphy, Francesca Aran (ed.). Ecumenism Today: The Universal Church in the 21st Century (1st ed.). Routledge. ISBN 978-0-7546-5961-7.
- Aston, Nigel (2006). "Continental Catholic Europe". In Brown, S.; Tackett, T. (eds.). The Cambridge History of Christianity. Vol. 7. Cambridge University Press. pp. 13–32. doi:10.1017/CHOL9780521816052.003. ISBN 978-1-139-05412-6.
- Athanasopoulos, Constantinos (2020). Orthodox Mysticism and Asceticism: Philosophy and Theology in St Gregory Palamas' Work. Cambridge Scholars Publishing. ISBN 978-1-5275-5880-9.
- Bachrach, Bernard S. (1977). Early medieval Jewish policy in Western Europe. Minneapolis: University of Minnesota Press. ISBN 978-0-8166-0814-0.
- Baird, William (1992). History of New Testament Research, Volume One: From Deism to Tübingen (Reprinted ed.). Fortress. ISBN 978-1-4514-2017-3.
- Barnett, S. J. (1999). "Where Was Your Church before Luther? Claims for the Antiquity of Protestantism Examined". Church History. 68 (1): 14–41. doi:10.2307/3170108. JSTOR 3170108. S2CID 154764488.
- Barnes, T. D. (1968). "Legislation against the Christians". The Journal of Roman Studies. 58: 32–50. doi:10.2307/299693. JSTOR 299693. S2CID 161858491.
- Barton, John (1998). Holy Writings, Sacred Text: The Canon in Early Christianity (Repr. ed.). Westminster John Knox. ISBN 978-0-664-25778-1.
- Bauer, Susan Wise (2013). The History of the Renaissance World: From the Rediscovery of Aristotle to the Conquest of Constantinople. W. W. Norton. ISBN 978-0-393-05976-2.
- Bayliss, Richard (2004). Provincial Cilicia and the Archaeology of Temple Conversion. Oxford: Archaeopress. ISBN 978-1-84171-634-3.
- Becker, Sascha O.; Pfaff, Steven; Rubin, Jared (2016). "Causes and Consequences of the Protestant Reformation". ESI Working Paper 16–13. ISSN 2572-1496. Archived from the original on 25 June 2023.
- Behringer, Wolfgang (2019). "Weather, hunger and fear: origins of the European witch-hunts in climate, society and mentality". In Oldridge, Darren (ed.). The Witchcraft Reader. Routledge. ISBN 978-0-415-21492-6.
- Bejczy, István (1997). "Tolerantia: A Medieval Concept". Journal of the History of Ideas. 58 (3): 365–384. doi:10.2307/3653905. hdl:2066/28338. JSTOR 3653905.
- Benedict, Philip (2002). Christ's Churches Purely Reformed: A Social History of Calvinism. New Haven: Yale University Press. ISBN 978-0-300-10507-0.
- Bernardini, Paolo; Fiering, Norman (2001). The Jews and the Expansion of Europe to the West, 1450 to 1800. Berghahn. ISBN 978-1-57181-430-2.
- Bermejo, Saúl Martínez; Byrappa, Ramachandra; Křížová, Markéta; Graf, Tobias P. (2023). "Europe's Other(ed)s: The Americas, Africa, Asia, and Middle East in Early Modern History (ca. 1500–1800)". The European Experience A Multi-perspective History of Modern Europe. Open Book Publishers. ISBN 978-1-80064-873-9.
- Berndt, Guido M.; Steinacher, Roland (2014). Arianism: Roman Heresy and Barbarian Creed (1st ed.). London: Routledge. ISBN 978-1-4094-4659-0.
- Beuys, Barbara (2020). "Mit Visionen zur Autorität". Damals (in German). No. 6.
- Bickerman, E. J. (1949). "The Name of Christians". Harvard Theological Review. 42 (2): 109–124. doi:10.1017/S0017816000019635.
- Blowers, Paul M. (2007). "Interpreting scripture". In Casiday, A.; Norris, F. W. (eds.). The Cambridge History of Christianity. Vol. 2. Cambridge University Press. ISBN 978-1-139-05413-3.
- Boatwright, Mary Taliaferro; Gargola, Daniel J.; Talbert, Richard John Alexander (2004). The Romans: From Village to Empire. Oxford: Oxford University Press. ISBN 978-0-19-511875-9.
- Bokenkotter, Thomas (2007). A Concise History of the Catholic Church (Rev. ed.). New York: Crown. ISBN 978-0-307-42348-1.
- Bonser, Wilfrid (1962). "The Cult of Relics in the Middle Ages". Folklore. 73 (4): 234–56. JSTOR 1258503.
- Boppart, Timo; Falkinger, Josef; Grossmann, Volker (1 April 2014). "Protestantism and Education: Reading (the Bible) and Other Skills" (PDF). Economic Inquiry. 52 (2): 874–895. doi:10.1111/ecin.12058. ISSN 1465-7295. S2CID 10220106. Archived (PDF) from the original on 7 March 2020.
- Father Arseny, 1893–1973: Priest, Prisoner, Spiritual Father: Being the Narratives Compiled by the Servant of God Alexander Concerning His Spiritual Father. Translated by Vera Bouteneff. St. Vladmir's Seminary Press. 1998. pp. vi–1. ISBN 978-0-88141-180-5.
- Bradbury, Scott (1995). "Julian's Pagan Revival and the Decline of Blood Sacrifice". Phoenix. 49 (4): 331–356. doi:10.2307/1088885. JSTOR 1088885.
- Bray, Gerald; Gardner, Paul (2001). "The Joint Declaration on the Doctrine of Justification". Churchman. 115 (2): 110–127.
- Bremmer, Jan N. (2020). "2: Priestesses, Pogroms and Persecutions: Religious Violence in Antiquity in a Diachronic Perspective". In Raschle, Christian R.; Dijkstra, Jitse H. F. (eds.). Religious Violence in the Ancient World From Classical Athens to Late Antiquity. Cambridge University Press. ISBN 978-1-108-84921-0.
- Brink, Stefan (2004). "New Perspectives on the Christianization of Scandinavia and the Organization of the Early Church". Scandinavia and Europe 800-1350: Contact, Conflict, and Coexistence. ISD. pp. 163–175. ISBN 978-2-503-51085-9.
- Brita, Antonella (2020). "Genres of Ethiopian-Eritrean Christian Literature with a Focus on Hagiography". In Kelly, Samantha (ed.). A Companion to Medieval Ethiopia and Eritrea. Brill. pp. 252–281. ISBN 978-90-04-41943-8.
- Broadhead, Edwin K. (2017). "Early Jewish Christianity". In Esler, Philip F. (ed.). The Early Christian World. Vol. 1 (second ed.). Routledge. ISBN 978-0-41-535092-1.
- Brodman, James (2009). Charity and Religion in Medieval Europe. Catholic University of America Press. ISBN 978-0-8132-1580-8.
- Brown, Alan (2007). "The intellectual debate between Christians and pagans". In Casiday, A.; Norris, F. W. (eds.). The Cambridge History of Christianity. Vol. 2. Cambridge University Press. pp. 248–278. ISBN 978-1-139-05413-3.
- Brown, Christopher (2006). "Christianity and the campaign against slavery and the slave trade". In Brown, Stewart; Tackett, Timothy (eds.). The Cambridge History of Christianity. Vol. 7. Cambridge University Press. pp. 517–535. doi:10.1017/CHOL9780521816052.028. ISBN 978-1-139-05412-6.
- Brown, P. (1964). "St. Augustine's Attitude to Religious Coercion". Journal of Roman Studies. 54 (1–2): 107–116. doi:10.2307/298656. JSTOR 298656. S2CID 162757247.
- Brown, Peter (1993). "The problem of Christianization". Proceedings of the British Academy. 82. Oxford University Press.
- Brown, Peter (2003). The Rise of Western Christendom: Triumph and Diversity, A.D. 200-1000 (2nd ed.). Malden: Blackwell Publishers. ISBN 978-0-631-22137-1.
- Brown, Peter (1976). "Eastern and western Christendom in late antiquity: a parting of the way". Studies in Church History. 13: 1–24. doi:10.1017/S0424208400006574.
- Brown, Peter (1997). "SO Debate: The World of Late Antiquity Revisited". Symbolae Osloenses. 72 (1): 5–30. doi:10.1080/00397679708590917. ISSN 1502-7805.
- Brown, Peter (1998). "Christianization and religious conflict". In Cameron, Averil; Garnsey, Peter (eds.). The Cambridge Ancient History XIII: The Late Empire, A.D. 337–425. The Cambridge Ancient History, second series. Cambridge University Press. ISBN 978-0-521-30200-5.
- Brown, Peter (2012). The rise of Western Christendom: triumph and diversity, A.D. 200–1000 (Third, revised ed.). Malden, MA: John Wiley & Sons. ISBN 978-1-118-33884-1.
- Brown, Peter (2008). "Introduction: Christendom, c. 600". In Noble, T.; Smith, J. (eds.). The Cambridge History of Christianity. Vol. 3. Cambridge University Press. pp. 1–18. doi:10.1017/CHOL9780521817752.002. ISBN 978-0-521-81775-2.
- Brown, Raymond E. (2010) [1997]. An Introduction to the New Testament. The Anchor Yale Bible Reference Library. Yale University Press. ISBN 978-0-300-14016-3.
- Bruce, F. F. (1988). The Canon of Scripture. Intervarsity Press. ISBN 978-0-8308-1258-5.
- Bull, Marcus (2009). "Crusade and conquest". In Rubin, Miri; Simons, Walter (eds.). The Cambridge History of Christianity. Vol. 4. Cambridge University Press. pp. 340–352. doi:10.1017/CHOL9780521811064. ISBN 978-1-139-05602-1.
- Bundy, David (2007). "Early Asian and East African Christianities". In Casiday, Augustine; Norris, Frederick W. (eds.). The Cambridge History of Christianity. Vol. 2. Cambridge University Press. pp. 118–148. doi:10.1017/CHOL9780521812443. ISBN 978-1-139-05413-3.
- Burgess, Stanley M. (2006). "Introduction". In Burgess, Stanley M. (ed.). Encyclopedia of Pentecostal and charismatic Christianity. Religion and Society. New York: Routledge. ISBN 978-0-415-96966-6.
- Bury, J.B. (1967). The invasion of Europe by the barbarians (reissue ed.). W. W. Norton. ISBN 978-0-393-00388-8.
- Butler, Cuthbert (1919). Benedictine Monachism: Studies in Benedictine Life and Rule. New York: Longmans, Green & Co. pp. 3–8.
- Byfield, Ted (2008). A Glorious Disaster: A.D. 1100 to 1300 : the Crusades: Blood, Valor, Iniquity, Reason, Faith. Christian History Project. ISBN 978-0-9689873-7-7.
- Cairns, Earle E. (2015). An Endless Line of Splendor: Revivals and Their Leaders from the Great Awakening to the Present. Wipf & Stock. ISBN 978-1-4982-2340-9.
- Calciu-Dumitreasa, George (May 1983). "Sermons to young people by Father George Calciu-Dumitreasa. Given at the Chapel of the Romanian Orthodox Church Seminary". Word Magazine. Antiochian Orthodox Christian Archdiocese of North America. pp. 5–8. Archived from the original on 2 March 2007 – via Orthodox Research Institute.
- Caldwell, Robert W. (2017). Theologies of the American Revivalists: From Whitefield to Finney. InterVarsity Press. ISBN 978-0-8308-9178-8.
- Cameron, Alan (2011). The Last Pagans of Rome. Oxford: Oxford University Press. ISBN 978-0-19-974727-6.
- Cameron, Averil (1993). The Later Roman Empire, AD 284-430 (illustrated ed.). Harvard University Press. ISBN 978-0-674-51194-1.
- Cameron, Averil (2006). "Constantine and the 'peace of the church'". In Mitchell, M.; Young, F. (eds.). The Cambridge History of Christianity. Vol. 1. Cambridge University Press. pp. 538–551. doi:10.1017/CHOL9780521812399.032. ISBN 978-1-139-05483-6.
- Cameron, Averil (2015). The Mediterranean world in late Antiquity: AD 395–700. Routledge. ISBN 978-1-136-67306-1.
- Campbell, Alex; Sherman, Randy; Magee, William P. (2010). "The role of humanitarian missions in modern surgical training". Plastic and Reconstructive Surgery. 126 (1): 295–302. doi:10.1097/PRS.0b013e3181dab618. PMID 20595875.
- Cantor, Norman F. (1960). "The Crisis of Western Monasticism, 1050–1130". The American Historical Review. 66 (1): 47–67. doi:10.2307/1845706. JSTOR 1845706.
- Carocci, Sandro (2016). "Popes as Princes? The Papal States (1000–1300)". In Larson, Atria; Sisson, Keith (eds.). A Companion to the Medieval Papacy: Growth of an Ideology and Institution. Brill. ISBN 978-90-04-31528-0.
- Carrington, Philip (2011). The Early Christian Church. Vol. 1, The First Christian Church (Repr. ed.). Cambridge University Press. ISBN 978-0-521-16641-6.
- Casiday, Augustine (2007). "Sin and salvation: Experiences and reflections". In Casiday, A.; Norris, F. W. (eds.). The Cambridge History of Christianity. Vol. 2. Cambridge University Press. pp. 501–530. ISBN 978-1-139-05413-3.
- Casiday, Augustine; Norris, Frederick W. (2007). "Introduction". In Casiday, Augustine; Norris, Frederick W. (eds.). The Cambridge History of Christianity. Vol. 2. Cambridge University Press. ISBN 978-1-139-05413-3.
- Caspari, Fritz (1947). "Erasmus on the social functions of Christian Humanism". Journal of the History of Ideas. 8 (1): 78–106. doi:10.2307/2707442. JSTOR 2707442.
- Casanova, José (1994). Public Religions in the Modern World. The University of Chicago Press. ISBN 978-0-226-09535-6.
- Cassidy, Edward Idris (2005). Ecumenism and Interreligious Dialogue: Unitatis Redintegratio, Nostra Aetate. Paulist Press. ISBN 978-0-8091-4338-2.
- Castelli, Elizabeth A. (2004). Martyrdom and Memory: Early Christian Culture Making. New York: Columbia University Press.
- Chadwick, Henry (1985). "The Ascetic Ideal in the History of the Church". Studies in Church History. 22: 1–23. doi:10.1017/S0424208400007841.
- Chaillot, Christine (2016). "The Dialogue between the Eastern Orthodox and Oriental Orthodox Churches". Volos. Volos Academy Publications.
- Chapman, Mark (2006). Anglicanism: A Very Short Introduction. Oxford University Press. ISBN 978-0-19-157819-9.
- Chinnici, Joseph P. (2012). "Ecumenism, Civil Rights, and the Second Vatican Council: The American Experience". U.S. Catholic Historian. 30 (3): 21–49. ISSN 0735-8318. JSTOR 23362900.
- Chopp, Rebecca S.; Regan, Ethna (2013). "Latin American Liberation Theology". In Ford, David F.; Muers, Rachel (eds.). The Modern Theologians: An Introduction to Christian Theology Since 1918 (3rd ed.). John Wiley and Sons. pp. 469–484. ISBN 978-1-118-83496-1.
- Christiansen, Eric (1997). The Northern Crusades. London: Penguin Books. ISBN 978-0-14-026653-5.
- Cleall, Esme; Křížová, Markéta; Kuipers, Matthijs (2023). "3.2.2 Empire and Colonialism in Modern History (ca. 1800–1900)". The European Experience A Multi-perspective History of Modern Europe. Open Book Publishers. ISBN 978-1-80064-873-9.
- Cloke, Gillian (1995). This Female Man of God: Women and Spiritual Power in the Patristic Age, 350–450 AD. London: Routledge. ISBN 978-0-415-09469-6.
- Coffey, John (December 1998). "Puritanism and Liberty Revisited: The Case for Toleration in the English Revolution". The Historical Journal. 41 (4): 961–985. doi:10.1017/S0018246X98008103. S2CID 159485109.
- Coffey, John (2014). Persecution and Toleration in Protestant England 1558–1689. Routledge. ISBN 978-1-317-88442-2.
- Cohen, Jeremy (1998). "'Slay Them Not': Augustine and the Jews in Modern Scholarship". Medieval Encounters. 4 (1). E. J. Brill: 78–92. doi:10.1163/157006798X00043.
- Collins, Roger (1998). Charlemagne. Toronto: University of Toronto Press. ISBN 978-0-8020-8218-3.
- Constable, Olivia Remie (2004). Housing the Stranger in the Mediterranean World: Lodging, Trade, and Travel in Late Antiquity and the Middle Ages. Cambridge University Press. ISBN 978-1-139-44968-7.
- Constable, Giles (1998). The Reformation of the Twelfth Century (Rev. ed.). Cambridge University Press. ISBN 978-0-521-63871-5.
- Cooper, Michael T. (2005). "Colonialism, neo-colonialism and forgotten missiological lessons". Global Missiology. 2 (2): 1–14.
- Costambeys, Marios (2000). "Property, ideology and the territorial power of the papacy in the early Middle Ages". Early Medieval Europe. 9 (3). doi:10.1111/1468-0254.00075.
- Cowe, S. (2006). "The Armenians in the era of the crusades 1050–1350". In Angold, Michael (ed.). The Cambridge History of Christianity Eastern Christianity. Vol. 5. Cambridge University Press. pp. 404–429. doi:10.1017/CHOL9780521811132.018. ISBN 978-1-139-05408-9.
- Crislip, Andrew Todd (2005). From Monastery to Hospital: Christian Monasticism & the Transformation of Health Care in Late Antiquity. University of Michigan Press. ISBN 978-0-472-11474-0.
- Croix, G. E. M. de Sainte (2006). Whitby, Michael (ed.). Christian Persecution, Martyrdom, and Orthodoxy. Oxford University Press. ISBN 978-0-19-927812-1.
- Croke, Brian (2015). "Historiography". In Johnson, Scott Fitzgerald (ed.). The Oxford Handbook of Late Antiquity (illustrated reprint ed.). Oxford University Press. pp. 405–436. ISBN 978-0-19-027753-6.
- Cross, Richard (2001). "A Recent Contribution on the Distinction between Monophysitism and Chalcedonianism". The Thomist: A Speculative Quarterly Review. 65 (3). Project MUSE: 361–383. doi:10.1353/tho.2001.0001.
- Cullmann, Oscar (2018). The Earliest Christian Confessions (reprint ed.). Wipf & Stock. ISBN 978-1-5326-5336-0.
- Cusick, James G. (2015). Studies in Culture Contact: Interaction, Culture Change, and Archaeology (illustrated, reprint ed.). SIU Press. ISBN 978-0-8093-3409-4.
- Dannenbaum, Jed (1981). "The Origins of Temperance Activism and Militancy among American Women". Journal of Social History. 15 (2): 235–52. doi:10.1353/jsh/15.2.235. JSTOR 3787109.
- Deane, Jennifer Kolpacoff (2022). A History of Medieval Heresy and Inquisition. Rowman & Littlefield. ISBN 978-1-5381-5295-9.
- Decret, Francois (2011). Early Christianity in North Africa. Lutterworth Press. ISBN 978-0-227-90308-7.
- de Juan, Alexander; Pierskalla, Jan Henryk (2017). "The Comparative Politics of Colonialism and Its Legacies: An Introduction". Politics & Society. 45 (2 Special Issue): 159–172. doi:10.1177/0032329217704434. S2CID 54971921.
- De Jonge, H. J. (2003). "The New Testament Canon". In Auwers, Jean-Marie; De Jonge, H. J. bibliques de (eds.). The Biblical Canons. Leuven University Press. pp. 309–319. ISBN 978-2-87723-651-5.
- Deininger, Matthias (2014). Global Pentecostalism: An Inquiry into the Cultural Dimensions of Globalization. Anchor. ISBN 978-3-95489-570-0.
- Den Heijer, Alexandra (2011). Managing the University Campus: Information to Support Real Estate Decisions. Academische Uitgeverij Eburon. ISBN 978-90-5972-487-7.
- Dilley, Andrea Palpant (2014). "The surprising discovery about those colonialist, proselytizing missionaries". Christianity Today. Vol. 58, no. 1. [rtf]pb.works.com.
- Dixon, C. Scott (2017). "Luther's Ninety-Five Theses and the Origins of the Reformation Narrative". The English Historical Review. 132 (556). Oxford University Press: 533–569. doi:10.1093/ehr/cex224.
- Dodds, E. R. (1970). Pagan and Christian in an Age of Anxiety: Some Aspects of Religious Experience from Marcus Aurelius to Constantine. New York: Norton. ISBN 978-0-393-00545-5.
- Dorfmann-Lazarev, Igor (2008). "Beyond empire I: Eastern Christianities from the Persian to the Turkish conquest, 604–1071". In Noble, T.; Smith, J. (eds.). The Cambridge History of Christianity. Vol. 3. Cambridge University Press. pp. 1–18. doi:10.1017/CHOL9780521817752.002. ISBN 978-0-521-81775-2.
- Dowley, Tim (2018). A Short Introduction to the History of Christianity. Fortress. ISBN 978-1-5064-4597-7.
- Drake, H.A., ed. (2006). Violence in Late Antiquity: Perceptions and Practices. Aldershot: Ashgate. ISBN 978-0-7546-5498-8.
- Drake, H. A. (2007). "The church, society and political power". In Casiday, Augustine; Norris, Frederick W. (eds.). The Cambridge History of Christianity. Vol. 21. Cambridge University Press. ISBN 978-1-139-05413-3.
- Drake, H. A. (2012). "The Impact of Constantine on Christianity". In Lenski, Noel Emmanuel (ed.). The Cambridge Companion to the Age of Constantine (illustrated, revised ed.). Cambridge University Press. ISBN 978-1-107-01340-7.
- Dunbabin, Jean (2003). "The Council of Bourges, 1225: a Documentary History". The English Historical Review. 118 (475): 178–179. doi:10.1093/ehr/118.475.178.
- Dunch, Ryan (2002). "Beyond Cultural Imperialism: Cultural Theory, Christian Missions, and Global Modernity". History and Theory. 41 (3): 301–325. doi:10.1111/1468-2303.00208. JSTOR 3590688.
- Dunn, James D.G. (1999). Jews and Christians: The Parting of the Ways, A.D. 70 to 135. Grand Rapids: Wm. B. Eerdmans Publishing. ISBN 978-0-8028-4498-9.
- Dunn, James D.G. (1994). "WHY "INCARNATION"? A Review of Recent New Testament Scholarship". In Porter, Stanley E.; Joyce, Paul; Orton, David E. (eds.). Crossing the Boundaries Essays in Biblical Interpretation in Honour of Michael D. Goulder. Brill. pp. 235–256. doi:10.1163/9789004493513_021. ISBN 978-90-04-10131-9.
- Dunn, Marilyn (2003). The Emergence of Monasticism: From the Desert Fathers to the Early Middle Ages. John Wiley & Sons. ISBN 978-1-4051-0641-2.
- Eichbauer, M. H. (2022). "The Shaping and Reshaping of the Relationship between Church and State from Late Antiquity to the Present: A Historical Perspective through the Lens of Canon Law". Religions. 13 (5): 378. doi:10.3390/rel13050378.
- Eichbauer, M.H. (2014). "Medieval Inquisitorial Procedure: Procedural Rights and the Question of Due Process in the 13th Century". History Compass. 12: 72–83.
- Eidintas, Alfonsas (2001). President of Lithuania: Prisoner of the Gulag: a Biography of Aleksandras Stulginskis. Genocide and Resistance Research Center of Lithuania. ISBN 978-9986-757-41-2.
- Eltis, David (1987). Economic Growth and the Ending of the Transatlantic Slave Trade. Oxford University Press. ISBN 978-0-19-536481-1.
- Eltis, David; Bradley, Keith R.; Cartledge, Paul; Drescher, Seymour; Engerman, Stanley L., eds. (2011). The Cambridge World History of Slavery: Volume 3, AD 1420-AD 1804. Cambridge University Press. ISBN 978-0-521-84068-2.
- Emery, Gilles; Levering, Matthew (2011). "Introduction". In Emery, Gilles; Levering, Matthew (eds.). The Oxford Handbook of the Trinity (illustrated, reprint ed.). Oxford University Press. ISBN 978-0-19-955781-3.
- Esler, Philip Francis (2017). "The Mediterranean Context of Early Christianity". The early Christian world. Vol. 1 (second ed.). Routledge. ISBN 978-1-138-20007-4.
- Estep, William R. (1986). "Attempts at Reform: Wycliffe and Huss". Renaissance and Reformation. Grand Rapids, MI: Wm. B. Eerdmans. pp. 58–77. ISBN 978-0-8028-0050-3.
- Fahlbusch, Erwin; Bromiley, Geoffrey William, eds. (2003). The Encyclopedia of Christianity. Vol. 3. Wm. B. Eerdmans. ISBN 978-90-04-12654-1.
- Fahy, T. (1963). "The Council of Jerusalem". Irish Theological Quarterly. 30 (3): 232–261. doi:10.1177/002114006303000303. S2CID 170396423.
- Ferguson, Everett (2002). "Factors leading to the Selection and Closure of the New Testament Canon". In McDonald, L. M.; Sanders, J. A. (eds.). The Canon Debate (reprint ed.). Hendrickson. ISBN 978-0-8010-4708-4.
- Ferzoco, George (2001). "The Changing face of Tradition: Monastic Education in the Middle Ages". In Ferzoco, George; Muessig, Carolyn (eds.). Medieval Monastic Education. Bloomsbury. ISBN 978-1-4411-4340-2.
- Firlej, Dominik (2021–2022). "Why did Polish Kings not go on Crusade in the Levant?" (PDF). The Cupola. 16: 120–135. Archived (PDF) from the original on 26 March 2023.
- Flannery, John M. (2013). The Mission of the Portuguese Augustinians to Persia and Beyond (1602–1747). Brill. ISBN 978-90-04-24382-8.
- Folda, Jaroslav (1995). "7". In Riley-Smith, Jonathan (ed.). The Oxford Illustrated History of the Crusades. Oxford University Press. ISBN 978-0-19-820435-0.
- Fonnesberg-Schmidt, Iben (2007). The popes and the Baltic crusades, 1147–1254. Brill. ISBN 978-90-04-15502-2.
- Fontaine, Darcie (2016). Decolonizing Christianity: Religion and the End of Empire in France and Algeria. Cambridge University Press. ISBN 978-1-107-11817-1.
- Ford, David F. (2013). "Introduction". In Ford, David F.; Muers, Rachel (eds.). The Modern Theologians: An Introduction to Christian Theology Since 1918 (3rd ed.). John Wiley and Sons. ISBN 978-1-118-83496-1.
- Fousek, Jan; Kaše, Vojtěch; Mertel, Adam; Výtvarová, Eva; Chalupa, Aleš (2018). "Spatial constraints on the diffusion of religious innovations: The case of early Christianity in the Roman Empire". PLOS ONE. 13 (12) e0208744. Bibcode:2018PLoSO..1308744F. doi:10.1371/journal.pone.0208744. PMC 6306252. PMID 30586375.
- Fox, Jonathan (2013). "Religious discrimination against religious minorities in Middle Eastern Muslim states". Civil Wars. 15 (4): 454–470. doi:10.1080/13698249.2013.853413. S2CID 144353518.
- Franck, Thomas M. (1997). "Is Personal Freedom a Western Value?". American Journal of International Law. 91 (4): 593–627. doi:10.2307/2998096. JSTOR 2998096. S2CID 144328175.
- Frassetto, Michael (2007). Heretic Lives: Medieval Heresy from Bogomil and the Cathars to Wyclif and Hus. London: Profile. pp. 7–198. ISBN 978-1-86197-744-1.
- Fredriksen, Paula (2027). "chapter 29 Christians in the Roman Empire in the First Three Centuries C E". In Potter, David S. (ed.). A Companion to the Roman Empire. ISBN 978-1119520962.
- Frend, W. H. C. (2020). The Donatist Church. Wipf & Stock. ISBN 978-1-5326-9755-5.
- Frend, W. H. C. (2006). "Persecutions: Genesis and Legacy". In Mitchell, Margaret M.; Young, Frances M. (eds.). The Cambridge History of Christianity, Volume I: Origins to Constantine. New York: Cambridge University Press. pp. 503–523. ISBN 978-0-521-81239-9.
- Frost, J. William (1978). "The Origins of the Quaker Crusade Against Slavery: A Review of Recent Literature". Quaker History. 67 (1). MUSE: 42–58. doi:10.1353/qkh.1978.0015.
- Gaddis, Michael (2005). There Is No Crime for Those Who Have Christ: Religious Violence in the Christian Roman Empire. Berkeley: University of California Press. ISBN 978-0-520-24104-6.
- Garcia, Cheryl Crozier (2004). "Reviewed work: The Fourth Estate: A History of Women in the Middle Ages, Shulamith Shahar, Chaya Galai". International Social Science Review. 79 (3/4): 179–80. JSTOR 41887204.
- Gardner, Jane F. (1991). Women in Roman Law & Society. Indianapolis: Indiana University Press. p. 67. ISBN 978-0-253-20635-0.
- Gardner, Leigh; Roy, Tirthankar (2020). Economic Colonialism: The New Empire Building of the 21st Century. Bristol University Press. ISBN 978-1-5292-0766-8.
- Garrett, William R. (1987). "Religion, Law, and the Human Condition". Sociological Analysis. 47. Oxford University Press: 1–34. doi:10.2307/3711649. JSTOR 3711649.
- Gasper, Louis (2020). The Fundamentalist Movement (Repr. ed.). Walter de Gruyter. ISBN 978-3-11-231758-7.
- Gerberding, R.; Moran Cruz, J. H. (2004). Medieval Worlds. New York: Houghton Mifflin. ISBN 978-0-395-56087-7.
- Gerdmar, Anders (2009). Roots of Theological Anti-Semitism German Biblical Interpretation and the Jews, from Herder and Semler to Kittel and Bultmann. Brill. ISBN 978-90-04-16851-0.
- Gilley, Sheridan (2006). The Cambridge History of Christianity. Vol. 8: World Christianities c. 1815 – c. 1914. Cambridge University Press. ISBN 978-0-521-81456-0.
- Given, James Buchanan (2001). Inquisition and Medieval Society: Power, Discipline, and Resistance in Languedoc (Illustrated ed.). Cornell University Press. ISBN 978-0-8014-8759-0.
- Gonzalez, Justo L. (2010). The Story of Christianity. Vol. 2: The Reformation to the Present Day. HarperCollins. ISBN 978-0-06-185589-4.
- Goodenough, Erwin R. (1962). "Catacomb Art". Journal of Biblical Literature. 81 (2): 113–142. doi:10.2307/3264749. JSTOR 3264749.
- Goodman, Martin (2007). "Identity and Authority in Ancient Judaism". Judaism in the Roman World: Collected Essays. Brill. ISBN 978-90-04-15309-7.
- Gordon, Bruce (2022). "Late Medieval Christianity". In Marshall, Peter (ed.). The Oxford History of the Reformation. Oxford University Press. ISBN 978-0-19-289526-4.
- Gorham, Charles T. (2013). The Medieval Inquisition. A Study in Religious Persecution. Edizioni Savine. ISBN 9788896365359.
- Grabar, André (2023). Christian Iconography. Princeton University Press. ISBN 978-0-691-25209-4.
- Green, Bernard (2010). Christianity in Ancient Rome: The First Three Centuries. London: A&C Black. ISBN 978-0-567-03250-8.
- Gritsch, Eric W. (2010). A History of Lutheranism (second ed.). Fortress Press. ISBN 978-0-8006-9712-9.
- Grzymała-Busse, Anna M. (2023). Sacred Foundations: The Religious and Medieval Roots of the European State (Illustrated ed.). Princeton University Press. ISBN 978-0-691-24513-3.
- Guthrie, Stan (2014). Missions in the Third Millenium: 21 Key Trends for the 21st Century (reprint, revised ed.). Wipf and Stock Publishers. ISBN 978-1-4982-0345-6.
- Guy, Laurie (2011). Introducing Early Christianity: A Topical Survey of Its Life, Beliefs Practices. Westmont: InterVarsity.
- Haberkern, Phillip N. (2016). Patron Saint and Prophet: Jan Hus in the Bohemian and German Reformations. Oxford University Press. ISBN 978-0-19-028074-1.
- Haight, Roger D. (2004). Christian Community in History. Vol. 1: Historical Ecclesiology. New York: Continuum. ISBN 978-0-8264-1630-8.
- Hall, John R.; Battani, Marshall; Neitz, Mary Jo (2004). Sociology On Culture. Taylor & Francis. ISBN 978-1-134-45237-8.
- Hamilton, Bernard (2003). The Christian world of the Middle Ages. Sutton. ISBN 978-0-7509-2405-4.
- Harder, B. (1980). "The Student Volunteer Movement for Foreign Missions and Its Contribution to 20th Century Missions". Missiology. 8 (2): 141–154. doi:10.1177/009182968000800202.
- Harnett, Benjamin (2017). "The Diffusion of the Codex". Classical Antiquity. 36 (2). University of California Press: 183–235. doi:10.1525/ca.2017.36.2.183. JSTOR 26362608.
- Harney, Lorcan (2017). "Christianising Pagan Worlds in Conversion-Era Ireland: Archaeological Evidence for the Origins of Irish Ecclesiastical Sites". Proceedings of the Royal Irish Academy: Archaeology, Culture, History, Literature. 117C: 103–130. doi:10.3318/priac.2017.117.07.
- Harper, Kyle (2015). "Marriage and Family". In Johnson, Scott Fitzgerald (ed.). The Oxford Handbook of Late Antiquity (Repr. ed.). Oxford University Press. pp. 667–714. ISBN 978-0-19-027753-6.
- Harris, Harriet A. (1998). Fundamentalism and Evangelicals (Repr. ed.). Clarendon. ISBN 978-0-19-826960-1.
- Harris, Stephen; Grigsby, Bryon L. (2010). Misconceptions About the Middle Ages. Routledge. ISBN 9781135986667.
- Haskins, Charles Homer (1971). Renaissance of the Twelfth Century (Rev. ed.). Harvard University Press. ISBN 978-0-674-76075-2.
- Hastings, Ed (2000). "Law". In Hastings, Adrian; Mason, Alistair; Pyper, Hugh S. (eds.). The Oxford Companion to Christian Thought. Oxford University Press. ISBN 978-0-19-860024-4.
- Heather, Peter (2007). The Fall of the Roman Empire: A New History of Rome and the Barbarians (Repr. ed.). Oxford University Press. ISBN 978-0-19-532541-6.
- Heimert, Alan (2006). Religion and the American Mind: From the Great Awakening to the Revolution (Repr. ed.). Wipf & Stock. ISBN 978-1-59752-614-2.
- Helvétius, Anne-Marie; Kaplan, Michel (2008). "Asceticism and its institutions". In Noble, Thomas F. X.; Smith, Julia M. H. (eds.). The Cambridge History of Christianity. Vol. 3. Cambridge University Press. ISBN 978-1-139-05422-5.
- Herrin, Judith (2021). The Formation of Christendom. Princeton University Press. ISBN 978-0-691-21921-9.
- Herrin, Judith (2009). "Book Burning as purification". In Rousseau, Philip; Papoutsakis, Emmanuel (eds.). Transformations of Late Antiquity: Essays for Peter Brown. Vol. 2 (Repr. ed.). Ashgate. ISBN 978-0-7546-6553-3.
- Heß, Cordelia (2013). "A Common Enemy: Late Medieval Anticlericalism Revisited". Zeitschrift für Religionswissenschaft. 21 (1): 77–96. doi:10.1515/zfr-2013-0003.
- Higham, Nicholas John; Ryan, Martin J. (2013). The Anglo-Saxon world. New Haven, CT: Yale University Press. ISBN 978-0-300-12534-4.
- Hilkert, Mary Catherine (1995). "Feminist theology: a review of literature". Theological Studies. 56 (2): 327–341. doi:10.1177/004056399505600206. S2CID 171166197.
- Hobson, Theo (2013). Reinventing Liberal Christianity. Eerdmans. ISBN 978-0-8028-6840-4.
- Holmes, J. Derek (1981). The Papacy in the Modern World, 1914–1978. Crossroad. ISBN 978-0-8245-0047-4.
- Hopkins, Keith (1998). "Christian Number and Its Implications". Journal of Early Christian Studies. 6 (2): 185–226. doi:10.1353/earl.1998.0035. S2CID 170769034.
- Howe, Daniel Walker (2015). "Emergent Mormonism in Context". In Givens, Terryl; Barlow, Philip L. (eds.). The Oxford Handbook of Mormonism (illustrated ed.). Oxford University Press. ISBN 978-0-19-977836-2.
- Howe, John (2016). Before the Gregorian Reform: The Latin Church at the Turn of the First Millennium. Cornell University Press. ISBN 978-1-5017-0370-6.
- Humfress, Caroline (2013). "5: Laws' Empire: Roman Universalism and Legal Practice". New Frontiers: Law and Society in the Roman World. Edinburgh University Press. ISBN 978-0-7486-6817-5.
- Humfress, Caroline (2015). "7 Patristic sources". In Johnston, David (ed.). The Cambridge Companion to Roman Law. Cambridge University Press. ISBN 978-0-521-89564-4.
- Hunter, Dard (1978) [1947]. Papermaking: The History and Technique of an Ancient Craft. New York: Dover. ISBN 978-0-486-23619-3.
- Hunyadi, Zsolt; Laszlovszky, József (2001). The Crusades and the Military Orders: Expanding the Frontiers of Medieval Latin Christianity. Budapest: Central European University Press. ISBN 978-963-9241-42-8.
- Inglebert, Hervé (2015). "Introduction". In Johnson, Scott Fitzgerald (ed.). The Oxford Handbook of Late Antiquity (Repr. ed.). Oxford University Press. ISBN 978-0-19-027753-6.
- Iricinschi, Eduard; Zellentin, Holger M. (2008). "Making selves and Marking others: identity and Late Antique Heresiologies". Heresy and identity in late antiquity. Mohr Siebeck. pp. 1–27. ISBN 978-3-16-149122-1.
- Isichei, Elizabeth (1995). A history of Christianity in Africa: From antiquity to the present. Wm. B. Eerdmans. ISBN 978-0-8028-0843-1.
- Ivanič, Peter (2016). "The origins of Christianity in the territory of Czech and Slovak republics within the contexts of written sources". European Journal of Science and Theology. 12 (6): 123–130.
- Jacob, Margaret (2006). "The Enlightenment critique of Christianity". In S. J. Brown; T. Tackett (eds.). The Cambridge History of Christianity. Vol. 7: Enlightenment, Reawakening and Revolution 1660–1815. Cambridge University Press. pp. 265–282. ISBN 978-0-521-81605-2.
- Jenkins, Philip (2011). "The Rise of the New Christianity". The Next Christendom: The Coming of Global Christianity. Oxford University Press. pp. 101–133. ISBN 978-0-19-976746-5.
- Jenkins, Philip (2008). The Lost History of Christianity: The Thousand-Year Golden Age of the Church in the Middle East, Africa, and Asia — and How It Died. HarperCollins. pp. 14–15.
- Jestice, Phyllis G. (1997). Wayward Monks and the Religious Revolution of the Eleventh Century. Brill. ISBN 978-90-04-10722-9.
- Johnson, T. M.; Zurlo, G. A. (2014). "Christian Martyrdom as a Pervasive Phenomenon". Global Society. 51 (6): 679–685. doi:10.1007/s12115-014-9840-8.
- Jones, Charles Edwin (1974). Perfectionist Persuasion: The Holiness Movement and American Methodism, 1867-1936. Scarecrow Press. ISBN 978-1-4616-7039-1.
- Jones, David Ceri; White, Eryn Mant (2012). The Elect Methodists: Calvinistic Methodism in England and Wales, 1735–1811. University of Wales Press. ISBN 978-0-7083-2502-5.
- Judge, E. A. (2010). Nobbs, Alanna (ed.). Jerusalem and Athens: Cultural Transformation in Late Antiquity. Tübingen: Mohr Siebeck. ISBN 978-3-16-150572-0.
- Kaldellis, Anthony (2012). Procopius of Caesarea: Tyranny, History, and Philosophy at the End of Antiquity. University of Pennsylvania Press. ISBN 978-0-8122-0241-0.
- Kamen, Henry (2014). The Spanish Inquisition: A Historical Revision (Unabridged ed.). Yale University Press. ISBN 978-0-300-18051-0.
- Kaplan, Benjamin J. (2009). Divided by Faith Religious Conflict and the Practice of Toleration in Early Modern Europe. Harvard University Press. p. 191. ISBN 978-0-674-03930-8.
- Kelly, Joseph Francis (2009). The Ecumenical Councils of the Catholic Church: A History. Liturgical Press. ISBN 978-0-8146-5376-0.
- Kenworthy, Scott M. (2008). "Beyond Schism: Restoring Eastern Orthodoxy to the History of Christianity". Reviews in Religion and Theology. 15 (2): 171–178. doi:10.1111/j.1467-9418.2007.00377_1.x.
- Kienzle, Beverly Mayne (2001). Cistercians, Heresy, and Crusade in Occitania, 1145–1229: Preaching in the Lord's Vineyard. Boydell. ISBN 978-1-903153-00-0.
- Kim, Hyun Jin (2013). The Huns, Rome and the Birth of Europe. Cambridge University Press. ISBN 978-1-107-06722-6.
- Kim, Lloyd (2006). Polemic in the Book of Hebrews: Anti-Judaism, Anti-Semitism, Supersessionism?. Wipf & Stock. ISBN 978-1-4982-7636-8.
- Kirby, David P. (2000). The earliest English kings (Rev. ed.). London: Routledge. ISBN 978-0-415-24211-0.
- Kitromilides, Paschalis (2006). "Orthodoxy and the West: Reformation to Enlightenment". In Angold, Michael (ed.). The Cambridge History of Christianity. Cambridge University Press. pp. 187–209. doi:10.1017/CHOL9780521811132.009. ISBN 978-1-139-05408-9.
- Klier, John Doyle; Lambroza, Shlomo (2004). Pogroms: Anti-Jewish Violence in Modern Russian History. Cambridge University Press. ISBN 978-0-521-52851-1.
- Klutz, Todd (2002) [2000]. "Part II: Christian Origins and Development – Paul and the Development of Gentile Christianity". In Esler, Philip F. (ed.). The Early Christian World. Routledge Worlds (1st ed.). New York and London: Routledge. ISBN 978-1-03-219934-4.
- Kolbaba, Tia M. (2008). "Latin and Greek Christians". In Noble, Thomas F. X.; Smith, Julia M. H. (eds.). The Cambridge History of Christianity. Vol. 3. Cambridge University Press. pp. 213–229. ISBN 978-1-139-05422-5.
- Koschorke, Klaus (2025). Kim, Kirsteen; Bevans, Stephen B.; Ruokanen, Miikka (eds.). A Short History of Christianity beyond the West Asia, Africa, and Latin America, 1450–2000. Vol. 31. Brill. doi:10.1163/9789004699830. ISBN 978-90-04-69983-0.
- Köstenberger, Andreas J.; Kellum, Leonard Scott; Quarles, Charles Leland (2009). The Cradle, the Cross, and the Crown: An Introduction to the New Testament. B&H. ISBN 978-0-8054-4365-3.
- Kostick, Conor (2010). "Introduction". In Kostick, Conor (ed.). The Crusades and the Near East: Cultural Histories. Routledge. ISBN 978-1-136-90247-5.
- Kraemer, Ross S. (1980). "The Conversion of Women to Ascetic Forms of Christianity". Signs. 6 (2): 298–307. doi:10.1086/493798. JSTOR 3173928. S2CID 143202380.
- Kwiatkowska, Theresa (2010). "The Light Was Retreating Before Darkness: tales of the Witchhunt and Climate change". Medievalia (42). Mexico City: Ciudad Universitaria: 30–37. Archived from the original on 12 July 2023.
- Lacopo, Frank P. (2016). "Medieval Europe and the Culture of Contempt in the Age of the Lateran Councils". Grand Valley Journal of History. 4 (2).
- Law, David R. (2012). The Historical-Critical Method: A Guide for the Perplexed. T&T Clark. ISBN 978-0-567-40012-3.
- LaFosse, Mona Tokarek (2017). "Women, Children and house churches". In Esler, Philip F. (ed.). The Early Christian World. Vol. II (second ed.). Routledge. ISBN 978-1-03-219935-1.
- Larson, Atria (2016). "Introduction". In Larson, Atria; Sisson, Keith (eds.). A Companion to the Medieval Papacy: Growth of an Ideology and Institution. Brill. ISBN 978-90-04-31528-0.
- Lavan, Luke; Mulryan, Michael, eds. (2011). The Archaeology of Late Antique 'Paganism'. Leiden: Brill. ISBN 978-90-04-19237-9.
- Law, Stephen (2011). "Evidence, Miracles, and the Existence of Jesus". Faith and Philosophy. 28 (2): 129. doi:10.5840/faithphil20112821. Archived from the original on 29 July 2021.
- Lazzarini, Isabella; Blanning, T. C. W., eds. (2021). The Later Middle Ages. Oxford University Press. ISBN 978-0-19-873164-1.
- Leaver, R.A. (1989). "The Lutheran Reformation". In Fenlon, I. (ed.). The Renaissance. Man & Music. Palgrave Macmillan. pp. 263–285. doi:10.1007/978-1-349-20536-3_10. ISBN 978-0-333-52652-1.
- Léglu, Catherine; Rist, Rebecca; Taylor, Claire, eds. (2013). "Historical introduction". The Cathars and the Albigensian Crusade A Sourcebook (first ed.). Routledge. doi:10.4324/9781315798141. ISBN 978-0-415-73688-6.
- Leithart, Peter J. (2010). Defending Constantine: The Twilight of an Empire and the Dawn of Christendom. InterVarsity Press. ISBN 9780830827220.
- Levack, Brian P. (2013). "Introduction". In Levack, Brian P. (ed.). The Oxford Handbook of Witchcraft in Early Modern Europe and Colonial America. Oxford University Press. pp. 1–10. ISBN 978-0-19-957816-0.
- Levine, Amy-Jill (2022). "Supersessionism: Admit and Address Rather than Debate or Deny". Religions. 13 (155): 155. doi:10.3390/rel13020155.
- Lieu, Judith M. (1999). "The 'attraction of women' in/to early Judaism and Christianity: gender and the politics of conversion". Journal for the Study of the New Testament. 21 (72): 5–22. doi:10.1177/0142064X9902107202. S2CID 144475695.
- Lindberg, David C.; Numbers, Ronald L. (1986). "Introduction". In Lindberg, David C.; Numbers, Ronald L. (eds.). God & Nature: Historical Essays on the Encounter Between Christianity and Science. Berkeley: University of California Press. ISBN 978-0-520-05538-4.
- Logan, F. Donald (2013). A History of the Church in the Middle Ages (illustrated ed.). Routledge. ISBN 978-0-415-66994-8.
- Löhr, Winrich (2007). "Western Christianities". In Casiday, Augustine; Norris, Frederick W. (eds.). The Cambridge History of Christianity. Vol. 2. Cambridge University. pp. 7–51. ISBN 978-1-139-05413-3.
- Longwell, Horace Craig (1928). "The Significance of Scholasticism". The Philosophical Review. 37 (3): 210–225. doi:10.2307/2179428. JSTOR 2179428.
- Louth, Andrew (2008). "The emergence of Byzantine Orthodoxy, 600–1095". In Noble, Thomas F. X.; Smith, Julia M. H. (eds.). The Cambridge History of Christianity. Vol. Early Medieval Christianities, c.600 – c.1100. ISBN 978-1-139-05422-5.
- Lyman, J. Rebecca (2007). "Heresiology: The invention of 'heresy' and 'schism'". In Casiday, A.; Norris, F. W. (eds.). The Cambridge History of Christianity. Vol. 2. Cambridge University Press. ISBN 978-1-139-05413-3.
- MacCulloch, Diarmaid (2004). The Reformation: A History. Viking. ISBN 978-0-670-03296-9.
- MacCulloch, Diarmaid (2009). A History of Christianity: The First Three Thousand Years. London: Allen Lane. ISBN 978-0-7139-9869-6.
- MacDonald, Margaret Y. (1996). Early Christian Women and Pagan Opinion The power of the hysterical woman. Cambridge University Press. ISBN 978-0-521-56174-7.
- MacDonald, Margaret Y. (2003). "Was Celsus Right? The Role of Women in the Expansion of Early Christianity". In David L. Balch; Carolyn Osiek (eds.). Early Christian Families in Context: An Interdisciplinary Dialogue. Grand Rapids: Wm. B. Eerdmans. pp. 157–184. ISBN 978-0-8028-3986-2.
- Macdonald, Stuart (2015). "The Changed (and Changing) Face of Church History". Toronto Journal of Theology. 31 (1): 29–42. doi:10.3138/tjt.30.suppl_1.29.
- Mayer, Wendy (2020). "Religious Violence in Late Antiquity: Current approaches, trends and issues". In Dijkstra, Jitse H. F.; Raschle, Christian R. (eds.). Religious Violence in the Ancient World: From Classical Athens to Late Antiquity. Cambridge University Press. pp. 251–265. ISBN 978-1-108-49490-8.
- McGowan, Andrew B. (2016). "Book review The Original Bishops: Office and Order in the First Christian Communities". Ecclesiology. 12 (3): 370–372. doi:10.1163/17455316-01203010.
- MacMullen, Ramsay (1997). Christianity and Paganism in the Fourth to Eighth Centuries. Yale University Press. ISBN 978-0-300-08077-3.
- Malcolm, Matthew R. (2013). Paul and the Rhetoric of Reversal in 1 Corinthians: The Impact of Paul's Gospel on His Macro-Rhetoric. Cambridge: Cambridge University Press. ISBN 978-1-107-03209-5.
- Manji, Firoze; O'Coill, Carl (2002). "The missionary position: NGOs and development in Africa". International Affairs. 78 (3): 567–584. doi:10.1111/1468-2346.00267.
- Marcocci, Giuseppe (2013). Paiva, José Pedro (ed.). "From start to finish: the history of the Portuguese Inquisition revisited". História da Inquisição Portuguesa (1536–1821). 20. Lisboa: Esfera dos Livros. Archived from the original on 7 July 2020.
- Marcus, Joel (2006). "Jewish Christianity". In Mitchell, Margaret M.; Young, Francis M. (eds.). The Cambridge History of Christianity. Vol. 1. Cambridge University Press. pp. 85–102. ISBN 978-1-139-05483-6.
- Markus, Robert Austin (1990). The End of Ancient Christianity (illustrated, reprint ed.). Cambridge: Cambridge University Press. ISBN 978-0-521-33949-0.
- Marty, Martin (2006). "The American Revolution and religion, 1765–1815". In Brown, Stewart; Tackett, Timothy (eds.). The Cambridge History of Christianity. Vol. 7. Cambridge University Press. pp. 495–516. doi:10.1017/CHOL9780521816052.027. ISBN 978-1-139-05412-6.
- Marvin, Laurence W. (2008). The Occitan War: A Military and Political History of the Albigensian Crusade, 1209–1218. Cambridge University Press. ISBN 978-1-139-47014-8.
- Mathisen, Ralph W. (2002). "The Christianization of the Late Roman Senatorial Order: Circumstances and Scholarship". International Journal of the Classical Tradition. 9issue=Fall 2 (2): 257–278. doi:10.1007/BF02898437. JSTOR 30224309.
- Matthews, Roy T.; Platt, F. DeWitt (1998). The Western Humanities. Mayfield. ISBN 978-0-87484-785-7.
- Matter, Ann E. (2008). "Orthodoxy and deviance". In Noble, T.; Smith, J. (eds.). The Cambridge History of Christianity. Vol. 3. Cambridge University Press. pp. 510–530. doi:10.1017/CHOL9780521817752.002. ISBN 978-0-521-81775-2.
- Mayer, T. F. (2014). The Roman Inquisition on the Stage of Italy, c. 1590–1640. Philadelphia: University of Pennsylvania Press. ISBN 978-0-8122-4573-8.
- McBirnie, William Steuart (2013). The Search for the Twelve Apostles (revised ed.). Tyndale House Publishers, Inc. ISBN 978-1-4143-8535-8.
- McGill, Scott (2015). "Latin poetry". In Johnson, Scott Fitzgerald (ed.). The Oxford Handbook of Late Antiquity (Repr. ed.). Oxford University Press. pp. 335–360. ISBN 978-0-19-027753-6.
- McGinn, Sheila E. (2017). "Internal Renewal and Dissent in the Early Christian World". In Esler, Philip F. (ed.). The Early Christian World. Vol. II (second ed.). Routledge. ISBN 978-1-03-219935-1.
- McLean, Iain (2004). "Thomas Jefferson, John Adams, and the Déclaration des Droits de L'Homme et du Citoyen". In Ramazani, R. K.; Stettinius, Edward R. (eds.). The Future of Liberal Democracy. Springer Nature. pp. 13–30. ISBN 978-1-4039-6564-6.
- McLeod, Hugh (2006). "Introduction". In McLeod, Hugh (ed.). The Cambridge History of Christianity. Vol. 9: World Christianities c.1914-c.2000. Cambridge University Press. pp. 1–14. doi:10.1017/CHOL9780521815000.002. ISBN 978-1-139-05485-0.
- McManners, John (1990). The Oxford History of Christianity. Oxford University Press. ISBN 0-19-285291-4.
- Meeks, Wayne A. (2003). The First Urban Christians (2nd ed.). Yale University. ISBN 978-0-300-09861-7.
- Meyendorff, John (1979). Byzantine Theology: Historical Trends and Doctrinal Themes (Rev. ed.). Fordham University Press. ISBN 978-0-8232-0967-5.
- Mews, Constant J.; Welch, Anna (2016). Poverty and Devotion in Mendicant Cultures 1200–1450. Routledge. ISBN 978-1-4724-3732-7.
- Micheau, Françoise (2006). "Eastern Christianities (eleventh to fourteenth century): Copts, Melkites, Nestorians and Jacobites". In Angold, Michael (ed.). The Cambridge History of Christianity. Vol. 5: Eastern Christianity. Cambridge University Press. ISBN 978-1-139-05408-9.
- Milis, Ludovicus (1992). Angelic Monks and Earthly Men: Monasticism and Its Meaning to Medieval Society (illustrated, reprint, revised ed.). Boydell & Brewer Ltd. ISBN 978-0-85115-737-5.
- Milnor, Kristina (2011). "Women in Roman Society". In Peachin, Michael (ed.). The Oxford Handbook of Social Relations in the Roman World. doi:10.1093/oxfordhb/9780195188004.013.0029. ISBN 978-0-19-518800-4.
- Moore, R. I. (2007). The Formation of a Persecuting Society (2nd ed.). Malden, MA: Blackwell. ISBN 978-1-4051-2964-0.
- Mitchell, MM; Young, FM (2006). "Conclusion: retrospect and prospect". The Cambridge History of Christianity. Cambridge University Press. ISBN 978-1-139-05483-6.
- Moss, Candida R. (2012). Ancient Christian Martyrdom: Diverse Practices, Theologies, and Traditions. New Haven: Yale University Press. ISBN 978-0-300-15465-8.
- Mout, Nicolette (2007). "Peace without concord: Religious toleration in theory and practice". In Hsia, R. (ed.). The Cambridge History of Christianity. Vol. 6. Cambridge University Press. pp. 225–243. doi:10.1017/CHOL9780521811620.014. ISBN 978-1-139-05484-3.
- Muers, Rachel (2013). "Feminism, Gender, and Theology". In Ford, David F.; Muers, Rachel (eds.). The Modern Theologians: An Introduction to Christian Theology Since 1918 (3rd ed.). John Wiley and Sons. pp. 431–450. ISBN 978-1-118-83496-1.
- Mundy, John H. (2000). Europe in the High Middle Ages 1150–1300 (3rd ed.). Routledge. ISBN 978-0-582-36987-0.
- Murphy, James Bernard (2014). "Religious Violence: Myth or Reality? A Symposium on William T. Cavanaugh's The Myth of Religious Violence". Political Theology. 15 (6): 479–485. doi:10.1179/1462317X14Z.00000000093. S2CID 147458599.
- Nelson, Janet L. (2008). "Law and its applications". In Noble, T.; Smith, J. (eds.). The Cambridge History of Christianity. Vol. 3. Cambridge University Press. pp. 299–326. doi:10.1017/CHOL9780521817752.002. ISBN 978-0-521-81775-2.
- Nenonen, Marko (2012). "Who Bears the Guilt for the Persecution of Witches?". Studia Neophilologica. 84(sup1): 70–87. doi:10.1080/00393274.2012.668072.
- Nirenberg, David (2015). Communities of Violence: Persecution of Minorities in the Middle Ages (revised ed.). Princeton University Press. ISBN 978-0-691-16576-9.
- Nolan, Ann Michele (2006). A Privileged Moment: Dialogue in the Language of the Second Vatican Council, 1962-1965. Peter Lang. ISBN 978-3-03910-984-5.
- Noll, Mark A. (1997). Turning Points: Decisive Moments in the History of Christianity. Baker. ISBN 978-0-8010-5778-6.
- Northmore-Ball, Ksenia; Evans, Geoffrey (2016). "Secularization versus religious revival in Eastern Europe: Church institutional resilience, state repression and divergent paths". Social Science Research. 57: 31–48. doi:10.1016/j.ssresearch.2015.11.001. PMID 26973030.
- Norton, David (2011). The King James Bible: A Short History from Tyndale to Today (illustrated, reprint ed.). Cambridge University Press. ISBN 978-0-521-85149-7.
- Nurser, John (2003). "The "Ecumenical Movement", Churches, "Global Order", and Human Rights: 1938-1948". Human Rights Quarterly. 25 (4): 841–881. doi:10.1353/hrq.2003.0049.
- Olson, Roger E. (1999). The Story of Christian Theology: Twenty Centuries of Tradition and Reform. Downer's Grove, IN: InterVarsity. p. 172. ISBN 978-0-8308-1505-0.
- Olson, Roger E.; Hall, Christopher (2002). The Trinity. Wm. B. Eerdmans Publishing. ISBN 978-1-4674-3113-2.
- O'Malley, John W. (1995). The First Jesuits. Harvard University Press. ISBN 978-0-674-25194-6.
- Onnekink, David (2016). War and Religion after Westphalia, 1648–1713 (Repr. ed.). Routledge. ISBN 978-1-317-00052-5.
- Opoensky, Milan (2004). "Theology between Yesterday and Tomorrow". Occasional Papers on Religion in Eastern Europe. 24 (1) 2.
- Orr, James Edwin (2000). The Outpouring of the Spirit in Revival and Awakening and Its Issue in Church Growth (PDF). churchmodel.org.
- Packer, J. I. (1966). "Calvin the Theologian". In Duffield, G. E. (ed.). John Calvin: A Collection of Essays. Eerdmans.
- Patterson, Annabel (1997). Early modern liberalism (Illustrated ed.). Cambridge University Press. ISBN 978-0-521-59260-4.
- Pennington, Kenneth (2011). "Feudal Oath of Fidelity and Homage". In Pennington, Kenneth; Eichbauer, Melodie Harris (eds.). Law as Profession and Practice in Medieval Europe. Routledge. doi:10.4324/9781315591551-11 (inactive 22 December 2025). ISBN 978-1-315-59155-1.
- Pennington, K. (2007). "The growth of church law". In Casiday, Augustine; Norris, Frederick W (eds.). The Cambridge History of Christianity. Vol. 2. Cambridge University Press. pp. 386–402. ISBN 978-1-107-42363-3.
- Peters, Edward, ed. (1980). Heresy and Authority in Medieval Europe. Pittsburgh: University of Pennsylvania Press. ISBN 978-0-8122-1103-0.
- Phipps, W. E. (1988). "The origin of hospices/hospitals". Death Studies. 12 (2): 91–99. doi:10.1080/07481188808252226. PMID 10302347.
- Pintarić, Damir (16 November 2014). "Ecumenism – yes and/or no?". Kairos: Evangelical Journal of Theology. 8 (2): 175–186. ISSN 1846-4599. Archived from the original on 6 August 2023.
- Pipes, Richard (1995). Russia Under the Bolshevik Regime. Knopf Doubleday. ISBN 978-0-679-76184-6.
- Pomeroy, Sarah (1995). "Women in the Bronze Age and Homeric Epic". Goddesses, Whores, Wives, and Slaves: Women in Classical Antiquity. New York: Schocken. ISBN 978-0-8052-1030-9.
- Poppe, Andrzej (1991). "Christianity and Ideological change in Kievan Rus': The First Hundred Years". Canadian-American Slavic Studies. 25 (1–4): 3–26. doi:10.1163/221023991X00038.
- Porter, Stanley E. (2011). "Early Apocryphal Non-Gospel Literature and the New Testament Text" (PDF). Journal of Greco-Roman Christianity and Judaism. 8: 192–198. Archived (PDF) from the original on 9 October 2022.
- Power, Daniel (2006). The Central Middle Ages: Europe 950-1320 (illustrated, reprint ed.). Oxfrod University Press. ISBN 9780199253111.
- Praet, Danny (1992–1993). "Explaining the Christianization of the Roman Empire. Older theories and recent developments". Sacris Erudiri. Jaarboek voor Godsdienstgeschiedenis. A Journal on the Inheritance of Early and Medieval Christianity. 23: 5–119.
- Prideaux, Brian (1986). "Anglicans and Lutherans: the wider ecumenical context". Consensus. 12 (1).
- Radić, Radmilla (2010). "11:Serbian Christianity". In Parry, Ken (ed.). The Blackwell Companion to Eastern Christianity. Wiley. ISBN 978-1-4443-3361-9.
- Rahner, Hugo (2013). Church and State in Early Christianity. Ignatius. ISBN 978-1-68149-099-1.
- Rankin, David (2017). "Arianism". In Esler, Philip F. (ed.). The Early Christian World. Vol. II (second ed.). Routledge. ISBN 978-1-03-219935-1.
- Rapp, Stephen H. Jr. (2007). "Chapter 7 – Georgian Christianity". In Parry, Ken (ed.). The Blackwell Companion to Eastern Christianity. John Wiley & Sons. ISBN 978-1-4443-3361-9.
- Rawlings, Helen (2006). The Spanish Inquisition. Malden, MA: Blackwell. ISBN 978-0-631-20599-9.
- Reed, Richard Clark (1905). History of the Presbyterian churches of the world: adapted for use in the classroom. Westminster Press.
- Resnick, Irven M. (2012). Marks of Distinctions: Christian Perceptions of Jews in the High Middle Ages. The Catholic University of America Press. ISBN 978-0-8132-1969-1.
- Riggs, David. "Christianizing the Rural Communities of Late Roman Africa: A Process of Coercion or Persuasion?". In Drake (2006), pp. 297–308.
- Rist, Rebecca (2016). Popes and Zews, 1095-1291. Oxford University Press. ISBN 978-0-1987-1798-0.
- Rives, J. B. (1999). "The Decree of Decius and the Religion of Empire". The Journal of Roman Studies. 89: 135–154. doi:10.2307/300738. JSTOR 300738. S2CID 159942854.
- Robert, Dana L. (2009). Christian Mission: How Christianity Became a World Religion (Illustrated ed.). John Wiley & Sons. ISBN 978-0-631-23619-1.
- Robinson, W. Stitt (May 1952). "Indian Education and Missions in Colonial Virginia". The Journal of Southern History. 18 (2): 152–168. doi:10.2307/2954270. JSTOR 2954270.
- Rose, E. M. (2015). The Murder of William of Norwich: The Origins of the Blood Libel in Medieval Europe. Oxford University Press. ISBN 978-0-19-021962-8.
- Rosenthal, Judah M. (1956). "The Talmud on Trial: The Disputation at Paris in the Year 1240". The Jewish Quarterly Review. 47 (1): 58–76. doi:10.2307/1453186. JSTOR 1453186.
- Rosenwein, Barbara H. (2014). A Short History of the Middle Ages. Vol. 1 (Fourth ed.). University of Toronto Press. ISBN 978-1-4426-0611-1.
- Rossino, Alexander B. (2003). Hitler Strikes Poland: Blitzkrieg, Ideology, and Atrocity (Rev. ed.). University Press of Kansas. ISBN 978-0-7006-1392-2.
- Rothman, A. (2020). "The Jesuits and Slavery". Journal of Jesuit Studies. 8 (1): 1–10. doi:10.1163/22141332-0801P001.
- Rousseau, Philip (2017). "Inheriting the fifth century: Who bequeathed what?". In Allen, Pauline; Jeffreys, Elizabeth (eds.). The Sixth Century: End or Beginning?. Brill. ISBN 978-1-86420-074-4.
- Rubin, Miri; Simons, Walter (2009). "Introduction". In Rubin, Miri; Simons, Walter (eds.). The Cambridge History of Christianity. Cambridge University Press. ISBN 978-1-139-05602-1.
- Rummel, Eric O. (2006). "The Albigensian Crusade: A Historiographical Essay" (PDF)". Perspectives on History. XXI: 45–57.
- Runciman, W. G. (2004). "The Diffusion of Christianity in the Third Century AD as a Case-Study in the Theory of Cultural Selection". European Journal of Sociology. 45 (1): 3–21. doi:10.1017/S0003975604001365. S2CID 146353096.
- Sabo, Theodore (2018). From Monophysitism to Nestorianism: AD 431–681. Cambridge Scholars Publishing. ISBN 978-1-5275-0959-7.
- Sághy, Marianne; Schoolman, Edward M. (2017). Pagans and Christians in the Late Roman Empire: New Evidence, New Approaches (4th–8th centuries). Central European University Press. ISBN 978-963-386-256-8.
- Salzman, Michele Renee. "Rethinking Pagan-Christian Violence". In Drake (2006), pp. 265–286.
- Salzman, Michele Renee (1993). "The Evidence for the Conversion of the Roman Empire to Christianity in Book 16 of the 'Theodosian Code". Historia: Zeitschrift für Alte Geschichte. 42 (3). Franz Steiner Verlag: 362–378. JSTOR 4436297.
- Salzman, Michelle Renee (2021). The Falls of Rome: Crises, Resilience, and Resurgence in Late Antiquity. Cambridge University Press. ISBN 978-1-107-11142-4.
- Samson, Jane (2021). "The Problem of Colonialism in the Western Historiography of Christian Missions". Critical Readings in the History of Christian Mission. 2. Brill: 511–530. doi:10.1163/9789004399594_008. ISBN 978-90-04-39959-4.
- Sanmark, Alexandra (2004). Power and Conversion. A Comparative Study of Christianization in Scandinavia. The University of Uppsala. ISBN 978-91-506-1739-9.
- Sanneh, Lamin O. (2007). Disciples of all nations: Pillars of world Christianity. Oxford University Press. ISBN 978-0-19-804084-2.
- Sanneh, Lamin O. (2016). "Bible Translation, Culture, and Religion". In Sanneh, Lamin; McClymond, Michael (eds.). The Wiley Blackwell Companion to World Christianity. John Wiley & Sons. pp. 263–281. ISBN 978-1-118-55604-7.
- Saunders, Robert (2019). "A Great and Holy War: Religious Routes to Women's Suffrage, 1909–1914". The English Historical Review. 134 (571): 1471–1502. doi:10.1093/ehr/cez360.
- Schacter, Jacob J. (2011). Carlebach, Elisheva; Schacter, Jacob J. (eds.). New Perspectives on Jewish-Christian Relations: In Honor of David Berger. Netherlands: Brill. ISBN 978-9-00422-118-5.
- Schäferdiek, Knut (2007). "Germanic and Celtic Christianities". In Casiday, Augustine; Norris, Frederick W. (eds.). The Cambridge History of Christianity. Cambridge University Press. pp. 52–69. doi:10.1017/CHOL9780521812443. ISBN 978-1-139-05413-3.
- Schaff, Philip (2011). History of the Christian Church. Vol. IV: Mediaeval Christianity. A.D. 590–1073. CCEL. pp. 161–162. ISBN 978-1-936392-06-3.
- Schaltegger, Christoph A.; Torgler, Benno (1 May 2010). "Work ethic, Protestantism, and human capital" (PDF). Economics Letters. 107 (2): 99–101. doi:10.1016/j.econlet.2009.12.037. Archived (PDF) from the original on 22 May 2023.
- Schiffrin, Anya (2014). Global Muckraking: 100 Years of Investigative Journalism from Around the World (illustrated ed.). The New Press. ISBN 978-1-59558-973-6.
- Schwartz, Seth (9 February 2009). Imperialism and Jewish Society: 200 B.C.E. to 640 C.E. Princeton University Press. ISBN 978-1-4008-2485-4.
- Seagrave, S. Adam (2009). "Cicero, Aquinas, and Contemporary Issues in Natural Law Theory". The Review of Metaphysics. 62 (3): 491–523. JSTOR 40387823.
- Shatzmiller, Joseph (1974). "Review of 'Medieval Jewry in Northern France: A Political and Social History', by Robert Chazan". Jewish Social Studies (Book review). 36 (3): 339.
- Segovia, Fernando F.; Moore, Stephen D. (2007). "Introduction". In Segovia, Fernando F.; Moore, Stephen D. (eds.). Postcolonial Biblical Criticism: Interdisciplinary Intersections (Rev. ed.). A&C Black. ISBN 978-0-567-04530-0.
- Shaw, Teresa M. (2017). "Sex and Sexual Renunciation I". In Esler, Philip F. (ed.). The Early Christian World. Vol. 1 (second ed.). Routledge. ISBN 978-1-03-219935-1.
- Shelton, W. Brian (2018). Quest for the Historical Apostles: Tracing Their Lives and Legacies. Baker Publishing Group. ISBN 978-1-4934-1319-5.
- Shepard, J. (2006). "The Byzantine Commonwealth 1000–1550". In Angold, Michael (ed.). The Cambridge History of Christianity. Vol. 5: Eastern Christianity. Cambridge University Press. pp. 1–52. doi:10.1017/CHOL9780521811132.002. ISBN 978-1-139-05408-9.
- Shlikhta, Natalia (September 2004). "'Greek Catholic'–'Orthodox'–'Soviet': a symbiosis or a conflict of identitites?" (PDF). Religion, State and Society. 32 (3): 261–273. doi:10.1080/0963749042000252214. S2CID 144374454. Archived (PDF) from the original on 6 August 2023.
- Skocpol, Theda; Trimberger, Ellen Kay (1977). "Revolutions and the world-historical development of capitalism". Berkeley Journal of Sociology. 22: 101–113. JSTOR 41035248.
- Siker, Jeffrey S. (2017). "The Second and Third centuries". In Esler, Philip F. (ed.). The Early Christian World. Vol. 1 (second ed.). Routledge. ISBN 978-1-03-219935-1.
- Smith, John Howard (2014). The First Great Awakening: Redefining Religion in British America, 1725–1775 (reprint ed.). Rowman & Littlefield. ISBN 978-1-61147-715-3.
- Southern, Patricia (2015). The Roman Empire from Severus to Constantine (2nd ed.). Routledge. ISBN 978-1-317-49694-6.
- Spater, Jeremy; Tranvik, Isak (1 November 2019). "The Protestant Ethic Reexamined: Calvinism and Industrialization". Comparative Political Studies. 52 (13–14): 1963–1994. doi:10.1177/0010414019830721. ISSN 0010-4140. S2CID 204438351.
- Stark, Rodney (1996). The Rise of Christianity: A Sociologist Reconsiders History. Princeton: Princeton University Press. ISBN 978-0-691-02749-4.
- Štefan, Ivo (2022). "6". In Curta, Florin (ed.). The Routledge Handbook of East, Central and Eastern Europe in the Middle Ages, 500–1300. Routledge. pp. 101–120. ISBN 978-0-367-22655-8.
- Stephenson, David (2009). Heavenly Vaults: From Romanesque to Gothic in European Architecture (illustrated ed.). Princeton Architectural Press. ISBN 978-1-56898-840-5.
- Stewart, Alistair C. (2014). The Original Bishops: Office and Order in the First Christian Communities. Baker Academic. ISBN 978-1-4412-4570-0.
- Stewart, Colomba (2017). "Monasticism". In Esler, Philip F. (ed.). The Early Christian World. Vol. 1 (second ed.). Routledge. ISBN 978-1-03-219935-1.
- Stroumsa, Guy G. (2007). "Religious dynamics between Christians and Jews in late antiquity (312–640)". In Casiday, A.; Norris, F. W. (eds.). Cambridge History of Christianity. Vol. 2. Cambridge University Press. ISBN 978-1-139-05413-3.
- Strout, Shawn (2016). "Jesus' Table Fellowship, Baptism, and the Eucharist". Anglican Theological Review. 98 (3). Sage: 479–494. doi:10.1177/000332861609800303.
- Swanson, Robert (2021). "Medieval Anticlericalism: Terms and Conditions". History of Religions. 61 (1). The University of Chicago Press: 1–135. doi:10.1086/714917. S2CID 237618411.
- Táíwò, Olúfémi (2010). How Colonialism Preempted Modernity in Africa. Bloomington: University of Indiana Press. ISBN 978-0-253-35374-0.
- Tallett, Frank (1991). Dechristianizing France: The Year II and the Revolutionary Experience. Hambledon Press. pp. 1–28. ISBN 978-1-85285-057-9.
- Tapie, Matthew (2017). "Christ, Torah, and the Faithfulness of God: The Concept of Supersessionism in "The Gifts and the Calling"". Studies in Christian-Jewish Relations. 12 (1). doi:10.6017/scjr.v12i1.9802.
- Tarver, Micheal; Slape, Emily (2016). "Christianos Nuevos". In Tarver, Micheal; Slape, Emily (eds.). The Spanish Empire: A Historical Encyclopedia. Vol. 1. Santa Barbara, California: ABC-Clio. pp. 210–212. ISBN 978-1-4408-4570-3.
- Taylor, Molly E. (2021). "Eschatology and Exile: The Crisis of the Fourteenth Century". Bishop Street: Student Journal of Theological Studies. 109.
- Testa, Judith Anne (1998). "10, The Christian Catacombs". Rome is Love Spelled Backward (Roma Amor): Enjoying Art and Architecture in the Eternal City. Northern Illinois University Press. ISBN 978-0-87580-576-4.
- Thomas, Charles (1997). "Evidence for Christianity in Roman Britain. The Small Finds. By CF Mawer. BAR British Series 243. Tempus Reparatum, Oxford, 1995. Pp. vi+ 178, illus. ISBN 0-86054-789-2". Britannia (Book review). 28: 506–507. doi:10.2307/526801. JSTOR 526801. S2CID 191997942.
- Thompson, Glen L. (28 June 2012). "Constantius II and the first removal of the Altar of Victory". In Aubert, Jean-Jacques; Várhelyi, Zsuzsanna (eds.). A Tall Order. Writing the Social History of the Ancient World: Essays in honor of William V. Harris (illustrated ed.). Walter de Gruyter. ISBN 978-3-11-093141-9.
- Thompson, James Westfall (2016). "The Papacy and the War of investiture". History of the Middle Ages 300–1500. Taylor & Francis. ISBN 978-1-317-21700-8.
- Tilley, Maureen (2006). "North Africa". In Mitchell, M.; Young, F. (eds.). The Cambridge History of Christianity. Vol. 1. Cambridge University Press. pp. 380–396. doi:10.1017/CHOL9780521812399.021.
- Towns, Elmer L.; Whaley, Vernon M. (2012). Worship Through the Ages: How the Great Awakenings Shape Evangelical Worship (illustrated ed.). B&H Publishing Group. ISBN 978-1-4336-7257-6.
- Trombley, Frank (2006). "Overview: the geographical spread of Christianity". In Mitchell, Margaret M.; Young, Francis M. (eds.). The Cambridge History of Christianity. Vol. 1. Cambridge University Press. pp. 302–313. doi:10.1017/CHOL9780521812443. ISBN 978-1-139-05413-3.
- Truran, Margaret (2000). "Benedictine Thought". In Hastings, Adrian; Mason, Alistair; Pyper, Hugh S. (eds.). The Oxford Companion to Christian Thought. Oxford University Press. ISBN 978-0-19-860024-4.
- Tulloch, Janet (2004). "Art and Archaeology as an Historical Resource for the Study of Women in Early Christianity: An Approach for Analyzing Visual Data". Feminist Theology. 12 (3): 277–304. doi:10.1177/096673500401200303. S2CID 145361724.
- Tyerman, Christopher (1992). "Who went on Crusades to the Holy Land?". In Ḳedar, Benjamin Z. (ed.). The Horns of Hattin Proceedings of the 2nd Conference of the Society for the Study of the Crusades and the Latin East, Jerusalem and Haifa, 2–6 July, 1987. University of Michigan. pp. 13–26.
- Udeani, Chibueze C. (2007). Inculturation as Dialogue Igbo Culture and the Message of Christ. Rodopi (Brill). ISBN 978-90-420-2229-4.
- Ullmann, Walter (2005). A Short History of the Papacy in the Middle Ages (2nd ed.). New York: Routledge. ISBN 978-0-203-34952-6.
- Ullmann, Walter (1965). "The Papacy as an Institution of Government in the Middle Ages". Studies in Church History. 2 (2): 78–101. doi:10.1017/S0424208400005131.
- Ullmann, Walter (1972). The Growth of Papal Government in the Middle Ages (first ed.). Routledge. doi:10.4324/9780203707524. ISBN 978-0-203-34952-6.
- Uthemann, Karl Heinz (2007). "History of Christology to the seventh century". In Casiday, A.; Norris, F. W. (eds.). The Cambridge History of Christianity. Vol. 2. Cambridge University Press. pp. 460–500. ISBN 978-1-139-05413-3.
- Van Dam, Raymond (1985). "From Paganism to Christianity at Late Antique Gaza". Viator. 16: 1–20. doi:10.1484/J.VIATOR.2.301417.
- Van Engen, John (1986). "The Christian Middle Ages as an Historiographical Problem". The American Historical Review. 91 (3): 519–552. doi:10.2307/1869130. JSTOR 1869130.
- Van Nuffelen, Peter (2020). "Religious violence in late antiquity". In Fagan, Garrett G.; Fibiger, Linda; Hudson, Mark; Trundle, Matthew (eds.). The Cambridge world history of violence, volume 1: the prehistoric and ancient worlds. Cambridge University Press. pp. 512–529. ISBN 978-1-108-88290-3.
- Vaughn, Sally N. (1980). "St Anselm and the English investiture controversy reconsidered". Journal of Medieval History. 6 (1): 61–86. doi:10.1016/0304-4181(80)90028-7.
- Verger, Jacques (1995). "The Universities and Scholasticism". In McKitterick, Rosamond; Abulafia, David (eds.). The New Cambridge Medieval History. Vol. 5, c.1198 – c.1300. Cambridge University Press. pp. 256–276. ISBN 978-0-521-36289-4.
- Walker, Gabrielle (2013). Antarctica: An Intimate Portrait of a Mysterious Continent. Houghton Mifflin Harcourt. pp. 267–271. ISBN 978-0-15-101520-7.
- Walters, Philip (10 November 2005). "A survey of Soviet religious policy". In Ramet, Sabrina (ed.). Religious Policy in the Soviet Union. Cambridge University Press. pp. 3–30. ISBN 978-0-521-41643-6.
- Ward, W. (2006). "Evangelical awakenings in the North Atlantic world". In Brown, Stewart; Tackett, Timothy (eds.). The Cambridge History of Christianity. Vol. 7. Cambridge University Press. pp. 329–347. doi:10.1017/CHOL9780521816052.019. ISBN 978-1-139-05412-6.
- Ware, Steven (1999). "Restoring the New Testament Church: Varieties of Restorationism in the Radical Holiness Movement of the Late Nineteenth and Early Twentieth Centuries". Pneuma. 21. Brill: 233–250. doi:10.1163/157007499X00161.
- Ware, Timothy (1993). The Orthodox Church: An Introduction to Eastern Christianity (New ed.). Penguin. ISBN 978-0-141-92500-4.
- Weber, Max; Kalberg, Stephen (2012) [1905]. The Protestant Ethic and the Spirit of Capitalism. Routledge. ISBN 978-1-57958-338-5.
- Weitzmann, Kurt (1979). Weitzmann, Kurt (ed.). Age of Spirituality: Late Antique and Early Christian Art, Third to Seventh Century (Illustrated ed.). Metropolitan Museum of Art. ISBN 978-0-87099-179-0.
- Weitzmann, Kurt (1966). "Various Aspects of Byzantine Influence on the Latin Countries from the Sixth to the Twelfth Century". Dumbarton Oaks Papers. 20: 1–24. doi:10.2307/1291240. JSTOR 1291240.
- Westcott, Brooke Foss (2005). A General Survey of the History of the Canon of the New Testament. Wipf and Stock Publishers. ISBN 978-1-72521-423-1.
- Westerholm, Stephen (Spring 2015). "The New Perspective on Paul in Review". Direction. 44 (1): 4–15.
- Whalen, Brett Edward (2015). "The Papacy". In Swanson, R. N. (ed.). The Routledge History of Medieval Christianity: 1050–1500 (Illustrated ed.). Routledge. ISBN 978-0-415-66014-3.
- White, L. Michael (2017). "Early Christian Architecture the first five centuries". In Esler, Philip F. (ed.). The Early Christian World. Vol. II (second ed.). Routledge. ISBN 978-1-03-219935-1.
- Wiemer, Hans-Ulrich (1994). "Libanius on Constantine". The Classical Quarterly. 44 (2): 511–524. doi:10.1017/S0009838800043962. JSTOR 639654.
- Wigelsworth, Jeffrey R. (2006). Science and Technology in Medieval European Life. Bloomsbury Publishing USA. ISBN 978-0-313-07180-5.
- Wilken, Robert Louis (2013). The First Thousand Years: A Global History of Christianity. New Haven, CT: Yale University Press. ISBN 978-0-300-11884-1. JSTOR j.ctt32bd7m.5. S2CID 160590164.
- Williams, George Huntston (1995). The Radical Reformation (3rd ed.). Penn State Press. ISBN 978-0-271-09134-1.
- Williams, Rowan (1987). "Judith Herrin, The Formation of Christendom". New Left Review. 170 (122).
- Wogaman, J. Philip (2011). Christian Ethics A Historical Introduction. Westminster John Knox. ISBN 978-0-664-23409-6.
- Wood, Cindy (2016). Studying Late Medieval History A Thematic Approach. Taylor & Francis. ISBN 978-1-317-21120-4.
- Woods, Thomas Jr.; Canizares, Antonio (2012). How the Catholic Church Built Western Civilization. Regnery. ISBN 978-1-59698-328-1.
- Wylen, Stephen M. (1995). The Jews in the Time of Jesus: An Introduction. Paulist Press. ISBN 978-0-8091-3610-0.
- Young, Frances M. (2006). "Prelude: Jesus Christ, foundation of Christianity". In Mitchell, M.; Young, F. (eds.). The Cambridge History of Christianity. Vol. 1. Cambridge University Press. pp. 1–34. doi:10.1017/CHOL9780521812399.002. ISBN 978-1-139-05483-6.
- Zachariadou, Elizabeth (2006). "The Great Church in captivity 1453–1586". In Angold, Michael (ed.). The Cambridge History of Christianity. Vol. 5. Cambridge University Press. pp. 169–186. doi:10.1017/CHOL9780521811132.009. ISBN 978-1-139-05408-9.
- Zagorin, Perez (2003). How the Idea of Religious Toleration Came to the West (Repr. ed.). Princeton University Press. ISBN 978-0-691-09270-6.
- Zurlo, Gina A. (2020). "A Demographic Profile of Christianity in East and Southeast Asia". In Ross, Kenneth R.; Alvarez, Francis D.; Johnson, Todd M. (eds.). Christianity in East and Southeast Asia (Illustrated ed.). Edinburgh University Press. ISBN 978-1-4744-5162-8.

=== Encyclopedia & web sources ===
- "Why the Chinese government is targeting young Christians in its latest crackdown". America magazine. 14 May 2018. Archived from the original on 20 July 2021.
- Bodian, Miriam. "The Church and the Jews/Medieval Europe". University of Texas.
- Fahmy, Dalia (2022). "How U.S. religious composition has changed in recent decades". Modeling the Future of America in American Religion. Pew.
- Hackett, Conrad; McClendon, David (5 April 2017). "Christians remain world's largest religious group, but they are declining in Europe". Pew Research Center.
- Haider, Huma (16 February 2017). "The Persecution of Christians in the Middle East" (PDF). K4D. Publishing Service U.K. Government.
- Halsall, Paul (2021) [1996]. "Medieval Sourcebook: Iconoclastic Council, 754 – Epitome of the definition of the iconoclastic Conciliabulum, held in Constantinople, A.D. 754". Internet History Sourcebooks Project. New York: Fordham University Center for Medieval Studies at the Fordham University. Archived from the original on 21 March 2022.
- Hebron, M. (2022). "Patronage in the Renaissance". In Sgarbi, M. (ed.). Encyclopedia of Renaissance Philosophy. Springer. pp. 2446–2449. doi:10.1007/978-3-319-14169-5_1150. ISBN 978-3-319-14168-8.
- Hudson, Miles (22 May 2023). "Fall of Constantinople". Encyclopædia Britannica. Archived from the original on 25 June 2023.
- "Key Findings From the Global Religious Futures Project". Pew Research Center. PEW. 2017.
- Majumdar, Samirah (18 December 2024). "Number of countries where religious groups were harassed reached new peak level in 2022". Religious Freedom & Restrictions. PEW Research Center.
- Monter, William (2023). "Witch Trials, Europe". Encyclopedia of Sex and Gender: Culture Society History. Archived from the original on 14 July 2023 – via Encyclopedia.com.
- Neusner, J. (1972). "Judaism in a time of crisis: Four responses to the destruction of the second temple". ProQuest 1304353371.
- Noll, Mark (2009). "Science, Religion, and A.D. White: Seeking Peace in the "Warfare Between Science and Theology"" (PDF). The Biologos Foundation. Archived from the original (PDF) on 22 March 2015.
- Nowell, Charles E.; Magdoff, Harry; Webster, Richard A. (13 November 2022). "Western colonialism". Encyclopædia Britannica. Archived from the original on 20 November 2018.
- O'Hara, Luke (5 February 2022). "The Galleon, the Tyrant and the 26 Martyrs of Nagasaki". National Catholic Register.
- "1. Orthodox Christianity's geographic center remains in Central and Eastern Europe". Pew Research Center. PEW. 2017.
- Parker, N. Geoffrey (2023). "The emergence of modern Europe, 1500–1648". The Wars of Religion. Encyclopædia Britannica. Archived from the original on 18 July 2023.
- Johnson, Todd M.; Grim, Brian J., eds. (2020). "All Religions (global totals)". World Religion Database. Leiden, Boston: BRILL, Boston University.
- "Religion in Africa 2022". Find Easy population & more. 26 October 2022. Archived from the original on 26 March 2023.
- Sullivan, Patricia (26 November 2006). "Anti-Communist Priest Gheorghe Calciu-Dumitreasa". The Washington Post. p. C09. Archived from the original on 3 February 2020.
- "Understanding the rapid rise of Charismatic Christianity in Southeast Asia". cmp.smu.edu.sg. Singapore Management University. 27 October 2017. Archived from the original on 29 January 2021.
- "The German churches and the Nazi state". Holocaust Encyclopedia. United States Holocaust Memorial Museum. Archived from the original on 29 July 2018.
- Valkenburgh, Sarah (1994). "A Dramatic Revival: The first great awakening in Connecticut" (PDF). schoolinfosystem.org. The Concord Review. Archived (PDF) from the original on 19 July 2023.
- Yoo, Wonji (2019). "The making of god's subject: Christian conversion and urban youth in china". ProQuest. University of Pittsburgh. ProQuest 2279903082. "recent Chinese converts in Beijing seem to be mainly young people. In her study on churches in Beijing, Gao Shining (2005) points out that Christians under 35 accounted for 39% of Beijing's Christian population until 1990s, but the number increased by 70% in 2000s. Moreover, a survey of college students at Renmin University of China in Beijing shows that 61.5% of respondents were interested in Christianity (Goossaert and Palmer 2011). See – Page 27 Footnote 7"
