= List of songs recorded by Bridgit Mendler =

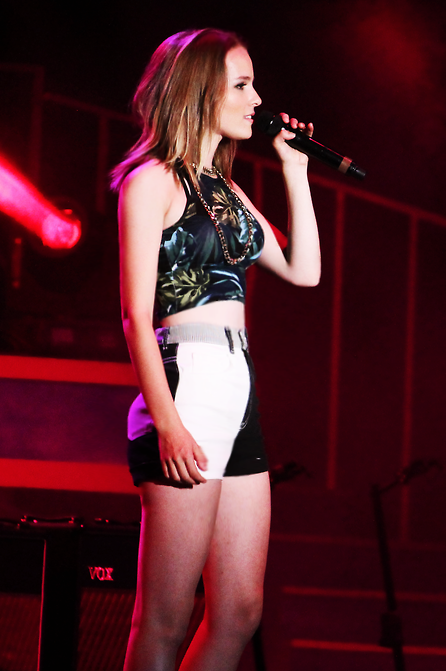
Mendler performing at Summer Tour in 2014.

American entrepreur and former actress and singer Bridgit Mendler has recorded songs for two studio albums, one soundtrack and some of which were collaborations with others.

Mendler's first soundtrack, Lemonade Mouth, peaked at number 4 on the Billboard 200. Her first single, "Somebody" debuted and peaked at number 89 in the US Billboard Hot 100 and sold 6,000 copies in the first week in the United States according to Nielsen SoundScan. Her second single, "Determinate" peaked at number 51 in the US Billboard Hot 100 and charting in two more countries. She was featured in the song, "Breakthrough" and debuted and peaked at number 88 in the US Billboard Hot 100.

On March 31, 2011, it was confirmed that Mendler had signed with Hollywood Records and had begun working on her debut album. In 2012, Mendler released her debut album Hello My Name Is..., which featured a pop sound. It debuted at number 30 on the US Billboard 200, and has sold over 200,000 copies. Her debut single off the album "Ready or Not", became an international Top 40 hit, the song was certified gold in Norway, and platinum in New Zealand, United States and Canada and peaked at number 49 on the Billboard Hot 100. It was announced that her second single would be "Hurricane". The video premiered on April 12, 2013 and was shot in London. "Hurricane" has been certified gold in the USA for selling 500,000 copies.

As of July 2, 2015, Mendler left Hollywood Records. She released the extended play Nemesis in 2016, which peaked at 46 on the Billboard's Independent Albums chart.

== Songs ==
Key
†	Indicates single release
#	Indicates promotional single release

Song	Artist(s)	Writer(s)	Album	Year	Ref.
"5:15"	Bridgit Mendler	Bridgit Mendler; Emanuel "Eman" Kiriakou; Priscilla Renea; Andrew "Goldstein" Goldstein	Hello My Name Is...	2012	
"All I See Is Gold"	Bridgit Mendler	Bridgit Mendler; Emanuel "Eman" Kiriakou; Andrew "Goldstein" Goldstein; Priscilla Renea	Hello My Name Is...	2012	
"Atlantis" †	Bridgit Mendler featuring Kaiydo	Bridgit Mendler; Spencer Bastian; Mischa Chillak; Keiondre "Kaiydo" Boone	Nemesis	2016	
"Blonde"	Bridgit Mendler	Bridgit Mendler; Leah Haywood; Daniel Pringle	Hello My Name Is...	2012	
"Breakthrough" †	Cast of Lemonade Mouth	Bryan Todd; Maria Christensen; Shridhar Solanki; Adam Hicks	Lemonade Mouth	2011	
"Can't Bring This Down"	Bridgit Mendler; Pell	Bridgit Mendler; Pell	TBA	2017	
"Christmas Is Coming"	Bridgit Mendler	Bridgit Mendler; Jamie Houston	N/A	2014	
"City Lights"	Bridgit Mendler	Bridgit Mendler; Salma Ali	Hello My Name Is...	2012	
"Dedication"	Bridgit Mendler	Bridgit Mendler; Anne Preven; Nico Hartikainen	N/A	2015	
"Deeper Shade Of Us"	Bridgit Mendler	Bridgit Mendler; Christopher J Baran; Anne Preven	N/A	2014	
"Determinate" †	Bridgit Mendler featuring Adam Hicks	Niclas Molinder; Joacim Persson; Johan Alkenäs; Charlie Mason, Ebony Burks; Adam Hicks	Lemonade Mouth	2011	
"Diving" †	Bridgit Mendler featuring RKCB	Bridgit Mendler; Spencer Bastian; Mischa Chillak; RKCB	N/A	2017	
"Do You Miss Me at All" †	Bridgit Mendler	Bridgit Mendler; Spencer Bastian; Mischa Chillak	Nemesis	2016	
"Echo"	Bridgit Mendler	Bridgit Mendler; Scott Matthew Hoffman; Cass Lowe	N/A	2015	
"Fly to You"	Bridgit Mendler	—N/a	N/A	2014	
"Forgot to Laugh"	Bridgit Mendler	Bridgit Mendler; Emanuel "Eman" Kiriakou; Andrew "Goldstein" Goldstein	Hello My Name Is...	2012	
"Hang in There Baby"	Bridgit Mendler	Aris Archontis; Jeannie Lurie; Chen Neeman	Make Your Mark: Ultimate Playlist	2010	
"Here We Go"	Cast of Lemonade Mouth	Ali Dee; Vincent Alfieri; Zach Danziger	Lemonade Mouth	2011	
"Hey Man"	Bridgit Mendler	Bridgit Mendler; Rob Ellmore; Leah Haywood; Daniel Pringle	N/A	2015	
"Hold On for Dear Love"	Bridgit Mendler	Bridgit Mendler; Donnell Shawn Butler; Freddy Wexler	Hello My Name Is...	2012	
"How to Believe"	Bridgit Mendler	Bridgit Mendler	Disney Fairies: Faith, Trust And Pixie Dust	2010	
"Hurricane" †	Bridgit Mendler	Bridgit Mendler; Emanuel "Eman" Kiriakou; Evan "Kidd" Bogart; Andrew "Goldstein" Goldstein	Hello My Name Is...	2012	
"I Can't Do This Anymore"	Bridgit Mendler	Bridgit Mendler; Ron Aniello	N/A	2014	
"I Was a Fool"	Bridgit Mendler	Tegan Quin; Sara Quin	Non-album single	2013	
"I'm Gonna Run to You"	Bridgit Mendler	Bridgit Mendler; Jamie Houston	Non-album single	2011	
"Library"	Bridgit Mendler	Bridgit Mendler; Spencer Bastian; Mischa Chillak	Nemesis	2016	
"Livin' on a High Wire"	Cast of Lemonade Mouth	Windy Wagner; Ken Stacey; David Walsh; Joleen Belle; Adam Hicks	Lemonade Mouth	2011	
"Love Will Tell Us Where to Go"	Bridgit Mendler	Bridgit Mendler; Emanuel "Eman" Kiriakou; Evan "Kidd" Bogart; Jai Marlon; David Ryan; Freddy Wexler	Hello My Name Is...	2012	
"More Than a Band"	Cast of Lemonade Mouth	Jeannie Lurie; Aris Archontis; Chen Neeman	Lemonade Mouth	2011	
"My Song for You"	Bridgit Mendler and Shane Harper	Kari Kimmel; Scott Krippayne	Disney Channel Holiday Playlist	2012	
"Never Forget You"	Bridgit Mendler	Bridgit Mendler; Scott Effman; Nate Nathansson	N/A	2015	
"Postcard"	Bridgit Mendler	Bridgit Mendler; Toby Gad	Hello My Name Is...	2012	
"Quicksand"	Bridgit Mendler	Bridgit Mendler; Emanuel "Eman" Kiriakou; Freddy Wexler	Hello My Name Is...	2012	
"Ready or Not" †	Bridgit Mendler	Bridgit Mendler; Emanuel "Eman" Kiriakou; Evan "Kidd" Bogart; Thom Bell; William Hart	Hello My Name Is...	2012	
"Rocks at My Window"	Bridgit Mendler	Bridgit Mendler; Emanuel "Eman" Kiriakou; Evan "Kidd" Bogart; Andrew "Goldstein" Goldstein	Hello My Name Is...	2012	
"Rome"	Bridgit Mendler	Bridgit Mendler	N/A	2014	
"Snap My Fingers"	Bridgit Mendler	Bridgit Mendler; Spencer Bastian; Mischa Chillak	Nemesis	2016	
"Somebody" †	Bridgit Mendler	Lindy Robbins; Reed Vertelney	Lemonade Mouth	2011	
"Summertime"	Bridgit Mendler	Bridgit Mendler	Non-album single	2011	
"Temperamental Love"	Bridgit Mendler	Bridgit Mendler; Devontée	TBA	2017	
"The Fall Song"	Bridgit Mendler	Bridgit Mendler; Emanuel "Eman" Kiriakou; Evan "Kidd" Bogart	Hello My Name Is...	2012	
"This Is My Paradise"	Bridgit Mendler	Bridgit Mendler	Non-album single	2011	
"Top of the World"	Bridgit Mendler	Bridgit Mendler; Donnell Shawn Butler; Freddy Wexler	Hello My Name Is...	2012	
"Turn Up the Music"	Bridgit Mendler	Adam Watts; Andy Dodd	Lemonade Mouth	2011	
"Undateable"	Bridgit Mendler and The Cast of Undateable	Bridgit Mendler; Brent Morin; The Cast of Undateable	Non-album single	2015	
"Wait for Me"	Shane Harper featuring Bridgit Mendler	Shane Harper; Bridgit Mendler	Shane Harper	2012	
"We Can Change the World"	Bridgit Mendler	Bridgit Mendler; Joacim Persson	Non-album single	2011	
"We're Dancing"	Bridgit Mendler	Bridgit Mendler; Josh Alexander; Billy Steinberg	Hello My Name Is...	2012	
"When She Loved Me"	Bridgit Mendler	Randy Newman	Disneymania 7	2010	
"Yoohoo"	Bridgit Mendler	Bridgit Mendler; Scott Effman; Nate Nathansson	N/A	2015	

== Unreleased songs ==
Song	Artist(s)	Writer(s)	Year	Note	Ref.
"Give Love a Try"	Nick Jonas featuring Bridgit Mendler	Nick Jonas; Joe Jonas	2009	Recorded to soundtrack of Jonas' season one, but the album was cancelled. Never leaked complete, just a teaser.	
"Talk to Me"	Bridgit Mendler	—N/a	2011	Failed to be included on Hello My Name Is.... On August 22, 2011, Mendler performed the song on Summer Night Concerts, in Vancouver, Canada. Never leaked.	
"Your Song"	Bridgit Mendler	Elton John; Bernie Taupin	2014	Elton John cover. Recorded to Good Luck Charlie's episode "Good Bye Charlie". Never leaked complete, just a teaser.	
"You're Something Beautiful"	Bridgit Mendler	—N/a	2012	Recorded to Good Luck Charlie's' special episode "Special Delivery". Never leaked complete, just a teaser.	
"Starry Eyed"	Ellie Goulding	Ellie Goulding; Jonny Lattimer	2013	Recorded to The Hurricane Sessions, performed on The Strawberry Alarm Clock, on the radio station FM104 and on Summer Tour.	

== See also ==
- Bridgit Mendler discography
