= Bridgit Mendler discography =

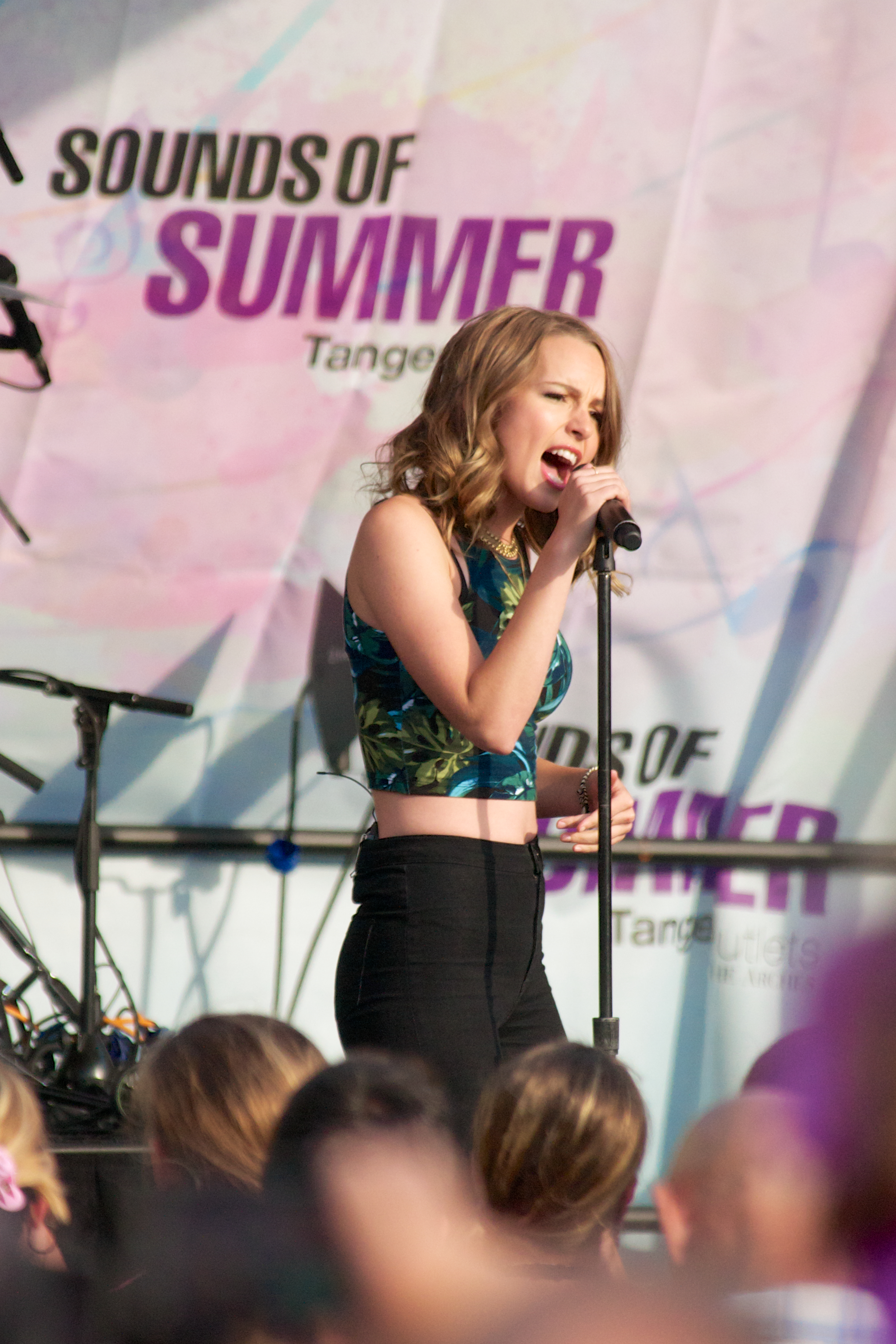
- Mendler performing in 2014
- Studio albums: 1
- Extended plays: 2
- Soundtrack albums: 1
- Singles: 10
- Music videos: 17
- Promotional singles: 6

The discography of Bridgit Mendler, an American entrepreneur and former actress and singer-songwriter, consists of one studio album, two extended plays, one soundtrack album, four singles, six promotional singles, twelve music videos and other album appearances.

Mendler's first soundtrack, Lemonade Mouth, has peaked at number 4 on the Billboard 200. Her first single, "Somebody" debuted and peaked at number 89 in the US Billboard Hot 100 and sold 6,000 copies in the first week in the United States according to Nielsen SoundScan. Her second single, "Determinate" peaked at number 51 on the US Billboard Hot 100 and charting in two more countries. She was featured in the song, "Breakthrough" and debuted and peaked at number 88 on the US Billboard Hot 100.

On March 31, 2011, it was confirmed that Mendler had signed with Hollywood Records and had begun working on her debut album. In 2012, Mendler released her debut album Hello My Name Is..., which featured a pop sound. It debuted at number 30 on the US Billboard 200, and has sold over 200,000 copies. Her debut single from the album "Ready or Not" became an international Top 40 hit, the song was certified gold in Norway, and platinum in New Zealand, United States and Canada and peaked at number 49 on the Billboard Hot 100. Her second single "Hurricane" has been certified gold in the USA for selling 500,000 copies.

With Black Box Records, Mendler independently released the extended play Nemesis in 2016, which peaked at 46 on the Billboard's Independent Albums chart.

== Albums ==
=== Studio albums ===
List of studio albums, with selected details, chart positions and certifications
Title	Album details	Peak chart positions						Sales
Title	Album details	US	AUS	FRA	POL	SPA	UK	Sales
Hello My Name Is...	Released: October 22, 2012; Formats: CD, LP, digital download, streaming; Label: Hollywood	30	58	95	17	26	107	US: 451,942

=== Soundtrack albums ===
List of soundtrack albums, with selected details, chart positions and certifications
Title	Album details	Peak chart positions								Sales
Title	Album details	US	AUS	AUT	BEL	NL	POL	SPA	UK	Sales
Lemonade Mouth	Released: April 12, 2011; Formats: CD, digital download, streaming, vinyl; Label: Walt Disney	4	71	38	25	79	26	38	173	US: 492,000

== Extended plays ==
List of extended plays, with selected chart positions
Title	EP details	Peak chart positions
Title	EP details	US Indie
Live in London	Released: March 18, 2013; Format: Streaming; Label: Universal	—
Nemesis	Released: November 18, 2016; Format: CD, digital download, streaming; Label: Black Box	46
"—" denotes releases that did not chart or were not released in that territory.

== Singles ==
=== As lead artist ===
List of singles as lead artist, with selected chart positions and certifications, showing year released and album name
Title	Year	Peak chart positions										Certifications	Album
Title	Year	US	AUS	AUT	BEL	CAN	DEN	IRL	NZ	SCO	UK	Certifications	Album
"Somebody"	2011	89	—	—	—	—	—	—	—	—	—	RIAA: Gold	Lemonade Mouth
"Determinate" (featuring Adam Hicks)	2011	51	91	—	—	82	—	—	—	—	111	RIAA: Platinum	Lemonade Mouth
"Ready or Not"	2012	49	53	25	50	43	36	15	12	6	7	RIAA: 2× Platinum; BPI: Platinum; IFPI DEN: Platinum; IFPI NOR: Gold; MC: Platinum; RMNZ: 2× Platinum	Hello My Name Is...
"Hurricane"	2013	— (Note: "Hurricane" did not enter the Billboard Hot 100, but peaked at number one on the Bubbling Under Hot 100 Singles chart.)	82	—	93	81	—	77	—	—	157	RIAA: Gold; RMNZ: Platinum	Hello My Name Is...
"Top of the World"	2013	—	—	—	—	—	—	—	—	—	—		Hello My Name Is...
"Atlantis" (featuring Kaiydo)	2016	—	—	—	—	—	—	—	—	—	—		Nemesis
"Do You Miss Me at All"	2016	—	—	—	—	—	—	—	—	—	—		Nemesis
"Temperamental Love" (featuring Devontée)	2017	—	—	—	—	—	—	—	—	—	—		Non-album singles
"Can't Bring This Down" (featuring Pell)	2017	—	—	—	—	—	—	—	—	—	—		Non-album singles
"Diving" (featuring RKCB)	2017	—	—	—	—	—	—	—	—	—	—		Non-album singles
"—" denotes releases that did not chart or were not released in that territory.

=== As featured artist ===
List of singles as featured artist, with selected chart positions, showing year released and album name
Title	Year	Peak chart positions		Album
Title	Year	US	UK	Album
"Breakthrough" (as part of Lemonade Mouth cast)	2011	88	200	Lemonade Mouth
"Wait for Me" (Shane Harper featuring Bridgit Mendler)	2011	—	—	Shane Harper
"—" denotes releases that did not chart or were not released in that territory.

=== Promotional singles ===
List of promotional singles, showing year released and album name
Song	Year	Album
"This Is My Paradise"	2011	Non-album promotional singles
"We Can Change the World"	2011	Non-album promotional singles
"I'm Gonna Run to You"	2011	Non-album promotional singles
"Summertime"	2012	Non-album promotional singles
"Forgot to Laugh"	2012	Hello My Name Is...

== Other charted songs ==
List of singles, with selected chart positions
Title	Year	Peak chart positions		Album
Title	Year	US Bub	US Holiday	Album
"Turn Up the Music"	2011	12	—	Lemonade Mouth
"My Song for You" (with Shane Harper)	2012	—	3	Disney Channel Holiday Playlist
"—" denotes releases that did not chart or were not released in that territory.

== Guest appearances ==
Title	Year	Other artist(s)	Album
"Give Love a Try"	2009	Nick Jonas	Jonas
"When She Loved Me"	2010	—N/a	Disneymania 7
"How to Believe"	2012	—N/a	Disney Fairies: Faith, Trust And Pixie Dust
"Hang in There Baby"	2012	—N/a	Make Your Mark: Ultimate Playlist
"We’re Dancing" (Alex Ghenea 3.0 Remix)	2013	—N/a	Shake It Up: I Love Dance

Other credits

Title	Year	Artist	Credit	Album
"Free Spirit"	2008	Alyson Stoner	Backing vocals	Alice Upside Down

== Music videos ==
List of music videos, showing year released and director
Title	Year	Other artist(s)	Director(s)	Ref.
As lead artist
"How to Believe"	2010	None	Bradley Raymond	
"This Is My Paradise"	2010	None	Unknown	
"Somebody"	2011	None	Brandon Dickerson	
"We Can Change the World"	2011	None	Art Spigel	
"I'm Gonna Run to You"	2011	None	Arlene Sanford	
"Summertime"	2012	None	Art Spigel	
"Ready or Not"	2012	None	Philip Andelman	
"I Was a Fool" (Tegan and Sara Cover)	2013	None	Bridgit Mendler	
"Hurricane"	2013	None	Robert Hales	
"Top of the World"	2013	None	Matt Wyatt	
"Undateable"	2015	Brent Morin	Scott Ellis	
"Atlantis"	2016	Kaiydo	Allie Avital	
"Do You Miss Me at All"	2016	None	Unknown	
"Library" (Acoustic)	2016	None	Unknown	
"Temperamental Love"	2017	Devontée	Bridgit Mendler and Vladimir Sepetov	
"Can't Bring This Down"	2017	Pell	Vladimir Sepetov	
"Diving"	2017	RKCB	Bridgit Mendler and Vladimir Sepetov	
Guest appearances
"Rocketship"	2012	Shane Harper	Unknown	
