= Shishir Kurup =

American actor (born 1961)

- Born: Shishir Ravindran Kurup
- Occupation: Actor

Shishir Ravindran Kurup is an American actor. He played Dr. Singh on the sci-fi series Surface, and also had roles on the series Heroes, Lost and True Blood.

He made a guest appearance as Dr. Singh in Good Luck Charlie with Bridgit Mendler and after that, he played Mo Banjaree's father in Lemonade Mouth, reuniting with Mendler, who portrayed shy and innocent Olivia White, and becoming close friends with his co-star and TV daughter, Naomi Scott and her parents, eventually visiting them in London after shooting the movie.
