= Turn Up the Music (Bridgit Mendler song) =

Song by Bridgit Mendler

from the album Lemonade Mouth
- Released: 2011
- Recorded: 2010
- Genre: Pop; pop rock
- Length: 2:56
- Label: Walt Disney
- Songwriter(s): Adam Watts; Andy Dodd
- Producer(s): Andy Dodd

"Turn Up the Music" is a song performed by American pop recording artist Bridgit Mendler for the soundtrack Lemonade Mouth to the Disney Channel television movie of the same name. It was written by Adam Watts and Andy Dodd and produced by Andy Dodd. The song peaked, at number 12 on the US Billboard Bubbling Under Hot 100 Singles and at 18 on the Kid Digital Songs.

== Background and composition ==
"Somebody" is written by Adam Watts and Andy Dodd and produced by Bryan Todd. Musically, the song is prominent pop rock that runs through a pop oriented beat. Mendler's vocals span from the low note of F♯_{3} to the high note of E♭_{5}.

== Critical reception ==
Bob Hoose of Pluggedin said that "Turn Up the Music" is sunny and, ironically, pessimistic song, because it portrays the reality of teenagers when speaking of the uncertain future and freedom that music brings. The Disney Dreaming commented that the song is a "super catchy beat and fun lyrics" and also adorable, humorous and encourages listeners to hear the rest of the album.

== Chart performance ==
The song debuted, and peaked, at number 12 on the US Billboard Bubbling Under Hot 100 Singles. In the Kid Digital Songs "Turn Up the Music" peaked at number 18.

== Charts ==
Chart (2011)	Peak position
US Kid Digital Songs (Billboard)	18
US Bubbling Under Hot 100 Singles (Billboard)	12
