= Horrible Bosses (soundtrack) =

Horrible Bosses (Original Motion Picture Soundtrack)

Soundtrack album by Christopher Lennertz
- Released: July 5, 2011
- Studios: The Village; Capitol Studios
- Genres: Film score; classic rock
- Length: 62:55
- Label: WaterTower Music
- Producers: Christopher Lennertz; Jess Stroup; Todd Bozung

Christopher Lennertz chronology
Lemonade Mouth (2011)	Horrible Bosses (2011)	Think Like a Man (2012)

Horrible Bosses (Original Motion Picture Soundtrack) is the soundtrack to the 2011 film of the same name, released by WaterTower Music on July 5, 2011. The album features 33 tracks from the score composed by Christopher Lennertz and contributions from Mike McCready of Pearl Jam, Stefan Lessard of Dave Matthews Band and Money Mark—a collaborator with the Beastie Boys; the trio further worked with Matt Chamberlain, David Levita, Aaron Kaplan, Victor Indrizzo, Chris Chaney, Davey Chegwidden and DJ Cheapshot to develop the music.

== Development ==
Lennertz recorded the soundtrack at The Village recording studio in West Los Angeles and Capitol Records. Lennertz attempted to remain "authentic" to the characters' progression from average worker to calculated killer. To achieve this aim, he decided against recording digitally, instead recording the tracks on two-inch analog tape, intending each musical cue to sound as if it was emanating from a vinyl record. He explained, "The idea was to put together a band that would record the score together the same way that they would make an album. It isn't over-produced or shiny and digital in any way. It's brash, noisy, and full of bravado and swagger. I knew that if we could harness some of this sonic magic in the score, then the toughness and confidence of the music would play against Bateman, Sudeikis, and Charlie Day to really emphasize and elevate the humor in the situations that transpire." Lennertz continued, "We tracked through tape before Pro Tools to get that fat sound, and made every choice based on feel rather than perfection. We even used the same Wurlitzer that Money Mark played on Beck's classic ‘Where It's At’. At the end of the day, Seth [Gordon] and I wanted to produce a score that is as irreverent and full of attitude as the movie itself. I think we did it...and most of all, everyone had a blast in the process."

== Track listing ==
Horrible Bosses: The Original Motion Picture Soundtrack
No.	Title	Artist	Length
1.	"Motel Meet Up"	Christopher Lennertz, Mike McCready & Money Mark	1:13
2.	"Total F**king A*****e"	Christopher Lennertz	2:34
3.	"Heart Attack"	Christopher Lennertz, Mike McCready & Money Mark	0:51
4.	"Whose Promotion?"	Christopher Lennertz	1:31
5.	"F**ker"	Christopher Lennertz, Mike McCready, Money Mark & Chris Chaney	2:38
6.	"Hey Dickwad...What the F**k?"	Christopher Lennertz, Mike McCready & Dave Levita	1:43
7.	"Can You See My P***y?"	Christopher Lennertz	1:38
8.	"Let's Kill This Bitch"	Christopher Lennertz, Mike McCready, Money Mark & Chris Chaney	0:25
9.	"Gimme That Dong Dale"	Christopher Lennertz, Stefan Lessard, Money Mark & Matt Chamberlain	0:59
10.	"Wet Work"	Christopher Lennertz	1:39
11.	"Men Seeking A Man"	Christopher Lennertz	0:51
12.	"Mother F**ker Jones"	Christopher Lennertz, Money Mark, Victor Indrizzo & Chris Chaney	0:59
13.	"Douchebag Museum"	Christopher Lennertz	1:14
14.	"Crazy Bitch W***e"	Christopher Lennertz, Stefan Lessard, Money Mark & Matt Chamberlain	1:23
15.	"Coke In A Dustbuster"	Christopher Lennertz, Stefan Lessard, Money Mark & Matt Chamberlain	3:13
16.	"Four Honks"	Christopher Lennertz	1:03
17.	"These People F**king Love Cats"	Christopher Lennertz, Money Mark & Dave Levita	1:47
18.	"P***s...Peanuts"	Christopher Lennertz, Mike McCready, Money Mark & Victor Indrizzo	1:28
19.	"Raped In Prison"	Christopher Lennertz & Money Mark	1:08
20.	"Harkin Finds The Phone"	Christopher Lennertz	1:08
21.	"We Got The Cheese"	Christopher Lennertz, Mike McCready, Money Mark & Chris Chaney	1:02
22.	"P***s Shaped Food"	Christopher Lennertz, Stefan Lessard, Money Mark & Matt Chamberlain	0:48
23.	"Ipso Facto"	Christopher Lennertz, Stefan Lessard & Davey Chedwiggen	1:10
24.	"Blackmailing Harkin"	Christopher Lennertz, Stefan Lessard, Money Mark & Aaron Kaplan	2:41
25.	"Car Chase...Dancing On Boobies"	Christopher Lennertz, Mike McCready, Money Mark & Chris Chaney	1:26
26.	"Confessing To Gregory"	Christopher Lennertz, Cheapshot & Aaron Kaplan	1:48
27.	"Harkin Goes Down...I F**ked Your Wife"	Christopher Lennertz, Mike McCready & Aaron Kaplan	3:18
28.	"Oh F**k"	Christopher Lennertz, Money Mark & Chris Chaney	1:53
29.	"P*****gIn A Playground"	Christopher Lennertz, Chris Chaney, Money Mark & Victor Indrizzo	3:07
30.	"Tour Of The Mouth"	Christopher Lennertz, Money Mark, Victor Indrizzo & Dave Levita	3:21
31.	"Your Balls Are So Smooth"	Christopher Lennertz, Money Mark, Victor Indrizzo & Chris Chaney	3:04
32.	"Murdering Some Ass"	Christopher Lennertz, Mike McCready, Money Mark & Chris Chaney	7:12
33.	"This Is How I Roll"	Money Mark	2:20
Total length:			1:02:55

== Film music not included in the album ==
- "The Underdog" – Spoon
- "Crazy" – Booker T. Jones
- "Learn to Lose" – Hockey
- "Sabotage" – Beastie Boys
- "Sydney (I’ll Come Running)" – Brett Dennen
- "Lay Me Down" – Dirty Heads
- "Beatin' Down the Block" – B.A.S.K.O.
- "How You Like Me Now?" – The Heavy
- "The Message" – Cymande
- "Koo Koo Rocks" – With the Quickness
- "Kung Fu Fighting" – Carl Douglas
- "That's Not My Name" – The Ting Tings
- "Perfect Day" – The Constellations
- "MoneyGrabber" – Fitz and the Tantrums
- "I Be Doin’ It" – Classic
- "Rhythm of the Night" – DeBarge
- "This is How I Roll" – Money Mark

== Reception ==
Gregory Heaney of AllMusic wrote that "the film's score adds an element of seriousness to the on-screen comedy, providing a nice sense of balance to this ensemble black comedy." Dan Goldwasser of Soundtrack.Net wrote "The score by Chris Lennertz is fun and energetic, primarily rock-band based, playing out the tension of the scenes and driving the characters forward."

== Personnel ==
Album credits

- Music – Christopher Lennertz
- Additional music – Money Mark, Jess Stroup
- Music production – Christopher Lennertz, Jess Stroup, Todd Bozung
- Co-producer – Jeff Vaughn, Money Mark
- Recording – Kevin Globerman, Larry Mah, Jeff Vaughn
- Mixing – Jeff Vaughn
- Mastering – Stephen Marsh
- Score editor – Todd Bozung
- Assistant score editor – Jaclyn Newman
- Assistant engineer – Charlie Paakkari, Ghian Wright, Vanessa Parr
- Orchestration – Andrew Kinney
- Contractor – David Low
- Music co-ordinator – Anne Roever, Kim Baum, Libby Umstead
- Copyist – Steve Juliani Music
- Executive producer – Seth Gordon, Dana Sano, Erin Scully
- Music supervisor – Dana Sano

Performer credits

- Bass – Chris Chaney, Stefan Lessard
- Drums – Matt Chamberlain, Victor Indrizzo
- Electric guitar – David Levita, Mike McCready
- Guitar – Aaron Kaplan
- Keyboards, vocals, toy – Money Mark
- Percussion – Davey Chegwidden
- Remix, turntables – DJ Cheapshot
