= Hop (soundtrack) =

2011 film soundtrack album

Hop (Original Motion Picture Soundtrack)

Soundtrack album by Christopher Lennertz
- Released: March 29, 2011 (digital); April 5, 2011 (physical)
- Recorded: 2011
- Studios: Eastwood Scoring Stage, Warner Bros. Studios Burbank
- Genre: Film score
- Length: 53:50
- Labels: Back Lot Music (Note: Digital releases); Varèse Sarabande (Note: Physical releases)
- Producers: Christopher Lennertz; DeeTown Entertainment

Christopher Lennertz chronology
Camp Rock 2: The Final Jam (2010)	Hop (2011)	Lemonade Mouth (2011)

Hop (Original Motion Picture Soundtrack) is the soundtrack album for the 2011 film of the same name, directed by Tim Hill and produced by Illumination Entertainment for Universal Pictures. The score was composed by Christopher Lennertz, marking his second collaboration with Hill after Alvin and the Chipmunks (2007). The soundtrack, recorded at the Eastwood Scoring Stage, was released by Back Lot Music on iTunes, Amazon Music, and Spotify on March 29, 2011, and by Varèse Sarabande on CD on April 5.

== Background ==
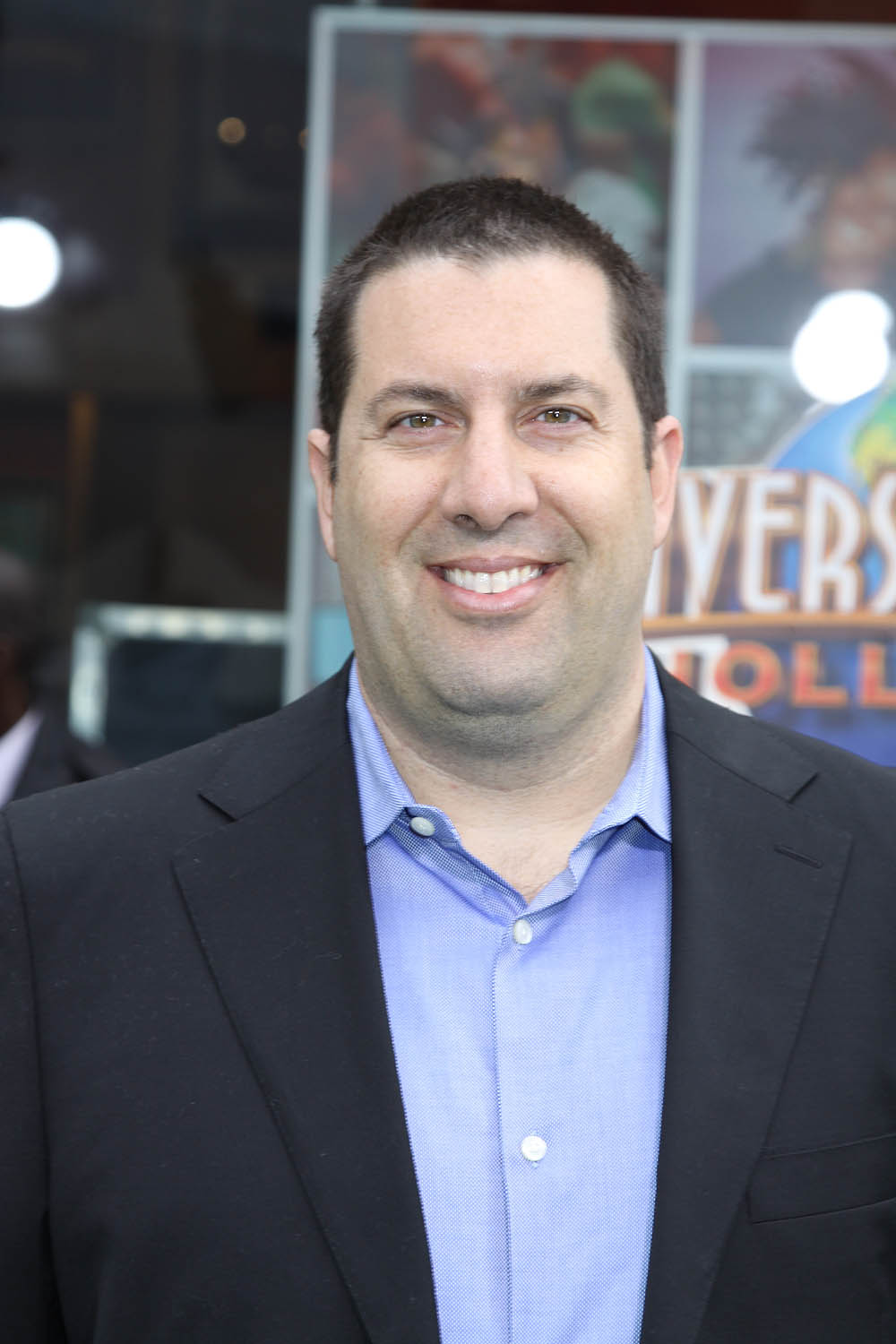
Christopher Lennertz, pictured at the film's premiere at Universal Studios Hollywood.

Christopher Lennertz was revealed to be composing the score for Hop on March 6, 2011, marking his second collaboration with Tim Hill after Alvin and the Chipmunks (2007). The scoring for the film took place at the Eastwood Scoring Stage at Warner Bros. Studios in Burbank, California. The score was performed by a large ensemble of the Hollywood Studio Symphony.

A 35th track, titled "The Pink Berets", is included in the soundtrack. Lennertz wrote the song with Ali Theodore (of DeeTown Entertainment), Bryan Spitzer, Jordan Yaeger, and Julian Michael Davis. The Deekompressors performed the song. Australian pop singer Cody Simpson performed a cover of the Strangeloves' 1965 standard "I Want Candy" for the film (with Bow Wow Wow's 1982 version previously being featured in some trailers for the film).

In an interview with Rebecca Murray of About.com (now People Inc.), Christopher Lennertz stated: "I got hired before they even started shooting because of Tim [Hill], and then I was writing music as they went along because there are a lot of scenes in where E.B. is actually playing bongo drums and things like that. I would write pieces that they would then animate the bunny to, and then I would fill it out with orchestra later. When asked if making music for an animated bunny was "weird", Lennertz stated: "It was crazy, but you know what? We knew it was going to be Russell [Brand] the whole time and that changed everything because we tried to give him an attitude that would match his dialogue, and I think it worked. I think we have him as sort of the awesome, weise guy bunny. It's pretty great."

The Japanese dub features an exclusive theme song called "Hug Tomo" by Not Yet.

== Release ==
Hop (Original Motion Picture Soundtrack) was released by Back Lot Music on iTunes, Amazon Music, and Spotify on March 29, 2011, while Varèse Sarabande released it on CD on April 5.

== Reception ==
Daniel Schweiger of Assignment X gave the score a positive review, writing: "[...] Lennertz gives an emotionally wistful, Xmas-like magic to the score's boundless energy, music that helps Hop rise to its Santa Clause-like allusions of creating a whole other dimension of non-denominational Christina holiday helpers, bells and happy melodies that would convince any human to chuck it all to become a messenger of good cheer."

== Track listing ==
All tracks are written by Christopher Lennertz.

No.	Title	Writer(s)	Length
1.	"Prologue / Easter Island"		2:06
2.	"Candy Factory"		3:06
3.	"Young Fred Gets A Visit"		2:52
4.	"O'Hare's Intervention"		1:03
5.	"Don't Want To Be The Easter Bunny"		1:33
6.	"The Accident"		1:46
7.	"Lament"		0:32
8.	"In The Garage"		1:18
9.	"Carlos Reports"		1:49
10.	"Summon The Pink Berets"		1:13
11.	"Pooping Jellybeans"		0:51
12.	"Fred Remembers"		0:28
13.	"Late For Interview"		1:19
14.	"EB Escapes"		1:16
15.	"Fred's Tour"		1:10
16.	"Got The Blues"		0:42
17.	"Dad Misses His Son"		1:47
18.	"Back To The Mansion"		0:41
19.	"Sam's Visit"		2:39
20.	"The Hoff"		0:26
21.	"Fathers Just Don't Get It"		0:41
22.	"Fred's Realization"		0:36
23.	"Be The Bunny"		3:23
24.	"Pink Berets Take Fred"		1:03
25.	"Back To Easter Island"		2:39
26.	""Coup De Tat""		0:51
27.	"Oh, The Guilt"		0:44
28.	"Easter Moon Rises"		1:51
29.	"Carlos Takes Control"		2:22
30.	"Transformation"		2:03
31.	"Air Traffic Control"		1:24
32.	"Reunion / Proclamation"		2:26
33.	"Brunch"		0:55
34.	"The Big Finale"		1:53
35.	"The Pink Berets" (The Deekompressors)	Christopher Lennertz; Ali Theodore; Julian Michael Davis; Jordan Yaeger; Brian Spitzer	2:24
Total length:			53:50

=== Other featured songs ===
Songs featured in the film that weren't included on the soundtrack include:

- KC and the Sunshine Band - "Boogie Shoes"
- Good Charlotte - "The Anthem"
- Poison - "Every Rose Has Its Thorn"
- The Trammps - "Disco Inferno"
- Jean Knight - "Mr. Big Stuff" (cover by Nikki & Rich)
- Hole - "Celebrity Skin"
- Stevie Wonder - "Higher Ground" (performed by The Blind Boys of Alabama)
- The Coasters - "Hongry"
- Cee Money, Dee Fresh - "Them Girlz"
- Alfred Bryan, Fred Fisher - "Peg o' My Heart"
- Taio Cruz - "Dynamite"
- Steve Nelson, Jack Collins - "Peter Cottontail" (performed by Hank Azaria)
- Yolanda Be Cool, DCUP - "We No Speak Americano"
- Rae - "305"
- Cody Simpson - "I Want Candy"

== Personnel ==
- Music composer and conductor: Christopher Lennertz
- Supervising music editor: J.J. George
- Music editor: Bryon Rickerson
- Additional music editors: Terry Wilson and Kevin Crehan
- Music contractor: David Low
- Music preparation: Steve Juliani Music Preparation
- Scoring coordinator: Anne Roever
- Music coordinator: Jessica Neilson
- Orchestrators: Andrew Kinney, Robert Elhai, Dana Niu, Emilie Bernstein, Wataru Hokoyama, Christopher Lennertz, Larry Rench, Gernot Wolfgang, and Rossano Galante
- Programming and arrangements: Michael Barry, Michael Patti, and Todd Haberman
- Additional music and arrangements: Philip White
- Score recorder and mixer: Jeff Vaughn
- Digital recordist: Kevin Globerman
- Score performed by: Hollywood Studio Symphony
- Score recorded at: Eastwood Scoring Stage, Warner Bros. Studios Burbank
- Eastwood Scoring Stage scoring crew: Greg Hays, Rich Wheeler, Jay Silvester, Ryan Robinson, and Jamie Olvera
- Score mixed at: Record One Recording Studio
- Second mix engineer: Patrick Spain
- Voice contractor: Joan Beal
- Choir conductor: Philip White
- E.B.'s drumming performer: Zach Danziger
- Featured musicians: Mark Robertson, Jim Cox, Mike Valerio, and George Doering
- Additional music production: Ali Dee Theodore for DeeTown Entertainment

== Accolades ==
On May 19, 2011, Lennertz received a BMI Film & TV Award for his score.
