= First Book =

Educational nonprofit organization

- Formation: 1992
- Founder: Kyle Zimmer; Peter Gold; Elizabeth Arky
- Location(s): Washington, D.C., United States and Toronto, Ontario, Canada
- Website: firstbook.org

First Book is a nonprofit organization established in 1992 that aims to provide educational resources to children from low-income communities. The organization works to eliminate barriers to education by distributing books and other learning materials to educators and programs serving underserved populations.

== History ==
First Book was founded in 1992 by Kyle Zimmer, Peter Gold, and Elizabeth Arky in Washington, D.C. Zimmer, serve as the organization's President and CEO.

== See also ==
- Education in the United States
- Nonprofit organization
