= Bryan Todd (music producer) =

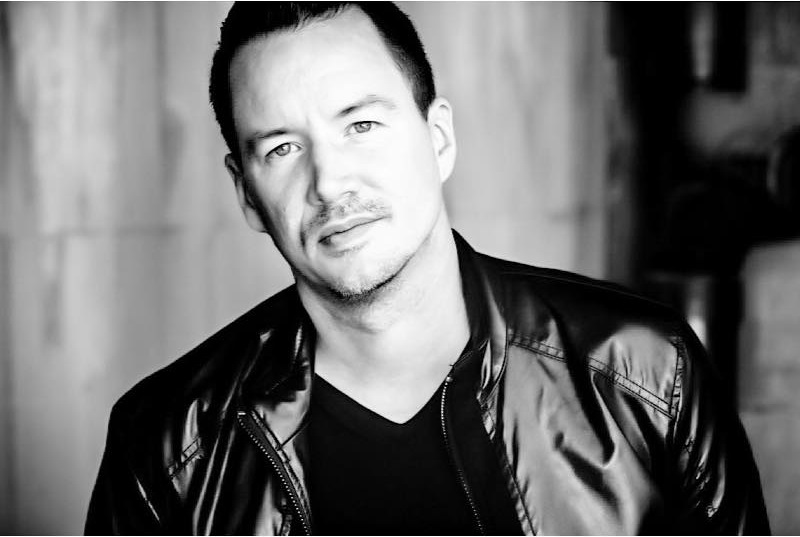
- Record producer Bryan Todd.

Background information
- Born: March 1, 1973 (age 53)
- Origin: Cincinnati, Ohio, U.S.
- Genres: Pop, R&B, Country
- Occupations: Songwriter, producer, musician, artist
- Instruments: Vocals, piano, keyboards
- Years active: 2002-present
- Website: bryantodd.com

Bryan Todd (born March 1, 1973) is an American multi-platinum record producer and songwriter. Early in his career, Todd was a solo artist and had a single in the top 20. He has since focused on writing and producing for other artists such as Miley Cyrus, Big Time Rush, Jordin Sparks, Danny Gokey, Michael W. Smith, Rascal Flatts, Kelly Clarkson, Ashley Tisdale and notably the song "Breakthrough" for the Disney film, Lemonade Mouth, a soundtrack that reached No. 1 on Billboard. His newest producer project is gaining fast notoriety. The first single “Real” features American songstress Jaden Michaels, who is the sister of Pop singer songwriter Julia Michaels.

== Early life and education ==
Todd is the son of a minister and was born in Cincinnati, Ohio. After high school he joined the Navy ROTC through Temple University in Philadelphia, Pennsylvania.

== Career ==
Todd began his career as a recording artist in Los Angeles. He traveled to Sweden at the suggestion of colleagues and signed with Warner/Chappell Music. He released a single It's The Way which peaked at #19 on the Dance/Mix Show Airplay chart in October 2004. Todd also began penning tracks for other artists.

Todd has since written and produced for numerous artists that have included Jordin Sparks, Kelly Clarkson, Michael W. Smith, Rascal Flatts, Lucy Hale, Ashley Tisdale, Josh Kelley, Berlin, Jordan Pruitt, Big Time Rush, Honor Society and Ashley Roberts from the Pussycat Dolls. He wrote and produced "Breakthrough" for the Disney film, Lemonade Mouth. This soundtrack went to No. 1 on the Billboard Soundtrack Chart and was also the highest soundtrack debut on the Billboard Hot 100. He also co-wrote and produced "I'm Still Alive," a song written for Slovak sister duo TWiiNS. In addition, Todd had a #1 record with Honor Society in late 2011 with the song he co-wrote and produced "Hurricane."

Todd has co-created and developed an act with record executive Tommy Page for Warner Bros. Records called V Factory. He acted as the group's executive producer, as well as writing and producing about half of the group's debut. In addition, Nickelodeon and Sony Music asked Todd to be a music consultant and producer for boy band Big Time Rush. His notable collaborators include Kara Dioguardi of American Idol fame, Jimmy Robbins, Jeffrey Steele, Andreas Carlsson, Kristian Lundin, and Stephan Moccio. Todd was also signed to Universal Music Publishing through David Foster.

== Discography ==
=== Production and songwriting ===
- Timmy Trumpet feat. Thomas Edwards - “Live Before I Die"
- Bryan Todd x Nick Howard - “Fell Into You"
- Bryan Todd x Jason Walker - “Wait"
- Jana Kramer feat. Gretchen Rossi – "Nothing Without You"
- Michael W. Smith – "Your Love Is A Flood"
- Kennedy Bane - “Miss Me EP"
- Bryan Todd x Kennedy Bane - “One Of Us" (Performed Live on ZDF-Fernsehgarten)
- Bryan Todd x Kennedy Bane - “Ghost"
- Laine Hardy - “Dancing On The Moon”
- Bryan Todd x Thomas Will x James Maslow - “Crazy Talk"
- Big Time Rush - “Only One”
- Charles Esten - “Back In My Life Again”
- On The Outside - "Go Broke” (Bryan Todd Remix)
- Big Time Rush - “Weekends”
- Big Time Rush - “Ask You Tonight”
- Big Time Rush - “Dreamworld”
- Bryan Todd x Abi x Sidney Housen - “Lose My Number"
- Jana Kramer - “What If Kindness Was The Currency”
- Trey Simon – "Crosses"
- Bryan Todd - “Million Reasons” Ft. Alex Harry
- Emily Brooke – "Enough"
- Jaden Michaels - “Wrong”
- Bryan Todd – "Real” Ft. Jaden Michaels
- 5WEST – "Anything Can Happen” - Benny Benassi
- 5WEST – "Last Time”
- Michael W. Smith – "Conversation"
- Hurricane – "Want Ya”
- Hurricane – "Roll The Dice”
- 5WEST – "One Shot”
- 5WEST – "Collide”
- Lee Brice – "Rumor” (Bryan Todd Remix)
- Keelie Walker – "Focus”
- Keelie Walker – "Not You”
- Jamala – "SOLO"
- Keelie Walker – "This Is What It's Like"
- Keelie Walker – "Hit Me Up"
- Kelly Clarkson – "2018 RDMA Medley"
- Michael W. Smith – "Something In My Heart"
- Michael W. Smith – "Footsteps"
- Michael W. Smith – "Louder"
- Michael W. Smith – "Revolution"
- Michael W. Smith – "Hey Love" feat. Jordin Sparks
- Michael W. Smith – "You Me Feel This Way"
- Michael W. Smith – "Forgive"
- Azure - “Too Late”
- FJØRA – "Wild Animals"
- Danny Gokey – "Stronger Than We Think"
- Danny Gokey – "Slow Down"
- Alexa Aronson feat. Snoop Dogg – "Music Feels Better"
- Rita Wilson – "What You See Is What You Get"
- Rascal Flatts & Lucy Hale – "Let It Go" We Love Disney (2015 compilation album)
- Christian Bautista & Jessica Sanchez – "Two Forevers"
- BC Jean aka Alexander Jean – "Roses and Violets"
- AJ Lehrman – "Unbelievable" UK Release
- JAGMAC – "Existence" (Radio Remix by Wideboys)
- Ruben Studdard – "If This World Were Mine"
- Berlin – "It's The Way"
- Lemonade Mouth Puckers Up – "Don't Stop The Revolution" Featuring Adam Hicks, Chris Brochu, Hayley Kiyoko & Naomi Scott
- Lemonade Mouth – (Disney Original Movie) – "Breakthrough"
- Honor Society – "Hurricane"
- TWiiNS – "I'm Still Alive" – Eurovision Song Contest 2011 Slovakia
- TWiiNS – "Compromise"
- Sophia Black – "What Can You Take From Me"
- Gretchen Rossi – "Revelation"
- Tay Barton – "Live U, Love U, Breathe U"
- Tay Barton – "I'm Invisible"
- Mitchel Musso – "Empty"
- Miley Cyrus – "Welcome To Hollywood"
- Big Time Rush – "One More Moment"
- Alyson Stoner – "What I've Been Looking For"
- Starstruck (2010 film) – "Welcome To Hollywood"
- Action Item – "Satellite"
- Action Item – "Without You"
- The Princess And The Frog – "Live To See You Smile"
- The Princess And The Frog – "Do What I Want To Do"
- Jordin Sparks – Road To Paradise
- Mitchel Musso – "Welcome To Hollywood"
- Jordan Pruitt – "Take To The Sky"
- Jimmy Robbins – "Everything To You"
- V Factory – "Round and Round"
- V Factory – "These Are The Days"
- V Factory – "Beautiful Girl"
- Mitchel Musso, Emily Osment – "If I Didn't Have You"
- Jo De La Rosa – Unscripted (album)
- Ashley Tisdale – "Over It"
- Ashley Tisdale -"I Will Be Me"
- Ashley Tisdale -"Who I Am"
- Ashley Tisdale -"It's The Way" (unreleased)
- Josh Kelley – "Unfair"
- Christy Carlson Romano – "Best Time Of The Year"
- Everlife – "I Could Get Used To This"
- Everlife – "Static"
- Ho Yeow Sun – "Mine"
- Bryan Todd – "Wherever You Are"
- Bryan Todd – "It's The Way"
- Bryan Todd – "Remember, Get Ya, Feel Ya"
- Shinhwa – "Fly High"
