= Lemonade Mouth (soundtrack) =

Soundtrack album by Bridgit Mendler and various artists
- Released: April 12, 2011
- Recorded: 2010–2011
- Genres: Pop; synth-pop; rock
- Length: 40:32
- Label: Walt Disney

Singles from Lemonade Mouth
- 1. "Somebody" Released: March 4, 2011; 2. "Determinate" Released: April 15, 2011; 3. "Breakthrough" Released: May 2, 2011

Christopher Lennertz chronology
Hop (2011)	Lemonade Mouth (2011)	Horrible Bosses (2011)

Lemonade Mouth is a soundtrack album by Bridgit Mendler and other members of cast of the film Lemonade Mouth, released on April 12, 2011, by Walt Disney Records. The soundtrack peaked at number 4 on the US Billboard 200, number three on the US Top Digital Albums and topped the US Top Soundtracks and US Kid Albums. Elsewhere, it peaked at number 71 in Australia, number 38 in Austria, number 25 in Belgium (Flanders), number 100 in Belgium (Wallonia), number 79 in Netherlands, number 26 in Poland and at number 38 in Spain. In the 2011 year-end charts, the soundtrack ranked at number 87 on the US Billboard 200, number 7 on the US Top Soundtracks and managed to make it into the top 3 of the US Kid Albums. The singles "Somebody", "Determinate" and "Breakthrough" peaked at number 89, 51 and 88 on the US Billboard Hot 100, respectively. As of September 2012, the soundtrack had sold 402,000 copies.

In 2024, Urban Outfitters released an exclusive vinyl with the soundtrack, on a lemonade-coloured vinyl.

== Album history ==
The Lemonade Mouth pop rock album includes ten original songs by songwriters Aris Archontis, Maria Christensen, Ali Dee, Andy Dodd, Tom Leonard, Jeannie Lurie, Niclas Molinder, Chen Neeman, Joacim Persson, Lindy Robbins, Shridhar Solanki, Shane Stevens, Matthew Tishler, Bryan Todd, Reed Vertelney, Adam Watts, and Adam Hicks. The soundtrack was released by Walt Disney Records on April 12, 2011.

== Singles ==
"Somebody", performed by Bridgit Mendler, was released as first single on March 4, 2011. It has debuted and peaked at number 89 on the US Billboard Hot 100 and peaked at number 12 on the US Billboard Top Heatseekers chart. The music video was released on March 18, 2011. The song has sold 6,000 copies in the first week in the United States according to Nielsen SoundScan.

"Determinate" was the second single. The song is performed by Mendler featured the Adam Hicks's vocals. It was released on April 15, 2011. The song proved the most successful out of the three singles, peaking at number 51 on the US Billboard Hot 100, at number 28 on the US Hot Digital Songs, topped the US Billboard Top Heatseekers chart and charting in 2 more countries. The music video was released on the same day the song was released and is a scene of the film.

"Breakthrough", performed by the cast of the film, was the third and final single. It was released on May 2, 2011. The song debuted and peaked at number 88 on the US Billboard Hot 100 and peaked at number 89 on the US Billboard Top Heatseekers chart. The music video is another scene of the film.

Other charted songs

"Turn Up the Music", performed by Bridgit Mendler, did not enter the Billboard Hot 100, but peaked at number 12 on the Bubbling Under Hot 100 Singles.

"She's So Gone", performed by Naomi Scott, also peaked on the Bubbling Under Hot 100 Singles at number 3.

== Critical reception ==
Professional ratings
Review scores
Source	Rating
AllMusic	3/5 stars

Christopher Monger of AllMusic gave a review of the Lemonade Mouth soundtrack: "Lemonade Mouth (the band) tackle the usual teen subjects (self-esteem, standing by your friends in the face of adversity, following your dreams, being silly) and successfully blend the dewy-eyed romanticism of the Jonas Brothers and the quasi-rebellious angst of early Avril Lavigne, resulting in a winning, if not entirely original, collection of new High School Musical-inspired homeroom anthems."

"She's So Gone" is featured on Billboard's list of "The 100 Greatest Disney Songs of All Time" and Rolling Stone's "Fake Bands, Real Songs: The 50 Best Tunes by Made-Up Musicians".

== Commercial performance ==
The soundtrack debuted at number 18 on the US Billboard 200. Due to strong sales, the soundtrack moved up thirteen places to reach the top five spot. Then the soundtrack finally peaked at number 4. It has also peaked at number three on the US Top Digital Albums and has topped the US Top Soundtracks and US Kid Albums. Elsewhere, it has peaked at number 71 on the Australian Albums Chart, number 38 on the Austrian Albums Chart, number 25 on the Belgian Albums Chart (Flanders), number 100 on the Belgian Albums Chart (Wallonia), number 79 on the Netherlands Albums Chart, number 26 on the Polish Albums Chart and at number 38 on the Spanish Albums Chart. As of September 2012, the soundtrack has sold 402,000 copies.

== Track listing ==
Lemonade Mouth track listing
No.	Title	Writer(s)	Performer(s)	Length
1.	"Turn Up the Music"	Adam Watts; Andy Dodd	Bridgit Mendler; Adam Hicks; Naomi Scott; Hayley Kiyoko; Blake Michael	2:56
2.	"Somebody"	Lindy Robbins; Reed Vertelney	Bridgit Mendler	3:28
3.	"And the Crowd Goes"	Jeannie Lurie; Aris Archontis; Chen Neeman	Chris Brochu	2:47
4.	"Determinate"	Niclas Molinder; Joacim Persson; Johan Alkenäs; Charlie Mason; Ebony Burks; Hicks	Bridgit Mendler; Adam Hicks	3:18
5.	"Here We Go"	Ali Dee; Vincent Alfieri; Zach Danziger	Bridgit Mendler; Adam Hicks; Hayley Kiyoko	2:52
6.	"She's So Gone"	Matthew Tishler; Shane Stevens; Christensen	Naomi Scott	3:06
7.	"More than a Band"	Lurie; Archontis; Neeman	Bridgit Mendler; Adam Hicks; Naomi Scott; Hayley Kiyoko; Blake Michael	2:40
8.	"Don't Ya Wish U Were Us?"	Tom Leonard; Robbins; Vertelney	Chris Brochu	3:19
9.	"Breakthrough"	Bryan Todd; Maria Christensen; Shridhar Solanki; Hicks	Bridgit Mendler; Adam Hicks; Naomi Scott; Hayley Kiyoko	3:27
10.	"Livin' on a High Wire" (bonus track)	Windy Wagner; Ken Stacey; David Walsh; Joleen Belle; Hicks	Bridgit Mendler; Adam Hicks; Naomi Scott	2:38
Total length:				30:32

Spanish limited edition bonus track
No.	Title	Writer(s)	Performer(s)	Length
11.	"Determinate" (Almighty Club Mix with Rap)	Niclas Molinder; Joacim Persson; Johan Alkenäs; Charlie Mason; Ebony Burks; Hicks	Bridgit Mendler; Adam Hicks	7:23

International iTunes Store special edition bonus tracks
No.	Title	Writer(s)	Performer(s)	Length
12.	"Determinate" (Almighty Mix Show)	Niclas Molinder; Joacim Persson; Johan Alkenäs; Charlie Mason; Ebony Burks; Hicks	Bridgit Mendler; Adam Hicks	5:01
13.	"Determinate" (Almighty Mix Radio Edit)	Niclas Molinder; Joacim Persson; Johan Alkenäs; Charlie Mason; Ebony Burks; Hicks	Bridgit Mendler; Adam Hicks	3:49

== Charts and sales ==
=== Weekly charts ===
Weekly chart performance for Lemonade Mouth
Chart (2011)	Peak position
Australian Albums Chart	71
Australian Digital Albums Chart	15
Austrian Albums Chart	38
Belgian Albums Chart (Flanders)	25
Belgian Albums Chart (Wallonia)	100
Netherlands Albums Chart	79
Polish Albums Chart	26
Spanish Albums Chart	38
UK Albums Chart	173
US Billboard 200	4
US Kid Albums	1
US Top Soundtracks	1
US Top Digital Albums	3

=== Year-end charts ===
2011 year-end chart performance for Lemonade Mouth
Chart (2011)	Position
US Billboard 200	87
US Kid Albums	3
US Top Soundtracks	7

2012 year-end chart performance for Lemonade Mouth
Chart (2012)	Position
US Kid Albums	23

=== Sales ===
Sales for Lemonade Mouth
Country	Provider	Sales
United States	RIAA	402,000
