= Lemonade Mouth (film) =

2011 film by Patricia Riggen

- Extended edition US DVD cover
- Genre: Musical comedy drama
- Based on: Lemonade Mouth by Mark Peter Hughes
- Teleplay by: April Blair
- Directed by: Patricia Riggen
- Starring: Bridgit Mendler; Adam Hicks; Hayley Kiyoko; Naomi Scott; Blake Michael
- Music by: Christopher Lennertz
- Country of origin: United States
- Original language: English

Production
- Executive producer: Debra Martin Chase
- Producer: Matias Alvarez
- Cinematography: Checco Varese
- Editor: Girish Bhargava
- Running time: 106 minutes
- Production companies: Martin Chase Productions; GWave Productions; American Greetings Productions

Original release
- Network: Disney Channel
- Release: April 15, 2011

Lemonade Mouth is a 2011 American musical comedy drama television film produced by and aired on Disney Channel as one of the network's original films (DCOM). Based on Mark Peter Hughes's 2007 novel of the same name, the film was directed by Patricia Riggen and written by April Blair. It stars Bridgit Mendler, Adam Hicks, Naomi Scott, Hayley Kiyoko and Blake Michael as five high school students who meet in detention and form a band to stand up for their values and to overcome their individual and collective struggles.

Lemonade Mouth became the third most-watched DCOM premiere of its year with 5.7 million views, and DVR viewing raised the number to 7.1 million. The film earned a Popstar! Poptastic Award and nominations at the Directors Guild of America and Golden Reel Awards. Its soundtrack reached number four on the Billboard 200 and produced the Billboard Hot 100 singles "Somebody", "Determinate" and "Breakthrough".

Lemonade Mouth received positive reviews from critics and audiences, with praise for its direction, performances and themes. In the years following its release, it has been considered one of the best DCOM films.

== Plot ==
High school freshmen Olivia White, Mohini "Mo" Banjaree, Charles "Charlie" Delgado, Stella Yamada, and Wendell "Wen" Gifford meet while in detention. When Miss Reznick, the music teacher supervising detention, leaves briefly, they tap out a beat and play instruments, with Olivia singing along. Miss Reznick returns and encourages them to enter the upcoming Rising Star music competition which the winner will get a record deal, which popular band Mudslide Crush is also slated to perform in.

Stella enters them all in Rising Star as well as the upcoming Halloween Bash. The five agree to form a band with Olivia on lead vocals, Stella on lead guitar and backing vocals, Mo on bass and backing vocals, Wen on keyboards, keytar, and rapping vocals, and Charlie on drums. At school, Stella spits lemonade on Ray Beech, the lead singer of Mudslide Crush, when he ridicules Olivia's stage fright. He refers to her as "Lemonade Mouth", giving the band its name. The band later discovers the school's lemonade machine is being removed, to their chagrin.

Mo breaks up with her boyfriend Scott Pickett, Mudslide Crush's guitarist, after she catches him flirting with a cheerleader. Prior to performing at the Halloween Bash, Olivia suffers a panic attack. Encouraged by her bandmates, Olivia performs with the band. Onstage, Stella objects to the removal of the lemonade machine and encourages her fellow students to freely express themselves. The principal, Stan Brenigan, angrily bans them from playing at school again, claiming their performance was a "political tirade." The next day, banners in support of Lemonade Mouth are posted around the school, raising their spirits. The band gets to perform in a pizza restaurant as a paying gig, away from Brenigan in a venue that he has no control of.

When Olivia is absent from school one day, the band visits her and learn that her cat, her only remaining memory of her late mother, has died, and that her father is in prison, leaving her in a depressed state. They open up to one another about each of their respective struggles, and discover that their song "Determinate" is being played on the local radio. Shortly after, Mo contracts the flu, Charlie breaks his fingers, Wen sustains a black eye, and Olivia loses her voice during an argument with Wen.

At Stella's behest, her bandmates reluctantly convene at the school to protest the removal of the lemonade machine. After being detained by police and contemplating the future of the band, they agree to perform at Rising Star. As each of their parents and guardians come to retrieve them from the police station, they reconcile their individual problems at home; Wen finally accepts his dad's girlfriend, Olivia gains the courage to send a letter to her incarcerated father, Mo gets her dad to accept her for who she is, Charlie realizes he doesn't have to live up to his older brother's prowess, and Stella realizes she doesn't have to be a genius to fit in with her family.

While performing at Rising Star, Olivia and Mo's respective ailments begin to resurface in the middle of their performance. Dejected, the band is about to exit the stage when the audience begins to sing their song to support them. Scott, fed up with Ray's hostile treatment towards Lemonade Mouth, leaves Mudslide Crush and plays his guitar alongside Lemonade Mouth, while the crowd sings along and applauds.

Mo and Scott later get back together. Charlie, who developed a crush on Mo while forming the band, takes an interest in a new girl. Wen attends his father's wedding as the best man. Stella meets Mel, the original owner of the lemonade machine, who helps donate a new music auditorium to the band's school with Principal Brenigan's approval. Olivia regains her voice, with Wen apologizing to her and gifting her a new kitten. Later, Olivia mails the entire story of the band's genesis to her father, wrapping up with news of Lemonade Mouth performing at Madison Square Garden, with Scott as their new rhythm guitarist.

In a post-credits scene (exclusive to the DVD edition), Lemonade Mouth is invited to an interview. On air, the interviewer asks about Mo and Scott's relationship, raising suspicion from her father, until Olivia interrupts to reveal that she and Wen are dating. After the interview, they perform "Livin' on a High Wire", with Mo's father and the audience enjoying the performance.

== Cast ==
- Bridgit Mendler as Olivia White
- Adam Hicks as Wendell "Wen" Gifford
- Hayley Kiyoko as Stella Yamada
- Naomi Scott as Mohini "Mo" Banjaree
- Blake Michael as Charles "Charlie" Delgado
- Nick Roux as Scott Pickett
- Chris Brochu as Ray Beech
- Tisha Campbell as Miss Jenny Reznick
- Christopher McDonald as Principal Stanley Brenigan
- Scott Takeda as Stella's Father
- Ariana Smythe as Sydney
- Judith Rane as Brenda
- Isaac Kappy as Mel
- Ryan Montano as Tommy Delgado
- Lauren Poole as Moxie Morris
- Bob Jesser as Mr. Gifford
- Leedy Corbin as Georgie Gifford
- Lance Capaldi as Ticket Taker
- Shishir Kurup as Mr. Banjaree
- Thomas Sanchez as Cop
- Johnie Hector as Coach
- Paul Clark as Andrew
- Caitlin Ribbans as Jules
- Phil Luna as Charlie's Dad
- Chiara Brokaw as Alex
- Lora Martinez-Cunningham as Charlie's Mom
- Jayna Sweet as Victoria
- Nicholas Martinez as Freshman Singer
- Tom Romero as Mr. Prichard

Author Mark Peter Hughes makes a cameo appearance as an extra dressed as a bee at the Halloween Bash.

== Production ==
In May 2010, Lemonade Mouth was announced by Disney Channel initially as an upcoming musical franchise. Bridgit Mendler, Adam Hicks, Naomi Scott, Hayley Kiyoko, Blake Michael, Nick Roux, Chris Brochu, Tisha Campbell-Martin and Christopher McDonald were announced as the principal cast of the film. Production began in August 2010, and filming took place in Albuquerque, New Mexico. The film was Scott's first American production, who in an episode of Collider's Ladies Night podcast said that "I [also] remember being introduced to craft services for the first time. And for me, it's this US production and I was like, oh my gosh, they have a trolley of candy that just came around! And to me I just thought, I've made it. This is what I've wanted. This is what it's all about. It's all about candy on a trolley."

The names of five characters in the book were changed for the film; the character of "Olivia Whitehead" was shortened to "Olivia White", "Wendel Gifford" was changed to "Wendell Gifford", "Stella Penn" was changed to "Stella Yamada", "Mohini Banerjee" was changed to "Mohini Banjaree", and "Charlie Hirsh" was changed to "Charlie Delgado".

Mendler was once open to the idea of Lemonade Mouth becoming a real band. In an interview with Christopher John Farley of The Wall Street Journal, she said that singing with the cast was "really fun, it's possible, we can do it. At this point in time because we haven't had any time to practice it, I'd say we'd need some backup assistance, but down the road it's something we'd be able to do on our own."

== Soundtrack ==
Lemonade Mouth features ten original songs, and was released by Walt Disney Records as a soundtrack album on April 12, 2011. It peaked at number four on the US Billboard 200, number three on the US Top Digital Albums, and topped the US Top Soundtracks and US Kid Albums. In September 2012, the album was reported to have sold 402,000 copies. The tracks "Breakthrough", "Determinate" and "Somebody" were released as singles, all of which appeared on the Billboard Hot 100.

== Critical reception ==
Lemonade Mouth was watched by 5.7 million viewers on its premiere night, ranking as the No. 1 TV Telecast among Kids 7–11 (2.3 million/9.4 rating) and Teens (2.1 million/8.5 rating), and cable's No. 1 original movie of 2011 among Total Viewers. With DVR viewing included, its total was 7.1 million viewers. On the review aggregator website Rotten Tomatoes, 80% of critics' reviews are positive. Common Sense Media highlighted the film's positive messages about friendship, individuality, and self-expression, particularly its emphasis on young people finding their voices through music. Lemonade Mouth has often been considered one of the best Disney Channel original films, appearing high on several media lists ranking DCOMs.

Alan Ng of the online publication Film Threat opined that the "protest music" and narratives gave the film an edge, but believed that it ultimately "played it safe in the end." H.F. Chacon Jr. of The Tartan gave the film seven out of ten stars, writing that "the plot is not as sappy and childish as DCOMs are often thought to be, and can be respected for attempting to speak on the topics that children maturing into young adults have to deal with." Khalid McCalla of The Oberlin Review lauded the cast, describing Mendler and Hicks as "likeable and amazing" and Michael, Scott and Kiyoko as "equally amazing. These five leads are expertly cast and do a phenomenal job taking their characters from a group of misfits and loners to a Madison Square Garden-booking band."

The soundtrack of the film was received positively by critics. Christopher Monger of AllMusic praised the film for tackling "the usual teen subjects" through its music and called it a blend of "the dewy-eyed romanticism of the Jonas Brothers and the quasi-rebellious angst of early Avril Lavigne, resulting in a winning, if not entirely original, collection of new High School Musical-inspired homeroom anthems." McCalla called the music "magnificent" and singled out the songs "She's So Gone" and "Determinate" for praise, writing that "Scott absolutely crushes it. … Hicks is a better rapper than your favorite rapper. Argue with yourself." "She's So Gone" was featured on Billboard's list of "The 100 Greatest Disney Songs of All Time" and Rolling Stone's "Fake Bands, Real Songs: The 50 Best Tunes by Made-Up Musicians".

== Cancelled sequel ==
In 2011, the author of Lemonade Mouth said that he had been working on a sequel. Actor Blake Michael said: "It's all up to the fans, it's in their hands. If people enjoy it and they love it and they want more, they'll get it. I think Disney is just a great organization in general and they're always one step ahead of the game. So you never really know what's gonna happen." On June 15, 2011, it was announced during the 2011 Licensing International Expo that Lemonade Mouth 2 was in the works.

On April 6, 2012, Brochu announced on his Twitter account that the sequel was no longer going into production. In interviews with Kidzworld Media and BSCKids in May 2012, Mendler confirmed that a sequel would not be produced, noting that "they tried to figure something out for a sequel, but everyone at Disney felt like the movie had completed its story in the first movie."

== Awards and nominations ==
Award	Year	Category	Recipient(s)	Result	Ref.
Popstar! Poptastic Awards	2011	Favorite TV Movie	Lemonade Mouth	Won	
JaNEWary Awards	2011	Best iTunes Song	"Determinate"	Won	
Directors Guild of America Awards	2012	Outstanding Directorial Achievement in Children's Programs	Patricia Riggen	Nominated	
Golden Reel Awards	2013	Best Sound Editing - Long Form Musical in Television	Amber Funk	Nominated	

== See also ==
- List of Disney Channel original films
