= Adam Hicks =

American actor (born 1992)

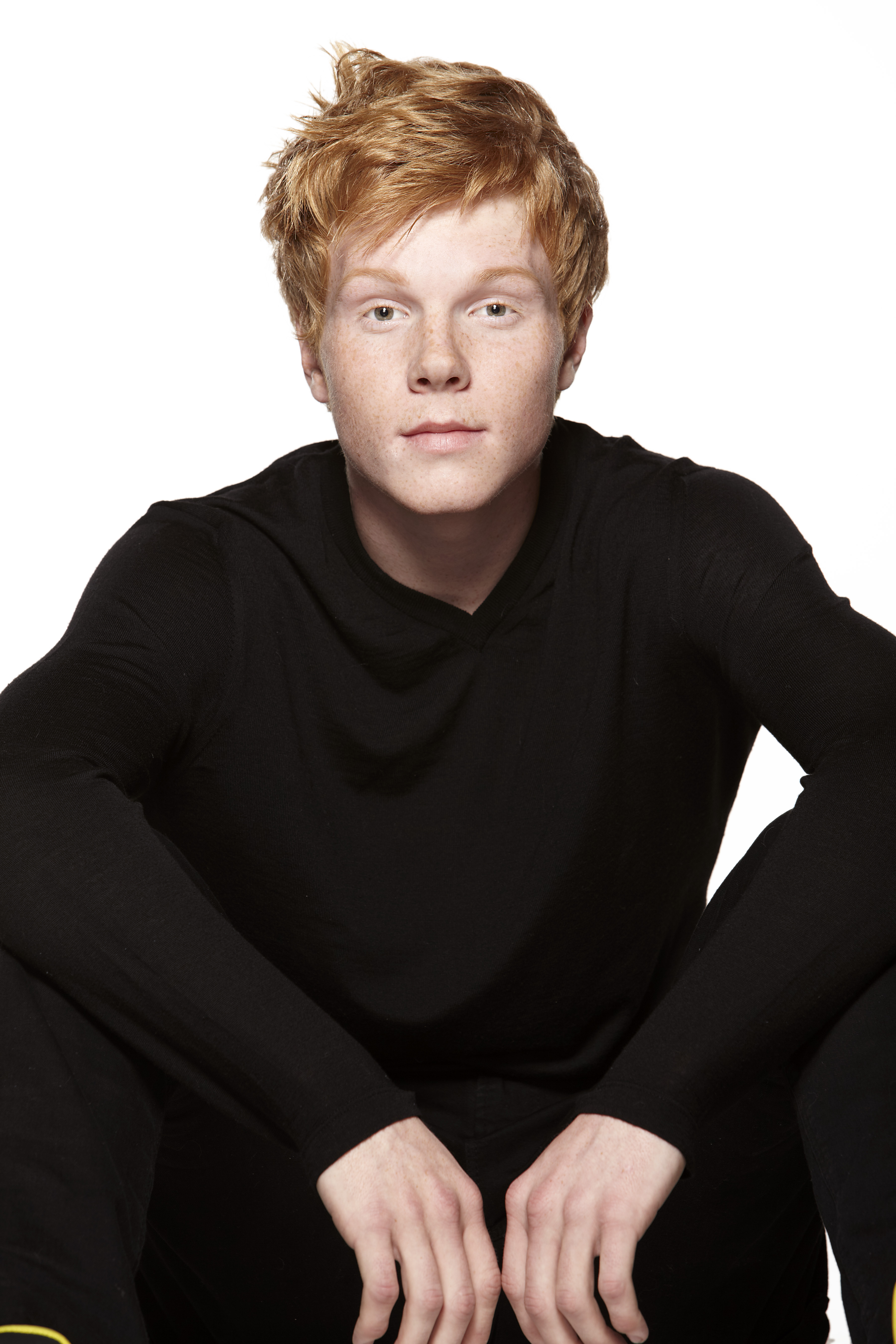
- Hicks in 2011
- Born: Adam Paul Nielson Hicks; November 28, 1992 (age 33); Las Vegas, Nevada, U.S.
- Occupations: Actor; rapper
- Years active: 1999–present

Adam Paul Nielson Hicks (born November 28, 1992) is an American actor, musician and rapper. His first leading role was in How to Eat Fried Worms. He was also known for playing Luther in the Disney XD series Zeke and Luther and Wendell "Wen" Gifford in the film Lemonade Mouth. He had a recurring role in the second season of Jonas as DZ, and a co-lead role as Boz in Season 3 of Pair of Kings.

== Career ==
=== Acting ===
Hicks was born in Las Vegas, Nevada. He had a recurring role in Titus, and had roles in various movies and television series, before playing the lead in How to Eat Fried Worms. He then appeared in Mostly Ghostly alongside many other Disney Channel stars. In 2009, he grabbed the co lead role of Luther on Zeke and Luther. In April 2011, he starred in Lemonade Mouth as Wendell "Wen" Gifford.

He co starred on Pair of Kings as King Boz, replacing Mitchel Musso's character King Brady. Hicks portrayed Jason Zimmer, in the erotic thriller The Boy Next Door. Hicks returned to acting in 2025, playing Adam Stone in Stone Creek Killer.

=== Music ===
Hicks recorded a remake of the MC Hammer song "U Can't Touch This" with fellow Zeke and Luther costar Daniel Curtis Lee. The music video for the song was shown June 29, 2009, on Disney XD. He made a remix of the song "In the Summertime" by Mungo Jerry. In the end of 2010, he wrote and recorded the song "Happy Universal Holidays" with Ryan Newman.

At the beginning of 2011, he released a song called "Dance For Life", with Drew Seeley for the Disney Channel Original Series Shake It Up, which was featured on Shake It Up: Break It Down.

Hicks co-wrote the tracks "Determinate", "Breakthrough" and "Livin' On a High Wire" for Lemonade Mouth. He also has a music video featuring Chris Brochu for his single "We Burnin' Up". In most of his songs, Hicks introduces himself as A Plus. In October 2012, he recorded a song for the new book Lemonade Mouth Puckers Up entitled "Don't Stop The Revolution". Hicks sang the theme song for the Disney XD show Mighty Med, titled "You Never Know". On October 28, 2022, Hicks released the song "Chosen One", and he has continued to release music since. Other singles include "Famous", "Nothing To Prove", "I Don't Need'Em", and "Feelin' Like This".

== Legal issues ==
On January 25, 2018, Hicks was arrested in Burbank, California, along with his reported girlfriend, actress Danni Tamburro, on suspicion of armed robbery. He went through a mental health evaluation to determine whether he was competent enough to stand trial for the charges. Hicks's arraignment was originally scheduled for March 23, 2019, when his attorney notified the judge his client was "not currently in a state where he can assist in his defense". The arraignment and subsequent trial were put off and Hicks was sent for further medical examination. On July 10, 2019, he pleaded not guilty to one count of second-degree robbery and one count attempted second-degree robbery. However, on another count of robbery he pleaded no contest. The first two charges were dismissed.

In July 2021, Hicks was found guilty of robbery and was sentenced to serve five years in state prison, while Tamburro was given three years of probation. However, Hicks was released in March 2022 on parole after the judge credited his 1,460 days he served while awaiting sentencing.

As of December 2023, Hicks had become an advocate for men's mental health and substance abuse recovery. He has also apologized for the mistakes he made in the past.

== Filmography ==
=== Film ===
Year	Title	Role	Notes
2005	Down and Derby	Brady Davis	
2005	The 12 Dogs of Christmas	Mike Stevens	
2006	The Shaggy Dog	Quarterback	Voice
2006	How to Eat Fried Worms	Joseph "Joe" Guire	
2008	Mostly Ghostly	Colin Doyle	
2011	Lemonade Mouth	Wen	
2015	Up on the Wooftop	Toby	Voice
2015	The Boy Next Door	Jason Zimmer	
2016	Little Savages	Billy	
2017	Windsor	Clint	
2018	Shifting Gears	Jeremy Williamson	

=== Television ===
Year	Title	Role	Notes
2000–2002	Titus	Young Dave Scouvel	Recurring role
2002	The Funkhousers	Robbie Funkhouser	Television film
2002	That Was Then	Joshua Harrison	Episode: "Pilot"
2009–2012	Zeke and Luther	Luther Waffles	Lead role
2010	Jonas	Dennis "DZ" Zimmer	Recurring role (Season 2)
2011	Peter Punk	Luthisour "Luther" Waffles	Episode: "El Duelo"
2011	PrankStars	Himself	Episode: "Game Showed Up"
2011	So Random	Himself	Episode: "Bridgit Mendler"
2011–2012	The Hive	Buzzbee	Voice, English dub
2012–2013	Pair of Kings	King Boz	Lead role (Season 3)
2012	Southland	Mike	Episode: "Legacy"
2013	CSI: Crime Scene Investigation	Tyler	Episode: "Helpless"
2015	Texas Rising	Truett Fincham	Main role
2016–2017	Freakish	Diesel Turner	Main role

== Discography ==
=== Singles ===
As main artist

List of singles
Title	Year	Album
"We Burnin' Up" (featuring Chris Brochu)	2011	Non-album singles
"Feelin' That Way"	2012	Non-album singles
"One Life" (featuring Cara)	2013	Non-album singles
"Durango Knights" (featuring James Paxton)	2015	Non-album singles
"Chosen One"	2022	Non-album singles
"Famous"	2022	Non-album singles
"I Don't Need'em"	2023	Non-album singles
"Feelin' Like This"	2023	Non-album singles
"I Need You"	2023	Non-album singles

As featured artist

List of singles, with selected chart positions
Title	Year	Peak chart positions						Album
Title	Year	US	US Heat	AUS	CAN	GER	UK	Album
"Determinate" (Bridgit Mendler featuring Adam Hicks)	2011	51	1	91	82	92	111	Lemonade Mouth
"Breakthrough" (among the Cast of Lemonade Mouth)	2011	88	11	—	—	—	200	Lemonade Mouth
"Non-Stop Summer" (Cole Plante featuring Adam Hicks)	2012	—	—	—	—	—	—	Non-album singles
"You in My Life" (Nathalie Hernandez featuring Adam Hicks)	2013	—	—	—	—	—	—	Non-album singles
"Nobody Better Than You" (Nic Neufeld featuring Adam Hicks)	2014	—	—	—	—	—	—	Non-album singles
"—" denotes a title that was not released or did not chart in that territory.

=== Other appearances ===
Title	Year	Other artist(s)	Album
"Happy Universal Holidays"	2010	Ryan Newman	Disney Channel Holiday Playlist
"Dance for Life"	2011	Drew Seeley	Shake It Up: Break It Down
"Whodunit"	2012	Coco Jones	Shake It Up: Live 2 Dance

=== Music videos ===
Song	Year	Director
"U Can't Touch This"	2009	—N/a
"In the Summertime"	2010	—N/a
"Happy Universal Holidays"	2010	—N/a
"Somebody"	2011	Patricia Riggen
"Determinate"	2011	Patricia Riggen
"We Burnin' Up"	2011	—N/a
"One Life"	2013	Tim Barsten
"Chosen One"	2022	Adam Hicks
"I Need You"	2023	Benjamin Jones
