= I'm Gonna Run to You =

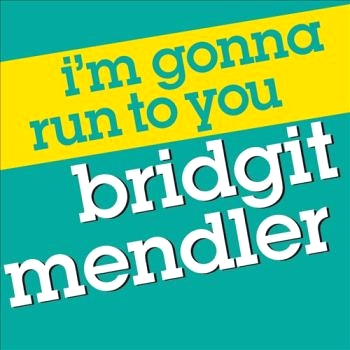

Promotional single by Bridgit Mendler
- Released: November 18, 2011
- Recorded: 2011
- Genre: Christmas; dance-pop
- Length: 3:16
- Label: Hollywood
- Songwriters: Bridgit Mendler; Jamie Houston
- Producer: Jamie Houston

"I'm Gonna Run to You" is a song by American recording artist Bridgit Mendler. It was written by Mendler and Jamie Houston and produced by Houston. The song was featured in Disney Channel's 2011 film Good Luck Charlie: It's Christmas!, but wasn't available on any album. It was released as a promotional single on November 18, 2011. The song debuted at number 13 on the Billboard Holiday Songs.

== Background, development and release ==
An uptempo song, "I'm Gonna Run to You" is composed in a style evocative of pop and Christmas music, built on a beat with multi-tracked harmonies. Its lyrics declare that the singer intends to be with their lover during Christmas, regardless of what difficulties may arise to try and prevent that. The song incorporates various instruments, including bell chimes, bass effect and cowbells. The song was written by Mendler and Jamie Houston and produced by Houston. In December 2011 during an interview for Kidz World, Mendler talked about the song: "Working on the song was so much fun. I worked with Jamie Houston and we came up with the idea of people being apart and trying to reunite. We wanted it to be sort of a holiday-related song but something you could listen to year-round hopefully. I hope people like it."

The song was released as a promotional single on November 18, 2011.

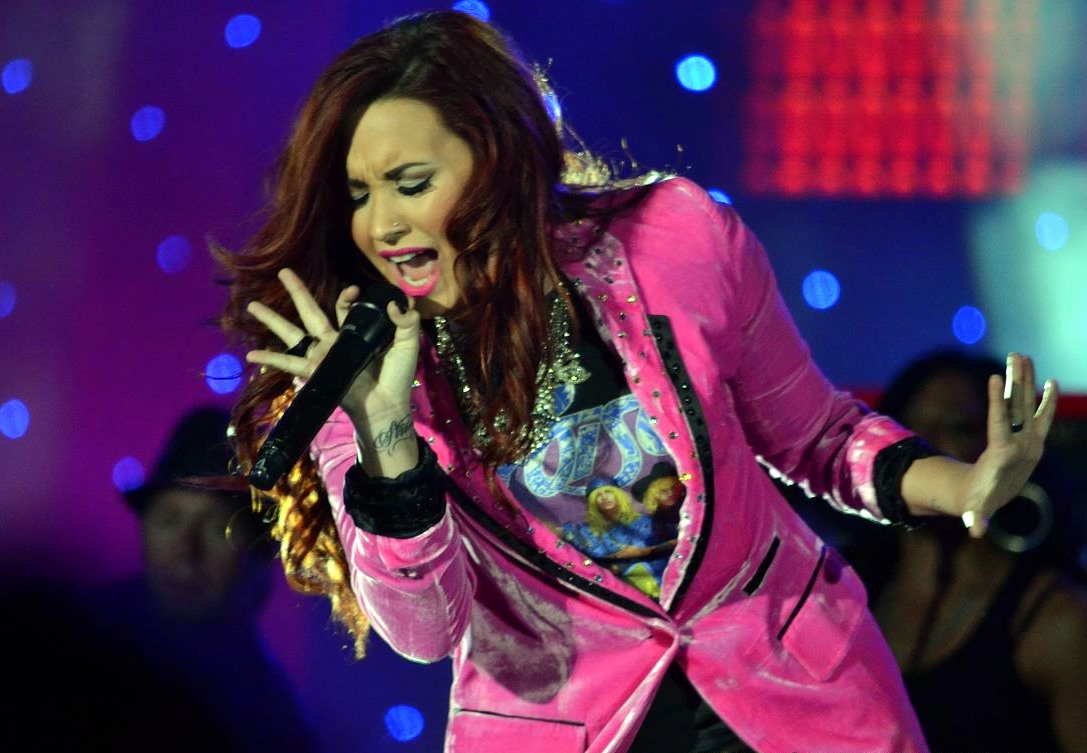
Mendler's vocals on "I'm Gonna Run to You" has been compared to Demi Lovato.

== Critical reception ==
The song has received generally positive reviews from music critics. Sarah Peel of BSC Kids said "I'm Gonna Run to You" is lovely and catchy and her voice is reminiscent of Demi Lovato. He said "I am glad to see that she is working to make sure her dreams are happening. She isn’t the typical Disney singer that we all expect. She reminds me more of an edgy Demi Lovato, which means that she is a risk taker much like Demi is. Vocally they are nothing like each other [Disney stars]. They are not doing the typical dance stuff that we typically hear from them". Disney Dreaming was positive and recommended the song overall, saying they were excited.

== Chart performance ==
For the week ending December 24, 2011 "I'm Gonna Run To You" debuted at number 13 on the Billboard Holiday Songs.

== Music video ==
The official music video for the song premiered on Disney Channel on December 2, 2011. It was directed by Arlene Sanford.

== Cover versions ==
American singer Jen Leigh, former member of the BIGLovely, released a cover of the song on February 3, 2012. The music video for this cover was released on January 1, 2012.

== Track listing ==
- US radio promotional single
1. "I'm Gonna Run to You" – 3:16

== Charts ==
| Chart (2011) | Peak position |
|---|---|
| US Holiday Songs (Billboard) | 13 |

== Release history ==
| Country | Date | Format | Label |
|---|---|---|---|
| United States | November 17, 2011 | Radio premiere | Hollywood Records |
| United Kingdom | November 18, 2011 | Digital download | Hollywood Records |
| United States | November 21, 2011 | Digital download | Hollywood Records |
| Canada | November 21, 2011 | Digital download | Hollywood Records |
