= Determinate (song) =

Single by Bridgit Mendler featuring Adam Hicks

from the album Lemonade Mouth
- Released: April 15, 2011
- Recorded: 2010
- Length: 3:18
- Label: Walt Disney
- Songwriters: Niclas Molinder; Joacim Persson; Johan Alkenäs; Charlie Mason; Ebony Burks; Adam Hicks
- Producer: Twin

Bridgit Mendler singles chronology
"Somebody" (2011)	"Determinate" (2011)	"Breakthrough" (2011)

Adam Hicks singles chronology
"In the Summertime" (2009)	"Determinate" (2011)	"Breakthrough" (2011)

"Determinate" is a song performed by American recording artist Bridgit Mendler. The song, featuring American rapper Adam Hicks, was written by Niclas Molinder, Joacim Persson, Johan Alkenäs, Charlie Mason, Ebony Burks and Hicks. Hayley Kiyoko and Naomi Scott perform occasional adlibs in the background of the song. It was produced by Twin for Lemonade Mouth in 2011, the soundtrack to the Disney Channel television movie of the same name. It was released as the album's second single on April 15, 2011, through Walt Disney Records.

== Background and composition ==
"Determinate" is the second single released from the soundtrack Lemonade Mouth for the Disney Channel television movie of the same name and is also the second single performing by Bridgit Mendler. Hayley Kiyoko and Naomi Scott also provide additional background vocals. It was produced by Twin, known for working with Ashley Tisdale, Dannii Minogue and No Angels, and written by Niclas Molinder, Joacim Persson, Johan Alkenas, Charlie Mason, Ebony Burks and Adam Hicks. Mendler's vocals span from the low note of E_{3} to the high note of B_{4}.

== Other versions ==
There is a demo version of the song performed by Ebony Burks, one of the songwriters. The demo version contains differences to Mendler's version, among them the lyrics, which has the different verses and part of the chorus changed, the instrumental has another order and does not have the rap part. This version was leaked on the internet in 2011.

There are also other versions of the song recorded by Disney with artists from each country, including "Inténtalo", the Spanish version of the song performed by the band Pop4U (from the series La Gira).

== Chart performance ==
The song proved successful out of the three singles from the soundtrack, Lemonade Mouth. It has peaked at number 51 on the US Billboard Hot 100, at number 28 on the US Hot Digital Songs chart and topped the US Top Heatseekers chart. Elsewhere, the song charted at number 82 in Canada and at number 92 in Germany.

== Music video ==
The official music video for the song premiered on Disney Channel on April 15, 2011, which is another scene of the film in which the band sings the song.

== Live performances ==
Mendler and the band performed the song on The View, Good Morning America, So Random! and UK's Daybreak. Kiyoko performed a shortened, slowed-down version of the song in the sold-out shows of her Panorama Tour in 2023.

== Track listings ==
- Digital download
1. "Determinate" – 3:18
- UK – Digital download single
1. "Determinate" – 3:18
2. "Determinate" (Almighty Club Mix) – 6:31

== Awards ==
Year	Award	Category	Nominee	Result
2011	JaNEWary Awards	Best iTunes Song	"Determinate"	Won

== Charts ==
Chart (2011)	Peak position
Australia (ARIA)	91
Australia Hitseekers (ARIA)	5
Canada (Canadian Hot 100)	82
Germany (Media Control Charts)	92
UK Singles Chart	111
US Billboard Hot 100	51
US Kid Digital Songs (Billboard)	1

== Release history ==
Country	Date	Format	Label
United States	April 15, 2011	Digital download	Walt Disney
United Kingdom	September 9, 2011	Digital download	Walt Disney
