= Diving (song) =

Single by Bridgit Mendler featuring RKCB
- Released: August 25, 2017
- Recorded: August 2017
- Genre: Alt pop
- Length: 3:40
- Label: Black Box
- Songwriter(s): Bridgit Mendler
- Producer(s): RKCB

Bridgit Mendler singles chronology
"Can't Bring This Down" (2017)	"Diving" (2017)

Music video
- "Diving" on YouTube

"Diving" is a single recorded by American recording artist Bridgit Mendler, featuring American group RKCB. The single was released digitally to retailers on August 25, 2017 via Black Box. The song's music video directed by Vlad Sepetov along Mendler herself was released the same day on her official VEVO channel.

== Composition ==
"Diving" is a "bass-heavy" cut that has been compared to that of Cassie, Tinashe, and Jhené Aiko. The song lyrically is a nostalgic song about a lost love.

== Critical reception ==
Sana Parvayz from CelebMix called the song a "smooth jam".

== Track listing ==
- Digital download
  1. "Diving" (featuring RKCB) – 3:40
- Vice remix
  1. "Diving" (Vice remix) – 3:14

== Release history ==
Region	Release date	Format	Ref.
Various	August 25, 2017	Digital download	
