= Breakthrough (Lemonade Mouth song) =

2011 song

Single by Cast of Lemonade Mouth

from the album Lemonade Mouth
- Released: May 2, 2011
- Recorded: 2010
- Genre: Synth-pop
- Length: 3:27
- Label: Walt Disney
- Songwriters: Bryan Todd; Maria Christensen; Shridhar Solanki; Adam Hicks
- Producers: Twin; Bryan Todd

Bridgit Mendler singles chronology
"Determinate" (2011)	"Breakthrough" (2011)	"Ready or Not" (2012)

Adam Hicks singles chronology
"Determinate" (2011)	"Breakthrough" (2011)	"Las Vegas (My City)" (2011)

Hayley Kiyoko singles chronology
"Breakthrough" (2011)	"A Belle to Remember" (2013)

Naomi Scott singles chronology
"Breakthrough" (2011)	"Say Nothing" (2014)

"Breakthrough" is a song performed by the cast of 2011 American film Lemonade Mouth including Bridgit Mendler, Adam Hicks, Hayley Kiyoko, Naomi Scott and Blake Michael. The song was written by Bryan Todd, Maria Christensen, Shridhar Solanki and Adam Hicks and produced by Twin and Bryan Todd. It was released as the album's third and final single on May 2, 2011, through Walt Disney Records.

== Composition ==
Mendler's vocals span from the low note of D♭_{3} to the high note of E♭_{5}.

== Chart performance ==
The song debuted and peaked at number 88 on the US Billboard Hot 100 and at number 11 on the US Top Heatseekers chart.

== Music video ==
The music video was taken from the scene in the film when the band sings the song.

== Track listing ==
- Digital download
1. Breakthrough — 3:27

== Charts ==
Chart (2011)	Peak position
UK Singles Chart	200
US Billboard Hot 100	88
US Kid Digital Songs (Billboard)	3
US Top Heatseekers (Billboard)	11
