= Bridgit Mendler =

American actress and singer (born 1992)

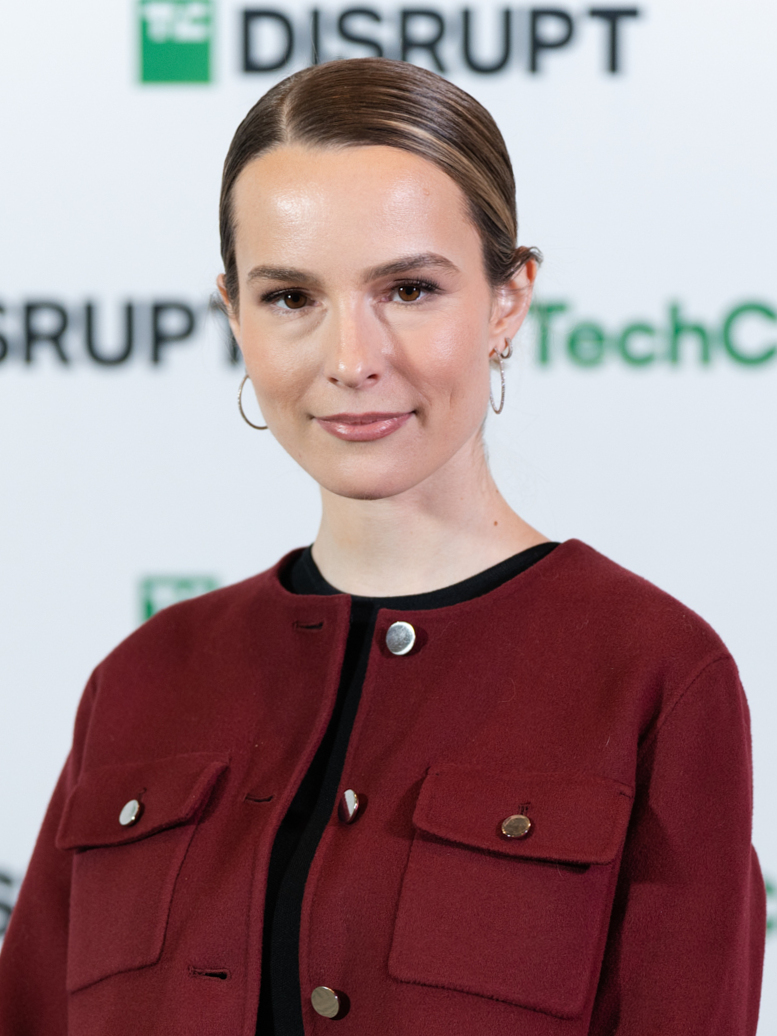
- Mendler in 2024
- Born: Bridgit Claire Mendler; December 18, 1992 (age 33); Washington, D.C., U.S.
- Education: University of Southern California (attended); Massachusetts Institute of Technology (MS); Harvard University (JD)
- Occupations: Entrepeneur; actress; singer; songwriter
- Years active: 2004–present
- Works: Discography; songs recorded; concert tours; filmography
- Title: CEO and Co-Founder of Northwood Space
- Spouse: Griffin Cleverly (m. 2019)
- Children: 1
- Relatives: Christine Blasey Ford (aunt)
- Awards: Full list
- Musical career
- Genres: Pop; R&B; alt pop
- Instruments: Vocals; guitar; keyboard; keytar
- Years active: 2004–2017
- Labels: Hollywood; Black Box

Bridgit Claire Mendler (born December 18, 1992) is an American entrepreneur and former actress, singer, and songwriter. She first became known as a child actress and continued acting into adulthood, which overlapped with a musical career in the 2010s. After enrolling at MIT and Harvard from 2017 to 2024, she co-founded Northwood Space, a satellite data startup.

Mendler's early acting credits include the films Alice Upside Down (2007), The Clique (2008) and Labor Pains (2009). After signing with Disney Channel in 2009, she played Juliet van Heusen on Wizards of Waverly Place (2009–2012) and soon rose to fame for her lead role as Teddy Duncan on Good Luck Charlie (2010–2014); she also starred as Olivia White in the musical film Lemonade Mouth (2011) for the network. After leaving Disney, she appeared on the NBC sitcom Undateable (2015–2016), the ABC/CMT musical television series Nashville (2017), and the Netflix comedy series Merry Happy Whatever (2019).

Mendler began her music career contributing to the soundtrack of Lemonade Mouth in 2011, which produced her first singles "Somebody" and "Determinate", with each being certified gold and platinum respectively. Her debut studio album, Hello My Name Is... (2012), reached number 30 on the US Billboard 200 and entered five international charts. Its lead single, "Ready or Not", received platinum certifications in four territories and appeared on ten charts worldwide; "Hurricane" and "Top of the World" were also released, with the former being certified gold by the RIAA. She then independently released an extended play, Nemesis (2016), which earned critical praise and spawned the singles "Atlantis" and "Do You Miss Me at All". She has embarked on three tours: Live in Concert (2012), Summer Tour (2013–2014) and Nemesis Tour (2016–2017).

From 2010 to 2012, Mendler was an ambassador for nonprofit First Book, which encourages reading, and Give with Target, to raise funds to reform schools in the United States. She was a student and researcher with the MIT Media Lab from 2017 to 2023. She is also registered as a PhD candidate with MIT's Center for Constructive Communications and Social Machines group. In 2024, she became the CEO and co-founder of the satellite data startup Northwood Space, and earned a JD from Harvard Law School. As of January 2026, Northwood Space has raised over $100 million.

== Early life and education ==
Bridgit Claire Mendler was born on December 18, 1992, in Washington, D.C. to Charles and Sandy (née Ford) Mendler. She has one younger brother named Nick (b. 1997). Mendler moved to Mill Valley, California with her family at the age of eight. It was there where she first expressed interest in acting and began working in plays. When she was eight years old, Mendler began taking part in local roles in both dramatic and musical theatre, and became the youngest performer in the San Francisco Fringe Festival. When she was 11 years old, she hired an agent to help her get acting jobs. Mendler is the niece of psychologist Christine Blasey Ford.

In the 2010s, Mendler studied towards a degree in anthropology at the University of Southern California (USC) in Los Angeles, California. Two members of her band also studied at USC. In an interview with Brian Mansfield of USA Today, Mendler said: "My plan right now is just to do one class at a time and see how that goes. I'm just going to study something that will be interesting and doable from the road and just take care of my general education courses for now. I want to know something outside of what I do." In 2013, she chose anthropology and studied Medieval Visual Culture, and medical anthropology. To the University Star, Mendler said USC was important: "I think seeing that college life and what that would've been like, it does make you wonder what sort of lifestyle that would be, but I'm really grateful for what I have, and I think it's cool that, because my career path is not as formulaic, I can kind of decide when I want to take time off to do certain things." Her mother was pursuing a doctorate in public policy at USC at the time. Mendler dropped out of USC in 2016. In May 2017, Mendler was announced as one of the 2017 MIT Media Lab's Director's Fellows.

In May 2018, she announced on Twitter that she started a graduate program at the Massachusetts Institute of Technology (MIT) with a focus on improving social media: "As an entertainer, for years I struggled with social media because I felt like there was a more loving and human way to connect with fans." In 2020, she completed an M.S. in media arts and sciences at MIT. Her master's thesis was titled OurStory: Dispute System Design Technology for Stakeholder Inclusion. Deb Roy was her thesis advisor. She later began working on her Ph.D with MIT's Center for Constructive Communications and Social Machines group. During 2022, she was enrolled at Harvard Law School and at MIT. In May 2024, she was awarded a Juris Doctor from Harvard Law.

== Career ==
=== Acting ===
In 2004, Mendler got her first voice acting role in the animated Indian film The Legend of Buddha, in which she portrayed young Buddha. Mendler got her second voice acting role in 2005 as the voice of the character Thorn in the video game Bone: Out from Boneville, which was based on the Bone comic series. When she was 13 years old, she got her first acting role as a guest star on the soap opera General Hospital, playing the dream child of character Lulu Spencer. That same year, Mendler voiced the character Thorn in the video game Bone: The Great Cow Race. In 2007, Mendler made her film debut in the film adaptation of the Alice series, titled Alice Upside Down. For the film's soundtrack, Mendler provided backing vocals on the song "Free Spirit", performed by Alyson Stoner. Also in 2007 Mendler auditioned for Sonny with a Chance for the role of Sonny Munroe, but Demi Lovato was chosen.

In 2008, it was announced that Mendler would play the role of Kristen Gregory in the film adaptation of the popular teen novel series The Clique by Lisi Harrison. She had begun working on a film with actress and singer Lindsay Lohan titled Labor Pains, which kept being pushed back due to various conflicts and problems. Though initially slated for a theatrical release, the film did not receive one in the US and was instead released as a TV film on ABC Family in 2009. It became the week's top cable film among coveted female demographic groups. She had a supporting role in the film Alvin and the Chipmunks: The Squeakquel. In 2009, Mendler became a recurring character in the Disney Channel series Wizards of Waverly Place. Mendler portrayed the role of Juliet van Heusen, a vampire who later forms a romance with David Henrie's character Justin Russo. Mendler would go on to appear in eleven episodes total for the series, spanning from 2009 to 2012 when the series ended.

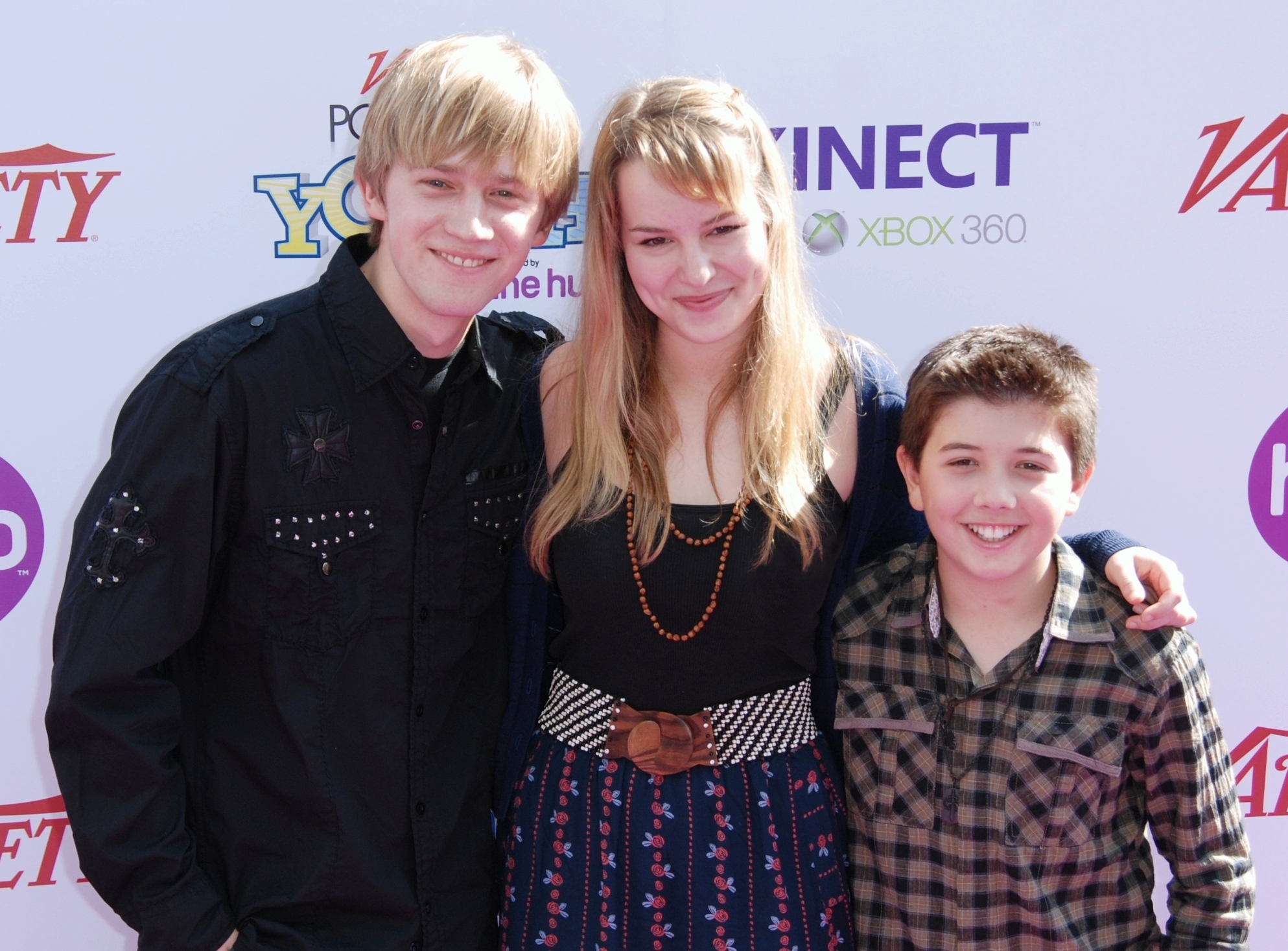
Mendler (middle) with fellow Good Luck Charlie cast members Jason Dolley (left) and Bradley Steven Perry in October 2010

In 2010, Mendler played Teddy Duncan in the Disney Channel series Good Luck Charlie, centering on a teenage girl who makes videos for her baby sister to watch as she gets older. The series premiered on April 4, 2010, and was met with a positive critical reception and viewership. In 2011, she starred as Olivia White, the lead role in the Disney Channel Original Movie Lemonade Mouth, watched by 5.7 million viewers on its premiere night. In an interview with Kidzworld Media, Mendler confirmed that there will not be a sequel to Lemonade Mouth, commenting: "There's not [going to be a sequel to Lemonade Mouth] unfortunately. We had such a great experience working on the movie, and they tried to figure something out for a sequel, but everyone at Disney felt like the movie had completed its story in the first movie. It was a great experience, and I loved working with the cast members and still see them frequently." The same year, Mendler had the supporting role of Appoline in the straight to DVD film Beverly Hills Chihuahua 2. Also, Mendler reprised her role as Teddy Duncan in the Disney Channel television film Good Luck Charlie, It's Christmas!, which premiered on December 2, 2011. In 2012, she guest-starred in the television series House as Callie Rogers, a homeless runaway teenager with a mysterious illness. She voiced the lead role of Arrietty in the American English dub of The Secret World of Arrietty.

On November 25, 2014, Mendler was announced as an unlucky yet optimistic waitress Candace in the NBC comedy series Undateable in season two. In early 2015, NBC renewed with Mendler for a third season that consisted entirely of live episodes, which premiered October 15 of that year. Following the third season, it was announced that NBC had cancelled continuation of the series. In October 2016, Mendler was cast as Ashley Willerman on the fifth season of the CMT television series Nashville.

On February 10, 2017, Mendler was cast in lead role of the Fox comedy television pilot Thin Ice, created by Elizabeth Meriwether, but the network ultimately passed on the pilot in May. She appeared in the Netflix comedy film Father of the Year along with David Spade, Joey Bragg, Matt Shively and Jackie Sandler, which was released July 20, 2018. In November 2019, Mendler appeared in the eight-part Netflix comedy television series, Merry Happy Whatever, along with Dennis Quaid, Ashley Tisdale, and her Undateable co-star Brent Morin.

=== Music ===
Mendler performed numerous songs for the soundtrack of Lemonade Mouth, which was released on April 12, 2011, by Walt Disney Records. The first single released from the soundtrack, titled "Somebody", was released on March 4, and peaked at number 89 on the US Billboard Hot 100 chart. The second single, "Determinate", charted in numerous other countries and peaked at number 51 on the Billboard Hot 100. Mendler recorded the song "This Is My Paradise" for Beverly Hills Chihuahua 2, which was released as a promotional single on January 11, 2011, with a music video directed by Alex Zamm. On March 31, 2011, it was confirmed that Mendler had signed with Hollywood Records, and had begun working on her debut album. The song "I'm Gonna Run to You" was co-written and performed by Mendler, and was also featured in Good Luck Charlie, It's Christmas! and released as promotional single on November 12, 2011. Mendler later co-wrote and sang the Disney's Friends for Change Games anthem called "We Can Change the World", released as her third promotional single on June 11, 2011. For The Secret World of Arrietty, she recorded a song, "Summertime", which was released as a promotional single on February 2, 2012.

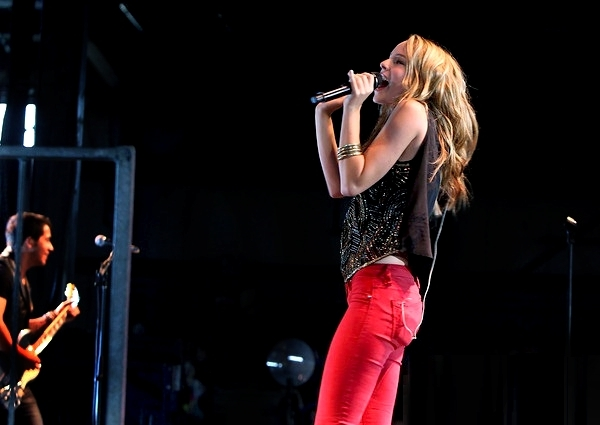
Mendler performing on her debut tour, Live in Concert, in 2012

In mid-2012, Mendler confirmed that the title of her official debut single was "Ready or Not", written by Mendler herself, Emanuel "Eman" Kiriakou and Evan "Kidd" Bogart. The song was released for digital download on August 7 and for radio airplay on August 21, 2012. "Ready or Not" peaked at 49 in the United States and 53 in Australia, but at number seven in the United Kingdom and within the top twenty of the charts in Belgium, the Republic of Ireland and New Zealand. The song received platinum certification in the United States and Canada and Gold in Denmark, New Zealand and Norway. Mendler ventured on her first headlining tour, Bridgit Mendler: Live in Concert, supporting her first studio album. The tour primarily reached only North America and she played at state fairs, music festivals and Jingle Ball's concerts series. Mendler's debut album, Hello My Name Is..., was released on October 22 by Hollywood Records and all the songs were written by Mendler with collaborators, included 12 tracks in standard version and 15 in deluxe edition. Mendler was also involved in its production. The album peaked at number 30 on the Billboard 200 and sold less than 200,000 copies in the country. Hello My Name Is... charted in several countries including Poland, Australia, United Kingdom, France and Spain. Mendler's vocals have been compared to Lily Allen, Cher Lloyd, Jessie J and Karmin. She released two promotional singles on the album: "Forgot to Laugh" and "Top of the World".

On February 12, 2013, her second single, "Hurricane", was released for radio airplay. The song peaked at number 1 on the Billboard Bubbling Under Hot 100 in the United States. On April 2 Mendler released a remix single version and, on June 21, an EP remixed. Also in June Mendler debuted her second tour, the Summer Tour, reaching only the United States. On April 30 she released the extended play Live in London, by Universal Music, recorded at a special performance in the United Kingdom. On November 16, 2013, was premiered the music video for acoustic version of "Top of the World", directed by Matt Wyatt. She recorded it on her own, independent of Hollywood Records, and filmed in Griffith Park, in Los Angeles. On June 28, 2014, Mendler began the second leg of her Summer Tour, in Charlottetown, Prince Edward Island, Canada. On that date, she sang one of her new songs, "Fly to You", about a relationship that was said to be on the rocks but worth fighting for. On July 5, she performed another new song, "Deeper Shade Of Us", with disco influences.

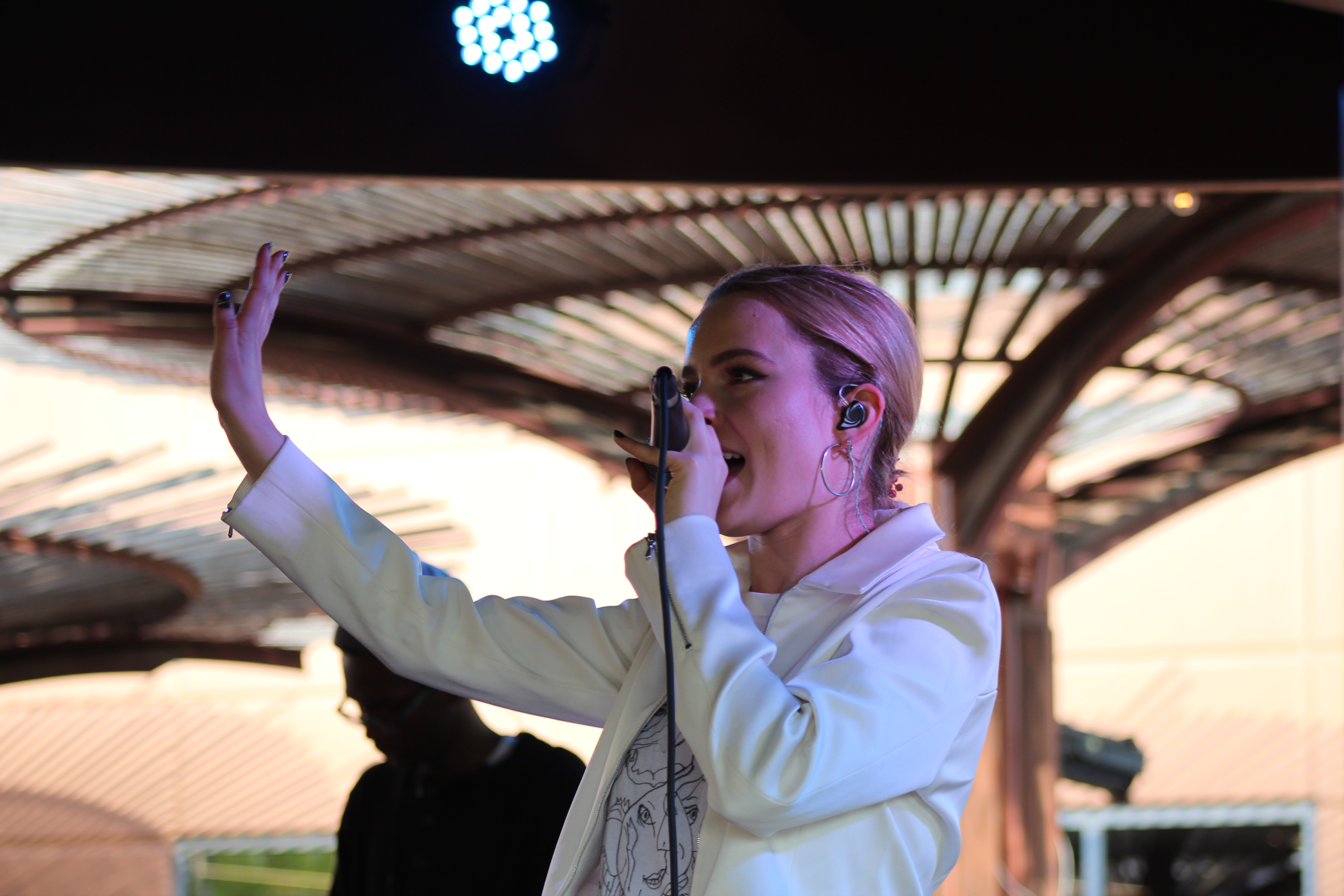
Mendler performing at South by Southwest (SXSW) in 2017, for the Nemesis Tour

In 2013, Mendler started working on her second album. Mendler discussed some of the producers and songwriters she was working with, including Mitch Allan, Dan Book, Alexei Misoul, Augie Ray, Beloryze, TMS, Ina Wroldsen, and Steve Mac. At one point, the entire album was rewritten after her computer failed and she lost all of her entries. After initial reports, it was confirmed on July 2, 2015, that Mendler left Hollywood Records earlier in the year. On August 4, 2016, Mendler announced the title of her new single, "Atlantis", featuring Kaiydo, which was released on August 26, 2016. She released a follow-up single "Do You Miss Me at All" on November 4. Both tracks were featured on her EP Nemesis, which was released on November 18. In an interview with MTV News, she said that "I feel like I've poured the most of myself of anything I've done into this project. That's been a very therapeutic process." She also hoped that the EP would give fans a "more well-rounded perspective" on her image post-Disney. To support the album, she went on the Nemesis Tour from 2016 to 2017. On February 3, 2017, Mendler announced her new single, "Temperamental Love" featuring Devontée. The music video was featured the YouTuber Jam in The Van. On August 25, 2017, Mendler released a single titled "Diving" with American group RKCB. The official music video was released hours after the release of the song.

On June 10, 2026, a six-track EP titled Once Again... was released without Mendler's knowledge, who clarified that she did not approve of its release. It was originally distributed by the Orchard, owned by Sony Music, and taken down from streaming and digital platforms the following day.

=== Entrepreneurship ===
Logo for Mendler's company Northwood Space

In 2023, Mendler and her husband founded Northwood Space, a satellite data startup. The venture-backed company, where she is CEO, is based in El Segundo, California, and intends to mass produce satellite ground stations. Mendler told CNBC that the idea for the company was conceived during her stay in New Hampshire during the COVID-19 lockdowns. She said that "While everybody else was making their sourdough starters, we were building antennas out of random crap we could find at Home Depot. For me, why the ground-side matters is because it actually is about bringing the impacts of space home to people."

In an article for Hero magazine with Lemonade Mouth co-star Naomi Scott, Mendler explained her career shift: "I think I started to feel a bit of that disconnect with what I was doing in my day-to-day, in entertainment and started to put out feelers into more of the research domain. Then visiting the MIT media lab, I just felt like it was such fertile territory to explore something about an impact that would go into a different space, and beyond. I palpably remember that point in the transition, because music is always my first love, I love it so deeply, but I remember being at South by Southwest and just feeling... Lonely. Finding your artistic community can be so hard."

Northwood launched with $6.3 million in funding from investors including the Founders Fund and Andreessen Horowitz. In 2025, Mendler reported to Bloomberg that Northwood had raised $30 million. The company later raised $100 million in 2026.

== Other ventures ==
=== Activism and philanthropy ===
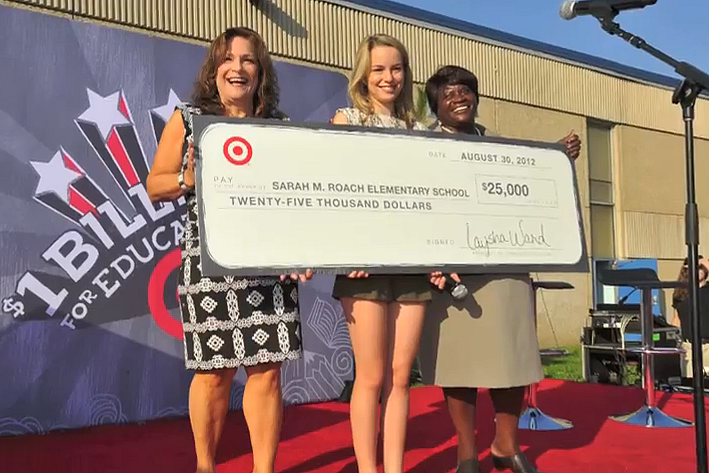
Mendler visiting a school in Baltimore, Maryland, to donate $25,000 for Target's campaign in 2012

In 2010, Mendler became ambassador to First Book, a service that encourages reading and provides books to children in need. In 2011 it became part of Disney's Friends for Change, a pro-social "green" initiative of charity for environmental issues encouraging fans to take action. As campaign theme that year Mendler released a promotional single on June 11, "We Can Change the World", raising $250,000 for the Disney Worldwide Conservation Fund. She also participated of the Disney's Friends for Change Games, an Olympic-based televised games aired on the Disney Channel, getting $125,000 donation to UNICEF as Yellow Team captain and also competing for $100,000. But her team lost to the World Wide Fund for Nature. In 2012 Mendler won the honorary award Common Sense Media as Role Model of the Year for her work against bullying. Mendler was the third young artist to win the award, which usually honors environmentalists and scholars. She also attended the annual UNICEF acoustic concert in New York to raise donations for charity in January 2013. In July 2012 Mendler became ambassador of the campaign Give With Target with department store chain Target to raise funds to reform schools in the United States. The campaign aims to get $1 billion by 2015. To start the Target campaign, they invested $5 million and distributed $25,000 grants to 100 in-need schools for the school year. Mendler said about the incentive: "I'm excited to partner with Target on their Give With Target campaign and celebrate the start of a new school year with kids across the country. It's so important for all kids to have everything they need for a successful school year." In August, she got $5 million donated by The Walt Disney Company and more than $2 million donated by people at Facebook.

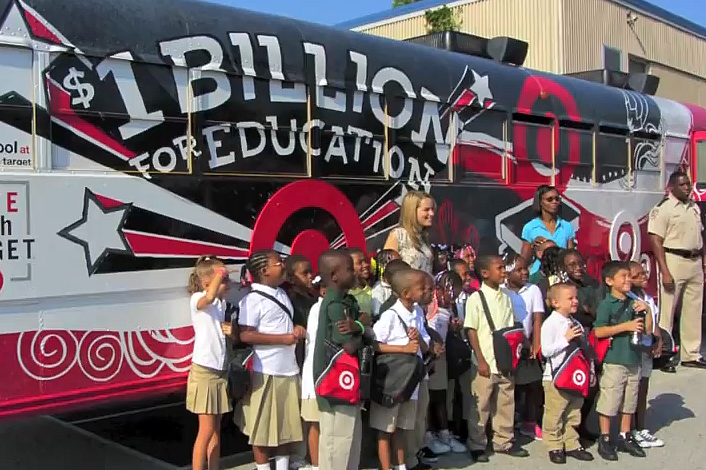
Mendler with children-in-need in Baltimore, in 2012

Mendler was featured in a March 2013 public campaign Delete Digital Drama with Seventeen magazine to end cyberbullying. About the campaign she said "Being bullied is something I experienced in school and it is not fun. ... I love working to end cyberbullying. People don't have to push back as much as they would in real life. People need to realize bullying has just as much of an impact online because words are so cutting and difficult to deal with". She also worked with Acuvue being a mentor to help Katie, a winner of the 2013 Acuvue 1-Day Contest, get closer to her dream of making a difference. In October 2013, Mendler hosted the event We Day of Free The Children Foundation, a campaign that helps build schools for underprivileged children in Canada and the United States. Also for Free The Children Foundation she was godmother of We Create a Change to help needy children.

In November 2013, Mendler participated in the World Challenge Marathon for Save the Children Foundation, a charity race to help children with health problems. In March 2014, Mendler traveled to the region of El Quiché, Guatemala to participate in the other project of Save the Children that helps underprivileged children in developing countries. On April 8, she launched the Baby Sit In, a campaign that asked for teens to help give parents a break and give babies a healthy start to their life. Mendler said "It's an easy way for kids to help little ones everywhere get a healthy start and an opportunity to learn just by doing something they do most weekends anyway". Mendler represented the institution during the charity congress Save the Children's Annual Advocacy Summit in Washington, D.C. Carolyn Miles, the Save the Children's president, thanked Mendler publicly for humanitarian work: "We are thrilled to have Bridgit on board. Her passion for helping children truly came through when she met with families and kids during her visits to the remote communities in the deserts of California and Guatemala's western highlands".

=== Endorsements ===
In 2012, Mendler signed with Target to release an exclusive line of clothing inspired by her character Teddy Duncan of Good Luck Charlie. The D-Signed by Teddy Duncan fashion collection includes clothing, accessories, hats, scarves, and souvenirs for girls in range from 4 to 18 years old. In March 2013, a Spring edition was also released. While promoting her debut single "Ready or Not", Mendler signed with The Hunt, a mobile app which combines clothes and shows fashion tendencies. She released exclusively her music video and registered some personal clothes and fashion searches. She also had her own version in the games FanFUN FANfinity. While promoting her debut album Hello My Name Is..., Mendler offered exclusive album promotions through Target. In 2014, she signed with the line of dermatology products Clean & Clear and recorded several commercials and campaigns for real beauty.

== Artistry ==
=== Influences ===
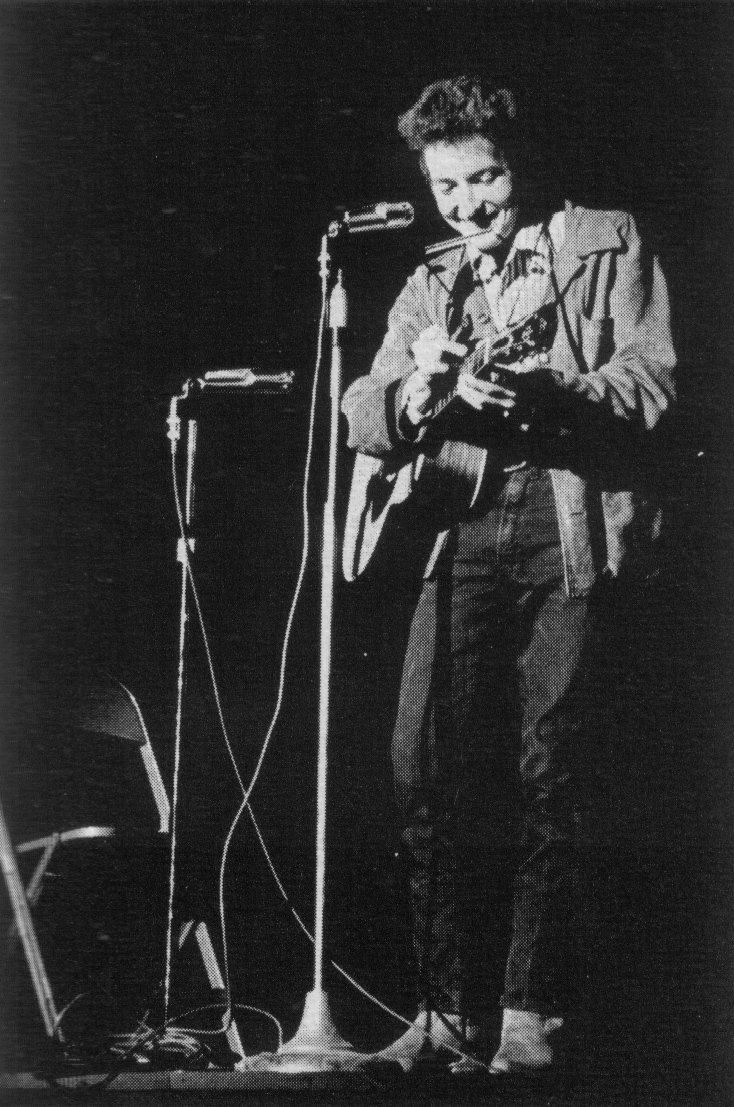
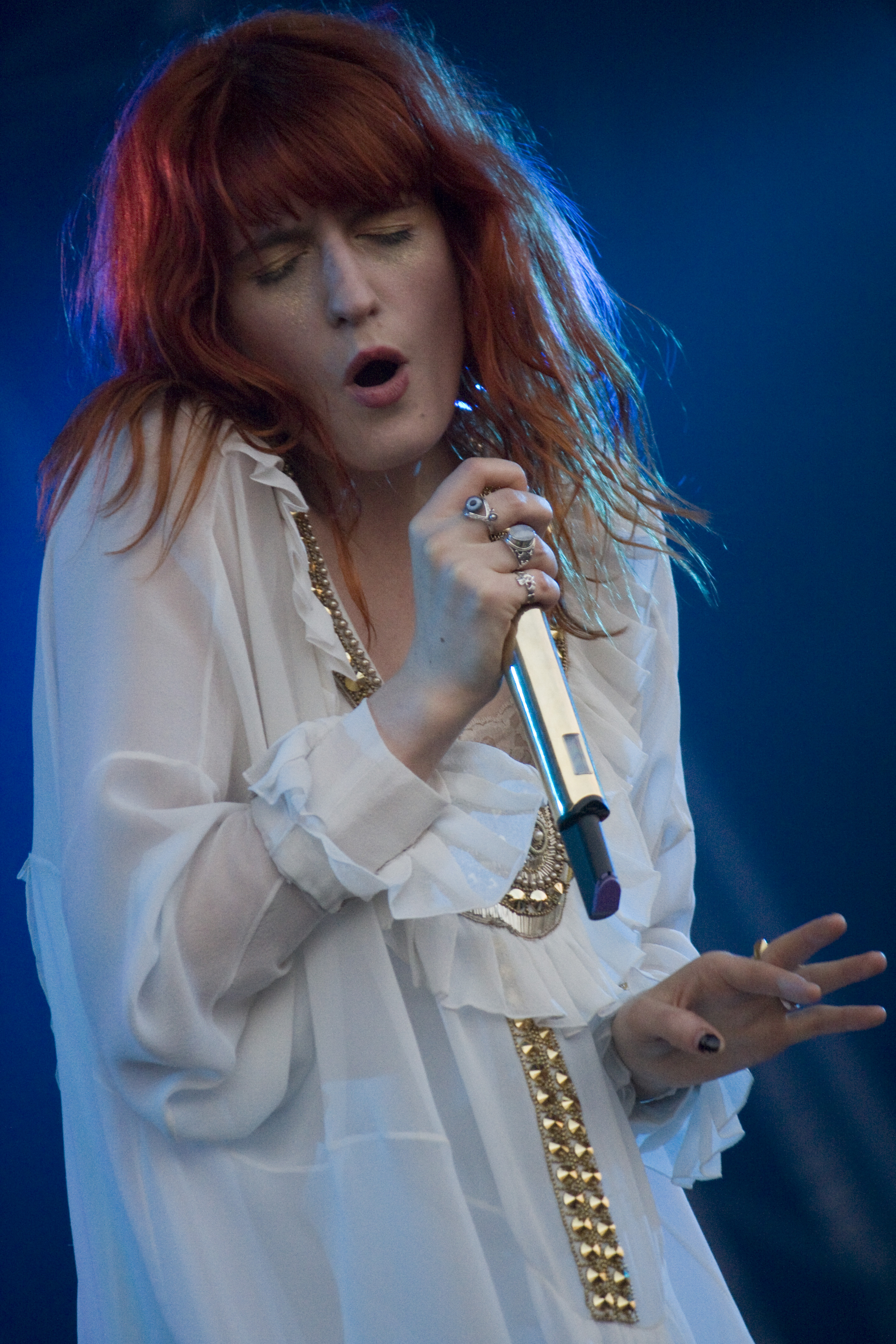
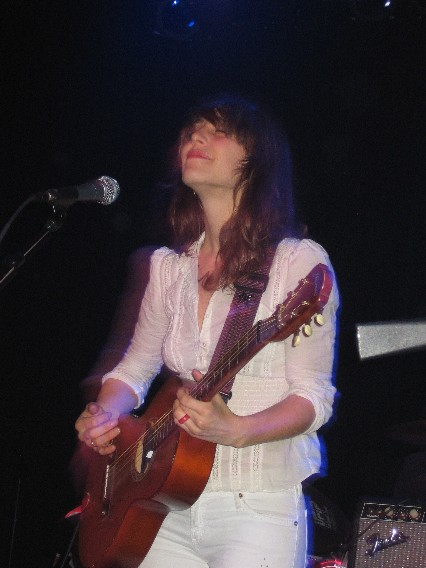
Mendler has cited Bob Dylan (left), Florence and the Machine (center) and Feist (right) as her musical influences.

Mendler has cited Bob Dylan as her biggest musical influence. To Ed Condran of Hartford Courant she said that: "You look at what Bob Dylan and artists like him have done and you just can't help but be blown away. I'm just glad I have the opportunity to start with this and I just want to take it as far as I can". In an interview with Disney Channel Netherlands, she revealed that her favorite song was "Don't Think Twice, It's All Right" from Dylan's 1963 album The Freewheelin' Bob Dylan. To Taylor Trudon of Huffington Post she said: "He was the first musician I got into where I paid attention to songwriting. He has a way of writing songs that's really playful with lyrics, but at the same time he's saying something that people feel is important and that they relate to. He spoke for a whole generation.". Also to Trudon, Mendler cited Etta James, Elvis Presley, B. B. King, Ella Fitzgerald and Billie Holiday, and talked about these artists: "I love that they have soul in their voices. I think that's something important". Other musical influences include Elvis Costello, The Delfonics, Red Hot Chili Peppers and Van Morrison. During an interview with Yahoo!, in 2012, Mendler also commented that her first female influence was the Hip hop girl group Salt-N-Pepa and sang an impromptu a cappella rendition of the song "Shoop".

She said hip hop trio Fugees had great influence in her music training and also the recording of the debut album and song "Ready or Not", "One of the writers was like 'Check out this Fugees song, 'Ready or Not'. So we all listened to it and were like that would be kind of fun to do some sort of interpolation off of that song, which is what we did. I think it stands by itself as its own song but it still has that memorable quality of the Fugees song, which is fun. I think we were all really proud of it and hoping it will go far". For her debut album, Hello My Name Is..., Mendler was inspired by indie pop singers Ingrid Michaelson and Feist. Among pop music artists, she cited Maroon 5, No Doubt, Destiny's Child, Justin Timberlake, Mariah Carey, Beyoncé and Bruno Mars. She cited Jamie Foxx as a great model of how to have a career in acting and music.

Mendler says that she is influenced by British neo-soul music, and listed Ellie Goulding, Florence and the Machine, Marina Diamandis, Lily Allen, and Lianne La Havas as her biggest British influences. She has also mentioned Natasha Bedingfield, Broken Bells, Mark Ronson and Amy Winehouse. In 2013, Mendler revealed to have a big admiration for the Adele's musical style. To Disney Channel UK she said that "admire the career of Adele, because she has her own musical style. She does things her way and writes about things she is passionate about. It is really working out well for her". She was also influenced by Canadian artists Feist and Tegan and Sara. To Hartford Courant, she commented: "I've been a fan of Tegan and Sara's for awhile. They just do what they want to do. They don't follow trends". She covered the song "I Was a Fool" by the duo and released with the message: "I heard this song by Tegan and Sara a couple weeks ago and couldn't stop singing it, so I just had to do my own version". In 2014, she mentioned in an interview to CKQK-FM Canadian artists Nelly Furtado, Joni Mitchell and European bands Coldplay and Little Dragon as influences in composing her second album.

In acting career, Mendler has cited some influences as Jamie Foxx, Natalie Portman and Rachel McAdams. About McAdams she said that "She plays a variety of roles, she has a lot of charisma, and she doesn't try to live her life in the public eye". She also admires the dedication of Christian Bale: "I could not live my life as committed to the craft as he does, with body transformations and such, he goes to such extremes but he is very admirable". Mendler also mentioned Lindsay Lohan as a great actress.

=== Lyrical themes and songwriting ===
I think the fear when writing a song always that the outside world won't think it's as awesome as you do. That's the scary part about progressing through releasing the song, and also the fun part in sharing it with other people. Sharing that experience with all of these people, it goes from being something that's very much for me and for the other writers who wrote with me, into being something that's for everybody else. That's what performing is. You're giving it to everyone else. I think that that's really cool, it's also super trippy, because you'd never think this thing that you created in a small room with four other people would be something you'd get to share with so many people".

— Mendler about the writing process.

Thematically, Guilherme Tintel of Portal It Pop has noted that Mendler was not immature as the first work of other Hollywood Records artists. Tintel compares her songs to Jessie J, Katy Perry, Natalia Kills and Taylor Swift. Mendler said that the writing process isn't hard, because she was influenced by her own experiences. Her debut single, "Ready or Not", talks about self-confidence and deal with boys. To Pop Dirt Mendler said: "I consider myself to be that girl sitting at the curb waiting for the world, so I think it's a great message to send to just go for the things that you want to take charge of". Her debut album discussed relationships ("Rocks at My Window", "Top of the World", "Love Will Tell Us Where to Go", "The Fall Song" and "Hold On for Dear Love"), break-up ("5:15"), alienation and romantic chaos ("Hurricane" and "Forgot to Laugh"), self-confidence ("Ready or Not"), self-esteem ("City Lights"), friendship ("We're Dancing"), and blonde girls ("Blonde").

To Hartford Courant, she commented that writing is a compulsion. "It's also something I really enjoy. I like to create. It's part of being a recording artist. I love to write songs". Mendler also said she didn't want to make commercial songs, but timeless songs. "I want to make music that stands the test of time. You look at what Bob Dylan and artists like him have done and you just can't help but be blown away. I'm just glad I have the opportunity to start with this and I just want to take it as far as I can. I wanted variety and to just make things really interesting. This isn't just something that comes out of a machine. It came out of me. This isn't about product. I want to grow as an artist. I remember listening to certain recording artists and songs that had a really big impact on me".

=== Musical and voice style ===
Mendler is a mezzo-soprano. She plays guitar, keyboard, and keytar. Sávio Alves of Febre Teen Magazine said that Mendler's voice was "strong and sweet". He calls Mendler's voice as having a "metallic tone" and this being "rare in young female singers". Her voice was compared to indie and blues artists. Her music is generally pop and reggae fusion and has features of R&B, funk, and hip hop soul. In an interview, she said she prefers to escape the traditional pop and dance-pop and adding other elements. "I have funky, R&B tendencies when I write by myself. I really love doo-wop and a jazzy swing beat. Rhythm is a big emphasis in my own writing". Her voice and style has been compared to Cher Lloyd and Lily Allen. Her vocals were compared to Miley Cyrus, who also started on the Disney Channel, but in a 2009 interview to Christian Post Mendler said: "I'm not Miley Cyrus. There may be some similarities but I'm my own person." In 2013, during an interview with the Huffington Post, Mendler was compared to other young artists and asked if she would follow the footsteps in pop music. Mendler said that "They've done so much and they're so talented. I think it's tricky because they've been obviously very successful, but I think you always want to be your own person and not be categorized by doing the same thing".

== Public image ==
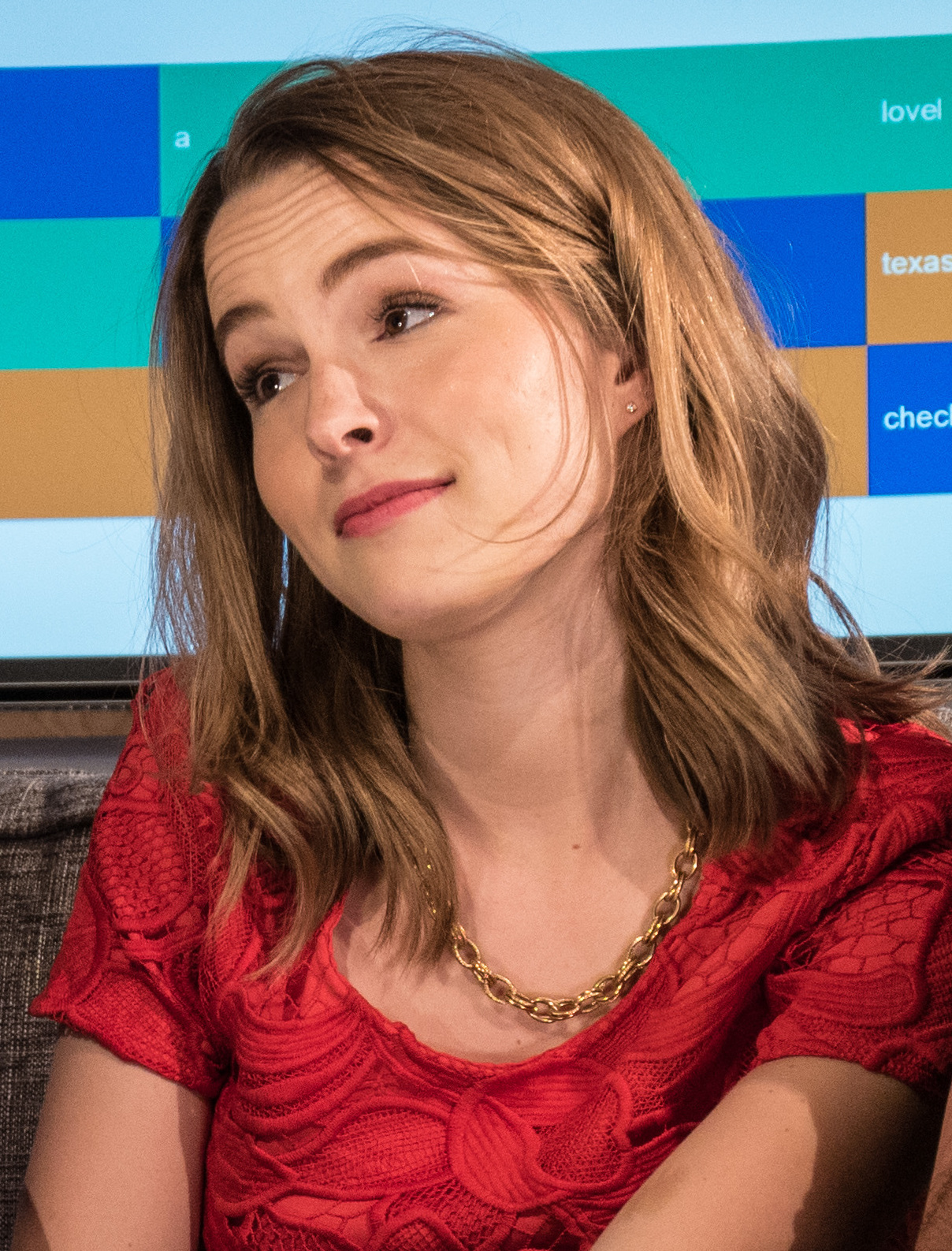
Mendler in a 2015 interview at SXSW

Mendler was included on Billboard's "21 Under 21: Music's Hottest Minors" list in 2012. In 2013, she also appeared in the list of thirteen. She was also chosen as one of the ten hottest young female artists by Forbes Woman. In 2012, Mendler was chosen as role model of the year by Common Sense Media, a non-profit organization that honors innovative minds from the worlds of entertainment, public policy and technology and rewards mainly teachers, scientists and philanthropists. She was honored for her charity work in anti-bullying actions, improving the lives of families by providing a trustworthy role model and creating a positive impact in the world. Mendler was the second youngest artist to win the award, after Miranda Cosgrove.

Mendler's acting performances have been praised by critics. She was called "likeable and amazing" in Lemonade Mouth (2011) by Khalid McCalla of The Oberlin Review. Carolina Malis of the South China Morning Post believed the role "truly showcased her versatility, blending acting with singing and setting the stage for a career that would soon blossom beyond the boundaries of teen stardom." Cami Seymore of The Post agreed that Lemonade Mouth brought attention to her acting and musical abilities. In a review of Good Luck Charlie, It's Christmas! (2012), Kihoon Lee of The Cardinal Times called Mendler "talented", "loveable and sweet". James Knight of Classicalite opined that Undateable (2015–2016) "only showed up on the radar" because of Mendler's casting and performance. David Bloom of Deadline agreed and deemed Mendler a "powerhouse". Daniel Fienberg of The Hollywood Reporter noted Mendler's chemistry with Undateable co-star Brent Morin, which he believed was utilized well in Merry Happy Whatever (2019), Mendler's last screen performance. In his review of the latter series, Brett White of Decider called her and the cast a "real gift".

Mendler's music has received mixed-to-positive reviews from critics. Seventeen compared her debut album Hello My Name Is... to the works of Carly Rae Jepsen and Demi Lovato. Tim Sendra of AllMusic defined Mendler's voice as "idiosyncratic" while reviewing Hello My Name Is... and called it "an impressive debut from a singer who shows real talent and has every chance to break out of the Disney mold and do something all her own down the road." Sendra also praised Mendler's "songwriting chops". Sherman Yang of MSN deemed the tracks of Hello My Name Is... "catchy" but felt "Mendler either needs to find some inspiration to write better songs or cover other artists' works because her songs sound the same after a while." Her second extended play Nemesis was reviewed positively by Ailbhe Malone of The Irish Times, who believed Mendler was "back and trendy," and described it as "delicate and interesting but still vibey. Welcome to grown-up pop, Bridge – we're happy to have you." Andrea Domanick of Vice agreed, believing that with Nemesis, Mendler "heeds honesty over any kind of carefully crafted post-Disney identity."

Mendler's shift to business and entrepreneurship has been cited as one of the few examples of a successful career reinvention. Sarah Bregel of BBC wrote: "as a woman in science who changed career paths to pursue her dream, Mendler may likely inspire other women to make timely career pivots." Katie Louise Smith of Capital praised Mendler's "incredible career path", and Lynette Rice of Deadline said Mendler had "quite the career trajectory for a former Mouse House darling". People magazine deemed her a "Triple Threat" in 2025 for her work in acting, music, and entrepreneurship.

== Personal life ==
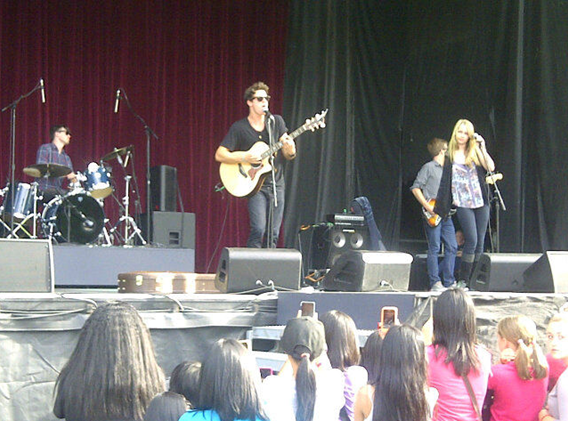
Mendler performing with her then-boyfriend, Shane Harper, in 2011

Mendler began dating former Good Luck Charlie co-star Shane Harper in May 2011. In November 2015, their breakup was confirmed after months of speculation. In October 2019, Mendler announced via Instagram that she had married Griffin Cleverly. In February 2024, Mendler announced that she and Cleverly adopted a 4-year-old boy around Christmas 2022 after they began fostering him in 2021.

== Filmography ==
=== Film ===
Year	Title	Role	Notes
2004	The Legend of Buddha	Young Siddhartha	Voice role
2007	Alice Upside Down	Pamela Jones	
2008	The Clique	Kristen Gregory	
2009	Alvin and the Chipmunks: The Squeakquel	Becca Kingston	
2009	Labor Pains	Emma Clayhill	
2011	Beverly Hills Chihuahua 2	Appoline	Direct-to-video; voice role
2012	The Secret World of Arrietty	Arrietty	Voice role
2014	Muppets Most Wanted	Wedding Guest	Deleted scene
2014	Lennon or McCartney	Herself	
2018	Father of the Year	Meredith	

=== Television ===
Year	Title	Role	Notes
2006	General Hospital	Lulu's dream daughter	1 episode
2009	Jonas	Penny	Episode: "Wrong Song"
2009–2012	Wizards of Waverly Place	Juliet van Heusen	Recurring role
2010–2014	Good Luck Charlie	Teddy Duncan	Lead role
2011	Disney's Friends for Change Games	Contestant	
2011	Lemonade Mouth	Olivia White	Television film
2011	Good Luck Charlie, It's Christmas!	Teddy Duncan	Television film
2012	House	Callie Rogers	Episode: "Runaways"
2013	Violetta	Herself	Episode: "A Celebrity, a Song"
2013	We Day	Host	Television special
2013	Jessie	Teddy Duncan	Episode: "Good Luck Jessie: NYC Christmas"
2015–2016	Undateable	Candace	Main role
2017	Nashville	Ashley Willerman	Episode: "Let's Put it Back Together"
2019	Merry Happy Whatever	Emmy Quinn	Main role

=== Video games ===
- Bone: Out from Boneville (2005) as Thorn
- Bone: The Great Cow Race (2006) as Thorn

== Discography ==
- Hello My Name Is... (2012)

== Tours ==
- Live in Concert (2012)
- Summer Tour (2013–2014)
- Nemesis Tour (2016–2017)
