= Somebody (Bridgit Mendler song) =

Single by Bridgit Mendler

from the album Lemonade Mouth
- Released: March 4, 2011
- Recorded: 2010
- Genre: Pop rock
- Length: 3:28
- Label: Walt Disney
- Songwriter(s): Lindy Robbins; Reed Vertelney
- Producer(s): Reed Vertelney

Bridgit Mendler singles chronology
"Somebody" (2011)	"Determinate" (2011)

"Somebody" is a song performed by American recording artist Bridgit Mendler for the soundtrack Lemonade Mouth to the Disney Channel television movie of the same name. It was written by Lindy Robbins and Reed Vertelney and released as the album's debut single on March 4, 2011 through Walt Disney Records.

== Background and composition ==
"Somebody" is the first single released from the soundtrack Lemonade Mouth (2011), for the Disney Channel television movie of the same name. It was produced by Reed Vertelney, who also co-wrote with Lindy Robbins. Musically, the song is pop rock. Mendler's vocals span from the low note of F♯_{3} to the high note of E♭_{5}.

== Critical reception ==
Pop Dust criticized the lack of consistency in the production of the song, calling it as unattractive: "The song's not that bad—it's professionally mediocre at the very least—but it's hard to not wish that Disney had used this chance to at least attempt to humor the teenage-outsider contingent. Something to demonstrate at least token awareness of high-school misfitdom extending beyond the slightly goofier Jonas Brothers".

== Chart performance ==
The song debuted (and peaked) at number 89 on the US Billboard Hot 100 and number 12 on the US Billboard Heatseekers chart. In its first week, the song sold 6,000 copies in the United States according to Nielsen SoundScan.

== Music video ==
A lyrics music video was released on the Disney website later that same day. On March 18, 2011, the official music video for the song premiered on Disney Channel during a special Prom-themed episode of The Suite Life on Deck. It was directed by Brandon Dickerson.

== Track listings ==
- Digital download
1. Somebody — 3:28

== Charts ==
Chart (2011)	Peak position
US Billboard Hot 100	89
US Kid Digital Songs (Billboard)	3

== Certifications ==
Certifications for "Somebody"
Region	Certification	Certified units/sales
United States (RIAA)	Gold	500,000^{‡}
^{‡} Sales+streaming figures based on certification alone.

== Release history ==
Country	Date	Format	Label
United States	March 4, 2011	Digital download	Walt Disney
United Kingdom	April 15, 2011	Digital download	Walt Disney
