= Do You Miss Me at All =

Single by Bridgit Mendler

from the album Nemesis
- Released: November 4, 2016
- Genre: Alt pop; R&B
- Length: 3:30
- Label: Black Box
- Songwriters: Bridgit Mendler; Spencer Bastian; Mischa Chillak
- Producers: Bastian; Chillak

Bridgit Mendler singles chronology
"Atlantis" (2016)	"Do You Miss Me at All" (2016)	"Temperamental Love" (2017)

Music video
- "Do You Miss Me at All" on YouTube

"Do You Miss Me at All" is a song recorded by American recording artist Bridgit Mendler. It premiered via Noisey on November 3, 2016, and was released on November 4, 2016, as the second and final single from her extended play, Nemesis (2016).

== Background ==
In an interview with Noisey's Kim Taylor Bennett, Mendler said about the song "I wrote 'Do You Miss Me at All' while I was driving around Golden Gate Park in San Francisco, missing a boy. Missing someone can be a solitary feeling. You don't always know that the person on the other end feels the same way. This song was my way of coping with the radio silence!"

"Do You Miss Me at All" went viral on the social media platform TikTok in late 2023.

== Critical reception ==
The song was critically acclaimed by music critics. Mike Wass of Idolator said "Bridgit Mendler relaunched in August with a hazy track called 'Atlantis'. While impressive as a statement of intent, it was perhaps a little too far removed from the radio-friendly anthem 'Ready Or Not' and 'Hurricane'. She got the alt bit right but forgot about the pop. The 23-year-old rectifies that situation today with the adorable 'Do You Miss Me At All'. The production is still weird and wonderful, but the catchy chorus and relatable lyrics make it more accessible". Pigeons and Planes' Charlotte Freitag called it "cathartic" and "a simmering breakup track", while going on to say "over a sultry bass line, sharp percussion, and a swirling synth pad, Mendler sings wistfully about lost love. Her vocal prowess is on full display throughout the song, showing itself in the form of soaring harmonies, impressive runs, and a unique tone quality".

== Live performances ==
Mendler performed her first performance of "Do You Miss Me at All" at the Billboard Studios. She also performed her first performance televised of "Do You Miss Me at All" at the Young Hollywood.

== Remixes ==
Mendler released a remix of the song featuring the American duo Marian Hill on December 2, 2016. On December 16, 2016, Bridgit released other remix of the song, this time by Pusher.

== Music video ==
On November 18, 2016, a music video for the song was released. Idolator's Rachel Sonis described the music video: "The clip sees Mendler first staring out of the front door of her house, looking for her significant other. We see her croon the song behind glass windows, door screens and even in the shower, as she clearly grows more and more anxious when she realizes he's actually not coming."

=== Critical reception ===
Rachel Sonis of Idolator stated "It's an interesting, eerie visual, exploring the dichotomy of how things seem and how they actually are. No wonder we all weave such tangled webs."

== Release history ==
Region	Date	Format	Label	Ref.
United States	November 3, 2016	Streaming	Black Box	
United States	November 4, 2016	Digital download	Black Box	
