= Summer Tour (Bridgit Mendler) =

2013–14 concert tour by Bridgit Mendler

- Tour by Bridgit Mendler
- Associated album: Hello My Name Is...
- Start date: June 16, 2013
- End date: November 3, 2014
- Legs: 2
- No. of shows: 47

Bridgit Mendler concert chronology
- Live in Concert (2012); Summer Tour (2013–14); Nemesis Tour (2016–17)

The Summer Tour is the second concert tour by the American singer Bridgit Mendler. In 2013 the tour visited North America to support her debut album Hello My Name Is..., where it started in Burlington, Iowa and ended in Arlington, Texas. The setlist included all the songs from Hello My Name Is..., except "The Fall Song" and "Love Will Tell Us Where to Go". She also covered two songs in her performances: "Starry Eyed", by British singer Ellie Goulding, and "Animal", by American band Neon Trees.

In 2014 Mendler announced the second leg of the tour. The leg started in Charlottetown, Canada, on June 28, 2014. Mendler kept the same setlist from their previous album and included two new songs, "Fly to You" and "Deeper Shade of Us", from her upcoming second studio album. She also changed the covers, including "Magic", by British band Coldplay, and "Latch", by Disclosure and Sam Smith. In November 2014 Mendler would travel for the first time outside of North America with the tour to perform in South America in three countries, but they were cancelled.

== Background and development ==
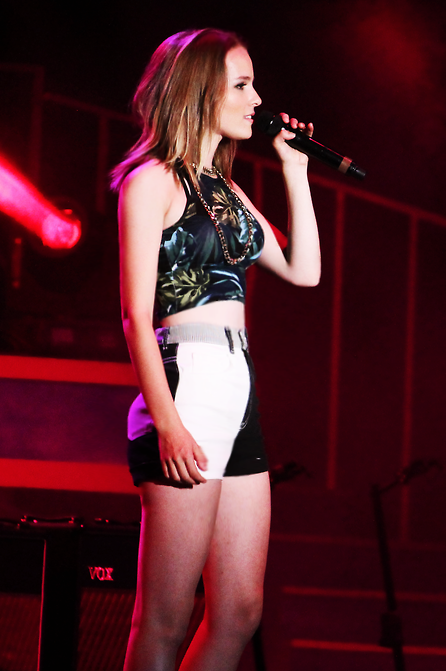
Mendler performing in 2014

On June 5, 2013, Mendler announced on her website that she would have a summer tour to promote her debut album Hello My Name Is.... In the beginning of June, Mendler announced tour dates on her official website kicking off June 16 in Burlington, Iowa. On June 7, she released in her Instagram the promotional banner of the tour, created by graphic artist Ashkahn Shahparnia, and revealed some dates. On July 31, Mendler said she spent a year and a half rehearsing with her band before the tour. She introduced her band, formed by Eric Nicolau as music director on guitar and backing vocals, Roberto Cerletti in drums, Neara Russel in piano and backing vocals and Nick K in bass. In an interview with Cambio, Mendler commented about the tour saying:

"I'm so excited to tour this Summer, I get to go and meet people in different parts of the USA", Mendler also said what people would expect of the tour, "I think it's a great opportunity to me, to get to know the audience better. I feel like my music is pretty new and I haven't had a huge opportunity to tour around because I was working on Good Luck Charlie, so I'm excited to share the music with people and I hope they enjoy it."

Mendler and the band were housed in her own bus that traveled the United States and Canada for concerts. In an interview to Artist Direct, she said that she rehearsed for months for reach the emotions also live. "Actually singing the songs live has been something I've definitely had to adjust to. They're not always easy songs. I'm proud of the arrangement we have now. I'm enjoying it. On August 1, Mendler said in an interview with Cambio she will take her tour to Europe when she finished American cities, but she did not tell the dates or countries.

== Promotion ==
Prior to the beginning of the tour, Mendler released a teaser video on her YouTube channel displaying video content. She conducted several interviews to talk about the tour and promoted it in a mini-concert for the Grammy Academy. In April 30 she released the extended play Live in London, by Universal Music, recorded at a special performance in the United Kingdom. Mendler not held shows in the country, but promoted the American leg. She said that was inspired particularly by Bob Dylan and Gwen Stefani on stage and cited their energy and presence. In interview to The Star Magazine, she also said he was inspired by the way Adele shows emotions on stage and she tried to do the same. "Adele did an amazing show. I really learned a lot about how she makes her performance because she is not a dancer, just a singer and storyteller. Adele made everyone feel as if you were in her living room. She told stories and interacted with the audience".

== Concert synopsis ==
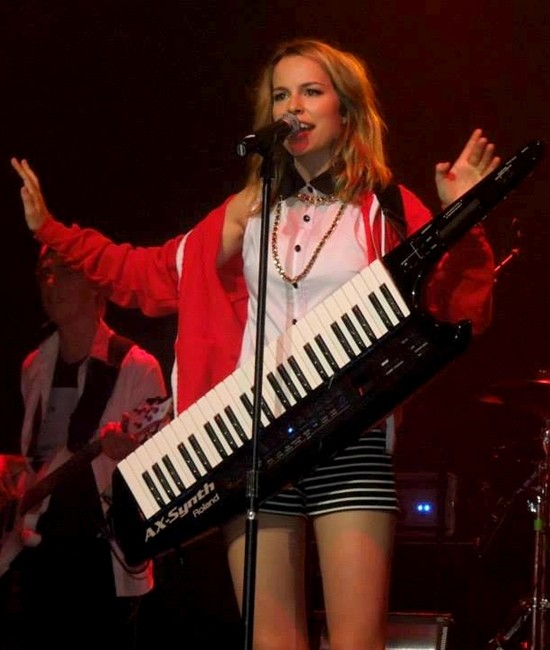
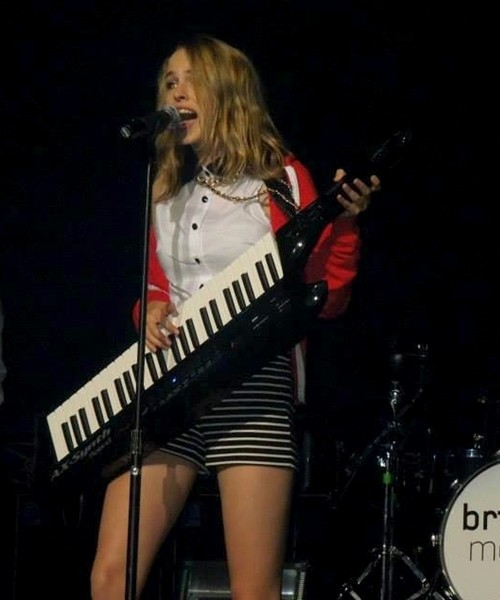
Mendler performing in Kansas City in July 2013

Mendler included all the songs from the standard version of Hello My Name Is..., except "The Fall Song" and "Love Will Tell Us Where to Go". She also covered two songs on performances: "Starry Eyed", by British singer Ellie Goulding, and "Animal", by American band Neon Trees. In an interview to Artist Direct, Mendler said that "Rocks at My Window" and "Hold On for Dear Love" were the only songs from the album not to be performed. She learned keytar to play in "City Lights".

On February 13, 2014, Mendler revealed in an interview to KTLA Morning News that she would tour in summer, reaching United States and Canada. The tour is a pre-promotion before her second album is released. The shows will start in Charlottetown, on June 28, 2014. Mendler kept the same setlist from their previous album and included two new songs, "Fly to You" and "Deeper Shade of Us", from her upcoming second studio album. She also changed the covers, including "Magic", by British band Coldplay, and "Latch", by Disclosure and Sam Smith. Mendler donated part of the Gross Revenue of the first four shows to charity campaign Save the Children.

In September Mendler announced that she would travel to South America for concerts, in Scream Fest festival. Her first performance outside North America would be in Argentina, on November 7, 2014. She would also perform in Chile, at Movistar Arena, and Peru, at Jockey Club. However, just some days before, organizers announced that South American shows of the tour would not take place. First, the organizating agency released a brief note informing about the cancelling in Argentina, due to "the conjunctural situation that takes place in this country, affecting the artists in Scream Fest". Just after, the Chilean organization of the concerts announced withdrawal as well. The notes promised that Bridgit would return probably in April or May 2015, but no new dates for possible shows were announced, and plans for a South American leg of Mendler's tour were definitely abandoned.

== Critical reception ==
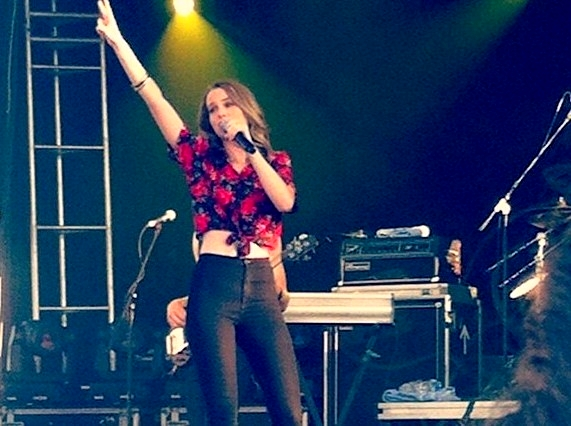
Mendler performing in Canada, in June 2014

Tim O’Shei from The Buffalo News called the show "different – and that’s good" and cited as positive her expressions, emotions and onstage movements on stage, saying "She physically plays out the lyrics of her songs". He also compared Mendler to other young stars as Miley Cyrus and Selena Gomez, said she doesn't have the "pop presence", but it was good, because "she possesses an onstage quality they don’t" and cited personality and earthiness. Volcano Staff from North West Military said Mendler is "freaking cute" and "adorable" and she shows all her emotions.

Keith Groller from The Morning Call was also positive about Mendler's voice, calling it "surprisingly good" and said she "has a much better voice, a more pleasing personality and a better idea of what her fans expect from her". He also commented that all the girls at the shows wanted to be like Mendler, and he observed that she did not undress or explore her body on stage.

== Opening acts ==
- Austin Mahone (Main dates)
- R5 (only in Aurora and Agawam)
- Shane Harper (only in Oregon)
- Alex Aiono (only in Arlington, Kansas City and Dubuque)
- Carter Matthews (only in Burlington)

== Set list ==
Bridgit Mendler

Leg 1 (2013)
1. "Hurricane"
2. "Top of The World"
3. "Forgot to Laugh"
4. "City Lights"
5. "All I See Is Gold"
6. "5:15"
7. "Starry Eyed" (Ellie Goulding cover)
8. "Love Will Tell Us Where To Go"
9. "Animal" (Neon Trees cover)
10. "Blonde"
11. "Rocks At My Window"

Encore

12. "Ready or Not"
Leg 2 (2014)
1. Intro
2. "Hurricane"
3. "Blonde"
4. "Fly to You"
5. "Deeper Shade of Us"
6. "Ready or Not"
7. "Magic" (Coldplay cover)
8. "All I See Is Gold"
9. "5:15"
10. "Latch" (Disclosure and Sam Smith cover)
11. "Love Will Tell Us Where To Go"
12. "City Lights"
13. "Top of The World"
14. "Forgot to Laugh"
15. "Rocks At My Window"

Opening acts

Austin Mahone
1. "Banga Banga"
2. "Say You're Just a Friend"
3. "Say Somethin"
4. "What About Love"
Shane Harper
1. "One Step Closer"
2. "Rocketship"
3. "Dance With Me"
4. "Dancin' In The Rain"
R5
1. "Loud"
2. "Cali Girls"
3. "Can You Feel It"
4. "I Want You Bad"
Carter Matthews
1. "The Best Part Of Me"
2. "Be With You"
3. "Again"
4. "After All"
Alex Aiono
1. "Love on Fire"
2. "Alphabet Soup"
3. "Doesn't Get Better"
4. "Time of Your Life"
Stereo Jane
1. "Sing It"
2. "Detroid Girl"
3. "Plush"
4. "Love is Electric"

== Tour dates ==
Date	City	Country	Venue
Leg 1 - North America
June 16, 2013	Burlington^{[A]}	United States	Mississippi Riverfront
June 26, 2013	Del Mar^{[B]}	United States	Grandstand Stage
July 22, 2013	Kansas City	United States	Uptown Theater
July 23, 2013	Dubuque	United States	Dubuque County Fair
July 24, 2013	Costa Mesa	United States	Pacific Amphitheatre
August 8, 2013	Santa Rosa	United States	Sonoma County Events Center
August 14, 2013	Los Angeles	United States	Hollywood Palladium
August 16, 2013	Royal Oak	United States	Royal Oak Music Theatre
August 17, 2013	Lima	United States	Allen County Fair
August 18, 2013	Aurora	United States	Riveredge Park
August 20, 2013	Agawam	United States	Six Flags New England
August 21, 2013	New York City	United States	Best Buy Theater
August 23, 2013	Washington, D.C.	United States	Warner Theatre
August 24, 2013	Williamsburg	United States	Busch Gardens Amphitheater
August 25, 2013	Jackson Township	United States	Six Flags Great Adventure
August 27, 2013	Albany	United States	Palace Theatre
August 28, 2013	Allentown	United States	Great Allentown Fair
August 29, 2013	Glenside	United States	Keswick Theatre
August 31, 2013	Salem	United States	Oregon State Fair
September 7, 2013	Hutchinson	United States	Kansas State Fair
September 8, 2013	Spencer	United States	Clay County Fair
September 9, 2013	Salt Lake City	United States	Utah State Fair
September 21, 2013	Puyallup^{[C]}	United States	State Fair Grandstand
October 13, 2013	Arlington^{[D]}	United States	Six Flags Over Texas
Leg 2 - North America
June 28, 2014	Charlottetown	Canada	Charlottetown Event Grounds
July 5, 2014	Tampa	United States	Busch Gardens
July 19, 2014	Hot Springs	United States	Timberwood Amphitheater
July 20, 2014	Arlington	United States	Music Mill Amphitheatre
July 26, 2014	Wildwood	United States	Wildwoods Convention Center
July 27, 2014	Rye	United States	Playland
August 2, 2014	Denver	United States	Elitch Gardens
August 3, 2014	Jeffersonville	United States	Tanger Outlet Center
August 9, 2014	Hamburg	United States	The Fairgrounds
August 10, 2014	Jeffersonville	United States	Tanger Outlet Centers^{[e]}
August 15, 2014	Pittsburgh	United States	Tanger Outlet Centers^{[e]}
August 16, 2014	Deer Park	United States	Tanger Outlet Centers^{[e]}
August 22, 2014	North Charleston	United States	Tanger Outlet Centers^{[e]}
August 24, 2014	Locust Grove	United States	Tanger Outlet Centers^{[e]}
August 29, 2014	Park City	United States	Tanger Outlet Centers^{[e]}
August 30, 2014	Houston	United States	Tanger Outlet Centers^{[e]}
August 31, 2014	San Marcos	United States	Tanger Outlet Centers^{[e]}
September 30, 2014	Tulsa	United States	Built Ford Tough Livestock Complex
October 29, 2014	Huntington	United States	The Paramount
October 30, 2014	Albany	United States	Palace Theatre
November 1, 2014	Uncasville	United States	Mohegan Sun Arena
November 2, 2014	Richmond	United States	National Theater
November 3, 2014	Freehold	United States	iPlay America

== Cancelled shows ==
List of cancelled concerts, showing date, city, country, venue and reason for cancellation
Date	City	Country	Venue	Reason/Additional Info
July 20, 2013	Arlington, Texas	United States	Six Flags Over Texas	Rescheduled for October 13th due to a fatal accident at the theme park hours before the concert was scheduled to begin. Tickets from the original date were still good for the rescheduled date.
November 7, 2014	Buenos Aires	Argentina	Microestadio Malvinas Argentinas	Conjunctural situation of country
November 9, 2014	Santiago	Chile	Movistar Arena	Conjunctural situation of Argentina
November 11, 2014	Lima	Peru	Jockey Club	Conjunctural situation of Argentina

== Notes ==
Notes

- A: This concert was a part of Burlington Steamboat Days.
- B: This concert was a part of the San Diego County Fair.
- C: This concert was a part of the Washington State Fair.
- D: This concert was a part of the Six Flags Over Texas 2013 Concert Series.
- E: Mendler was the Tanger Outlet Fashion Camp & Tour 2014's lead artist.
