= Atlantis (Bridgit Mendler song) =

Single by Bridgit Mendler featuring Kaiydo

from the album Nemesis
- Released: August 26, 2016
- Genre: Electronica; Alt pop; trip hop
- Length: 3:49
- Label: Black Box
- Songwriters: Bridgit Mendler; Spencer Bastian; Mischa Chillak; Keiondre "Kaiydo" Boone
- Producers: Bastian; Chillak

Bridgit Mendler singles chronology
"Top of the World" (2013)	"Atlantis" (2016)	"Do You Miss Me at All" (2016)

Kaiydo singles chronology
"Fruit Punch" (2016)	"Atlantis" (2016)

Music video
- "Atlantis" on YouTube

"Atlantis" is a song by American recording artist Bridgit Mendler. Written by Mendler, Spencer Bastian, Mischa Chillak and Kaiydo, with Bastian and Chillak serving as producers, it was released as the lead single from the extended play, Nemesis (2016), through Black Box Media Agency on August 26, 2016. The song is widely considered to be written due to Mendler's split from former boyfriend Shane Harper.

According to Mendler, the song discusses the capability of finding love, but feeling like it has disappeared like a lost city, therefore referencing the mythical city of Atlantis. The track was considered by music critics to be a radical departure from her previous work, which featured mainstream, pop music elements. Receiving critical acclaim, critics praised the atmosphere of the song and Mendler's tube distortion voice.

== Background ==
Along with a series of Twitter posts on her official account teasing the release of Atlantis, Mendler shared the following information concerning the song's production:

"So here's how Atlantis came about. I was working with Book, one of my producers, one day at his studio in Los Angeles. He started this beat that sounded like it was underwater. I imagined fish swimming through a deserted underwater city. Very triggering sonics, Book! I wrote the melody and then as Book and I started fitting the melody into the track, I wrote some rough lyrics. Honestly, we didn't have very high expectations of the song that day. About a month later, Book brought it up in a session we were doing with Spencer, my other producer. He wanted to work on it because he believed in it, and once Spencer and Book added some elements to the track and I tweaked some lyrics, the song came alive! After that it stood out to everyone as a favorite and I'm so excited for it to be the first song we share with you"

== Composition ==
"Atlantis" is mainly an alt pop, electronica and trip hop song. About it, Mendler stated "I wrote 'Atlantis' frankly about feeling numb after heartbreak because that's what I was feeling that day we wrote it. Atlantis is a beautiful city that disappeared and was forgotten underwater. That is what it feels like to me to lose a first love. In the story, a remnant of that love is still haunting me even though it is 'asleep with the fishes.'" She also said to Idolator that "'Atlantis' is about knowing that I am capable of finding love, but feeling like it has disappeared like a lost city. I wanted to set a haunting tone to the lyrics because the song captures a very tumultuous and transformative time in my life. This song really takes ownership of that." On having Kaiydo rap in the song, Mendler said "I felt the song would be a good one to have a rapper counterpart to add a different perspective. Kaiydo met the tone of the song perfectly."

== Critical reception ==
"Atlantis" received unanimous praise. Ailbhe Malone of The Irish Times described the song as "delicate and interesting but still vibey" and a mature follow up to her previous efforts. Deepa Lakshmin of MTV labeled the song "a mellow ode to a past lover" and said that it's "a radical departure from Mendler's previous record", and went on to say that the song is "cool, refreshing, and totally different." Pigeons and Planes' Jacob Moore claimed "[Atlantis] is a departure from the saccharine flavor of previous singles like 'Ready or Not', an international hit that went platinum in several countries. 'Atlantis' is more complex, a little more difficult to process, but ultimately much more rewarding. It's an immersive piece of modern pop music that feels like something between drowning and floating, or maybe like a little of both." Rachel Sonis of Idolator called the song a "wistful anthem". Noisey's Phil Witmer stated "Mendler's voice is run through tube distortion, chopped up into pinpricks, and becomes a gorgeously vocoded choir on the cavernous hook. It's something like Imogen Heap meeting early Purity Ring, and the guest verse from Florida underground rapper Kaiydo makes 'Atlantis' a masterwork in craft and atmosphere." Burning Anchor's Angus McColl gave "Atlantis" a 5/5 star rating stating: "Overall, "Atlantis" feels like a natural departure and radical improvement from 2012's Hello My Name Is... Mendler creates a soothing, intelligent, mature song which will make you yearn for more."

=== Accolades ===
Publication	Year	Accolade	Rank	Ref.
Stereogum	2016	The Top 40 Pop Songs of 2016	28	

== Music video ==
A music video for the song was released on September 27, 2016. Samantha Boscarino, who co-starred with Mendler on The Clique and Good Luck Charlie, is featured in the music video.

=== Background ===
In an interview with Noisey, Mendler said "we went through a ton of ideas and when I first got Allie's treatment, her fresh perspective was undeniable. I told her I had my heart set on working with her and from there we found a concept that had dark, satirical, plus heart-aching moments. I break into my ex's house and try to recreate our lost love while he is passed out. Even in the midst of fun and light moments in life, my heart is as limp as his hand hitting my knee while we dance in the kitchen."

=== Critical reception ===
Phil Witmer of Noisey stated "the video fits the song's ambiguity and beguiling nature, with Mendler and her friends literally attempting to resuscitate a past relationship in dreamy vignettes that veer between celebratory and somber."

== Track listing ==
- Digital download
1. "Atlantis" (featuring Kaiydo) – 3:49
- Digital download
1. "Atlantis (Demo Taped remix)" (featuring Kaiydo) – 4:00
- Digital download
1. "Atlantis (Tunji Ige remix)" (featuring Kaiydo) – 3:23

== Release history ==
Region	Date	Format	Label	Ref.
Worldwide	August 26, 2016	Digital download	Black Box	
Worldwide	September 9, 2016	Digital download (Demo Taped Remix)	Black Box	
Worldwide	October 7, 2016	Digital download (Tunji Ige Remix)	Black Box	
