= List of awards and nominations received by Bridgit Mendler =

Bridgit Mendler awards and nominations
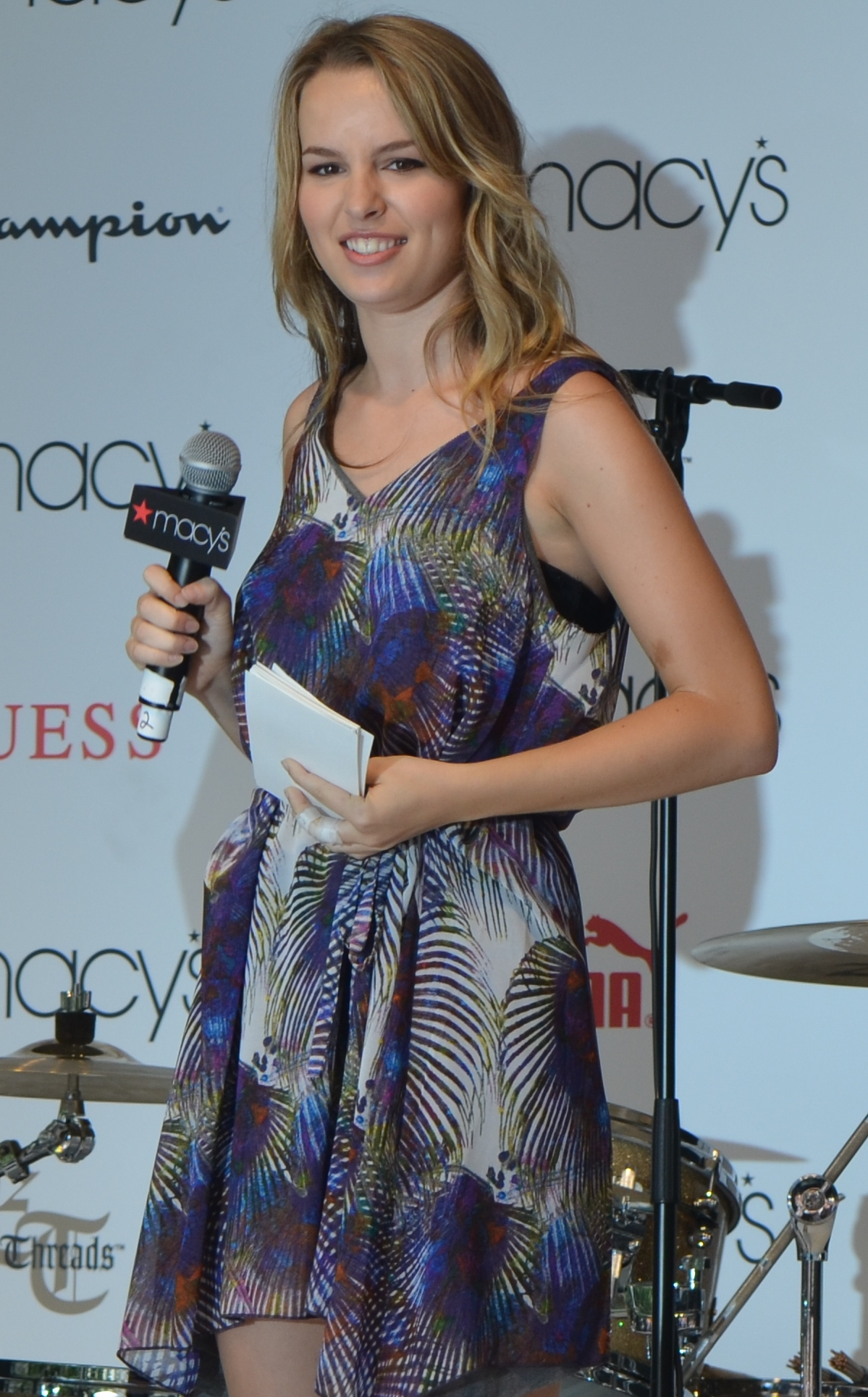
- Mendler at Macy's Annual Summer Blowout event in 2011
Awards and nominations
Award	Wins	Nominations

Totals (Note: Certain award groups do not simply award one winner. They acknowledge several different recipients, have runners-up, and have third place. Since this is a specific recognition and is different from losing an award, runner-up mentions are considered wins in this award tally. For simplification and to avoid errors, each award in this list has been presumed to have had a prior nomination.)
- Wins: 2
- Nominations: 22

Bridgit Mendler is an American entrepreneur and former actress and singer-songwriter. Her first soundtrack, Lemonade Mouth, has peaked at number 4 on the Billboard 200. Her first single, "Somebody", debuted and peaked at number 89 on the US Billboard Hot 100. Her second single, "Determinate", peaked at number 51 on the US Billboard Hot 100 and charted in two more countries. She was featured in the song, "Breakthrough" and debuted and peaked at number 88 on the US Billboard Hot 100. Mendler's debut studio album, Hello My Name Is..., was released on October 22, 2012. The first single, "Ready or Not", was released for digital download on August 7, 2012 and peaked at number 7 on the UK Singles Chart. The album's second single "Hurricane" was released on February 12, 2013.

== Awards and nominations ==
=== Acting ===
Year	Award	Category	Nominated work	Result	Ref.
2012	Kids' Choice Awards	Favorite Female TV Star	Good Luck Charlie	Nominated	
2013	Kids' Choice Awards	Favorite Female TV Star	Good Luck Charlie	Nominated	
2014	Kids' Choice Awards	Favorite Female TV Star	Good Luck Charlie	Nominated	
2013	Shorty Awards	Best Actress	Good Luck Charlie	Nominated	
2010	Teen Choice Awards	Choice TV: Female Breakout Star	Good Luck Charlie	Nominated	
2012	Young Artist Awards	Best Performance in a TV Series — Recurring Young Actress 17-21	Wizards of Waverly Place	Nominated	

=== Music ===
Year	Award	Category	Nominated work	Result	Ref.
2013	MTV Europe Music Awards	Best Push Act	Herself	Nominated	
2013	MTV Europe Music Awards	Artist on the Rise	Herself	Nominated	
2013	Radio Disney Music Awards	Best Acoustic Performance	"Ready or Not"	Won	
2013	Radio Disney Music Awards	Best Music Video	"Ready or Not"	Nominated	
2013	Shorty Awards	Best Singer	Herself	Nominated	
2013	Shorty Awards	Best Song	"Ready or Not"	Nominated	
2014	World Music Awards	Best Live Act	Herself	Nominated	
2014	World Music Awards	Best Female Artist	Herself	Nominated	
2014	World Music Awards	Best Entertainer	Herself	Nominated	
2014	World Music Awards	Best Song	"Ready or Not"	Nominated	
2014	World Music Awards	Best Video	"Ready or Not"	Nominated	
2015	World Music Awards	Best Female Artist	Herself	Nominated	
2015	World Music Awards	Best Entertainer	Herself	Nominated	
2015	World Music Awards	Best Live Act	Herself	Nominated	

=== Philanthropy ===
Year	Award	Category	Nominated work	Result	Ref.
2012	Common Sense Media Awards	Role Model of the Year	Herself	Won	
2014	Do Something Awards	Celebs Gone Good	Herself (Note: For her work with Save the Children.)	Nominated	

== Other accolades ==
=== Listicles ===
Year	Publisher	Listicle	Result	Ref.
2012	Billboard	Hottest Music Stars Under 21	16th	
2013	Billboard	Social 50 Artists of the Year	46th	
2013	Billboard	Hottest Music Stars Under 21	13th	
2012	Vevo	25 Under 25: Must-Hear Young Artists	7th	
2012	Forbes Woman	Most Beautiful Female Teenage Celebrities	9th	
2014	J-14	Hottest Celebrity Couple of the Summer (Note: Shared with Shane Harper.)	4th	
2012	Pop Dust	100 Best Songs of 2012	9th	
