= Nemesis (EP) =

EP by Bridgit Mendler
- Released: November 18, 2016
- Genres: Alt pop; R&B
- Length: 13:33
- Label: Black Box
- Producers: Spencer Bastian; Mischa Chillak

Bridgit Mendler chronology
Hello My Name Is... (2012)	Nemesis (2016)

Singles from Nemesis
- 1. "Atlantis" Released: August 26, 2016; 2. "Do You Miss Me at All" Released: November 4, 2016

Nemesis is the second extended play by American singer and songwriter Bridgit Mendler. It was released on November 18, 2016, through Black Box Media Agency. For the release of Nemesis, Mendler partnered with Fanjoy Co to create a box set of the EP, including an exclusive physical copy signed by Mendler as well as other items.

== Background ==
In an interview with MTV's Deepa Lakshmin, Mendler said about the EP "I feel like I've poured the most of myself of anything I've done into this project. That's been a very therapeutic process." She also talked about her fans watching her grow up on TV, and hoping that Nemesis would show them a "more well-rounded perspective" of who she is now, four years later. She also called the EP "a collection of regret songs."

== Critical reception ==
The EP received critical acclaim from music critics. CelebMix's Jonathan Currinn stated that the EP is "something totally different and totally unexpected" as well claiming that Mendler "is definitely channeling some indie-pop." He went on to say "[Nemesis] isn't your average EP, well it's not even your average Bridgit Mendler packaged pop songs. Instead it's a grower EP, one that has definitely put a stamp on who she is becoming. She is definitely putting a mark on the music industry, getting herself out there, and proving that she can experiment and release music that she wants to." Erica Russell of PopCrush claimed "the honey-voiced pop star explores a stormier sound and moodier themes, weaving a tale of post-heartbreak self-reflection through a deliciously atmospheric soundscape of saccharine trip hop ("Atlantis"), folksy soul ("Library"), hazy R&B ("Do You Miss Me At All") and groovy alt-pop ("Snap My Fingers")."

=== Accolades ===
Publication	Year	Accolade	Rank	Ref.
Idolator	2016	The 10 Best EPs & Mixtapes of 2016	9	

== Singles ==
"Atlantis" was released as the lead single from the EP on August 26, 2016.

"Do You Miss Me at All", the second and final single from the EP, was premiered through Noisey on November 3, 2016. It was released digitally on November 4, 2016.

=== Other songs ===
Mendler released an acoustic music video for "Library" on the same day as the release of the EP, November 18, 2016.

== Track listing ==
All tracks are written by Bridgit Mendler, Spencer Bastian and Mischa Chillak, except "Atlantis", co-written with Kaiydo. All tracks produced by Bastian and Chillak.

No.	Title	Length
1.	"Atlantis" (featuring Kaiydo)	3:49
2.	"Library"	2:56
3.	"Do You Miss Me at All"	3:30
4.	"Snap My Fingers"	3:18
Total length:		13:33

== Tour ==
Mendler began a tour in support of the extended play on November 15, 2016, which was set to travel across North America and South America, however, South America dates were cancelled.

=== Setlist ===
1. "Do You Miss Me at All"
2. "Salem"
3. "Library"
4. "Oxygen"
5. "Flowers"
6. "Where Is the Love?" (The Black Eyed Peas cover)
7. "Can't Bring This Down" with Pell
8. "Ready or Not"
9. "Atlantis"
10. "Snap My Fingers"

=== Shows ===
Date	City	Country	Venue	Opening act
North America
November 15, 2016	Los Angeles	United States	Echoplex	Hayley Kiyoko
November 18, 2016	San Francisco	United States	Rickshaw Stop	Hayley Kiyoko
November 29, 2016	Brooklyn	United States	Baby's All Right	Hayley Kiyoko
March 15, 2017 (Note: The March 15, 2017 concert in Austin, TX at Bar 96 was part of the SXSW Music Festival)	Austin	United States	Bar 96	—
March 20, 2017	Atlanta	United States	Vinyl	Powers
March 21, 2017	Carrboro	United States	Backroom @ Cat's Cradle	Powers
March 23, 2017	New York City	United States	Marlin Room @ Webster Hall	Powers
March 24, 2017	Philadelphia	United States	The Foundry @ The Fillmore	Powers
March 25, 2017	Washington, D.C.	United States	U Street Music Hall	Powers
March 27, 2017	Allston	United States	Brighton Music Hall	Powers
March 29, 2017	Toronto	Canada	Adelaide Hal	Powers
March 31, 2017	Chicago	United States	Lincoln Hall	Powers
April 1, 2017	Minneapolis	United States	7th Street Entry	Powers
April 4, 2017	Seattle	United States	Chop Suey	Powers
April 5, 2017	Portland	United States	Holocene	Powers
April 7, 2017	San Francisco	United States	Popscene @ Rickshaw Shop	Powers

== Charts ==
Chart (2016)	Peak position
US Independent Albums (Billboard)	46

== Release history ==
Region	Date	Format	Label	Ref.
Various	November 18, 2016	Digital download	Black Box	
United States	December 1, 2016	CD	Black Box	
