= Top of the World (Bridgit Mendler song) =

Single by Bridgit Mendler

from the album Hello My Name Is...
- Released: July 17, 2013
- Recorded: 2011
- Genre: Pop; R&B
- Length: 3:28
- Label: Hollywood
- Songwriters: Bridgit Mendler; Emanuel "Eman" Kiriakou; Jai Marlon; Laura Raia; David Ryan; Freddy Wexler
- Producers: Emanuel "Eman" Kiriakou; Andrew "Goldstein" Goldstein

Bridgit Mendler singles chronology
"Hurricane" (2013)	"Top of the World" (2013)	"Atlantis" (2016)

"Top of the World" is a song by American recording artist Bridgit Mendler, taken from Mendler's debut studio album, Hello My Name Is... (2012). It was composed by Mendler, Emanuel "Eman" Kiriakou, Jai Marlon, Laura Raia, David Ryan and Freddy Wexler. The song was released as a promotional single to Radio Disney on October 12, 2012 and official single on July 17, 2013.

The song was acclaimed by music critics, who praised Mendler's vocals and the song's pop influence.

== Background, development and release ==
The song was written by Mendler and American songwriters Emanuel "Eman" Kiriakou, Jai Marlon, Laura Raia, David Ryan and Freddy Wexler, and produced by Kiriakou and Andrew "Goldstein" Goldstein. Lyrically, the song is an ode to love, relationship and perseverance in love. The song was exclusively released as a promotional single on October 12, 2012 on Radio Disney. The song was released as a third official single on July 17, 2013.

== Critical reception ==
The song has received generally positive reviews from music critics. The Maximum Pop Magazine said that "Top of the World" is lovely and catchy, the composition is solid and sweet and Mendler showed versatility. Kai of the magazine Embrace You commented that the intro of the song is attractive and sounds like "a dramatic melody straight out of a classic black and white film with captions instead of voices". She also said that the transition into a more poppy and dance beat was a good surprise. But to Kai, Mendler’s high pitches during the chorus make this part of the song annoying and painful. She concluded that the song was "satisfactory". Plugged In said it was falling in love with the song and commented positively on Mendler's vocal power. Guilherme Tintel to It Pop was positive and said the song mixing soul and R & B and combines with the composition.

Tim Sendra of AllMusic gave a positive review, praising Mendler's "fine singing voice" and her "songwriting chops". Xinhau of Spin or Bin Music was positive and commented that "Top of the World" sounds like "Ready or Not" and said "left me to question whether or not it was a conscious decision". Trey M. to Rickey gave a negative review and said that the song sounds amazing, but it is forgettable.

== Music video ==
The music video was filmed on Griffith Park, in Los Angeles and directed by Matt Wyatt. It was premiered on Mendler's VEVO on November 16, 2013. The video was recorded it on her own, independent of Hollywood Records. The song on the video is an acoustic version.

== Live performances ==
The song was performed on all dates of her tours Bridgit Mendler: Live in Concert and Summer Tour. The song was featured on the twelfth season of American Idol during the episode "Charlotte Auditions". On July 23, 2013, Mendler performed the song on her official VEVO for 'The Hurricane Sessions'.

== Credits and personnel ==
Credits for the album version of "Top of the World" are adapted from Hello My Name Is... liner notes.

- Bridgit Mendler – vocals, songwriter, background vocals
- Emanuel "Eman" Kiriakou – Songwriter, Bass, Guitar, Keyboards, Producer, Programming, Ukulele,
- Laura Raia – Songwriter
- David Ryan – Songwriter
- Freddy Wexler – Songwriter
- Jai Marlon – Songwriter, Keyboards, Programming, String Arrangements, Strings, Synthesizer, Whistle
- Andrew "Goldstein" Goldstein – Producer, Background vocals, Bass, Guitar, Keyboards, Programming
- Jeremiah Olvera – Mixing Assistant
- David Ryan – Guitar
- Phil Shaouy – Guitar
- Donnell Shawn Butler – Background vocals
- Donnell Shawn – Background vocals
- Spencer Lee – Background vocals
- Freddy Wexler – Keyboards, Producer, String Arrangements, Strings, Synthesizer, Vocal Producer, Whistle
- Pat Thrall – Editing
- Jens Koerkemeier – Editing, Engineer
- Chris Gehringer – Mastering
- Serban Ghenea – Mixing

== Release history ==
Country	Date	Format	Label
United States	October 22, 2012	Promotional single	Hollywood
United States	July 17, 2013	Official single	Hollywood
