= List of Bridgit Mendler concert tours =

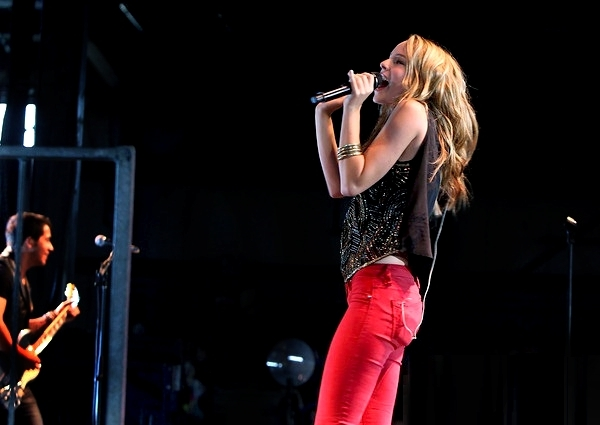
Mendler performing in Topsfield, in 2012.

American singer-songwriter Bridgit Mendler has embarked on two concert tours, one of which has been worldwide. Her debut tour, Bridgit Mendler: Live in Concert, started on August 25, 2012. Mendler played at state fairs and music festivals in the United States and Canada to promote her debut album Hello My Name Is... with the new songs. "Rocks at My Window" and "Hold On for Dear Love" were the only songs from the album not to be performed. She performing two covers songs in the shows, "Animal", originally by Neon Trees, and "This Love, by Maroon 5. She also sang a song from the soundtrack of Lemonade Mouth, "Somebody". On January 19, 2013 Mendler in New York from UNICEF charity. Her second concert, the Summer Tour, visited North America in the leg one and started in Iowa and ended in Washington. In 2014 Mendler announced the second leg of the tour as part of the release of her upcoming second album. The leg started in Charlottetown, Canada, on June 28, 2014.

== Concert tours ==
| Year | Title | Duration | Number of performances |
|---|---|---|---|
| 2012 | Bridgit Mendler: Live in Concert | August 25, 2012 – December 31, 2012 (North America) | 24 |
The Bridgit Mendler: Live in Concert was Mendler's debut tour. It promoted her first album Hello My Name Is.... Rocks at My Window" and "Hold On for Dear Love" were the only songs from the album not to be performed. She performing two covers songs in the shows, "Animal", originally by Neon Trees, and "This Love" by Maroon 5. She also sang a song from the soundtrack of Lemonade Mouth, "Somebody". The main performances was in state fairs and music festivals. The tour visited only North America – United States and Canada – with Mendler performing 25 shows through it.
| 2013–14 | Summer Tour | Leg 1: June 16, 2013 – October 13, 2013 (North America); Leg 2: June 28, 2014 – November 3, 2014 (North America) | 50 |
The first leg of Summer Tour was launched in support of her debut studio album Hello My Name Is.... It was the first Mendler's worldwide tour. Mendler added a few tour dates on her official website in April 2013. In an interview with Cambio in May, 2013. On February 13, 2014, Mendler revealed in an interview to KTLA Morning News that she start the second leg of the tour, reaching United States and Canada. The tour is a pre-promotion before her second album is released. The shows will start in Charlottetown, on June 28, 2014. Her debut international performance outside North America would be in Buenos Aires, Argentina, on November 7, 2014, but this show was cancelled.
| 2016–2017 | Nemesis Tour | November 15, 2016 – April 7, 2017 | 16 |
Mendler's third concert tour to promote her extended play Nemesis (2016).

=== Bridgit Mendler: Live in Concert ===
Bridgit Mendler: Live in Concert
- Tour by Bridgit Mendler
- Associated album: Hello My Name Is...
- Start date: August 25, 2012
- End date: December 31, 2012
- Legs: 1
- No. of shows: 24

Bridgit Mendler concert chronology
- Bridgit Mendler: Live in Concert (2012); Summer Tour (2013)

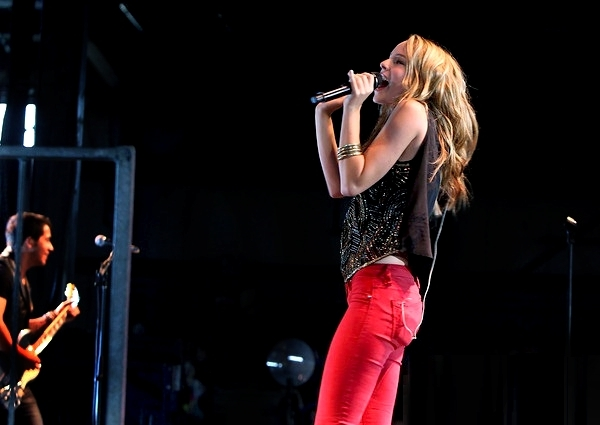
Mendler performing in Topsfield, in 2012.

Bridgit Mendler: Live in Concert is the debut concert tour by American recording artist Bridgit Mendler. Marked as the singer's headlining tour, it supported her debut album, Hello My Name Is.... The tour primarily reached North America. Mendler played at state fairs and music festivals in the United States and Canada to promote her debut album Hello My Name Is... with the new songs. "Rocks at My Window" and "Hold On for Dear Love" were the only songs from the album not to be performed. She performing two covers songs in the shows, "Animal", originally by Neon Trees, and "This Love", by Maroon 5. She also sang a song from the soundtrack of Lemonade Mouth, "Somebody".

The tour became a major success with critics and spectators alike, selling out many dates within the United States. Mendler traveled to Canada for three dates with the tour. After the release of her debut studio album, the singer toured alongside Ed Sheeran, Cher Lloyd, Austin Mahone and Owl City for the Jingle Ball's concerts series in United States for the Holiday season.

==== Tour dates ====
| Date | City | Country | Venue |
|---|---|---|---|
North America
| August 25, 2012^{[A]} | Syracuse | United States | NY State Fair in Syracuse |
| August 26, 2012^{[B]} | Toronto | Canada | Molson Canadian Amphitheatre |
| September 15, 2012^{[C]} | Los Angeles | United States | LA County Fair |
| September 28, 2012 | Brookfield | United States | Yo Mama Hall |
| October 8, 2012^{[D]} | Dallas | United States | Texas State Fair in Dallas |
| October 10, 2012^{[E]} | Topsfield | United States | Topsfield Fair |
| October 20, 2012 | Federal Way | United States | Wild Waves Theme Park |
| November 16, 2012^{[F]} | Vanderbilt | United States | Monroe Carell Jr. Children's Hospital |
| November 17, 2012^{[G]} | Jacksonville | United States | St. Johns Town Center |
| November 18, 2012 | Orlando | United States | House of Blues |
| November 24, 2012^{[H]} | Detroit | United States | Fox Theatre |
| November 25, 2012 | Fort Wayne | United States | Rhinehart Music Center |
| November 26, 2012 | Plainfield | United States | Metropolis Mall |
| November 28, 2012 | Tucson | United States | Foothills Mall |
| December 1, 2012^{[I]} | Escondido | United States | San Diego Mitchell Branch |
| December 2, 2012^{[J]} | Toronto | Canada | Air Canada Centre |
| December 5, 2012^{[H]} | Philadelphia | United States | Wells Fargo Center |
| December 6, 2012^{[H]} | Boston | United States | TD Garden |
| December 7, 2012^{[H]} | New York City | United States | Madison Square Garden |
| December 9, 2012^{[H]} | Tampa | United States | Tampa Bay Times Forum |
| December 12, 2012^{[H]} | Atlanta | United States | Philips Arena |
| December 15, 2012^{[K]} | Los Angeles | United States | L.A. Live |
| December 20, 2012^{[L]} | Tempe | United States | Tempe Marketplace |
| December 31, 2012^{[M]} | Toronto | Canada | Nathan Phillips Square |

==== Notes ====
Festivals and other miscellaneous performances

- A This concert was a part of the NY State Fair.
- B This performance was part of the line up for Canadian TV station, Family Channel's Big Ticket Summer concert and TV special.
- C This concert was a part of the LA County Fair.
- D This concert was a part of the Texas State Fair.
- E This concert was a part of the Topsfield Fair.
- F Monroe Carell Jr. Children's Hospital Charity Concert.
- G This concert was a part of the Holiday Spectacular.
- H This concert was a part of the Jingle Balls.
- I This concert was a part of the Freecember.
- J This concert was a part of the line up of Canadian TV Station, MuchMusic's, Holiday concert and TV special, The Big Jingle.
- K This performance was a part of the lineup for the Salvation Army's Rock the Red Kettle charity concert.
- L This concert was a part of the Johnjay & Rich Christmas Wish Concert.
- M This concert was a part of Canadian TV station, CityTV's, New Year's Bash TV special.

== Charity concerts ==
| Year | Title | Setlist | Notes |
|---|---|---|---|
| 2013 | UNICEF Acoustic Charity Concert | "Hurricane" "Forgot To Laugh" "5:15" "Starry Eyed" "Ready or Not" | The concert was on January 19, 2013. It was supported by Selena Gomez also. |

== Notable live performances ==
| Year | Title | Local | Setlist | Notes |
|---|---|---|---|---|
| 2011 | WestJet Concert Stage | Vancouver, Canada | "Wait for Me" "I'm Yours" "Stand by Me" "Talk to Me" (Bridgit Mendler solo) "One Step Closer" (Shane Harper solo) | Duet concert with Shane Harper. |
