= Temperamental Love =

Single by Bridgit Mendler featuring Devontée
- Released: February 10, 2017
- Recorded: February 2017
- Genre: Alt pop; R&B
- Length: 2:32
- Label: Black Box
- Songwriter(s): Bridgit Mendler; Devontée
- Producer(s): Powers Pleasant; Mischa Chillak; Spencer Bastian; Bridgit Mendler; Devontée

Bridgit Mendler singles chronology
"Do You Miss Me at All" (2016)	"Temperamental Love" (2017)	"Can't Bring This Down" (2017)

Music video
- "Temperamental Love" on YouTube

"Temperamental Love" is a song recorded by American recording artist Bridgit Mendler and Canadian rapper Devontée. It was written by Mendler and Devontée. With the two, alongside Powers Pleasant, Mischa Chillak & Spencer Bastian serving as producers for the track, "Temperamental Love" becomes the first song Mendler has co-produced. Following an announcement Mendler's InstaStories on February 10, 2017, the song was released to streaming services and made available for digital download.

== Background and composition ==
Devontée brought this beat that he made with Powers to one of my jam sessions. My bass player, Nick, laid a bass line down and then the next day I structured it and added a chorus and asked Devontée to come back over and added his rap. It’s so surreal to me that this little song is being shared with people now!

— Mendler, explaining how the track came together in an email to The Fader

The production and melody of "Temperamental Love" has been compared to Diana Ross' "I'm Coming Out". Devontée's verses were also said to have an "old school hip hop nostalgia" to them. According to Devontée, "Temperamental Love" is about the highs, lows, hot, and cold. It's the balance of life. Some days the high temperature is -3 and sometimes the high is 100 and that is the same thing as relationships to ensure it's well rounded. The song generally portrays the ups and downs of long-distance relationships, with temperature metaphors mixed in.

== Music video ==
The music video for "Temperamental Love" premiered on Nylon magazine. It was directed by Mendler, Gibson Hazard, and Vlad Sepetov and features Mendler and Devontée Surrounded by hilly landscape as they exude personality and emotion.

== Personnel ==
- Bridgit Mendler – songwriting, producer, vocals
- Devontée – songwriting, producer, vocals
- Powers Pleasant – producer
- Mischa Chillak – producer
- Spencer Bastian – producer

== Release history ==
Region	Release date	Format	Ref.
Various	February 10, 2017	Digital download	
