= 5:15 (Bridgit Mendler song) =

2012 song by Brigit Mendler

Song by Bridgit Mendler

from the album Hello My Name Is...
- Recorded: 2011
- Genre: Soul
- Length: 3:55
- Label: Hollywood
- Songwriters: Bridgit Mendler; Emanuel "Eman" Kiriakou; Priscilla Renea; Andrew "Goldstein" Goldstein
- Producers: Kiriakou; Goldstein

"5:15" is a song by American recording artist Bridgit Mendler from her debut studio album, Hello My Name Is... (2012). It was composed by Mendler, Emanuel "Eman" Kiriakou, Priscilla Renea and Andrew "Goldstein" Goldstein and produced by Kiriakou and Goldstein.

The song received positive reviews from music critics, praising Mendler's vocals and the song's soul influence. The "5:15" instrumental has been compared to "Mad About You" of Hooverphonic. The song debuted at number 65 on the South Korean International Singles Chart, making it Mendler's fifth song to chart in that country.

== Background and development ==
A pop ballad, "5:15" exhibits elements of soul, pop and jazz. Built on a piano, multi-tracked sensitive harmonies, the song's instrumentation includes slow-bouncing violin tones, bass guitar, cello, guitars and piano. Lyrically, the song is about a girl who knows she keeps giving chances to the guy and is constantly having to push him into wanting to be with her. She decides to give him one last chance, and if he blows that one too she wants to walk away from the relationship. But she knows that she might end up giving him yet another chance because she really wants to be with him. The song is a guitar-driven soul over a lightly strummed guitar, before a skittering backbeat.

== Reception ==
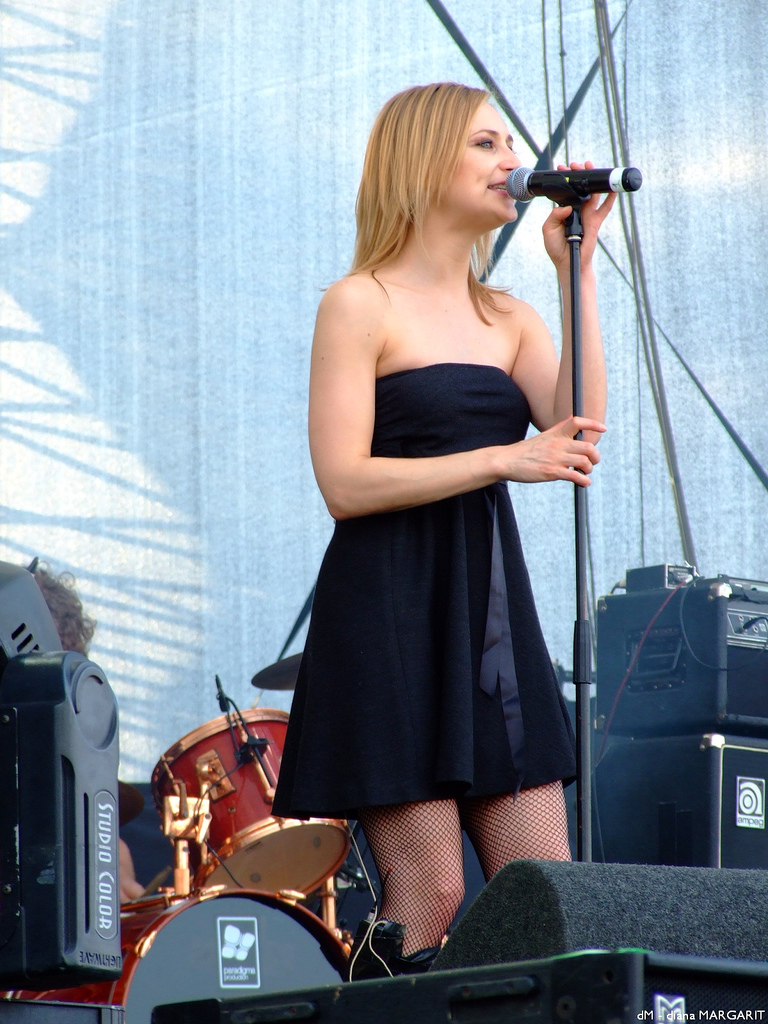
The "5:15" instrumental has been compared to "Mad About You" of Hooverphonic.

=== Critical reception ===
The song has received positive reviews from music critics. Tim Sendra of Allmusic was a review, said that the song is very moody with a vocally powerful, particularly memorable break out of the Walt Disney mold. Trey M. of Rickey comments that "5:15" is a great song and has a hip-hop rock vibe. He also commented "Enchants the listener from when the beat kicks in. Mendler delivers her lines in a spooky fashion. This song would sound great on a soundtrack to some type of film". Kai of the magazine Embrace You commented that the instruments essences are all carefully composed to convey her emotions, and the song is lovely, sweet and an exceptional number. He also said that "Bridgit's voice is as sweet as honey; her vocals complement the passion filled words perfectly. I can't stress enough on how good these songs are written". Xinhau of Spin or Bin Music was positive and commented that "5:15" is a really cute song.

Abhijith Asok of Music Perk said the song is good to be heard anywhere and that simplicity is the great element to love it. He also commented: "Mendler has sung it beautifully enough. Her easy movement through the song is clear from the progress of the track. She has given the right stress at the right time with her voice, to eliminate any chance of that occurring". Guilherme Tintel to It Pop compared the instrumental song to "Mad About You" of Hooverphonic and said the song is really sad and it is very good. Hailey Sager of Musiq Tone said that Mendler has an amazing voice and "anyone with a traveling for work lifestyle" will love the song.

=== Chart performance ===
For the week ending October 27, 2012, the album version of "5:15" debuted at number 65 on the South Korean International Singles Chart, making it Mendler's fifth song to chart in the country.

== Live performances ==
On October 26, 2012 Mendler performed the acoustic version on her official Vevo account for the special VEVO Lift. She also performed the song on Good Morning America on November 14, 2012. On January 31, 2013, Mendler performed the song on a Yahoo! Music web show. On April 23, she performed the song in the United Kingdom on MTV Live. She also sang a piece of the song on MTV Push. On July 31, the Grammy Academy released a video of "5:15" in an exclusive intimate performance for 'Grammy HQ' with "Hurricane", "Ready or Not" and an interview.

She has performed "5:15" on all dates of her tours, Live in Concert and Summer Tour.

== Credits and personnel ==
Credits for the album version of "5:15" are adapted from Hello My Name Is... liner notes.

- Bridgit Mendler – vocals, songwriter, background vocals
- Emanuel "Eman" Kiriakou – Songwriter, Bass, Guitar, Keyboards, producer, Programming, Ukulele
- Priscilla Renea – Songwriter
- Andrew "Goldstein" Goldstein – Songwriter, Bass, Guitar, Keyboards, producer, Programming
- Jai Marlon – Keyboards, producer, Programming, String Arrangements, Strings, Synthesizer, Whistle
- Jeremiah Olvera – Mixing Assistant
- David Ryan – Guitar
- Phil Shaouy – Guitar
- Donnell Shawn Butler – Background vocals
- Donnell Shawn – Background vocals
- Spencer Lee – Background vocals
- Freddy Wexler – Keyboards, Producer, String Arrangements, Strings, Synthesizer, Vocal Producer, Whistle
- Pat Thrall – Editing
- Jens Koerkemeier – Editing, Engineer
- Chris Gehringer – Mastering
- Serban Ghenea – Mixing

== Charts ==
Chart (2012)	Peak position
South Korea (Gaon International Chart)	65
