= Pell (musician) =

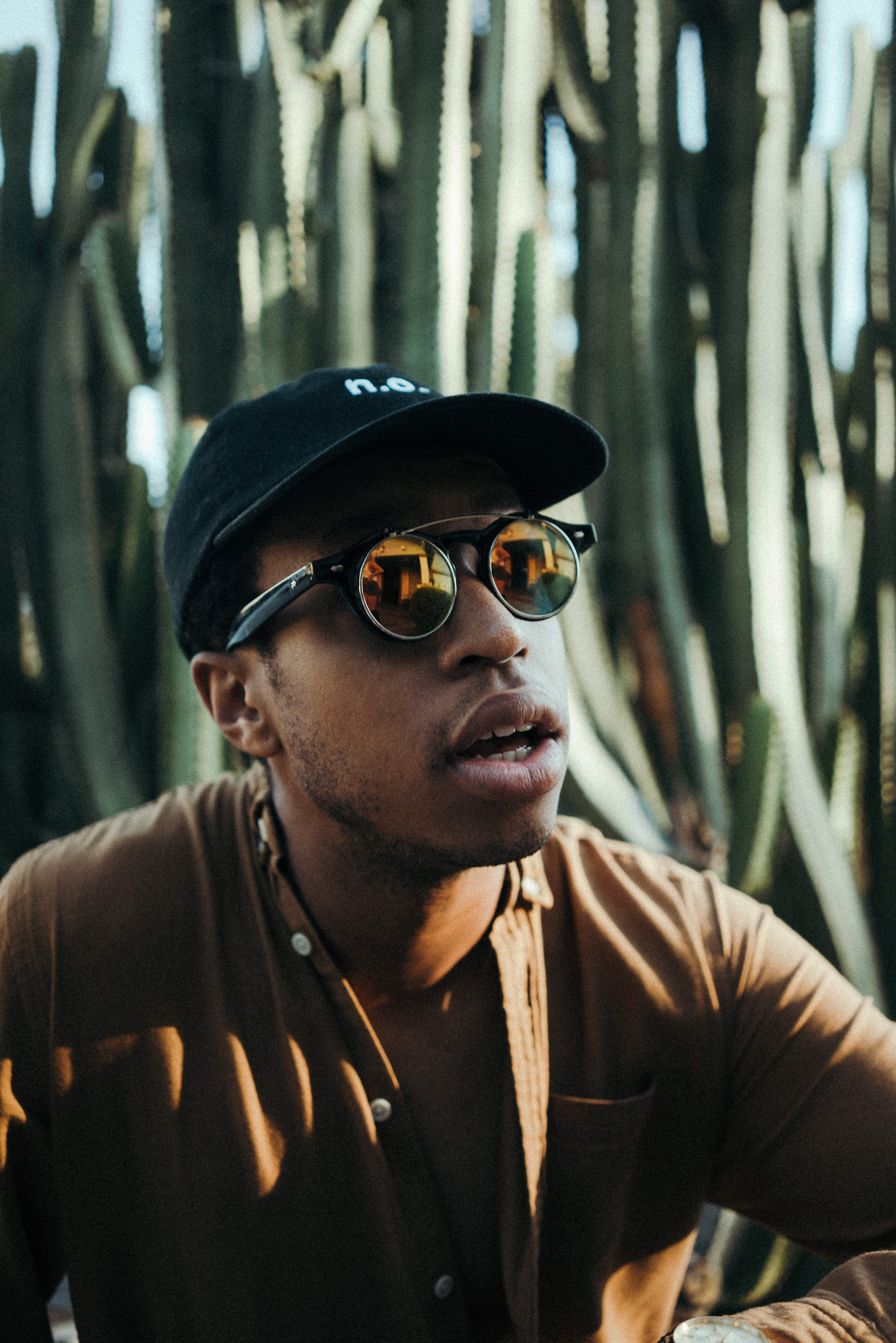
- Pell in 2016, shot by Nolan Feldpausch

Background information
- Also known as: Pell
- Born: Jared Pellerin; May 29, 1992 (age 34); New Orleans, Louisiana, U.S.
- Genres: Hip hop
- Occupations: Rapper; singer; songwriter; record producer
- Years active: 2013– Present
- Labels: PellYeah, LLC / Fontana Ultra Music / glbl wrmng
- Website: pellyeah.com

Jared Pellerin (born May 29, 1992), known professionally as Pell, is an American rapper, singer, songwriter, and producer.

His track, "Eleven:11", was remixed by G-Eazy and released to the public on May 20, 2015, under the new title, "Got It Like That (Eleven:11 Remix)". The track gained over 7 million plays on Spotify. Pell released his first full-length LP, LIMBO, on November 6, 2015, in partnership with Dave Sitek's label, Federal Prism. He is currently with the group Glbl Wrmng.

== Musical career ==
Following Hurricane Katrina, Pell moved from New Orleans to Jackson, Mississippi, with his mother. While sharing his grandmother's 2-bedroom home with 10 of his family members, Pell found his beat machine to be a way to make friends and connect with people in his new environment. It was the confidence he built from tinkering with his beat machine, and learning about music from his brother, former NFL player Micah Pellerin, that led him to begin rapping and performing alongside his friends at St. Joseph Catholic School (Madison, Mississippi). He continued his musical pursuits throughout high school and into his days as a student at Mississippi State University, where he connected with Jacob Reed, his current manager.

After deciding to put his studies on hold and pursue music full-time, Pell released his first project, Floating While Dreaming, on May 20, 2014, which "earned praise as one of the top independent releases of the year". The project premiered via Complex (magazine) and has gained over 11 million streams as of February 2016.

Pell's first full-length project was LIMBO, which dropped on November 6, 2015. This gave him the platform to do his first headlining tour.

He continued his musical run by releasing the "girasoul" EP in partnership with Payday Records on December 8, 2017. The title plays off the Spanish word for "sunflower" and showcased Pell's knack for experimentation with sound to create a soulful experience.

== Discography ==
=== Projects ===
Year	Title	Type
May 20, 2014	Floating While Dreaming	Mixtape
November 6, 2015	LIMBO	EP
June 22, 2019	‘’Gravity’’	LP
February 21, 2019	‘’glbl wrmng, vol. 1’’	LP
September 3, 2021	‘’Floating While Dreaming II’’	LP

=== Singles ===
Release date	Song title	Type
July 16, 2013	"Ocean View 2.0"	Single
August 26, 2014	"Runaway"	Single
November 4, 2014	"The Never" (featuring LV Baby)	Single
July 16, 2013	"Ocean View 2.0"	Single
March 24, 2015	"Runaway" (featuring White Sea) [Remix]	Single
May 20, 2015	"Got It Like That" (featuring G-Eazy) [Eleven:11 Remix]	Single
August 17, 2015	"Vanilla Sky"	Single
September 18, 2015	"Café Du Monde"	Single
October 8, 2015	"Queso"	Single
October 22, 2015	"Almighty Dollar"	Single
December 25, 2015	"Pretty Things"	Single
January, 2016	"In The Morning" (featuring Stephen, Caleborate)	Single
July 7, 2016	"Show Out"	Single
July 7, 2016	"Basic Beach"	Single
September 7, 2016	"All In A Day's Work" (featuring brandUn DeShay)	Single
March 17, 2017	"Can't Bring This Down" (with Bridgit Mendler)	Single

== Tours ==
Long-Run
Title	Billing	Location	Year
Yonas - The Up All Night Tour	Support	North America	Spring 2014
G-Eazy - From The Bay To The Universe Tour	Support	North America	Fall 2014
Kindness (musician) North American Tour	Support	North America	Spring 2015
Kehlani - You Should Be Here Tour	Support	North America	Summer 2015
The Only In Your Dreams Tour	Headliner	North America	Spring 2016
Tank and The Bangas Green Balloon Tour	Support	North America	Fall 2019

Festivals
Name	Location	Year
SXSW	Austin, TX	Spring 2014
Buku Music + Arts Project	New Orleans, LA	Spring 2015
SXSW	Austin, TX	Spring 2015
Lollapalooza	Chicago, IL	Summer 2015
Reading & Leeds	England	Summer 2015
SXSW	Austin, TX	Spring 2016
Hangout Music Festival	Gulf Shores, AL	Summer 2016
Firefly Music Festival	Dover, DE	Summer 2016
Pemberton Music Festival	Pemberton, BC	Summer 2016
Lollapalooza (with Big Gigantic)	Chicago, IL	Summer 2016
Forecastle Festival	Louisville, KY	Summer 2017
Soundset Music Festival	Falcon Heights, MN	Spring 2018
Jazz Fest	New Orleans, LA	Spring 2022
