= Let's Build Something to Break =

Studio album by After Midnight Project
- Released: August 11, 2009
- Recorded: Foxy Studios; The Village Recorder (Los Angeles, California)
- Genre: Alternative rock; alternative metal; post-grunge
- Length: 41:06
- Label: Universal Motown
- Producer: John Feldmann

After Midnight Project chronology
The Becoming (2007)	Let's Build Something to Break (2009)	You Belong (2011)

Singles from Let's Build Something to Break
- 1. "Take Me Home" Released: May 12, 2009

Professional ratings
Review scores
Source	Rating
AllMusic	3/5 stars

Let's Build Something to Break is the debut full-length album by American rock band, After Midnight Project. It was released on August 11, 2009 by Universal Motown Records. The album was produced by producer and Goldfinger frontman, John Feldmann.

"Take Me Home" is the first single off the album. That track, along with "The Real Thing" and "The Becoming", were previously released on their EP The Becoming. "Take Me Home" was also featured during the end credits of the 2006 video game Prey.

== Track listing ==
All tracks written by Jason Evigan except where noted

1. "Backlit Medley" – 3:43
2. "The Becoming" – 3:32
3. "Scream for You" – 3:07
4. "Take Me Home" – 3:45
5. "More to Live For" – 3:49
6. "Gone Too Long" – 4:15
7. "Hollywood" – 3:02
8. "The Real Thing" – 3:50 (Jason Evigan and John Feldmann)
9. "Come On Come On" – 2:57 (Jason Evigan and Spencer Bastian)
10. "Fighting My Way Back" – 4:09 (Jason Evigan and Zac Maloy)
11. "The Criminal" – 5:11 (Jason Evigan and John Feldmann)

== Personnel ==
- Jason Evigan – vocals, piano, guitar, bouzouki
- Spencer Bastian – guitar
- Danny Morris – drums
- TJ Armstrong – bass, vocals
- Christian Meadows – guitar

=== Additional musicians ===
- John Feldmann – percussion
- Matt Appleton – guitar ("Gone Too Long"); trumpet, trombone, baritone sax, ukulele ("The Criminal")
- Kyle Moorman – guitar ("The Real Thing", "Backlit Medley")
- Jon Nicholson – big drums ("The Real Thing", "Take Me Home")
- Justin Rubinstein – accordion ("The Criminal")
- John Feldmann, Matt Appleton, Spencer Bastian, Andrew Clore, Amy Feldmann, Victoria Janzen, Christian Paul Meadows, Danny Morris, Jess Neilson – additional vocals
