= You Belong (EP) =

EP by After Midnight Project
- Released: 2011
- Genre: Alternative rock
- Label: Self-released

After Midnight Project chronology
Let's Build Something to Break (2009)	You Belong (2011)

You Belong is an EP released by American rock band After Midnight Project. It was released on April 1, 2011.

The first single "Hourglass" was first released on KROQ-FM on February 27, 2011.

== Track listing ==
1. "You Belong" (1:04)
2. "Fire in the Sky" (3:04)
3. "Let Go" (3:26)
4. "Hourglass" (3:13)
5. "Keep My Feet on the Ground" (3:47)
6. "Open Door" (2:03)
7. "Beautiful World" (3:29)
8. "The Otherside" (3:17)

== Personnel ==
- Jason Evigan – vocals, programming, guitar
- Spencer Bastian – guitar
- Ryan Folden – drums
- Christian Meadows – guitar
