= Demo Taped =

American singer-songwriter

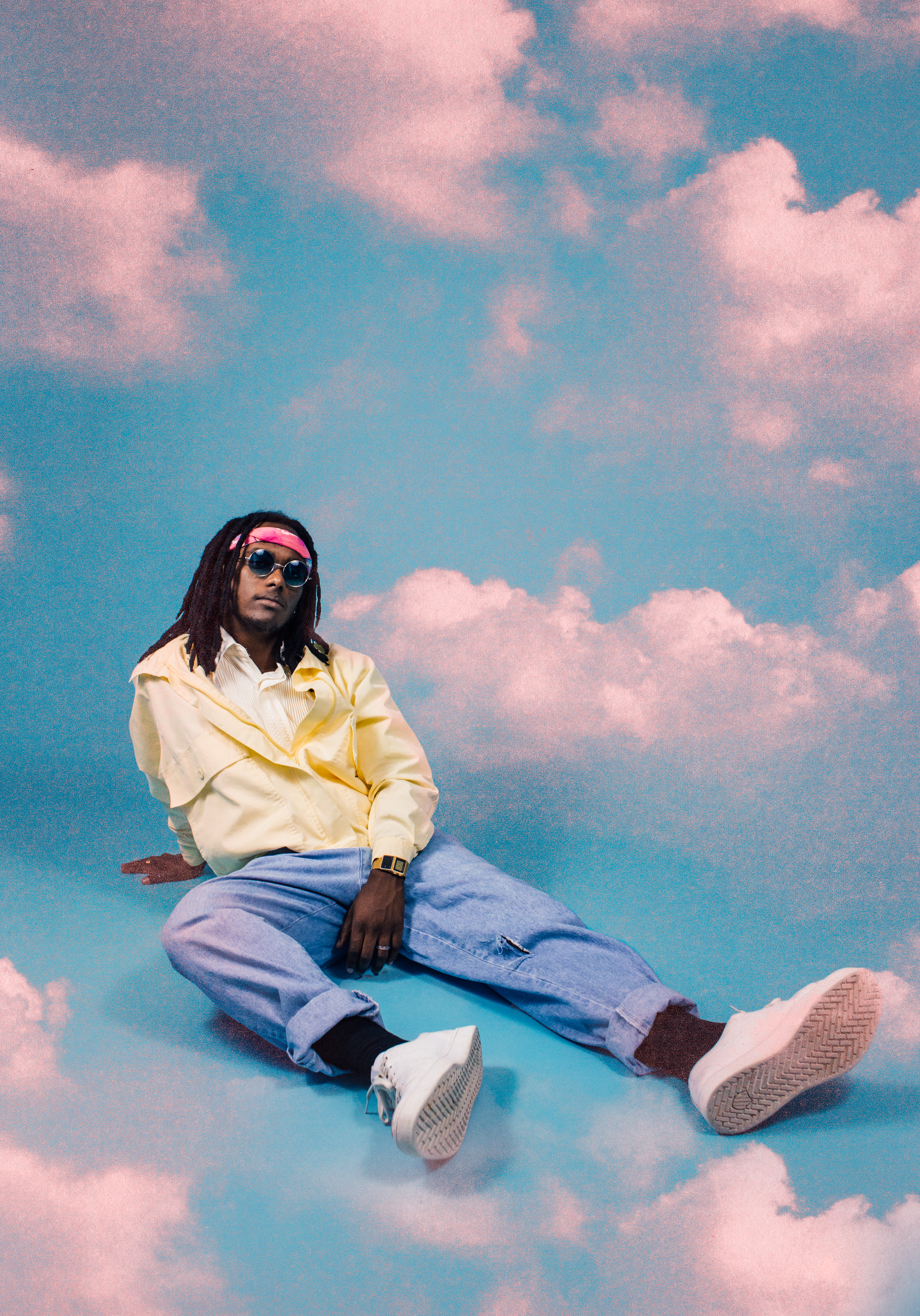
- Demo Taped 2017

Background information
- Born: Adam Alexander; 1998 (age 27–28); Atlanta, Georgia, United States
- Genre: electronic pop
- Occupations: singer; songwriter
- Years active: 2015–present
- Label: 300

Adam Alexander, professionally known as Demo Taped, is a singer-songwriter from Atlanta, Georgia, known for his single "Game On."

== Background ==
=== Early life and influences ===
A native of Atlanta, Demo Taped started taking piano lessons at age 4 and began writing his own songs at age 7. His father, a bass player, introduced him to many genres and musicians at a young age, and credits his parents as being his main influence in his music career. He started using GarageBand to create music tracks with his written lyrics.

Other musical influences include Herbie Hancock Spazzkid, Flying Lotus, Daedelus, Nosaj Thing, Baths, and Tokimonsta. Demo Taped has also been compared to Jai Paul, one of his major influences. In an interview with Sound of Boston, Taped described his music as "pop, it's electronic riffs, I guess I’d say it's electronic with many other elements built in. I never want to stop expanding and experimenting and do everything I can to continue to bend genres in the future."

=== Career ===
Demo Taped released his debut three-song EP "Heart" in early 2015. In June 2015, he released another single titled "Not Enough." In March 2016, he released the single "Open Arms" with RKCB. In April 2016, he released a single titled "Game On", his first under 300 Entertainment. He is featured in Karma Kid's single "Shapes, released in July 2016. The song, created by Karma Kid and sent to Demo Taped, allowed him to use "harmonies to fill in spaces."

Demo Taped was featured on the Pigeons and Planes No Ceiling showcase at SXSW, marking his first live performance.

Throughout 2016, he toured with NAO in the United Kingdom and Wet in the United States. Demo Taped also remixed "Atlantis" by Bridgit Mendler, released in September 2016.

In December 2016, he released the single "Stay (featuring Amber Mark)" under 300 Entertainment. The song "Insecure" was released in September 2017. The single "Pack of Gum" was released in November 2017. In September 2018, he released the single "Everyone Else" which features Jaira Burns.

== Discography ==
- Heart EP (2015)
- "Not Enough" (single) 2015
- "Game On" (single) 2016
- "Open Arms" feat. RKCB (single) 2016
- "Stay (feat. Amber Mark)" (single) 2016
- "Insecure" (single) 2017
- "Pack of Gum" (single) 2017
- "Everyone Else" featuring Jaira Burns (single) 2018

=== As featured artist ===
- "Shapes" by Karma Kid feat. Demo Taped (single) 2016

=== Remixes ===
Year	Song	Artist
2016	"Atlantis"	Bridgit Mendler
2017	"Radio"	Sylvan Esso
2017	"Kick Jump Twist"	Sylvan Esso
