= The Becoming (EP) =

EP by After Midnight Project
- Released: 2007
- Genre: Alternative rock; post-grunge
- Label: Self-released
- Producer: Jason Evigan; Evan A. Richardson

After Midnight Project chronology
After Midnight Project (2005)	The Becoming (2007)	Let's Build Something to Break (2009)

The Becoming is an EP released by American rock band, After Midnight Project. It was released in 2007.

This album caught the attention of Universal Motown and eventually led to the band being signed by them. The tracks, "Take Me Home", "The Real Thing", and "The Becoming" are being released on the band's upcoming full-length, Let's Build Something to Break, with "Take Me Home" being the first single off the album. "Take Me Home" has reached number 28 on the U.S. Alternative Songs chart. The album itself has never charted.

== Track listing ==
No.	Title	Length
1.	"Take Me Home"	4:02
2.	"The Real Thing"	4:39
3.	"Digital Crush"	4:25
4.	"Words"	3:56
5.	"The Becoming"	4:50

== Personnel ==
- Jason Evigan – vocals, programming, guitar
- Spencer Bastian – guitar
- Dan Morris – drums
- TJ Armstrong – bass, vocals
- Christian Meadows – guitar
