= Can't Bring This Down =

Single by Bridgit Mendler featuring Pell
- Released: March 17, 2017
- Recorded: January 2017
- Genre: Alt pop; R&B
- Length: 3:36
- Label: Black Box
- Songwriters: Bridgit Mendler; Jared Thomas Pellerin; Spencer Bastian
- Producers: Spencer Bastian; Mischa Chillak

Bridgit Mendler singles chronology
"Temperamental Love" (2017)	"Can't Bring This Down" (2017)	"Diving" (2017)

Music video
- "Can't Bring This Down" on YouTube

"Can't Bring This Down" is a single by American recording artist Bridgit Mendler, featuring rapper and musician Pell. It was released digitally on March 17, 2017 via Black Box and has been described as a smooth R&B song.

== Music video ==
The visual for "Can't Bring This Down" was directed by Vladimir Sepetov. It contains "soothing, psychedelic visuals". The music video was released on May 12, 2017.

== Track listing ==
- Digital download
1. "Can't Bring This Down" (featuring Pell) – 3:36
- Blended Babies remix
1. "Can't Bring This Down (Blended Babies remix)" (featuring Pell) – 3:32

== Release history ==
Region	Release date	Format	Ref.
Various	March 17, 2017	Digital download	
