= Micah Pellerin =

American football player (born 1988)

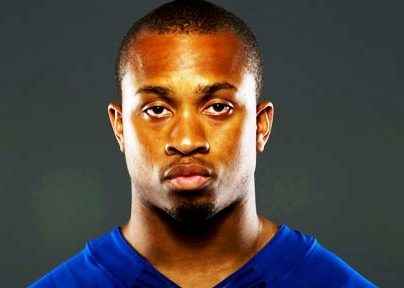
- Pellerin in 2014

No. 32, 31
- Position: Cornerback

Personal information
- Born: November 23, 1988 (age 37); New Orleans, Louisiana, U.S.
- Listed height: 6 ft 1 in (1.85 m)
- Listed weight: 200 lb (91 kg)

Career information
- High school: St. Joseph Catholic
- College: Hampton
- NFL draft: 2012: undrafted

Career history
- Indianapolis Colts (2012)*; Green Bay Packers (2012)*; Dallas Cowboys (2012–2013); Tennessee Titans (2013); Dallas Cowboys (2014); Cleveland Browns (2015)*
- * Offseason or practice squad member only

Awards and highlights
- All MEAC (2011)

Career NFL statistics
- Games played: 8
- Total tackles: 2
- Stats at Pro Football Reference

Micah Paul Pellerin (born November 23, 1988) is an American former professional football player who was a cornerback in the National Football League (NFL) for the Dallas Cowboys and Tennessee Titans. He was signed as an undrafted free agent by the Indianapolis Colts in 2012. He played college football for the Hampton Pirates.

== Early life ==
Born in New Orleans, Louisiana, Pellerin attended Metairie Park Country Day School in the suburb of Metairie for his first two years of high school before his family relocated to Jackson, Mississippi following Hurricane Katrina.

After relocating to Jackson, Pellerin enrolled at St. Joseph Catholic School in the suburb of Madison. He played as a wide receiver, wing back and defensive back, helping his team to a first round appearance in the state playoffs in 2006.

Pellerin finished his senior season with 24 receptions for 513 yards, 6 touchdowns, 26 carries for 281 yards, 56 tackles and 5 interceptions. He received District 6-2A All-District and was team Offensive MVP honors.

He also lettered in track, winning the District 6-2A championship in the triple jump, long jump, and 400 metres as a senior. He was all-state in band, playing the flute.

== College career ==
Pellerin accepted a football scholarship from the University of Southern Mississippi. As a redshirt freshman, he appeared in 11 games as a backup defensive back, making 5 tackles, one forced fumble and one recovery. He transferred to Hampton University during his sophomore season.

As a sophomore, he appeared in 11 games with seven starts, collecting 32 tackles (eighth on the team), 2 tackles for loss, one interception, 8 pass breakups and one fumble recovery.

As a junior, he started 10 out of 11 games, finishing the 2010 season ranked fourth in FCS and first in the MEAC with 16 total passes defended. He also posted 41 tackles and 2 interceptions.

As a senior, he started 11 games, tying for first in the FCS and was first in the MEAC with 19 passes defended. He also had 51 tackles (seventh on the team), 4.5 tackles for loss and tied for second in MEAC with four interceptions.

He appeared in 44 games with 28 starts at Hampton, registering 124 tackles (80 solo), 7 interceptions, 43 passes defensed and 36 pass break-ups. He graduated from Hampton in May 2011, receiving a B.S. degree in Finance. He was selected to participate in the 2012 East-West Shrine Game, and he was one of two players from historically black colleges invited to participate in the 2012 NFL Combine.

== Professional career ==
=== Indianapolis Colts ===
Pellerin was signed as an undrafted free agent by the Indianapolis Colts after the 2012 NFL draft on April 30. He was waived to make room for cornerback Korey Lindsey on May 31.

=== Green Bay Packers ===
On June 1, 2012, he was claimed off waivers by the Green Bay Packers. He was released on August 24.

=== Dallas Cowboys (first stint) ===
On December 11, 2012, he was signed to the Dallas Cowboys practice squad. In January 2013, he signed a futures contract. By having a 43.8% completion percentage allowed, Pellerin acquitted himself well during the preseason. He gave up a touchdown in the Hall of Fame game, allowed two completions on eight targets and registered his lone pass defensed of the pre-season against the Cincinnati Bengals in his four subsequent preseason appearances (85 snaps). He was released on August 31 and re-signed by the practice squad. He was promoted to the active roster in week nine, to provide depth after Morris Claiborne suffered a hamstring injury. He appeared in 2 games until being cut on November 21, with the expectation of his returning to the practice squad after clearing waivers.

=== Tennessee Titans ===
On November 22, 2013, he was claimed off waivers by the Tennessee Titans. He finished the remainder of the season on the active roster. He was released on August 25, 2014.

=== Dallas Cowboys (second stint) ===
On August 31, 2014, he was signed to the Cowboys' practice squad. On November 9, he was promoted to the active roster for three games due to injuries to cornerbacks Morris Claiborne and Tyler Patmon. He was released on December 8 and spent the balance of the season on the practice squad.

=== Cleveland Browns ===
On January 20, 2015, he signed a one-year free agent contract with the Cleveland Browns. He was released on July 28.

=== Microsoft ===
In November 2022, Pellerin joined Microsoft as a Business Development Manager on the Microsoft Digital Natives Pursuits team, working with late-stage startups and high-growth tech companies, driving strategic initiatives resulting in Microsoft Azure partnerships.

== Personal life ==
Pellerin's younger brother, Jared Pellerin, is a hip-hop artist performing under the name Pell. He later earned Master of Business Administration from Kelley School of Business at Indiana University Bloomington in 2019.
