= St. Joseph Catholic School (Madison, Mississippi) =

Saint Joseph Catholic School
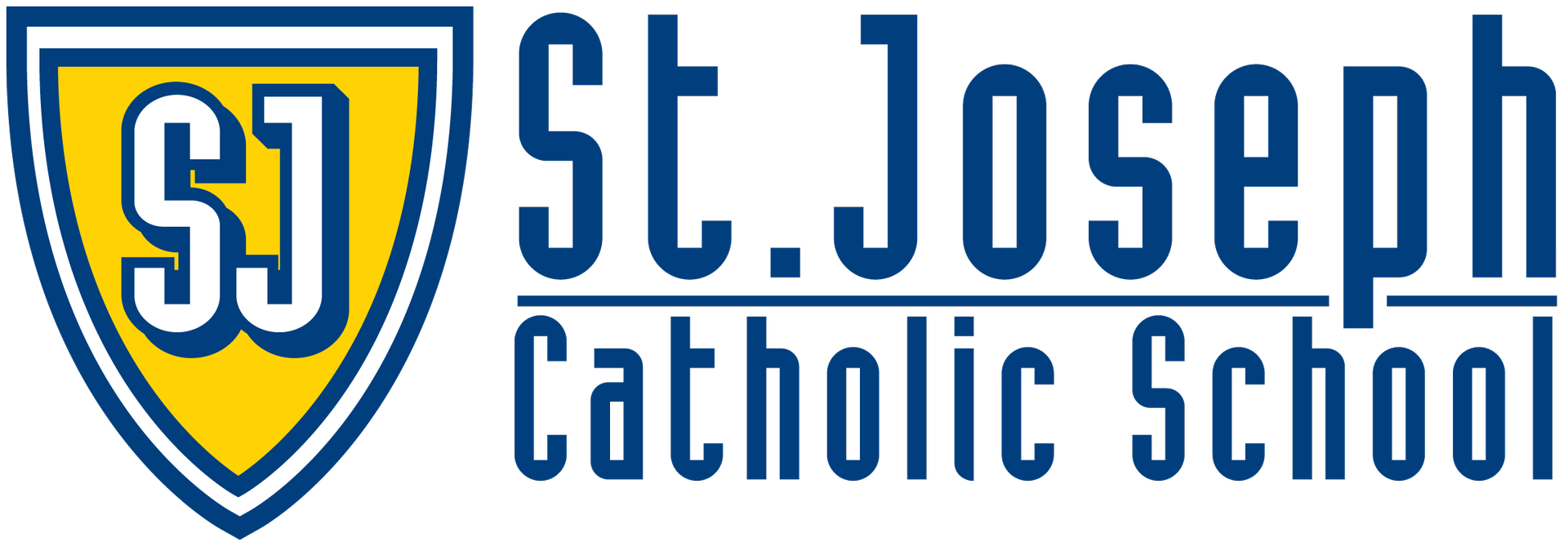

Location
- 308 New Mannsdale Road; Madison, Mississippi 39110; United States; 32°28′25″N 90°8′48″W

Information
- Type: Private, Coeducational
- Motto: Ad Deum Per Scientium (To God, Through Knowledge)
- Religious affiliation: Roman Catholic
- Established: 1870
- Founders: Sisters of Mercy
- School district: Roman Catholic Diocese of Jackson
- Principal: Trey Bailey
- Grades: 7–12
- Colors: Blue and Gold
- Team name: Bruins
- Accreditation: Southern Association of Colleges and Schools
- Newspaper: The Bear Facts
- Yearbook: The Shield
- Affiliation: National Catholic Educational Association
- Website: www.stjoebruins.com

Saint Joseph Catholic School (also known as St. Joe) is a Catholic high school located in Madison, Mississippi. The school was founded by the Sisters of Mercy in 1870.

== History ==
1870–1965: St. Joseph Catholic School, founded by the Sisters of Mercy in 1870, was located at Amite Street in Jackson from 1870 until 1965.

1965–1998: In 1965, the school relocated to Boling Street where it remained until 1996. It had a two-year temporary home at Holly Drive, adjacent to St. Richard Catholic Church.

1998: St. Joseph School moved to its present location on New Mannsdale Road, near the intersection of Highway 463 and I-55 in Madison.

== Accreditation and Membership ==
- St. Joseph Catholic School is accredited by the Southern Association of Colleges and Schools.
- St. Joseph Catholic School is a member of the National Catholic Education Association and the Mid-South Association of Independent Schools.

== Academics ==
Note: **Must Have Guidance Approval *Summer School Option Curriculum - Middle School

7th Grade	8th Grade
Religion	Religion
Literature	Literature
English or **English Honors	English or **English Honors
Pre-Algebra or **Pre-Algebra Honors	Transition to Algebra or **Algebra I Honors
Science	Science
Social Studies	Social Studies
Keyboarding/PE/Music or **Resource	PE/Dance & Int. Latin/Visual Arts or 8th Grade Band or Resource

Curriculum - High School

9th Grade	10th Grade	11th Grade	12th Grade
Religion	Religion	Religion	Religion
English or **English Honors	English or **English Honors	English or **English Honors or **AP English	English or **English Honors or **AP English
Algebra I or **Geometry Honors	Geometry or **Algebra II Honors	Algebra II or **Trig Honors / Pre-Cal Honors or **Probability & Statistics / Adv. Algebra	Math
Geography/Fine Arts	World History or **World History Honors	U.S. History or **U.S. History Honors or **AP US History	U.S. Government & Economics
Computer Application (1 semester) & Health	Chemistry or **Chemistry Honors	Science	Science
Biology I or **Biology Honors	Foreign Language	**Personal Finance (1 semester), *Public Speaking (1 semester)	
Spanish I or Latin I or French I Art I/II or Theatre I or Choral Music or Band	Elective (1 unit) or **Compensatory Reading II	Elective (1 unit) or Foreign Language	Electives (3 units)

Graduation Requirements
In order to graduate from St. Joseph Catholic School, each student must complete a minimum number of Carnegie units.
(28 Carnegie Units)
4 units of Religion (9, 10, 11, 12; required each year student is enrolled at St. Joe)
4 units of English (9, 10, 11, 12)
4 units of Mathematics (9, 10, 11, 12)
4 units of Science (9, 10, 11, 12)
4 units of Social Studies (9, 10, 11, 12)
2 units of Foreign Language
1 unit of Fine Arts
½ unit of Public Speaking
½ unit of Computer applications
½ unit of Comprehensive Health
½ unit of Personal Finance
½ unit of Physical Education
Demonstrate Keyboarding proficiency

The remaining units are Electives. Electives and required courses must add to graduation requirements listed above. Students are expected to carry seven (7) units each year. Students must pass ALL classes each year or attend a recognized summer program. Service Requirement of 25 hours are required each year of high school. Yearly attendance at grade level retreats is also required.

Religion Classes
Grade 7 - Salvation History Sacraments; signs of Christ's continuing presence
Grade 8 - The growth of Christianity The commandments/morality
Grade 9 - Understanding Catholic Christianity and Hebrew Scripture
Grade 10 - New Testament & Christology
Grade 11 - A History of the Catholic Church and Christian Justice
Grade 12 - World Religions and Christian Lifestyles

Masses
School masses are celebrated on campus on a regular basis by the Catholic priests of the Jackson-Metro Area.

== Notable alumni ==
- John Bond, high school football coach
- Micah Pellerin, former NFL player
- Teresa Sullivan, President Emerita at University of Virginia

== See also ==
- List of private schools in Mississippi
