= Hello My Name Is... =

Studio album by Bridgit Mendler
- Released: October 22, 2012
- Recorded: September–November 2011
- Genres: Pop; R&B
- Length: 42:09
- Label: Hollywood
- Producers: Dreamlab; Andrew Goldstein; Emanuel Kiriakou; Jai Marlon; Freddy Wexler

Bridgit Mendler chronology
Hello My Name Is... (2012)	Nemesis (2016)

Singles from Hello My Name Is...
- 1. "Ready or Not" Released: August 7, 2012; 2. "Hurricane" Released: February 12, 2013; 3. "Top of the World" Released: July 17, 2013

Hello My Name Is... is the only studio album by the American singer and songwriter Bridgit Mendler, released on October 22, 2012, through Hollywood Records. Mendler began planning the project in 2011 and co-wrote all of its tracks. The first single of the album, "Ready or Not", premiered on August 3, 2012, and was released as a digital download on August 7. The song debuted and peaked at number seven on the UK Singles Chart and reached number 49 on the US Billboard Hot 100 chart.

The album debuted at number thirty on the US Billboard 200 and at number 20 on the US Billboard Digital Albums chart with over 12,000 pure album sales. It also charted at number 17 on the Polish Albums Chart, its first appearance on a chart outside the US.

She has used three more songs to promote her album, the singles "Hurricane" and "Top of the World", and the promotional single "Forgot to Laugh". The album received mainly positive reviews from music critics, who praised Mendler's vocals and songwriting skills, but criticized the songs for sounding too alike and lacking direction.

== Background and release ==
Mendler originally announced that her album would be released in September 2012. It was also announced that her single, "Ready or Not", would premiere on children's radio on August 3, 2012, be available to purchase on August 7, 2012, and impact top 40 radio on August 20, 2012. The song impacted the mainstream radio on August 21, 2012. The release date of the album was later changed to October 22, 2012. The track listing and album cover were announced on August 20, 2012. The re-release of the album for Japan features an alternative album cover, and was released on February 17, 2014.

== Composition ==
Mendler described the album as authorial and pop, with R&B, jazz and funk influences.

== Promotion ==
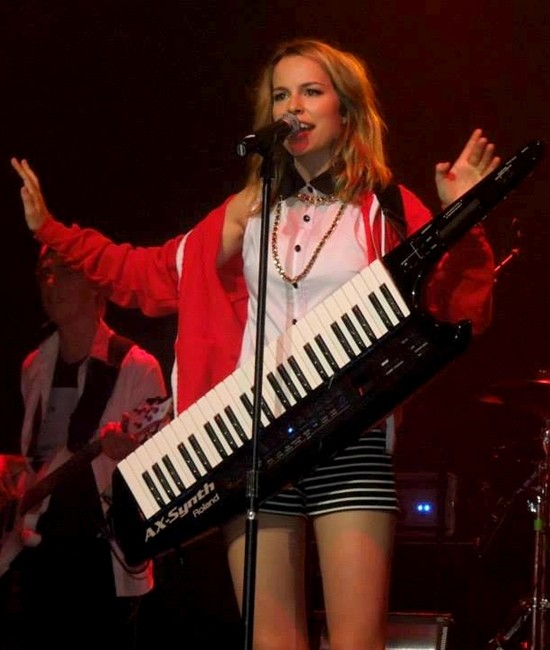
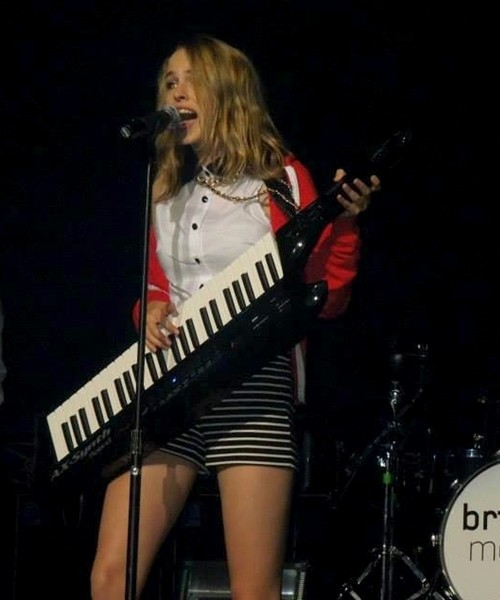
Mendler performing in Kansas City in July 2013

On October 19, 2012, Mendler performed "Ready or Not" and "Hurricane" on Off the Charts. On October 20, she performed "Ready or Not" on the Radio Disney and Disney Channel show Total Access. On November 14, 2012, Mendler sang "Ready or Not" and "5:15" on Good Morning America on November 14, 2012. Mendler performed the song on Live! with Kelly and Michael on November 15, 2012. The first single also was performed on The X Factor semi-final results show on December 13, 2012. On March 11, 2013, Mendler performed "Hurricane" on Live! with Kelly and Michael. On April 27, Mendler performed "Hurricane" on the 2013 Radio Disney Music Awards. This was Mendler's first time singing at an awards show. Mendler performed on The Morning Show and on New Music Live in Toronto, Canada. "Hurricane" was also performed on Disneyland Resort on October 12, 2012.

In May, she traveled to Argentina to record a cameo appearance in the Latin telenovela show Violetta and sang "Hurricane" with the cast. On May 17, Mendler performed the song on MTV Push. On May 30, the CBBC's show Blue Peter also broadcast a previously recorded performance of "Hurricane". On June 5, she performed "Hurricane" on The Ellen DeGeneres Show after an interview. On June 20, Mendler traveled to the United Kingdom to promote the single on BBC Radio 1. The next day, Mendler performed "Hurricane" on Daybreak, and on June 23 she promoted the song on Sunday Brunch but didn't sing it. On July 15, Mendler performed "Hurricane" on the FOX morning talk show Good Day L.A. On July 23, Mendler traveled to Singapore to promote the song on the radio. In the same week, she went to Australia to perform the song on The Today Show on July 30, and on NovaFM on July 31. On July 31, the Grammy Academy released a video of "Hurricane" in an exclusive intimate performance for 'Grammy HQ' with "5:15", "Ready or Not", and an interview.

=== Tours ===
To promote the album, Mendler embarked on her debut headlining concert tour entitled Bridgit Mendler: Live in Concert. The tour played 25 shows starting on August 25, 2012, and ending on January 19, 2013. The tour played at music festivals and state fairs in the United States and Canada; it became a major success with critics, selling out many dates in the United States. She continued to promote the album with her 2013 Summer Tour. The tour began on June 16, 2013, in Burlington, Iowa, and ended on September 21, 2013, in Puyallup, Washington.

=== VEVO Lift series ===
In April 2013, Mendler recorded a series of videos at the request of VEVO for the special VEVO Lift. It featured intimate acoustic performances recorded in the VEVO Studios and interviews about the album.

== Singles ==
"Ready or Not" is the first single from the album. It premiered on August 3, 2012, and was released as a digital download on August 7, 2012. The song was written by Mendler, Emanuel "Eman" Kiriakou, and Evan "Kidd" Bogart. The song received positive reviews from music critics, praising the song's unique sound and Mendler's vocals, which have been compared to Carly Rae Jepsen and Demi Lovato. The song debuted at number 98 and peaked at number 49 on the US Billboard Hot 100 chart, debuted at number 80 and peaked at number 48 on the Canadian Hot 100 chart, and debuted at number 14 and peaked at number 12 on the US Top Heatseekers chart. It also debuted at number 17 and peaked at number 12 on the New Zealand Singles Chart, becoming her first international top 20 hit. It sold 21,000 copies in its first week according to Luminate.

"Hurricane" was previously released as a promotional single to the iTunes Store for Single of the Week on October 22, 2012. It was later announced to be the second single and was officially released to radio on February 12, 2013. The song received positive reviews from music critics, praising Mendler's vocals and the song's reggae influence. Critics heavily praised Mendler's rapping skills, comparing them to Cher Lloyd and Lily Allen. The song debuted at number 194 on the South Korean International Singles Chart, making it her second song to chart in the country.

"Top of the World" was released as third single on July 17, 2013. The song was featured on the twelfth season of American Idol during the "Charlotte Auditions".

=== Promotional singles ===
"Forgot to Laugh" was first heard on October 4, 2012, via Idolator. It was then placed on Mendler's YouTube page the next day. Prior to being released as a single, the song had received positive reviews, saying that the song "is a shiny, guitar-driven pop-rock anthem, loaded with witty metaphors that would give Taylor Swift a run for her money" and concluded that "the sharp songcraft is all the more impressive given that Mendler co-wrote the track herself." According to MTV, it was produced by Emanuel "Eman" Kiriakou and Evan "Kidd" Bogart, the same people who produced "Ready or Not". Rachel Brodsky of MTV was also positive with her review, describing the song as "at once sunny and wise, and seems to revel in the friendly sass and punch of Cher Lloyd and the fast-talking know-how of Lily Allen".

== Critical reception ==
Professional ratings
Review scores
Source	Rating
AbsolutePunk	47%
AllMusic	3/5 stars
Common Sense Media	4/5 stars

The album has received mostly positive reviews from music critics. Tim Sendra of AllMusic was positive with his review, praising her "fine singing voice" and her "songwriting chops". He concluded by calling the album "an impressive debut from a singer who shows real talent and has every chance to break out of the Disney mold and do something all her own down the road." Jessica Dawson of Common Sense Media gave a positive review of the album and rated it four out of five stars, praising the songs' clean lyrics. However, hiddentrack of AbsolutePunk gave a mixed review and rated the album 47% out of 100% and was not sure "whether she wants to be the next Taylor Swift or Cher Lloyd or even Kesha." He also said that the album "really lacks any direction at all", but praised the lead single, "Ready or Not", describing it as "catchy" with "a big chorus, handclaps and fluffy lyrics that lack substance, but it works."

=== Accolades ===
Title	Year	Category	Work	Result	Ref.
PopCrush Awards	2012	About to Pop (Best song)	"Ready or Not"	Won	
Pop Dust Awards	2012	The 100 Best Songs of 2012	"Ready or Not"	9th	
Shorty Awards	2013	Best Song	"Ready or Not"	Nominated	
Radio Disney Music Awards	2013	Best Acoustic Performance	"Ready or Not"	Won	
Radio Disney Music Awards	2013	Best Music Video	"Ready or Not"	Nominated	
World Music Awards	2013	Best Song	"Ready or Not"	Nominated	
World Music Awards	2013	Best Video	"Ready or Not"	Nominated	
MTV Europe Music Awards	2013	Best Push	"Ready or Not"	Nominated	
PopBoard Awards	2013	Best Music Video	"Hurricane"	Won	
World Music Awards	2014	Best Video	"Ready or Not"	Nominated	
World Music Awards	2014	Best Song	"Ready or Not"	Nominated	

== Commercial performance ==
The album debuted at number 30 on the US Billboard 200 chart and at number 30 on the US Billboard Digital Albums chart. According to Billboard and Soundscan, the album sold over 12,000 copies in its first week of release.

== Track listing ==
Hello My Name Is... track listing
No.	Title	Writer(s)	Producer(s)	Length
1.	"Ready or Not"	Bridgit Mendler; Emanuel Kiriakou; Evan Bogart; Thom Bell; William Hart	Kiriakou; Andrew Goldstein	3:21
2.	"Forgot to Laugh"	Mendler; Kiriakou; Bogart	Kiriakou; Goldstein	3:09
3.	"Top of the World"	Mendler; Kiriakou; Jai Marlon; Laura Raia; David Ryan; Freddy Wexler	Kiriakou; Goldstein	3:28
4.	"Hurricane"	Mendler; Kiriakou; Bogart; Goldstein	Kiriakou; Goldstein	4:03
5.	"City Lights"	Mendler; Marlon; Ryan; Wexler	Marlon; Wexler	4:00
6.	"All I See Is Gold"	Mendler; Kiriakou; Goldstein; Priscilla Renea	Kiriakou; Goldstein	2:53
7.	"The Fall Song"	Mendler; Kiriakou; Bogart	Kiriakou; Goldstein	3:39
8.	"Love Will Tell Us Where to Go"	Mendler; Kiriakou; Marlon; Ryan; Wexler	Kiriakou; Goldstein; Marlon^{[a]}; Wexler^{[a]}	3:22
9.	"Blonde"	Mendler; Leah Haywood; Daniel Pringle	Dreamlab	3:08
10.	"Rocks at My Window"	Mendler; Kiriakou; Bogart; Goldstein	Kiriakou; Goldstein	3:12
11.	"5:15"	Mendler; Kiriakou; Renea; Goldstein	Kiriakou; Goldstein	3:55
12.	"Hold On for Dear Love"	Mendler; Donnell Shawn Butler; Wexler	Wexler	3:59
Total length:				42:09

Japanese edition
No.	Title	Writer(s)	Producer(s)	Length
13.	"Ready or Not" (DJ Mike D Remix Extended Mixshow)	Mendler; Kiriakou; Bogart; Goldstein; Bell; Hart	Kiriakou; Goldstein; Michael Diamond^{[b]}	3:35
Total length:				45:44

Japanese deluxe edition bonus track
No.	Title	Writer(s)	Producer(s)	Length
14.	"Quicksand"	Mendler; Kiriakou; Wexler	Wexler	3:21
Total length:				49:05

Spotify edition bonus track
No.	Title	Writer(s)	Producer(s)	Length
13.	"Ready or Not (Acoustic)"	Mendler; Kiriakou; Bogart; Bell; Hart	Kiriakou; Goldstein	3:30
Total length:				45:39

Digital deluxe edition bonus tracks
No.	Title	Writer(s)	Producer(s)	Length
13.	"We're Dancing"	Mendler; Josh Alexander; Billy Steinberg	Steinberg	3:10
14.	"Postcard"	Mendler; Toby Gad	Toby Gad	3:25
15.	"Quicksand"	Mendler; Kiriakou; Wexler	Wexler	3:21
Total length:				52:05

Japanese deluxe edition bonus DVD
No.	Title	Length
1.	"Ready or Not" (music video)
2.	"Hurricane" (music video)

Notes

- ^{[a]} denotes a co-producer.
- ^{[b]} signifies a remixer.

Sample credits

- "Ready or Not" contains the interpolation of "Ready or Not Here I Come (Can't Hide from Love)" by The Delfonics.

== Personnel ==
=== Musicians ===
- Bridgit Mendler – vocals
- Andrew Goldstein – guitars, bass, keyboards, programming, backing vocals
- Emanuel Kiriakou – guitars, bass, ukulele, keyboards, programming, backing vocals
- David Ryan – guitars
- Phil Shaouy – guitars
- Freddy Wexler – synthesizers
- Jai Marlon – synthesizers; string arrangement (track 3)
- Donnell Shawn Butler – backing vocals
- Spencer Lee – backing vocals
- Evan Bogart – backing vocals

=== Production ===
- Emanual Kiriakou – producer (tracks 1–4, 6–8, 10 and 11)
- Andrew Goldstein – producer (tracks 1–4, 6–8, 10 and 11)
- Jens Koerkemeier – recording, editing
- Pat Thrall – recording and editing assistance (tracks 6–8, 11)
- John Hanes – mix engineer
- Phil Seaford – assistant mix engineer
- Serban Ghenea – mixing
- Freddy Wexler – producer, recording (track 5, 12)
- Jai Marlon – producer (track 5)
- Dan Glashauser – recording (track 5, 12)
- Neal H. Pogue – mixing (track 5, 9, 12)
- Jeremiah Olvera – mixing (track 5, 9, 12)
- DreamLab – producer (track 9)
- Chris Gehringer – mastering

== Charts ==
=== Weekly charts ===
Chart (2012–2014)	Peak position
Argentinean Albums (CAPIF)	14
Australian Albums (ARIA)	58
French Albums (SNEP)	95
Polish Albums (ZPAV)	17
Spanish Albums (Promusicae)	26
UK Albums (OCC)	107
US Billboard 200	30
US Digital Albums (Billboard)	20

=== Year-end charts ===
Chart (2013)	Peak position
Argentinean Albums (CAPIF)	100

== Certifications ==
Region	Certification	Certified units/sales
Argentina (CAPIF)	Gold	20,000^{^}
New Zealand (RMNZ)	Gold	7,500^{‡}
^{^} Shipments figures based on certification alone.^{‡} Sales+streaming figures based on certification alone.

== Release history ==
Country	Date	Edition(s)	Label	Ref.
United States	October 22, 2012	Standard; deluxe	Hollywood	
Canada	October 23, 2012	Standard	Hollywood	
Australia	October 26, 2012	Standard	Hollywood	
New Zealand	October 26, 2012	Standard	Hollywood	
Argentina	February 19, 2013	Standard	Universal	
Brazil	February 26, 2013	Standard	Universal	
Spain	February 26, 2013	Standard	Universal	
United Kingdom	March 18, 2013	Standard; deluxe	Hollywood	
Italy	April 9, 2013	Standard	Universal	
Portugal	April 15, 2013	Standard	Universal	
Germany	July 19, 2013	Standard	Universal	
Turkey	July 15, 2013	Standard	Hollywood	
Japan	February 5, 2014	Japanese deluxe	Avex Music Creative	
