= Forgot to Laugh =

Promotional single by Bridgit Mendler

from the album Hello My Name Is...
- Released: October 4, 2012
- Recorded: 2011
- Genre: Pop
- Length: 3:09
- Label: Hollywood
- Songwriters: Bridgit Mendler; Emanuel Kiriakou; Evan Kidd Bogart; Andrew Goldstein
- Producers: Kiriakou; Goldstein

"Forgot to Laugh" is a song by American actress, singer, songwriter, musician and record producer, Bridgit Mendler, from her debut studio album, Hello My Name Is... (2012). It was written by Mendler, Emanuel Kiriakou, Evan Kidd Bogart, and Andrew Goldstein, with the production being handled by Kiriakou and Goldstein. The song was premiered on Idolator on October 4, 2012.

== Background ==
A midtempo pop song, "Forgot to Laugh" exhibits elements of pop rock and funk. The song's instrumentation includes slow-bouncing guitar, keyboard tones, and drums. Lyrically, the song suggests betrayal and contempt for an ex-boyfriend. Mendler's vocals span from the low note of D_{3} to the high note of F_{5}.

== Critical reception ==
Sam Lansky of Idolator said "[Forgot to Laugh] is a shiny, guitar-driven pop-rock anthem, loaded with witty metaphors that would give Taylor Swift a run for her money." and later claimed that the song has a "monster chorus." Kai of Embrace You Magazine stated "The track is well produced with a grungy electric guitar blending with a fierce bass and hard-hitting drums, and Mendler’s sassy vocals sound convincing the more the track takes off. The song’s ingenious verbiage is quite appealing, demonstrating the singer’s ability to incorporate humor in her songwriting and like the first track, pushes tension out the door." Common Sense Media claimed "Mendler shows her playful side by trying some pop-rapping, and she even demonstrates a little attitude with lyrics like 'I promise you'll be on your knees if you leave.'"

== Track listing ==
Digital download
No.	Title	Length
1.	"Forgot to Laugh"	3:09

== Credits and personnel ==
Credits for "Forgot to Laugh" are adapted from Hello My Name Is... liner notes.

- Bridgit Mendler – Vocals, songwriter, background vocals
- Emanuel Kiriakou – Songwriter, producer, keyboards, guitars, bass, programming
- Evan Kidd Bogart – Songwriter
- Andrew Goldstein – Songwriter, producer, keyboards, guitars, bass, programming
- Serban Ghenea – Mixing
- Jens Koerkemeier – Engineer, editing

== Release history ==
Region	Date	Format	Label	Ref.
United States	October 4, 2012	Streaming (Idolator premiere)	Hollywood	
United States	October 22, 2012	Digital download	Hollywood	
