= Hurricane (Bridgit Mendler song) =

2013 single by Bridgit Mendler

Single by Bridgit Mendler

from the album Hello My Name Is...
- Released: February 12, 2013
- Recorded: 2011
- Genre: Pop rap; R&B
- Length: 4:03
- Label: Hollywood
- Songwriters: Bridgit Mendler; Emanuel Kiriakou; Evan Kidd Bogart; Andrew Goldstein
- Producers: Emanuel Kiriakou; Andrew Goldstein

Bridgit Mendler singles chronology
"Ready or Not" (2012)	"Hurricane" (2013)	"Top of the World" (2013)

Music video
- "Hurricane" on YouTube

"Hurricane" is a song by American recording artist Bridgit Mendler, from her debut studio album, Hello My Name Is... (2012). The song was released as a promotional single to the iTunes Store as Single of the Week on October 22, 2012, and was later announced to be the second single from the album. On February 12, 2013, the song was released to Top 40 radio.

The song was praised by music critics but it missed the Billboard Hot 100 by one position, debuting and peaking at number one on the US Billboard Bubbling Under chart.

== Composition ==
"Hurricane" (2013)
A 24-second sample of Bridgit Mendler's "Hurricane".

"Hurricane" exhibits elements of rap, gospel and pop. Built on a beat and multi-tracked harmonies, the song's instrumentation includes slow-bouncing keyboard tones, and drums. The song was written by Mendler and American songwriters Emanuel Kiriakou, Evan Kidd Bogart, and Andrew Goldstein, and produced by Kiriakou and Goldstein. Lyrically, the song gives ode to a disaster love, as well as reconciliation and perseverance in love. Mendler's vocals span from the low note of F_{3} to the high note of F_{5}. In interview for Coup de Main Magazine, Mendler commented about recording a rap song for the first time. She said:

I loved recording... you know the rap in 'Hurricane'? That was pretty fun. It was very experimental for me, I haven’t done much rapping before. It was not a deliberate decision... we had written the song and I had come in to record it and then the guys were like: "Why don’t we just try rapping this part?". So I did and then it kind of just worked and we decided to keep it. So not intentional, but sometimes things just happen in the moment.

== Critical reception ==
The song was praised by the media. Tim Sendra of AllMusic said, "[Hurricane] has clever fairy tale lyrics and an impassioned vocal (and a sassy rap section)." Girls' Life magazine stated "[Mendler] brings the beat in 'Hurricane', where she belts out some sweet raps about being in the middle of a stormy relationship." Kai of Embrace You magazine claimed that the track title was "quite ironic when we’re currently experiencing one of mother nature’s conception of the said thing" and later said that "interestingly enough, I love this song. The acoustic opener caught me instantly and I’m addicted to her 'oh, oh, oh…' The singer’s play on natural disasters as metaphors for the way she feels about her love interest once again showcases how witty she is as an artist. The fast paced pop rock driven track is both catchy and substantial."

== Music video ==
The music video for "Hurricane" was directed by Robert Hales and filmed in London in March 2013. It was released on April 12, 2013. Naomi Scott appears as Mendler's best friend in the video. They previously worked together in the 2011 Disney Channel film Lemonade Mouth.

== Live performances ==
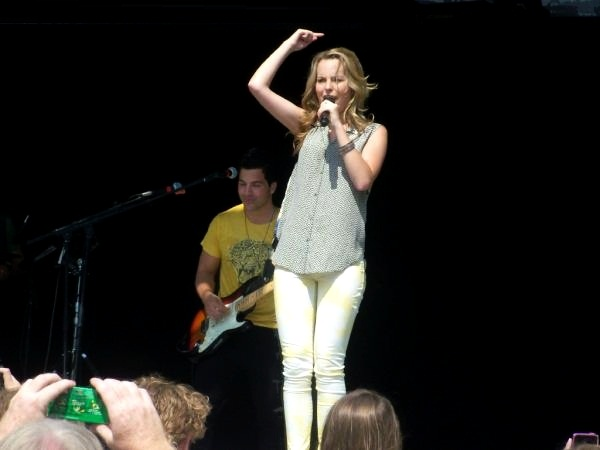
Mendler performing "Hurricane" in New York, in October 2012.

The song was performed in all dates of her tour, Bridgit Mendler: Live in Concert. On October 20, 2012, Mendler performed the song on Radio Disney and Disney Channel webshow Total Access. The first television performance was on March 11, 2013, on Live! with Kelly and Michael. On April 27, 2013, Mendler performed "Hurricane" at the 2013 Radio Disney Music Awards, making it her first performance at an award show. On June 5, 2013, she performed the song on Ellen. Mendler performed "Hurricane" on Today and on Nova FM on August 30, 2013. During an exclusive interview with the Grammy Awards website, she performed "Hurricane" along with "Ready or Not".

== The Hurricane Sessions ==
In April 2013, Mendler recorded a series of four videos which were released to Vevo and YouTube entitled The Hurricane Sessions, and are acoustic performances of two songs from Hello My Name Is... and two covers. On May 8, 2013, the first video, "Starry Eyed", an Ellie Goulding cover, was released. It received positive reviews. Sam Lansky of Idolator commented, "[Mendler's] husky voice works nicely with the song, especially toward the end, as it gets a little more emotive." On May 15, 2013, she released the second song, "Locked Out of Heaven", a Bruno Mars cover. Fanlala said that they "might like Bridgit's version just as much as the original." "Hurricane", the third video, was released on May 22, 2013. Two months later, the final video, "Top of the World", was released on July 23, 2013.

Set list

1. "Starry Eyed" (Ellie Goulding cover) – 3:03
2. "Locked Out of Heaven" (Bruno Mars cover) – 3:38
3. "Hurricane" – 4:04
4. "Top of the World" – 3:01

== Track listings ==
- Digital download
1. "Hurricane" – 4:03
- Digital download
1. "Hurricane" – 4:04
2. "Hurricane" (Acoustic Hurricane Sessions) – 3:57
- Remixes EP
1. "Hurricane" (Bit Error Vocal remix) – 5:30
2. "Hurricane" (Belanger remix) – 4:21
3. "Hurricane" (Frank Lamboy remix) – 5:04
4. "Hurricane" (Alex Ghenea remix) – 4:00
5. "Hurricane" (C&M remix) – 4:13

== Credits and personnel ==
Credits for the album version of "Hurricane" are obtained from Hello My Name Is... liner notes.

- Bridgit Mendler – Vocals, songwriter, background vocals
- Emanuel Kiriakou – Songwriter, producer, keyboards, guitars, bass, programming, background vocals, ukulele
- Evan Kidd Bogart – Songwriter, Michael Mulcahy - Songwriter, background vocals
- Andrew Goldstein – Songwriter, producer, keyboards, guitars, bass, programming, background vocals
- Serban Ghenea – Mixing
- Jens Koerkemeier – Engineer, editing

== Charts ==
Chart (2012–2013)	Peak position
Australia (ARIA)	82
Australia Hitseekers (ARIA)	6
Belgium (Ultratip Bubbling Under Flanders)	65
Belgium (Ultratip Bubbling Under Wallonia)	43
Canada Hot 100 (Billboard)	81
Canada Digital Songs (Billboard)	52
Ireland (IRMA)	77
UK Singles (OCC)	157
US Bubbling Under Hot 100 (Billboard)	1

== Certifications ==
Region	Certification	Certified units/sales
New Zealand (RMNZ)	Platinum	30,000^{‡}
United States (RIAA)	Gold	500,000^{‡}
^{‡} Sales+streaming figures based on certification alone.

== Release history ==
Region	Date	Format	Label	Ref.
United States	October 22, 2012	Digital download	Hollywood	
United Kingdom	June 25, 2013	Digital download	Hollywood	
United Kingdom	June 25, 2013	Digital download (Remixes)	Hollywood	
Sweden	June 25, 2013	Digital download (Remixes)	Hollywood	
South Africa	June 25, 2013	Digital download (Remixes)	Hollywood	
Australia	June 25, 2013	Digital download (Remixes)	Hollywood	
United States	February 12, 2013	Top 40 radio	Hollywood	
United States	June 25, 2013	Digital download (Remixes)	Hollywood	
