= After Midnight Project =

American rock band (2004–2012)

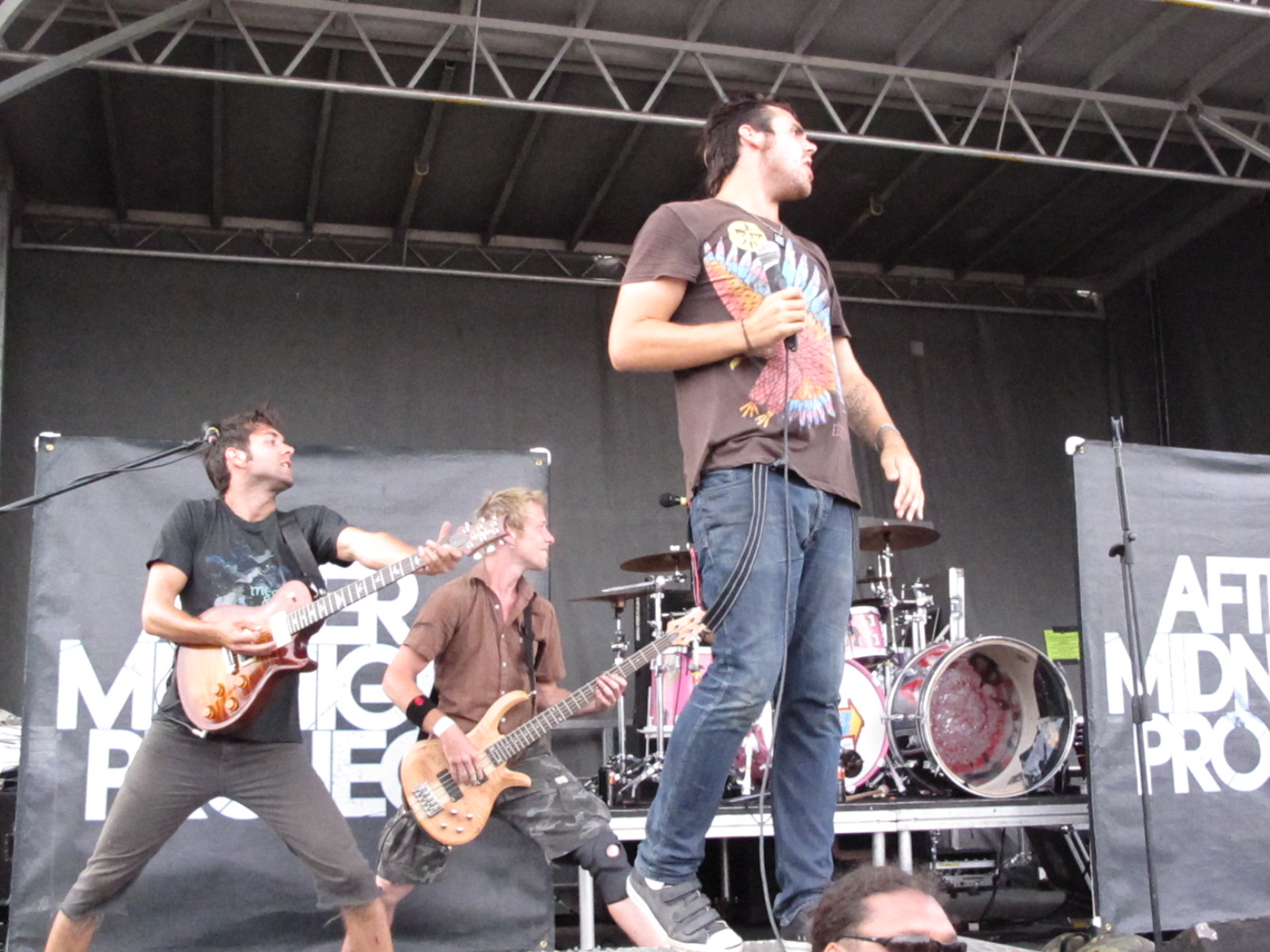
- After Midnight Project at the 2009 Warped Tour.

Background information
- Origin: Los Angeles, California
- Genres: Alternative rock; post-grunge; hard rock
- Years active: 2004–2012
- Past members: Jason Evigan; Spencer Bastian; Christian Meadows; Ryan Folden; Danny Morris; TJ Armstrong
- Website: aftermidnightproject.com

After Midnight Project (commonly abbreviated "AMP") was an American rock band from Los Angeles, California, led by vocalist Jason Evigan. The band was formed in 2004, and disbanded in 2012.

== History ==
After Midnight Project began in 2004 in Los Angeles, California. They are known for their energetic live shows, extensive touring, and close connection to fans. They are also featured in the end credits with their song "Take Me Home" for the game Prey. With the release of their EP, The Becoming, in 2007, they caught the attention of Universal Motown and were signed. They entered the studio with producer, John Feldmann, upon being signed, to record their debut full-length album, Let's Build Something to Break, which was released on August 11, 2009. The album's first single, "Take Me Home" entered the airwaves in June 2009. AMP performed on the Vans Warped Tour in preparation for the release of that album. In 2009 band did multiple interviews and autograph signings for Music Saves Lives.

The band also revealed as early as December 2009 that they would be performing on the entire 2010 Warped Tour.

After Midnight Project toured all through 2009 and 2010 with bands such as Chevelle, Red Jumpsuit Apparatus, Papa Roach, Thirty Seconds to Mars, 10 Years, Story Of the Year and more. The band played numerous radio shows while supporting their hit single, "Take Me Home", which reached number 25 on alternative rock radio. After losing their drummer, Danny Morris, and bass player, T.J. Armstrong, they found Ryan Folden (The Agony Scene/Burn Halo) and bass player Travis and finished off the summer of 2010 playing the entire Vans Warped Tour. Lead singer Jason Evigan commented on line-up changes: "Our drummer quit, he has three kids, and our buddies in Papa Roach immediately said, “We have a guy for you,” and it was Ryan. And then our buddies in Chevelle recommended Travis when our bass player pretty much couldn’t come back to the band because of some legal issues."

After Midnight Project played at the Key Club in West Hollywood with Everclear Dec.14th for Music Saves Lives.

The band announced they would be releasing their first live album entitled, "Live at Bamboozle" on February 22, 2011.

In March 2011, the band embarked on a brief tour with Hawthorne Heights ahead of their new EP release.

After Midnight Project left their label, Universal Motown, and independently released an eight song EP entitled, You Belong on April 1, 2011. The first single, "Hourglass" was released on March 1, 2011.You Belong was released early to fans on March 24, 2011.

Following the release of their new EP, After Midnight Project went on an indefinite hiatus so that lead singer, Jason Evigan, could get married.

The band officially split in 2012. However, in September 2013, they announced a one time reunion show scheduled for March 2014. The reunion show never took place, with no updates since.

== Band members ==
- Jason Evigan – vocals
- Spencer Bastian – guitar
- Christian Meadows – guitar
- Ryan Folden – drums

=== Former members ===
- Danny Morris (2004–2010) – drums
- TJ Armstrong (2004–2010) – bass, vocals

== Discography ==
=== Studio albums ===
- Let's Build Something to Break (Universal Motown, August 11, 2009)

=== Extended plays ===
- After Midnight Project (self-released, June 20, 2005)
- The Becoming (self-released, 2007)
- Live from Bamboozle 2010 (February 22, 2011)
- You Belong (April 1, 2011)

== Singles ==
Year	Title	US Alt.	Album
2009	"Take Me Home"	26	Let's Build Something to Break
2010	"Fighting My Way Back"	—	Let's Build Something to Break
2011	"Hourglass"	—	You Belong (EP)
