= Ready or Not (Bridgit Mendler song) =

2012 single by Bridgit Mendler

Single by Bridgit Mendler

from the album Hello My Name Is...
- Released: August 7, 2012
- Recorded: 2011
- Studio: Chalice Studios (Los Angeles, CA)
- Genre: Pop; R&B
- Length: 3:20
- Label: Hollywood
- Songwriters: Bridgit Mendler; Emanuel Kiriakou; Evan Kidd Bogart; Andrew Goldstein; Thom Bell; William Hart
- Producers: Kiriakou; Goldstein

Bridgit Mendler singles chronology
"Breakthrough" (2011)	"Ready or Not" (2012)	"Hurricane" (2013)

Music video
- "Ready or Not" on YouTube

"Ready or Not" is the debut solo single by American singer Bridgit Mendler, and is the lead single from her debut studio album, Hello My Name Is... (2012), which garnered its name from a line in the song. It premiered on Radio Disney on August 3, 2012, and was released digitally on August 7, 2012. The song's chorus is based on an interpolation of the Fugees' song "Ready or Not", which in turns interpolates the Delfonics' song "Ready or Not Here I Come (Can't Hide from Love)".

"Ready or Not" has received positive reviews from music critics, praising the song's unique sound and Mendler's vocals, which have been compared to Cher Lloyd, Carly Rae Jepsen, and Demi Lovato. The song was a commercial success in the United Kingdom, where it debuted in the top ten of the UK Singles Chart. It was also a modest hit in North America, reaching number 49 on the US Billboard Hot 100 chart, and peaking at number 43 in Canada. The song attained platinum certifications in Canada, Denmark, and the United Kingdom, and a double platinum certification in New Zealand and the United States.

== Writing and composition ==
In an interview with Kidzworld Media about the song, Mendler said: "It’s a fun song about a girl who is feeling like she has been the wallflower her whole life and she wants to go out there and take charge. It has the romantic element of her going for the boy rather than waiting for the world to come to her. I wrote it with some great writers and producers. We wrote most of the album together." Mendler also said of the song: "I'm thrilled to finally share my songs with the world. I wanted to write something that was empowering for girls. I consider myself to have been that girl sitting on the curb waiting for the world to notice".

Mendler co-wrote the song with Emanuel Kiriakou, Evan Kidd Bogart and Andrew Goldstein. Thom Bell and William Hart are also credited as co-writers, because the song's chorus loosely interpolates the 1996 song "Ready or Not" by Fugees, which in turn interpolates the 1968 Delfonics song "Ready or Not Here I Come (Can't Hide from Love)", the song that Bell and Hart originally wrote. The song was produced by Kiriakou and Goldstein.

The song is an up-tempo pop track with a strong undercurrent of soul. A Popdust review stated that "every detail is where it should be, from the multi-tracked vocals on the chorus to the synth sound effects that provide punctuation and punchlines to the verses, to some of the more clever rhymes in the lyrics — which include pairing "Oprah" with "Boca" and "I’m like a crook tonight" with "I could be your kryptonite." The song consists of "layers of synths and backing vocals adding a musical and emotional intensity totally absent from the carefree verses." The song also mentions Prince William and Catherine Middleton. Mendler's vocals span from the low note of A_{3} to the high note of D_{6}.

== Critical reception ==
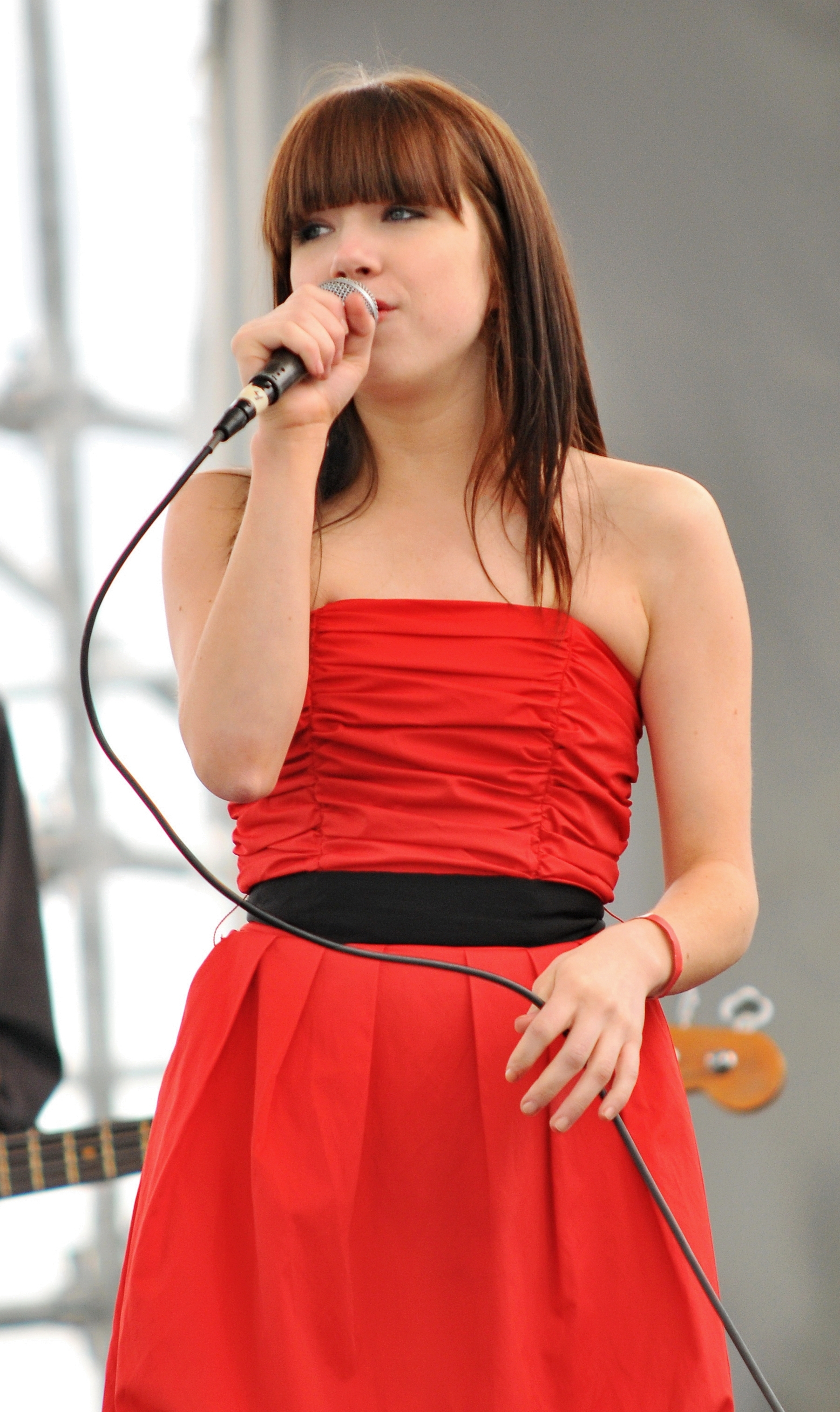
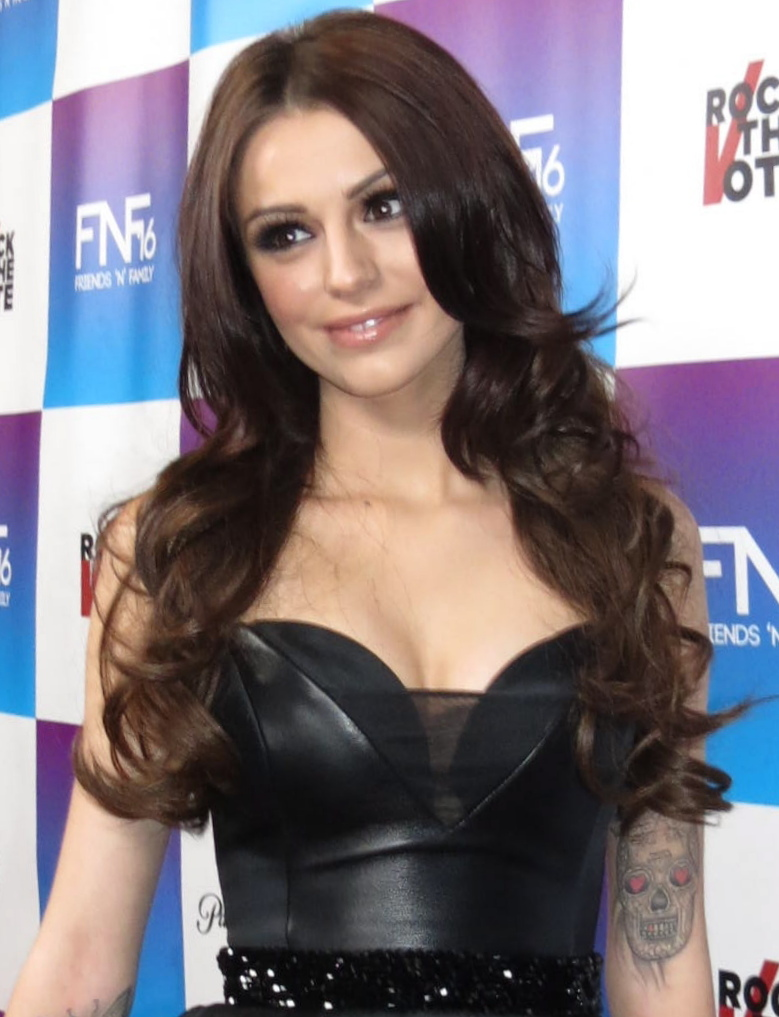
"Ready or Not" has been compared to the works of Carly Rae Jepsen and Cher Lloyd.

The song received praise from music critics. Andrew Unterberger of Popdust was very positive with his review, saying that the song "is a playful, swinging and just impossibly catchy — the catchiest we've heard since our girl Carly Rae — pop number". He also praised Mendler's vocals and chorus. He concluded his review saying that "Will that out-of-placeness hurt the chances of [Ready or Not] becoming the smash it deserves to be, though? Well, it didn’t seem to hurt "Want U Back" any, so we’re hoping that people can see that this song is basically a smarter, more interesting and infinitely catchier version of that already-quite-good Cher Lloyd song. But it’s on all of us to spread the word that that song scraping the bottom of the iTunes chart isn’t just another kiddie-pop anthem from the latest made-for-Disney movie — it's one of the best songs of the year, and one you’d have to be a pretty sullen sort of person to not love at least a little bit." Devin Alessio of Seventeen said that "[Mendler] is in line to be the next superstar off the Disney Channel". She praised her vocals, saying that "her sound is a mix between Carly Rae Jepsen and Demi Lovato" and described the music video as "super fun". She concluded that "[Ready or Not] is a total girl anthem — perfect for listening to when you're just chilling with your friends or getting ready for homecoming."

== Chart performance ==
The song debuted at number 98 on the US Billboard Hot 100, and debuted at number 80 on the Canadian Hot 100, later peaking at number 43 in the latter, making it her second song to chart there. The song also debuted at number 14 on the US Top Heatseekers, later peaking at number three. In its 11th week on Billboard Hot 100 the single jumped from position 94 to its peak of 49 selling 138,552 digital copies. On January 11, 2013, the song was certified Gold in the US. It also debuted at peaked number 17 on the New Zealand Singles Chart and number seven on the UK Singles Chart, selling 38,208 digital copies in its first week in the United Kingdom where it stayed in the top ten for four consecutive weeks and sold over 250,000 copies.

== Music video ==
=== Background ===
The music video was directed by Philip Andelman and it filmed at multiple locations in Los Angeles, California. The official music video for the single was released on August 10, 2012. It shows the course of a scavenger hunt from day to evening, as items are checked off a list.

=== Lyric video ===
The lyric video was released on Mendler's VEVO channel on August 3, 2012. The video starts with the camera showing Mendler's hands grabbing a box labelled "scavenger hunt". When she opens it, inside are pictures from the music video and below the pictures are the lyrics of the song. In the end, she closes the box and the label changes to the song title and leaves the box there.

=== Synopsis ===
The music video starts with Mendler singing and hanging out with her friends at the top of Mulholland Drive. Then they drive off to start their "scavenger hunt". In the chorus, they are seen driving around Hollywood. Then they visit a restaurant called Hama Sushi in Venice, California and they all take a picture behind the sushi bar, which is one of their scavenger hunts. Then in the second verse of the song, they go to North Venice and Mendler is seen singing in a rowboat and all of them take a picture in the rowboat along with her. Then some of her friends are seen in a skate park where a person is skateboarding and jumps over a guy who is lying upwards—another one of their scavenger hunts. Then in the chorus again, they are seen hanging out downtown and in the Hollywood Walk of Fame. In the end, they are done with their scavenger hunt and they are seen in a rooftop partying. Kiss member Gene Simmons can be seen in the video.

== Live performances ==
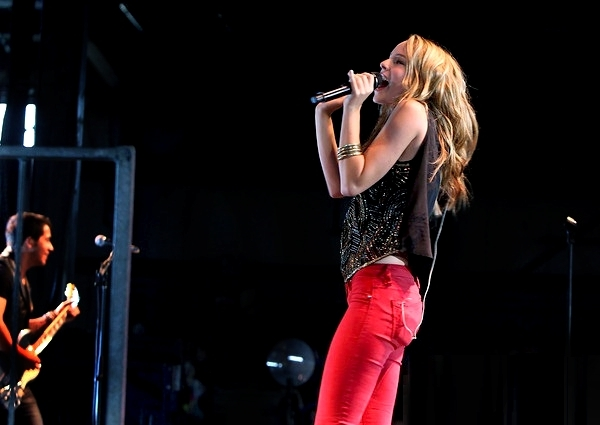
Mendler performing "Ready or Not" in Topsfield, in 2012.

The song was performed in all dates of her tour, Bridgit Mendler: Live in Concert. The acoustic version of "Ready or Not" was performed on Off the Charts, on Clevver TV, on October 19, 2012. In October 20, Mendler performed the song on Radio Disney and Disney Channel show Total Access. She performed at The Morning Show in Toronto, Canada on August 27, 2012. Then she performed song on New Music Live in Toronto, Canada on August 28, 2012. Mendler also performed the song on Good Morning America on November 14, 2012, and Live! with Kelly and Michael on November 15, 2012, respectively.

The song also was performed on The X Factor semi-final results show on December 13, 2012. The performance has received mixed reviews. Sam Lansky to Idolator comments that Mendler was very nervous and didn't have a good start. He said "Mendler started off a little shaky, but eventually found her footing". Amy Sciarretto of PopCrush said about the performance: "Looking sexy and sweet in a black tank, black shorts and thigh-high black boots, the 19-year-old blond diva-in-training turned in a punchy performance, complete with just the right sprinkle of sass." Despite the mixed reviews, Mendler fronted up and admitted she was nervous about the whole performance and she was also nervous to sing for Britney Spears, according to Pop Stop.

== Cover versions ==
- On August 13, 2013, Brazilian singer Nathalia Bacci covered the song on her Acoustic Sessions.

== Awards and nominations ==
Title	Year	Category	Result	Ref.
Pop Crush Awards	2012	About to Pop (Best song)	Won	
Pop Dust Awards	2012	The 100 Best Songs of 2012	9th	
Shorty Awards	2013	Best Song	Nominated	
Radio Disney Music Awards	2013	Best Acoustic Performance	Won	
Radio Disney Music Awards	2013	Best Music Video	Nominated	

== Track listings ==
- Digital download
1. "Ready or Not" – 3:20
- US promo CD
1. "Ready or Not" – 3:20
2. "Ready or Not" – 3:20
3. "Ready or Not" – 3:20
4. "Ready or Not" (callout hook) – 0:08
- UK promo CD
1. "Ready or Not" (radio edit) – 3:20
- Remixes EP
1. "Ready or Not" – 3:21
2. "Ready or Not (DJ M3 remix)" (radio) – 3:39
3. "Ready or Not (DJ Mike D Remix)" (extended mixshow) – 3:36
4. "Ready or Not (DJ M3 Remix)" (extended) – 4:53

== Charts ==
=== Weekly charts ===
Chart (2012–2013)	Peak position
Australia (ARIA)	53
Australia Hitseekers (ARIA)	1
Austria (Ö3 Austria Top 40)	25
Belgium (Ultratip Bubbling Under Flanders)	10
Belgium (Ultratop 50 Wallonia)	50
Canada Hot 100 (Billboard)	43
Czech Republic Airplay (ČNS IFPI)	27
Denmark (Tracklisten)	36
France (SNEP)	49
Hungary (Rádiós Top 40)	11
Ireland (IRMA)	15
Netherlands (Dutch Top 40)	34
Netherlands (Single Top 100)	57
New Zealand (Recorded Music NZ)	12
Romania (Airplay 100)	46
Scotland Singles (OCC)	6
Slovakia Airplay (ČNS IFPI)	45
UK Singles (OCC)	7
US Billboard Hot 100	49
US Heatseakers Songs (Billboard)	3
US Pop Airplay (Billboard)	26

=== Year-end charts ===
Chart (2013)	Position
Hungary (Rádiós Top 40)	93
UK Singles (OCC)	68

== Certifications ==
Region	Certification	Certified units/sales
Brazil (Pro-Música Brasil)	Gold	30,000^{‡}
Canada (Music Canada)	Platinum	80,000^{*}
New Zealand (RMNZ)	2× Platinum	60,000^{‡}
United Kingdom (BPI)	Platinum	600,000^{‡}
United States (RIAA)	2× Platinum	2,000,000^{‡}
Streaming
Denmark (IFPI Danmark)	Platinum	1,800,000^{†}
^{*} Sales figures based on certification alone.^{‡} Sales+streaming figures based on certification alone.^{†} Streaming-only figures based on certification alone.

== Release history ==
Region	Date	Format	Label	Ref.
United States	August 3, 2012	Radio Disney Premiere	Hollywood	
Worldwide	August 7, 2012	Digital download	Hollywood	
United States	August 21, 2012	Top 40 radio	Hollywood	
United Kingdom	March 2, 2013	Remixes EP	Hollywood	
