= Ridley (surname) =

Ridley is a surname, and may refer to:

== A ==
- Aaron Ridley (born 1962), British philosopher
- Aaron J. Ridley, American atmospheric researcher
- Adam Ridley (born 1942), British economist
- Alan Ridley (1910–1993), Australian rugby league footballer
- Alex Ridley (born 1996), New Zealand cricketer
- Alfred Ridley (1849–1898), English British Army officer and cricketer
- Alfred Ridley-Martin (1881–1970), British fencer
- Alice Tan Ridley (born 1952), American gospel and R&B singer
- Alonzo Ridley (1826–1909), American engineer and Confederate Army officer
- Amy Ridley (born 2002), Australian goalball athlete
- Andrew Ridley (born 1968), Australian cricketer
- Anne Ridley (born 1963), British biologist
- Annie E. Ridley (1839–1923), British novelist
- Archie Ridley (1869–1950), New Zealand cricketer
- Arnold Ridley (1896–1984), English actor and playwright
- Arthur Ridley (1852–1916), English cricketer

== B ==
- Betty Ridley (1909–2005), British Church of England administrator
- Bill Ridley (1934–2019), American basketball player
- Bob Ridley (born 1942), English footballer
- Brian Ridley (born 1931), British solid-state physicist

== C ==
- Caleb Ridley (1873–1932), Ku Klux Klan member
- Calvin Ridley (born 1994), American football player
- Cameron Ridley (born 1993), American basketball player
- Charles William Ridley (1812–1867), British soldier
- Christophe Ridley (born 1993), French rugby referee
- Christopher Ridley (1946–2009), South African cricketer
- Cicely Ridley (1927–2008), British-American applied mathematician
- Clarence S. Ridley (1883–1969), American military officer, governor of the Panama Canal Zone
- Claude Alward Ridley (1897–1942), British military officer and aviator
- Clem Ridley (1909–1988), Australian politician
- Curt Ridley (1951–2021), Canadian ice hockey goaltender
- Cyril Ridley (1895–1920), British World War I flying ace

== D ==
- Daisy Ridley (born 1992), English actress
- Dave Ridley (1916–1998), Welsh footballer
- David Ridley (born 1954), English cricketer
- Dorsey Ridley (born 1953), American politician

== E ==
- Edward Ridley (1843–1928), English barrister, politician and judge
- Evan Alexandrow-Ridley (born 1996), Lithuanian-Australian football goalkeeper
- Eve Ridley (born 2011), English actress

== F ==
- Florida Ruffin Ridley (1861–1943), African-American civil rights activist and writer
- Frank Ridley (secularist) (1897–1994), British Marxist, secularist and writer
- Frank L. Ridley, American film and television actor
- Frank M. Ridley (1883–1953), American college football player and physician
- Fred Ridley (born 1952), American amateur golfer and golf administrator

== G ==
- Gary Ridley (1945–2022), American engineer
- George Ridley (Labour politician) (1886–1944), British Member of Parliament
- George Ridley (Whig politician) (1818–1887), British Member of Parliament
- George "Geordie" Ridley (1835–1864), British concert hall songwriter and performer on Tyneside
- Gerald Ridley (1897–1953), English cricketer
- Giles Ridley (born 1944), English cricketer
- Glocester Ridley (1702–1774), English writer
- Greg Ridley (1942–2003), English rock bassist
- Guy Ridley (1885–1947), English barrister

== H ==
- Harold Ridley (Jesuit) (1939–2005), President of Loyola College, Maryland
- Harold Ridley (ophthalmologist) (1906–2001), English ophthalmologist
- Harrison Ridley Jr. (1938–2009), American radio broadcaster
- Harry Ridley (1904–1989), English footballer
- Harry Ridley (cricketer) (1868–1949), New Zealand cricketer
- Henry Nicholas Ridley (1855–1956), English botanist
- Humphrey Ridley (1653–1708), English physician

== I ==
- Ian Ridley (1934–2008), Australian rules footballer

== J ==
- Jack Ridley (baseball) (born 1905), American Negro leagues baseball player
- Jack Ridley (engineer) (1919–2006), New Zealand civil engineer and politician
- Jack Ridley (pilot) (1915–1957), American aeronautical engineer and test pilot
- Jack Ridley (swim coach), American competitive swimmer and swim coach
- James Ridley (1736–1765), English author
- James Ridley (footballer) (born 1889), English footballer
- Jane Ridley (born 1953), British biographer
- Jason Ridley (born 1977), American politician from Georgia
- Jasper Ridley (banker) (1887–1951), British banker
- Jasper Ridley (historian) (1920–2004), British writer known for historical biographies
- Jeanne Clare Ridley (1925–2007), American sociologist, statistician and demographer
- Jessica Ridley (born 1985), Canadian singer-songwriter
- Jim Ridley (1945–2008), Canadian baseball player
- Joan Ridley (1903–1983), British tennis player
- Jody Ridley (born 1942), American NASCAR driver
- John Ridley (born 1965), American film director, actor, and writer
- John Ridley (footballer) (1952–2020), English footballer
- John Ridley (footballer, born 1898) (1898–1977), English footballer
- John Ridley (inventor) (1806–1887), best known for "Ridley's Stripper"
- John S. Ridley (1882–1934), Canadian politician
- Jordan Ridley (born 1998), Australian rules footballer
- Jordan Ridley (politician), American politician from Georgia

== L ==
- Lancelot Ridley (died 1576), English clergyman and theologian, father of physician Mark Ridley
- Larry Ridley (born 1937), American jazz bassist
- Lee Ridley (born 1981), English footballer
- Lee Ridley (comedian) (born 1980), English stand-up comedian

== M ==
- Mabel Ridley (1895–1938), African-American singer
- Malcolm Ridley (born 1962), English actor and writer
- Mark Ridley (physician) (1560–1624), English physician and mathematician
- Mark Ridley (zoologist) (born 1956), English zoologist
- Mark Ridley-Thomas (born 1954), American politician and felon
- Martin Ridley (1861–1936), English photographer
- Matt Ridley (born 1958), British science writer, financier, 5th Viscount Ridley
- Matthew Ridley (barrister) (1711–1778), English barrister, coal magnate and businessman
- Matthew White Ridley, 1st Viscount Ridley (1842–1904), British statesman
- Matthew White Ridley, 2nd Viscount Ridley (1874–1916), British politician
- Matthew White Ridley, 3rd Viscount Ridley (1902–1964), British landowner and race car driver
- Matthew White Ridley, 4th Viscount Ridley (1925–2012), British courtier
- Sir Matthew White Ridley, 2nd Baronet (1745–1813), British landowner and politician
- Sir Matthew White Ridley, 3rd Baronet (1778–1836), British politician
- Sir Matthew White Ridley, 4th Baronet (1807–1877), British politician
- Maurice Ridley (1915–1960), Canadian politician from Manitoba
- Michael Ridley (writer), English author, archaeologist and orientalist
- Michael Ridley (cricketer) (born 1947), English cricketer
- Michael Kershaw Ridley (born 1937), Clerk of the Council of the Duchy of Lancaster
- Mike Ridley (born 1963), Canadian ice hockey player

== N ==
- Nicholas Ridley (martyr) (died 1555), English bishop
- Nicholas Ridley, Baron Ridley of Liddesdale (1929–1993), British politician
- Nicholas Ridley-Colborne, 1st Baron Colborne (1779–1854), British politician

== P ==
- Philip Ridley (born 1960), British artist

== R ==
- Ralph Ridley (born 1904), English football goalkeeper
- Reginald Ridley (1883–1971), New Zealand cricketer
- Riley Ridley (born 1996) American football player
- Rita Ridley (1946–2013), English runner
- Rosalind Ridley (born 1949), British neuropsychologist
- Roy Ridley (1890–1969), British academic, writer and poet

== S ==
- Samuel Ridley (1864–1944), British industrialist and politician
- Sandra Ridley, Canadian poet
- Sebastian Claude Ridley (1853–1924), English organist, pianist and composer
- Sebastian Ridley-Thomas (born 1987), American politician
- Stevan Ridley (born 1989), American football player
- Stuart Oliver Ridley (1853–1935), English cleric and zoologist

== T ==
- Thomas Ridley (1799–1879), merchant and political figure in Newfoundland
- Thomas H. Ridley (1828–1904), merchant and political figure in Newfoundland, son of Thomas Ridley the merchant
- Thomas Ridley (cricketer) (1858–1945), English barrister, clergyman and cricketer
- Todd Ridley (born 1969), Australian rules footballer
- Tony Ridley (born 1933), British civil engineer and academic

== U ==
- Ursula Ridley, Viscountess Ridley (1904–1967), British magistrate, campaigner and charity worker

== W ==
- Wally Ridley (1913–2007), British record producer and songwriter
- William Ridley (Presbyterian missionary) (1819–1878), English Presbyterian missionary and linguist in Australia
- William Ridley (bishop) (1836–1911), English Anglican missionary in Canada
- William Henry Ridley (1816–1882), Anglican priest and author
- William Ridley-Colborne (1814–1846), British politician

== Y ==
- Yvonne Ridley (born 1958), English journalist
