= Kari Kimmel =

American musician

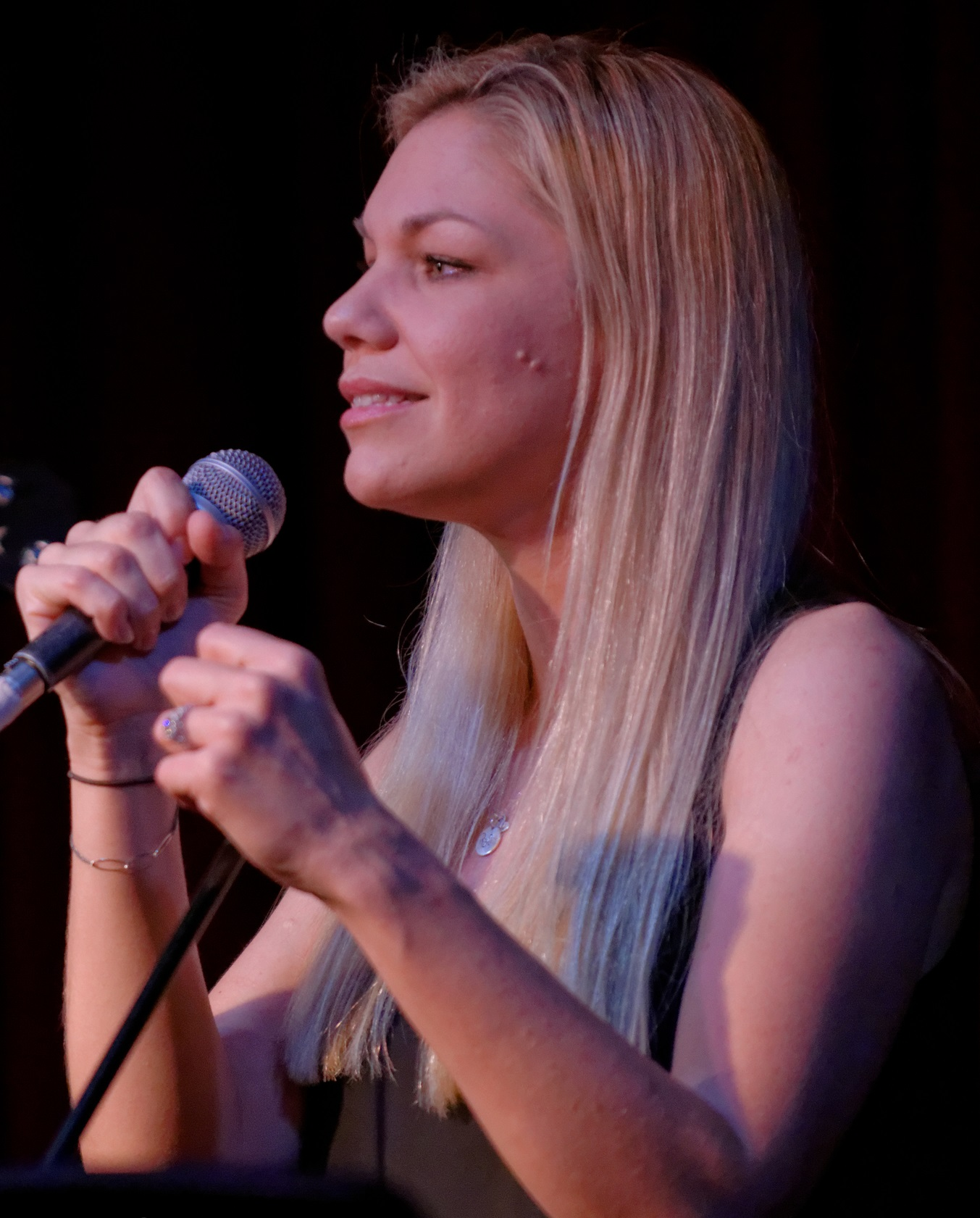
- Kimmel on stage in 2014
- Born: Kari Meredyth Kimmel; Boca Raton, Florida, U.S.
- Occupations: Singer; songwriter; composer; producer
- Years active: 2004–present
- Musical career
- Genres: Pop; rock; folk
- Instruments: Vocals; piano; guitar
- Website: karikimmel.com

Kari Meredyth Kimmel (born 1978) is an American singer, songwriter, composer, and producer. She is best known for the theme track It's Not Just Make Believe for Ella Enchanted, the theme track Black for The Walking Dead trailer, her Cruel Summer cover for Cobra Kai, and the theme track Where You Belong for The Fosters. Her music ranges across the genres of pop, rock and folk.

== Early life and education ==
Kimmel was born and raised in Boca Raton, Florida. Shortly after graduating high school, she relocated to Los Angeles to pursue a career in music.

She has cited Carole King as her biggest musical inspiration. She has also stated that she draws inspiration from Bonnie Raitt, Elton John and Sheryl Crow.

== Career ==
Kimmel's career began when she was cast to sing the theme song It's Not Just Make Believe for the 2004 Disney live-action film Ella Enchanted. She also appeared in the music video, which featured on Radio Disney. Kimmel then connected with Randy Spendlove, the president of motion picture music at Miramax at the time, with whom she went on to collaborate on over 20 film projects.

Kimmel has written, arranged, produced, and performed music which has been licensed in over 650 studio films, network television series, trailers, video games, and commercials. Notable productions include the films Blockers, World War Z, Southpaw, and The Duff, the television shows America's Funniest Home Videos, The Office, New Girl, Pretty Little Liars, The Lying Game and Grimm, in addition to the Walking Dead trailer. Her music has also been used in advertisements for Google and Nissan, and the popular video game The Sims. Her track Let's Light It Up was used by WWE wrestler AJ Lee as her entrance theme.

Kimmel has composed 18 theme songs for multiple television series, including Where You Belong for family drama series The Fosters, and has performed tracks in the films Pitch Perfect, Pitch Perfect 2, Dreamgirls, Danny Collins, Descendants, Descendants 2, Teen Beach Movie, Teen Beach Movie 2, and Footloose. Her music video for the track Low was used to promote the television series Private Practice and her music video for the track Trouble aired on Oxygen and KNBC. She has also performed live on The Adam Corolla Show, The Danny Bonaduce Show, The Conway & Whitman Show, KNBC, and Fox Sports West and Prime Ticket and at multiple venues in Los Angeles, including Los Angeles Dodgers games, Los Angeles Lakers games, and the AIDS Walk benefit, hosted by Prince Edward and the Greek Theatre in 2010, where she closed the show.

Kimmel has also written songs which have been recorded by notable artists including The Backstreet Boys, Kesha, Joe Jonas, Demi Lovato and Gloria Gaynor. She has also sung background vocals for Ringo Starr, Bruce Springsteen, Alicia Keys, John Legend, Stevie Wonder, John Mayer, Willie Nelson, and Pharrell.

Kimmel has released five solo albums, titled A Life in the Day, Out of Focus, From the Vault, Go, and Black. Her sixth solo album Gold & Glitter was released on May 25, 2018. The title track was featured in the 2018 comedy film Blockers.

In 2015, Kimmel launched her own licensing company Glow Music Group, and now represents over 200 bands in addition to her own music. In 2017, she led a writer's retreat for VocalizeU and ASCAP in Ojai, CA.

== Discography ==
=== Albums ===
Year	Title	Label	Other Artist(s)	Notes
2006	A Life in the Day	Independent		
2010	Out of Focus	Independent		
2011	From the Vault	Independent		
2011	Go	Independent		
2015	Black	Independent		
2016	Poppyfields	Independent		
2018	Gold & Glitter	Independent		Title track Gold & Glitter featured in 2018 film Blockers

=== EPs ===
Year	Title	Label	Other Artist(s)	Notes
2008	Pink Balloon	Tzviah		
2011	Own It	Hype Music		
2012	Christmastime	Independent		
2013	Fix You Up	Independent		
2017	Covers, Vol. 1	Independent		

=== Singles ===
Year	Title	Label	Other Artist(s)	Notes
2008	Let It Go/Taking a Ride			
2008	Low	Tzviah		
2008	Dance With Joy	Sara Lee/Amber (Heavenly)	Matt Meils	
2011	Pennies for Adam			
2011	STFU			
2011	Black	Independent		The Walking Dead trailer track
2011	Let's Light It Up	WWE Music Group		WWE wrestler AJ Lee's entrance track
2012	Fire	International Family Entertainment		
2012	Payphone			
2012	These Boots Are Made for Walkin'	Independent		
2012	Fourteen Minutes			
2012	BNE (Best Night Ever)			
2012	Fix You Up			
2012	Perfect Day			
2012	Christmastime			
2013	Where You Belong	ABC Family		The Fosters' theme song
2013	While You Were Up High			
2013	Fingerprints			
2013	Shooting Star	Independent		
2013	Summertime	Rykim Records		
2014	Best Day	Independent		
2015	Everything is Feeling' Right	Independent		
2015	Everybody Has to Fall	Independent		
2015	Best Thing	Independent		
2015	Happy Family	Independent		
2017	I See Trouble	Freeform		
2017	Run Run Run	Independent		
2017	Don't Feel Like Christmas Without You	Independent		
2018	Voices			

=== Soundtracks ===
Year	Production	Title	Role	Other Artist(s)	Notes
2004	Ella Enchanted	It's Not Just Make Believe	Performer		
2004	Shall We Dance	Taking a Ride	Writer, performer		
2004	Chestnut: Hero of Central Park	Wonderful Day	Writer, performer		
2006	The Cutting Edge: Going for the Gold	Taking a Ride	Writer, performer		Video
2007	Girl, Positive	Fly	Writer, performer		TV Movie
2007	Victoria Beckham: Coming to America	Taking a Ride	Writer, performer		TV Movie
2007	Custody	Taking a Ride	Writer, performer		TV Movie
2007	The Deadly Pledge	Can't Be Everything	Arranger, performer, producer, writer		TV Movie
2007	Holiday in Handcuffs	Taking a Ride	Writer, performer		TV Movie
2008	Tinker Bell	Fly With Me	Performer		Video
2009	Princess Protection Program	Is It Just Me	Performer		TV Movie
2009	Bitter/Sweet	Low	Writer, performer		
2010	Reviving Ophelia	Remember	Writer, performer		TV Movie
2010	Reviving Ophelia	Save Me	Writer, performer		TV Movie
2010	Knucklehead	Taking a Ride	Writer, performer		
2010	Space Dogs	Watching Over You	Writer, performer		
2010	Space Dogs	I Got You	Writer, performer		
2011	Carnal Innocence	Remember	Writer, performer		TV Movie
2011	12 Dates of Christmas	Christmastime	Writer, performer		TV Movie
2011	The Chaperone	Go	Writer, performer		
2011	The Chaperone	Let It Go	Writer, performer		
2011	The Family Tree	STFU	Writer, performer		
2012	The Pregnancy Project	Finally Free	Writer		TV Movie
2012	The Pregnancy Project	Don't Give Up	Writer		TV Movie
2012	Radio Rebel	Brand New Day	Writer, performer		TV Movie
2012	Pitch Perfect		Female Voice No. 5		
2013	Our Wild Hearts	Who I Am	Performer		TV Movie
2013	World War Z	Go	Writer, performer		
2013	Girl on a Bicycle	It Just Takes a Moment	Performer		
2013	Girl on a Bicycle	Play With Me	Performer		
2014	A Tiger's Tail	Great Big World	Writer, performer		
2014	A Tiger's Tail	Best Day	Writer, performer		
2014	A Tiger's Tail	Watching Over You	Writer, performer		
2014	A Tiger's Tail		Composer (additional music)		
2014	Ouija	Go	Writer, performer		Short Film
2015	Project Almanac	Extraverdant	Writer, performer		
2015	Backstreet Boys: Show 'Em What You're Made Of	Incomplete	Lyrics, Music		
2015	The DUFF	Nothing Left to Lose	Writer, performer		
2015	Danny Collins		Danny's Background Singer		
2015	Southpaw	Perfect Day	Writer, performer		
2016	Face 2 Face	Always Got Me	Performer		
2016	Face 2 Face	Best Day	Performer		
2016	Face 2 Face	Brand New Day	Performer		
2016	Face 2 Face	Go	Performer		
2016	Face 2 Face	Imagine	Performer		
2016	Face 2 Face	On Your Side	Performer		
2016	Face 2 Face	Such a Good Time	Performer		
2017	Veeram	We Will Rise	Performer		
2018	Blockers	Gold & Glitter	Writer, performer		
	American Paradise		Composer, Composer (theme music)		

=== Songwriting ===
Year	Title	Label	Other Artist(s)	Notes
2001	No Less	Reunion Records	Joy Williams	
2001	Moonlight	Avex Trax	MAX	
2002	Stronger		Gloria Gaynor	
2004	I Could	Curb Records	Kimberley Locke	
2005	Incomplete	Jive	Backstreet Boys	
2005	Taking a Ride	Frontiers Records	Robin Beck	
2010	My Song For You	Walt Disney	Demi Lovato, Joe Jonas	
2011	Velvet Sky	Nine North Records	Jessica Ridley	
2012	My Song For You	Walt Disney	Bridgit Mendler, Shane Harper	
2017	Riding Free	Back Lot Music	Maisy Stella	
	Paper Airplane		Kesha	Unreleased

== Awards and nominations ==
In 2017 Kimmel was honored, along with over a hundred other individuals, when she was awarded an ASCAP Screen Music Award for composing The Fosters' theme song Where You Belong.
