= City Road, Cardiff =

Road in Cardiff, Wales

City Road
- B4261
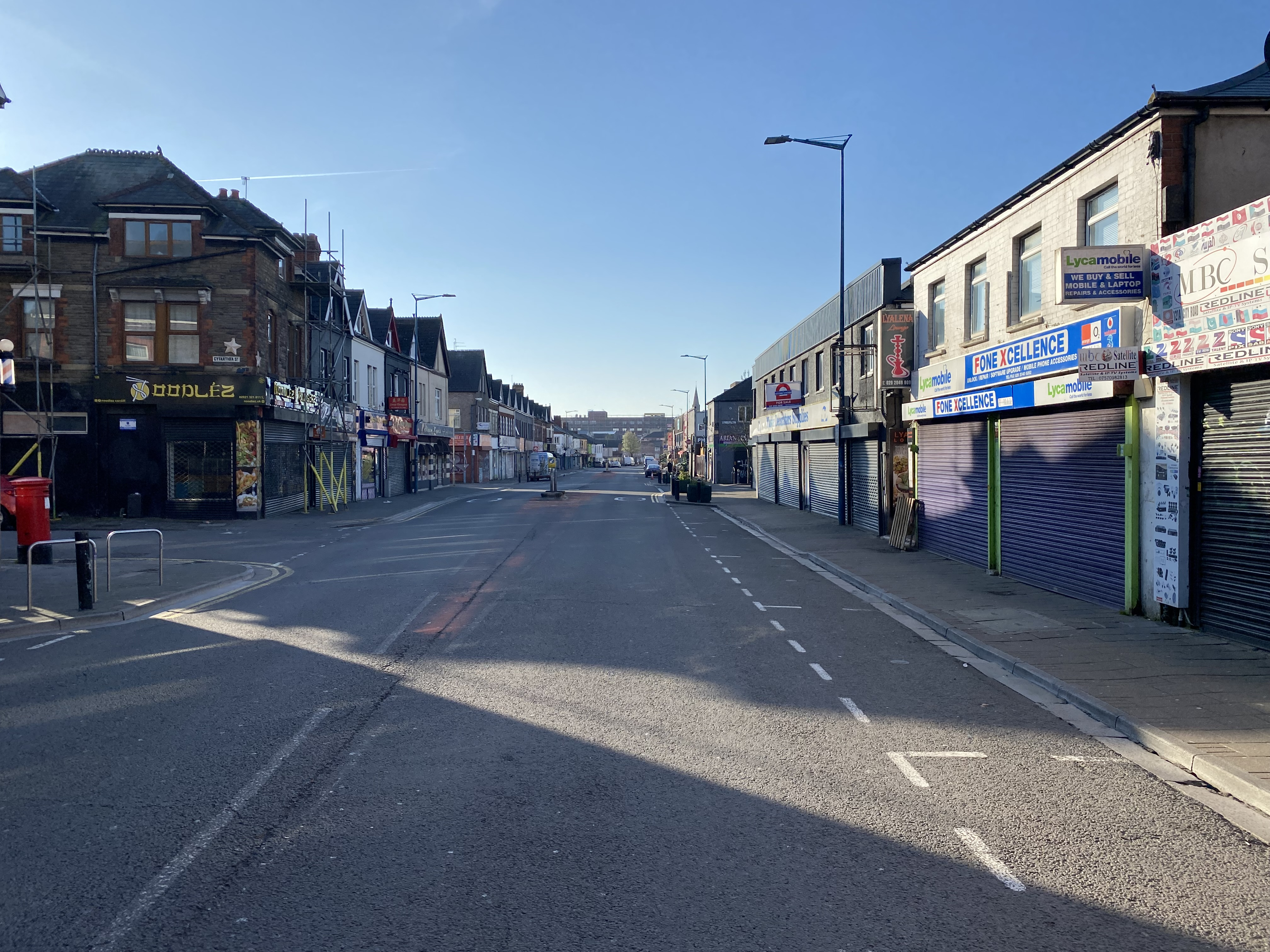
- Just over half way up City Road looking south
- Interactive map of City Road
- Former names: Plwcca Lane, Castle Road
- Maintained by: Cardiff Council
- Length: 1.0 km (0.62 mi)
- Area: Plasnewydd/Roath
- Postal code: CF24
- Coordinates: 51.489°N 3.168°W
- From: Crwys Road / Albany Road (A469) "Death Junction"
- To: Newport Road (A4161)

City Road (Welsh: Heol y Plwca) runs through Cathays in Cardiff, Wales. Designated as the B4261, it runs roughly 1 km (0.6 mi) south-southeasterly from the junction of Crwys Road (A469) and Albany Road (known as "Death Junction"), to Newport Road (A4161). It is lined with small shops and business premises.

The road has hosted a number of public houses, a cinema and a college campus. It has gained a reputation for its multicultural mixture of restaurants and food takeaways.

== History ==
City Road was originally known as Plwcca Lane (Welsh: Alai Plwcca), plwcca meaning dirty, wet, uncultivated land, and alai meaning alley. In 1830 Plwcca Lane consisted of Roath Castle and six small cottages in two fields. It led to Plwcca Halog, named after the Gallows Field, which was where public executions were carried out.

Junctions to City Road

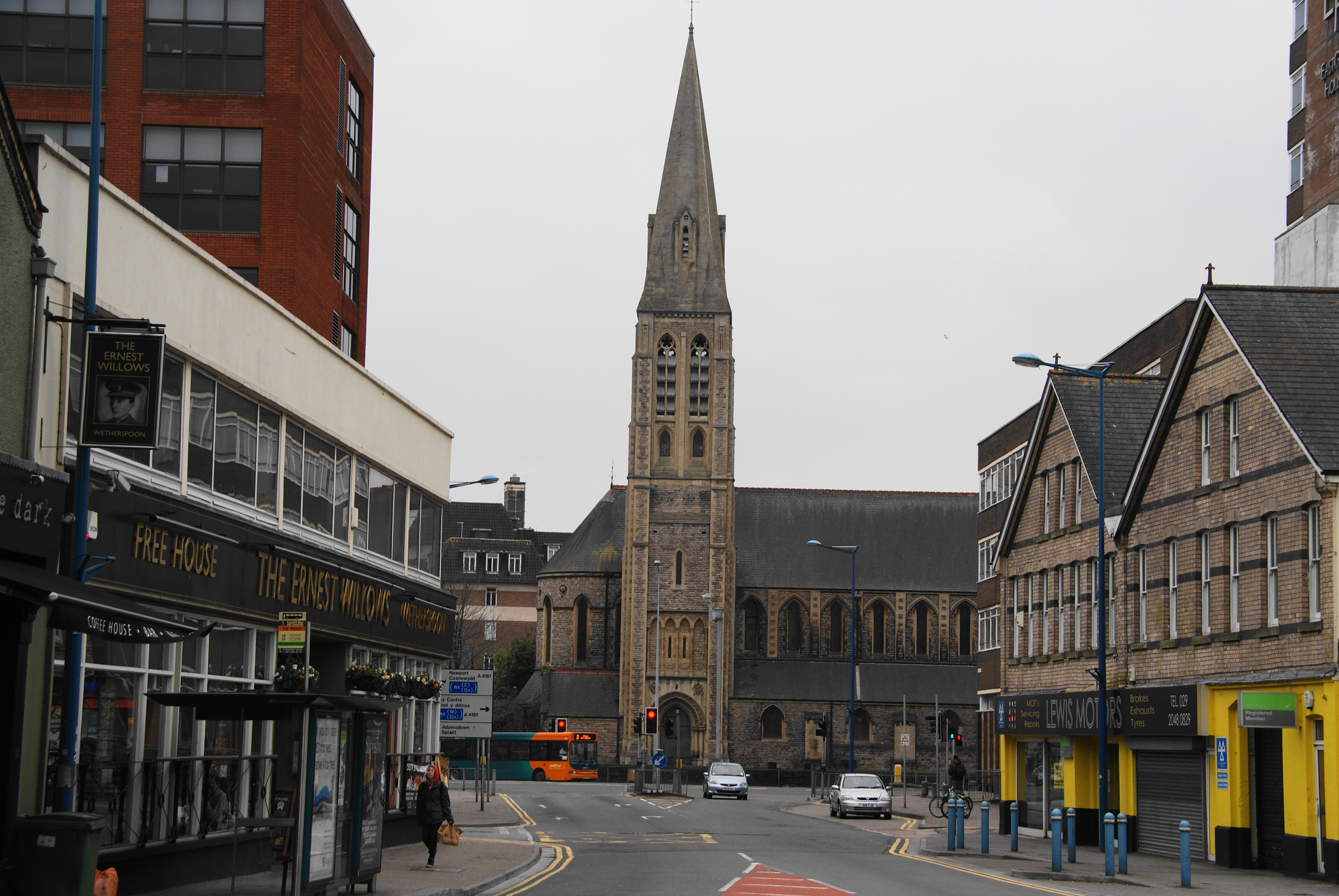
The southern end of City Road (junction with Newport Road)

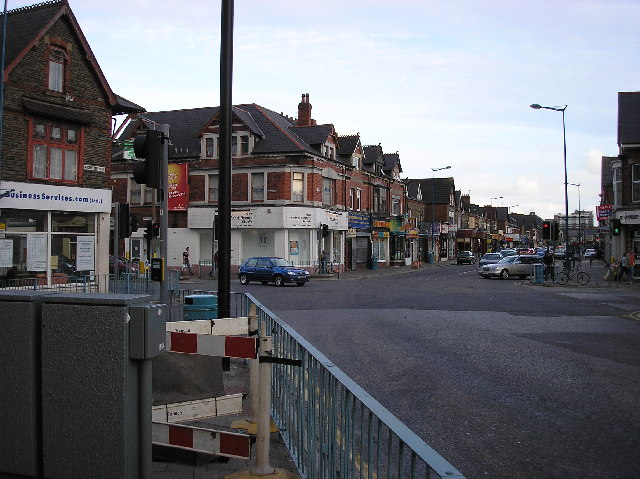
The northern end of City Road (Death Junction)

Plwcca Lane became Castle Road in 1874, which was named after Roath Castle. It ran north–south from Cardiff through the settlement of Plasnewydd. Roath and Plasnewydd were absorbed into Cardiff in 1875. Castle Road was renamed City Road in 1905 to mark Cardiff's new city status, after the Parish of Roath was absorbed into the county borough of Cardiff in 1903, as Cardiff already had another Castle Street. City Road gained the B4261 number classification in the late 1920s.

=== Death Junction ===
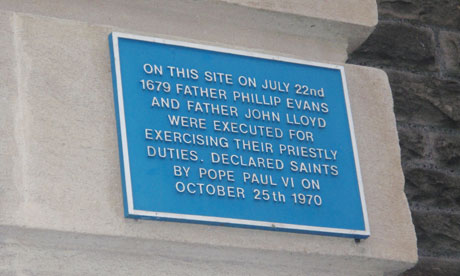
Plaque marking the site of the execution of Saints Philip Evans and John Lloyd in Cardiff in 1679

The northern point, where five roads (City Road, Richmond Road, Crwys Road, Mackintosh Place, Albany Road) meet, has been nicknamed "Death Junction". One explanation behind this nickname is due to the difficulty for pedestrians in crossing the intersection. Another theory is that the nickname stemmed from the historical Gallows Field, that stood where Richmond Road is today. In 1679 Philip Evans and John Lloyd were hung, drawn and quartered at these gallows. The two Roman Catholic priests were arrested and charged with treason following the aftermath of the Popish Plot. Evans and Lloyd were canonised by Pope Paul VI in 1970. Two plaques mark the site, attached to the NatWest bank on Richmond Road.

== TV series ==
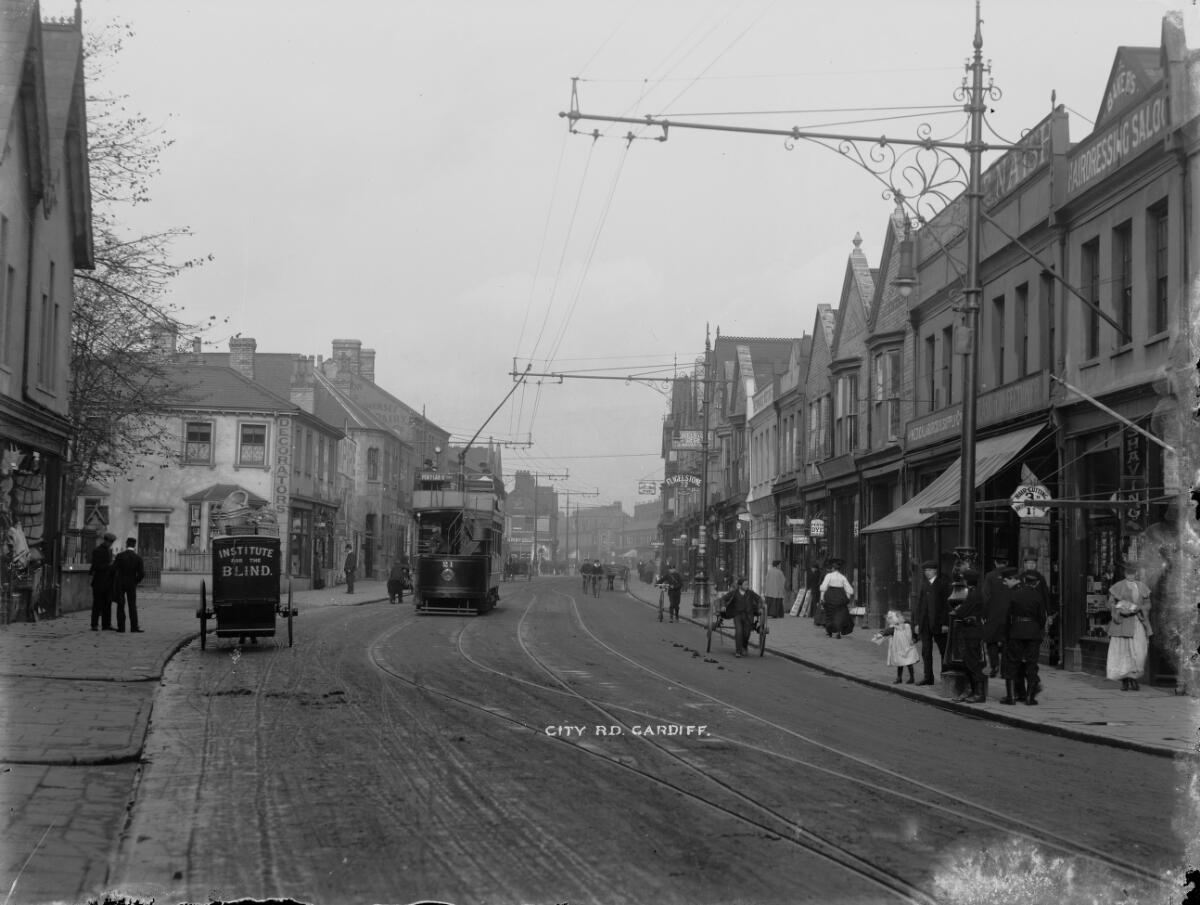
City Road c. 1905, photograph by Martin Ridley

City Road was the subject of a three-part documentary television series, first broadcast on BBC One Wales in July 2016. The series featured several businesses including a hairdressers, a sex shop and a fitness centre. The series was made in partnership with Made Television and also broadcast on Made in Cardiff.
