= Milton High School (Zimbabwe) =

Milton Senior Boys High School
- Bulawayo; Zimbabwe

Information
- Type: Government all-boys
- Motto: Άvδρίζεσθε; Quit ye like men (from 1 Corinthians 16:13)
- Founded: 25 July 1910; 115 years ago
- Headmaster: Similo Ncube
- Enrollment: 900+
- Language: English
- Colors: Plumbago and Oxford blue
- Publication: The Miltonian
- Website: www.miltonhighschoolbyo.com

Milton Senior Boys High School is a government all-boys high school located in Bulawayo, Zimbabwe. It was the first government all-boys school established in Bulawayo. It was founded in 1910 and is named after Sir William Milton, administrator of the British South Africa Company. The school's motto is Greek and derived from the Biblical excerpt from Corinthians, 1 Corinthians 16:13, written by St. Paul to Corinthians in the face of Roman imperialism, and the Authorized Version translates it as "Quit ye like men". Milton school's connection with St. John's (the original Milton) is perpetuated in the new church in Rhodes Street where the central light of a stained glass window in the east transept in memory of an old boy, Alfred Perry, depicts the school's crest and motto.

== History ==
Milton School was founded on 25 July 1910.

== The Milton Address ==
The Milton Address, an annual address delivered to the school, began in 1972 to celebrate the anniversary of the school's founding. The first Milton Address was delivered by Sir Henry MacDonald. Following speakers included the Anglican Bishop of Matabeleland Robert Mercer, economist Tony Hawkins, Mayor of Bulawayo Mike Constandinos, Senator David Coltart. The 75th anniversary address was given by former Prime Minister of Southern Rhodesia Sir Garfield Todd. Subsequent addresses were delivered by notable figures including former President of Zimbabwe Canaan Banana, Anglican Dean of Bulawayo Robin Ewbank, British High Commissioner Sir Ramsay Mellhuish, writer Yvonne Vera, Vice Chancellor of Solusi University Norman Maphosa, and AIDs researcher Riita Dlodlo.

== List of headmasters ==
1. E. D. de Beer (1910–1924)
2. John Banks Brady (1925–1930)
3. H. G. Livingston (1931–1941)
4. L. R. Morgan (1941–1942)
5. William Gebbie (1943–1946)
6. Ball (1946–1950)
7. H. Downing (1950–1955)
8. Cecil Raymond Messiter-Tooze (1956–1963)
9. M. Brett (1964–1969)
10. R. K. Gracie (1970–1980)
11. Erik Andersen (1981–1984)
12. Harry Fincham (1984–1987)
13. J. Mandikate (1988–1995)
14. A. B. S. Senda (1996–2001)
15. D. Swene (2002–2006)
16. Ngwenya (2006–2013)
17. William Ncube (2014–2016)
18. Similo Ncube (2016– )

== Notable alumni ==
- Allan Anderson, Pentecostal minister and theologian
- Lewis Banda, Olympic sprinter
- Kevan Barbour, cricketer and cricket umpire
- Colin Bland, cricketer
- Bobby Chalmers, footballer
- Brian Chari, cricketer
- Keith Dabengwa, cricketer
- John Eppel, writer and poet
- Percy Mansell, cricketer
- Tafadzwa Manyimo, cricketer and rugby player
- Tawanda Manyimo, actor
- Mpumelelo Mbangwa, cricketer and sports presenter
- Thabo Mboyi, cricketer
- Tinashe Mhora, cricketer
- Nkosana Mpofu, cricketer
- Bonaparte Mujuru, cricketer
- Tawanda Mupariwa, cricketer
- Richmond Mutumbami, cricketer
- Njabulo Ncube, cricketer
- Methembe Ndlovu, footballer
- John Nyumbu, cricketer
- Christopher Ridley, cricketer
- Giles Ridley, cricketer
- Chris Rogers, rugby player
- Hendrik Verwoerd, Prime Minister of South Africa
- Brian Vitori, cricketer
- Peter Wilson, cricketer and Rhodes Scholar
