= Allan Anderson (theologian) =

Anglo-Zimbabwean theologian

- Born: Allan Heaton Anderson; 21 September 1949 (age 77); London, England
- Title: Professor of Mission and Pentecostal Studies

Academic background
- Thesis: African Pentecostalism in South Africa: A Missiological Evaluation (1992)
- Doctoral advisor: L. Daneel and Willem Saayman

Academic work
- Discipline: Theology
- Institutions: Tshwane Theological College; University of South Africa; Selly Oak Colleges; University of Birmingham

Allan Anderson (born 21 September 1949) is a British theologian and the Professor of Mission and Pentecostal Studies at the University of Birmingham. He is frequently cited as one of the foremost scholars on Global Pentecostalism.

== Early life and education ==
Anderson was born in London to Salvation Army officers Keith and Gwen Anderson, a Zimbabwean father and an English mother. His father was the son of a fourth generation London Missionary Society (Congregational) minister in Southern Africa, of Scottish and Cape Dutch descent, and his mother was born in Sheffield, England, the daughter of Salvation Army officers originally from South Yorkshire. Anderson was raised in Zimbabwe, and his secondary education was at Gilbert Rennie School in Lusaka (Zambia), Prince Edward School in Harare (then Salisbury) and Milton High School, Bulawayo (Zimbabwe). He studied part-time at the University of South Africa from 1976, obtaining a BTh in 1983, Hons BTh in Missiology in 1985, MTh (a two-year research degree) in 1990, and graduated DTh in September 1992. His master's thesis was entitled "Pneumatology from an African Perspective" (published in 1991 as Moya: The Holy Spirit in an African Context), and his doctoral dissertation was "African Pentecostalism in South Africa: A Missiological Evaluation."

== Academic career ==
Anderson was founder and principal of Tshwane Theological College near Pretoria (1988–95) and part-time researcher at the University of South Africa (1989–95) before joining Selly Oak Colleges, Birmingham, as Director of the Centre for New Religious Movements in 1995. He also became an honorary lecturer and then, from 1999, a lecturer at the University of Birmingham. In 2005, Anderson was awarded a chair in Mission and Pentecostal Studies at the University of Birmingham.

== Ministry ==
Anderson was a full-time pentecostal minister (1973–83), then a baptist and charismatic church minister (1983–95) in South Africa, when he took up a part-time research position at the University of South Africa (1989–95).

== Research and selected publications ==
Anderson's main interests are in the areas of the history, mission and theology of Pentecostalism, with particular interest in Africa and Asia. He is the editor of the peer-reviewed journal published at Equinox, PentecoStudies. He is also a founder-member of the European Research Network on Global Pentecostalism which conducts research in four European universities, and he also serves on the international editorial board of four additional academic journals. His principle works include:

- Anderson, Allan, An Introduction to Pentecostalism: Global Charismatic Christianity (Cambridge, 2004; 2nd ed. 2014).
- _____________, To the Ends of the Earth: Pentecostalism and the Transformation of World Christianity (Oxford, 2013).
- _____________, with David Westerlund, Den världsvida pentekostalismen (Stockholm: Dialogos, 2012).
- _____________, ed., with M. Bergunder, A. Droogers & C. van der Laan, Studying Global Pentecostalism: Theories and Methods (Berkeley: University of California Press, 2010).
- _____________, Spreading Fires: The Missionary Nature of Early Pentecostalism (SCM & Orbis, 2007).
- _____________, El Pentecostalismo: El cristianismo carismatico mundial (Ediciones Akal, 2007).
- _____________, ed. with Edmond Tang, Asian and Pentecostal : The Charismatic Face of Asian Christianity (Regnum 2005).
- _____________, African Reformation: African Initiated Christianity in the 20th Century (Africa World Press, 2001).
- _____________, Zion and Pentecost: The Spirituality and Experience of Pentecostals and Zionists/Apostolics in South Africa (University of South Africa Press, 2000).
- _____________, ed., with Walter J. Hollenweger, Pentecostals After a Century (Sheffield Academic Press, 1999).

Anderson has also written numerous articles for peer-reviewed journals.
