= Aaron J. Ridley =

American atmospheric researcher

- Education: University of Michigan (MS, PhD), Eastern Michigan University (BS)
- Scientific career
- Institutions: University of Michigan
- Academic advisors: C. Robert Clauer, Gang Lu, Geoff Crowley
- Website: aaronridley.wordpress.com

Aaron J. Ridley is an American atmospheric researcher and Professor at the University of Michigan. He is known for his works on magnetosphere-ionosphere coupling. Ridley is a winner of NASA Group Achievement Award (2006).

== See also ==
- Cyclone Global Navigation Satellite System
