= My Song for You (Demi Lovato and Joe Jonas song) =

2010 song by Demi Lovato and Joe Jonas

Song by Demi Lovato & Joe Jonas
- Recorded: 2010
- Genre: Pop, christmas
- Length: 1:52
- Label: Walt Disney
- Songwriters: Kari Kimmel, Scott Krippayne

"My Song for You" (also known as "Song for You" or "Sing My Song for You") is a song by American recording artists Demi Lovato and Joe Jonas. It was composed by Kari Kimmel and Scott Krippayne. The song was not included on an album. On November 28, 2010, Lovato and Jonas performed the song on TV series Sonny with a Chance in the episode "A So Random! Holiday Special".

== Bridgit Mendler and Shane Harper version ==
"My Song for You"

Song by Bridgit Mendler and Shane Harper

from the album Disney Channel Holiday Playlist
- Recorded: 2012
- Genre: Pop; christmas
- Length: 3:21
- Label: Walt Disney
- Songwriters: Scott Krippayne; Kari Kimmel

"My Song for You" is a song by American recording artists Bridgit Mendler and Shane Harper from the Christmas compilation Disney Channel Holiday Playlist in 2012. It was composed by Kari Kimmel and Scott Krippayne. The song peaked at number three on Billboard Holiday Songs.

=== Critical reception ===
James Christopher Monger to AllMusic was positive and said the song has youthful enthusiasm, but hasn't "syrupy strings, gentle pianos, or heavenly choirs", typical of Christmas songs. Karin Elwood to Girls' Life magazine said that "My Song for You" it's the best song on the album and can melt any heart and put feelings. Disney Dreaming said it's cute to hear Mendler and Harper singing together and they loved the song.

=== Live performances ===
On December 2, 2012, Mendler and Harper performed the song on TV series Good Luck Charlie, in the episode A Duncan Christmas. The performance reached the second highest ratings of the season.

=== Chart performance ===
Chart (2012)	Peak position
US Kid Digital Songs (Billboard)	2
US Holiday Songs (Billboard)	3
