= Ella Enchanted (soundtrack) =

Ella Enchanted: Original Soundtrack

Soundtrack album by Various artists
- Released: April 6, 2004
- Recorded: 2003–2004
- Genres: Pop, pop rock, dance pop
- Label: Hollywood
- Producer: Robbie Buchanan

Ella Enchanted: Original Soundtrack is the soundtrack to the 2004 film Ella Enchanted which was released by Hollywood Records. The album features Kelly Clarkson, Jesse McCartney and Raven-Symoné. The film's lead actress, Anne Hathaway, performs three songs on the album including a duet with Jesse McCartney.

== Critical reception ==
Professional ratings
Review scores
Source	Rating
Allmusic	3/5 stars

Writing for Allmusic, Heather Phares noted, "Though the film is technically a Miramax offering, the soundtrack is downright Disney, gathering songs from the studio's stable of prefab teen pop singers". She praised Kelly Clarkson, who "out-sings them all on 'Respect', which, despite its canned-sounding accompaniment, makes the most of her voice". She concluded, "Most of the [album] plays like a souped-up school musical, although that does give it sort of an awkward charm."

== Track listing ==
Ella Enchanted track listing
No.	Title	Performer(s)	Length
1.	"Don't Go Breakin' My Heart"	Jesse McCartney featuring Anne Hathaway	3:10
2.	"It's Not Just Make Believe"	Kari Kimmel	3:07
3.	"True to Your Heart"	Raven	3:44
4.	"Respect"	Kelly Clarkson	2:17
5.	"You Make Me Feel Like Dancing" (remix)	Anne Hathaway	3:20
6.	"Walking on Sunshine"	Jump5	4:06
7.	"Magic"	Stimulator	3:53
8.	"Strange Magic"	Darren Hayes	3:52
9.	"Somebody to Love"	Anne Hathaway	3:23
10.	"Once Upon a Broken Heart"	The Beu Sisters	4:09
11.	"If You Believe"	Andrea Remanda	3:59
12.	"Let Me Entertain You"	Cast	0:39

=== Possible alternate release ===
1. Jesse McCartney and Anne Hathaway - "Don't Go Breakin' My Heart"
2. Kari Kimmel - "It's Not Just Make Believe"
3. Kelly Clarkson - "Respect"
4. Jump5 - "Walking On Sunshine"
5. Raven Symone - "True to Your Heart"
6. Kaci - "I Think I Love You"
7. Anne Hathaway - "You Make Me Feel Like Dancing" (Remix)
8. Anne Hathaway - "Somebody to Love"
9. Andrea Remanda and Bryan Adams - "If You Believe"
10. Darren Hayes - "Strange Magic"
11. Stimulator - "Magic"
12. The Beu Sisters - "Once Upon a Broken Heart"
13. Sean Devel - Score Suite
