= Peter Wilson (cricketer, born 1944) =

South African cricketer and field hockey player

Personal information
- Full name: Peter Robert Bain Wilson
- Born: 31 October 1944 (age 82); Bulawayo, Southern Rhodesia
- Batting: Right-handed
- Bowling: Leg break

Domestic team information
- Years: Team
- 1968–1970: Oxford University

Career statistics
Competition	First-class
Matches	23
Runs scored	664
Batting average	17.47
100s/50s	–/1
Top score	94
Balls bowled	261
Wickets	7
Bowling average	33.28
5 wickets in innings	–
10 wickets in match	–
Best bowling	4/60
Catches/stumpings	9/–
- Source: Cricinfo, 1 June 2020

Peter Robert Bain Wilson (born 31 October 1944) is a South African first-class cricketer and field hockey player.

Wilson was born at Bulawayo in Southern Rhodesia in October 1944. He attended Milton High School, Bulawayo, studied engineering at the University of Cape Town, later studying in England as a Rhodes Scholar at St Edmund Hall at the University of Oxford. While studying at Oxford, he played first-class cricket for Oxford University, making his debut against Gloucestershire at Oxford in 1968. He played first-class cricket for Oxford until 1970, making 23 appearances. Wilson scored a total of 664 runs in his 23 matches, at an average of 17.47 and with a high score of 94. With his leg break bowling, he took 7 wickets with best figures of 4 for 60. In addition to playing cricket for the university, he also represented it and Oxfordshire in field hockey.

Wilson played international hockey for South Africa. Having worked in the oil and mining industries, Wilson set up the African Leadership Institute in 2004.
