= St John Lloyd Catholic Comprehensive School =

Comprehensive school in Llanelli, Wales

Coordinates: 51.6870°N 4.1345°W

St. John Lloyd Catholic Comprehensive School
- Llanelli, Carmarthenshire, Wales, United Kingdom

Information
- Type: Comprehensive
- Motto: In Hoc Signo Vinces "In This Sign You Will Prosper"
- Head teacher: Frances Clegg
- Website: www.stjohnlloyd.co.uk

St. John Lloyd Catholic Comprehensive School is located in Llanelli, Carmarthenshire, Wales. It is a mixed, community comprehensive school of around 500 pupils, catering for all abilities across an age range of 11 to 16 years. It is dedicated to St. John Lloyd, who was executed in Cardiff in 1679 for exercising his priesthood.

The school is situated in Llanelli's Dafen suburb, although pupils are drawn from as far afield as Carmarthen, Pembrey, Burry Port, Kidwelly, and Trimsaran.

The main partner primary schools are:

- St. Mary's School, Dafen
- Halfway Primary, Llanelli
- Old Road Primary, Llanelli
- Pentip Primary, Llanelli

The school also receives a number of pupils from schools outside the catchment area.
