= Philip Evans and John Lloyd =

Welsh Roman Catholic priests, martyrs and saints

Saint Philip Evans S.J.
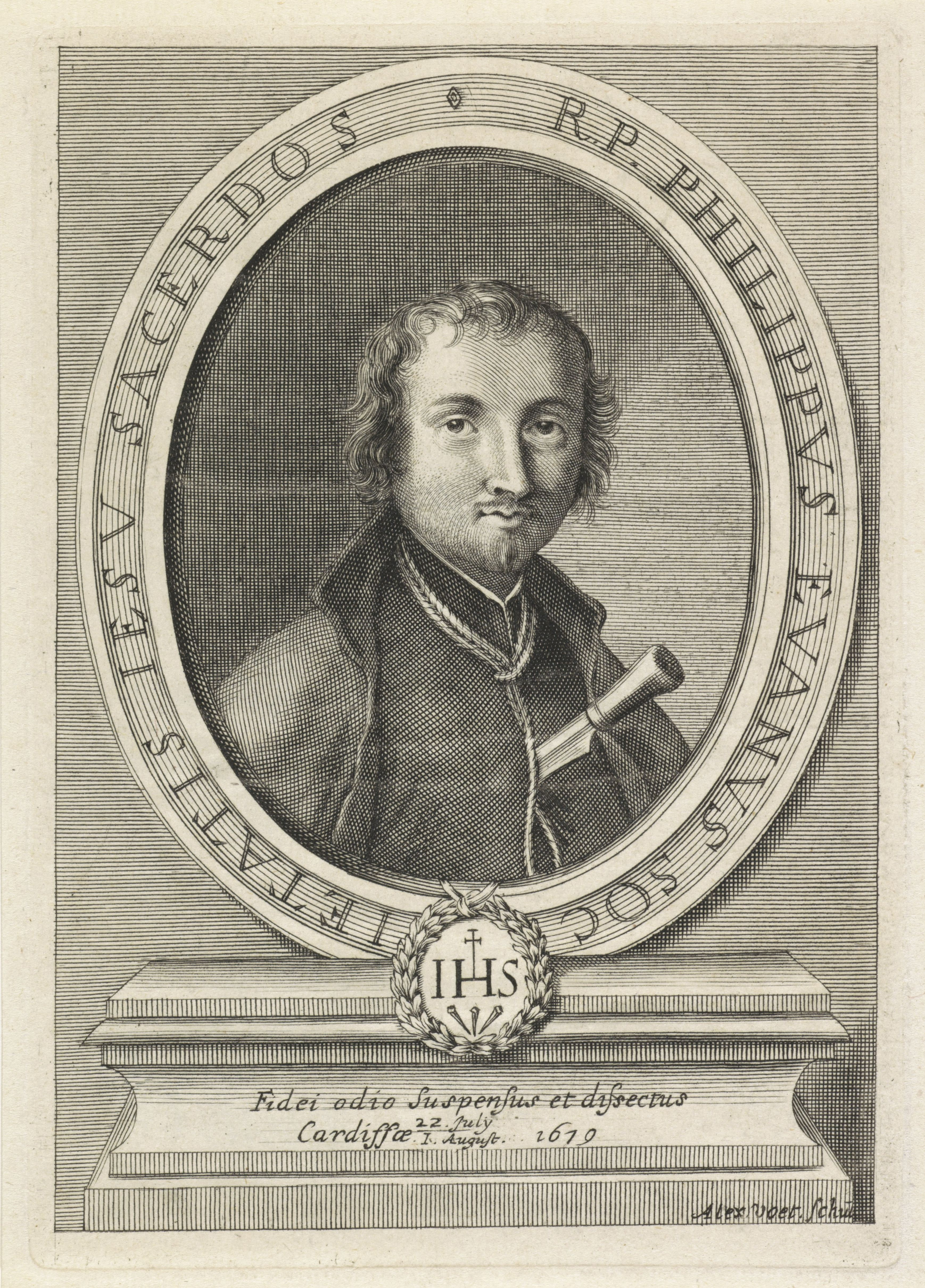

Priest and Martyr
- Born: c. 1645; Monmouth, Wales
- Died: 22 July 1679 (aged 33 - 34); Pwllhalog, near Cardiff, Wales
- Venerated in: Roman Catholic Church
- Beatified: 15 December 1929 by Pope Pius XI
- Canonized: 25 October 1970 by Pope Paul VI
- Feast: 23 July, 25 October
- Attributes: noose around neck, knife in chest, harp
- Patronage: Tennis, tennis players

Philip Evans, SJ and John Lloyd were Welsh Catholic priests killed in the aftermath of the alleged Popish Plot. They are among the Forty Martyrs of England and Wales.

== Philip Evans ==
Philip Evans was born in Monmouth in 1645, and educated at Jesuit College of St. Omer (in Artois, now in France). He joined the Society of Jesus in Watten on 7 September 1665, and was ordained at Liège (now in Belgium) and sent to South Wales as a missionary in 1675.

He worked in Wales for four years, and despite the official anti-Catholic policy no action was taken against him. When the Oates' scare swept the country both Lloyd and Evans were caught up in the aftermath. In November 1678 John Arnold, of Llanvihangel Court near Abergavenny, a justice of the peace and hunter of priests, offered a reward of £200 (equivalent to £40,000 in 2025) for his arrest.

Despite the manifest dangers Evans steadfastly refused to leave his flock. He was arrested at the home of Christopher Turberville at Sker, Glamorgan, on 4 December 1678. Ironically the posse which arrested him is said to have been led by Turberville's brother, the notorious priest hunter Edward Turberville.

== John Lloyd ==
Saint John Lloyd
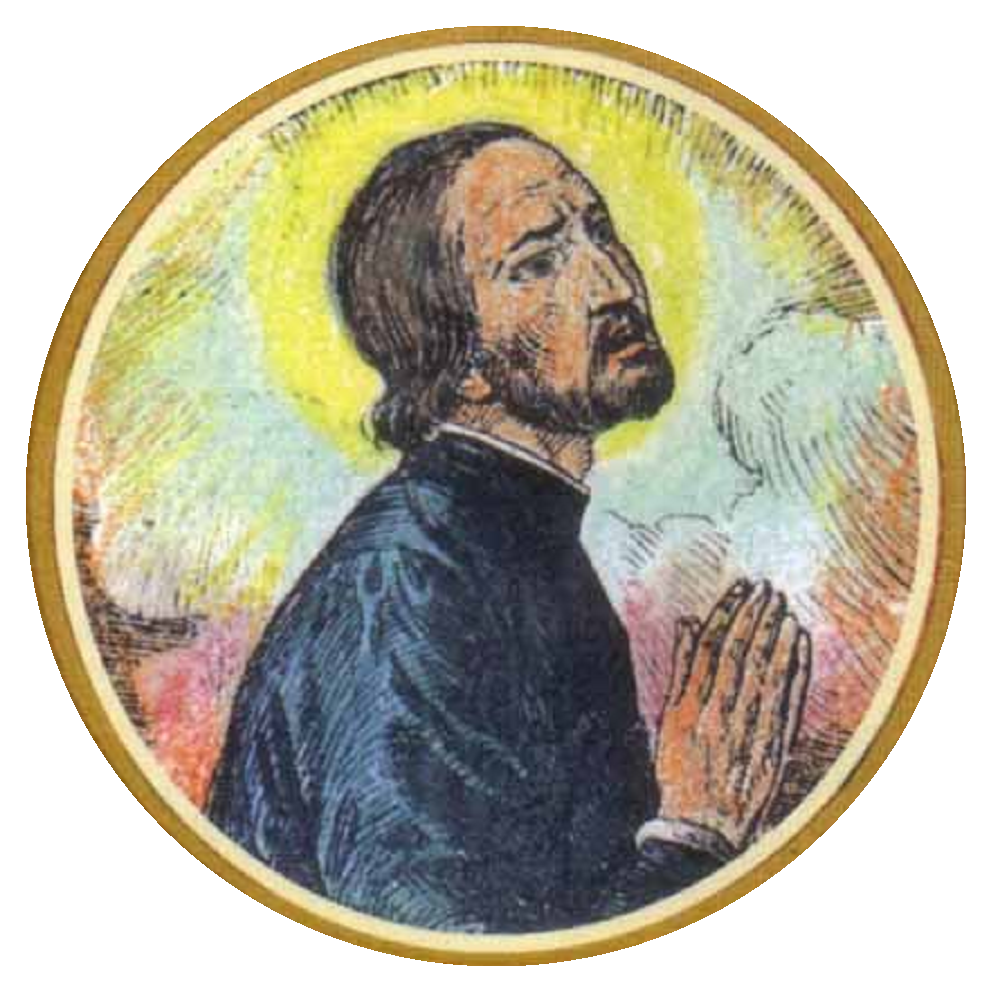

Priest and Martyr
- Born: Breconshire, Wales
- Died: 22 July 1679 (aged 33 - 34); Pwllhalog, near Cardiff, Wales
- Venerated in: Roman Catholic Church
- Beatified: 15 December 1929 by Pope Pius XI
- Canonized: 25 October 1970 by Pope Paul VI
- Feast: 23 July, 25 October

John Lloyd, a Welshman and a secular priest (a priest not associated with any religious order), was a Breconshire man. He was educated at St. Omer's and from 1649 at the English College, Valladolid, Spain. He took the 'missionary oath' on 16 October 1649 to participate in the English Mission. Sent to Wales in 1654 to minister to covert Catholics, he lived his vocation while constantly on the run for 24 years. He was arrested at Turberville's house at Penlline, Glamorgan, on 20 November 1678, and imprisoned in Cardiff Gaol. There he was joined by the Jesuit, Philip Evans.

== Trial ==
They waited five months before going to trial on May 3, 1679 because the prosecution could not find witnesses to testify that they were indeed priests. Both priests were brought to trial in Cardiff on Monday, 5 May 1679. Neither was charged with being associated with the plot concocted by Oates. Nonetheless, they were tried for being priests and coming to England and Wales contrary to the provisions of Jesuits, etc. Act 1584, and were declared guilty of treason for exercising their priesthood.

== Executions ==
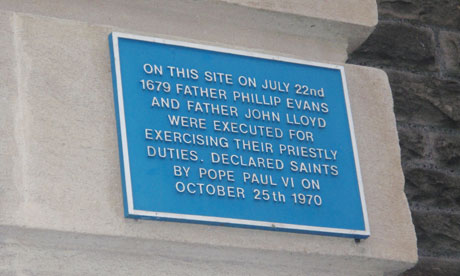
Plaque marking the execution site

The executions took so long to be scheduled that it began to appear that they might not take place. The priests were allowed a good deal of liberty, even to leaving the prison for recreation. The executions took place in Pwllhalog, near Cardiff, on 22 July 1679. Two plaques mark the site at what is now the junction where City Road, Crwys Road and Richmond Road meet in Roath, Cardiff, still known as "Death Junction".

Evans was the first to die. He addressed the gathering in both Welsh and English saying, ‘Adieu, Father Lloyd! Though only for a little time, for we shall soon meet again'. Lloyd spoke very briefly: "I never was a good speaker in my life. I shall only say that I die in the true Catholic and apostolic faith, according to these words in the Creed, I believe in the holy Catholic Church; and with those three virtues: faith, hope and charity."

== Canonisation and feast day ==
On 25 October 1970, both John Lloyd and Philip Evans were canonised by Pope Paul VI. Although they died on 22 July, this date is kept by the Catholic Church as the feast day of Mary Magdalen, so their joint feast day was assigned to 23 July. The same date is the assigned day of Bridget of Sweden, who was later designated one of six patron saints of Europe by Pope John Paul II. This means that while churches dedicated to John Lloyd or Philip Evans can keep their feast on 23 July, other churches must commemorate Bridget on that date. A voluntary celebration for John Lloyd and Philip Evans may be kept on a nearby date at the discretion of local communities.

The collective feast day of the Forty Martyrs of England and Wales was formerly kept on 25 October. In England they are now celebrated together with beatified martyrs on 4 May. In Wales, 25 October is the feast of the "Six Welsh Martyrs and their companions".

The pair are commemorated within Cardiff by two stained-glass windows at the St Peter's Church, off City Road.

== Relics ==
In 1878 two human skulls were discovered in a wooden box, stored in the attic of a Jesuit priest’s house in Holywell. The box contained a mix of other bones, including various leg bones that were wrapped in a woman's blouse and a coccyx. The Stonyhurst College announced in April 2021 that they believed they had identified that the bones belonged to John Lloyd and Philip Evans. Previously, the same bones were previously believed to be of John Plessington, with the Bishop of Shrewsbury attempting to raise funds to conduct DNA testing.

== Dedictions ==
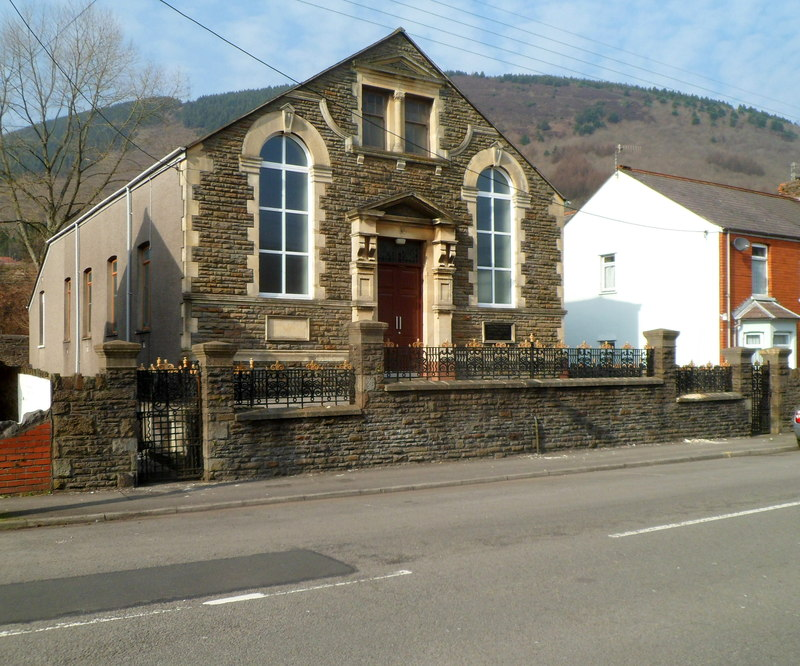
St Philip Evans Church, Cwmafan

=== St Philip Evans ===
- St Philip Evans Church, Llanedeyrn, Cardiff (Roman Catholic)
- St Philip Evans Catholic Primary School, Llanedyrn, Cardiff
- St Philip Evans Church, Cwmafan, Neath Port Talbot (Roman Catholic)

=== St John Lloyd ===
- St John Lloyd Church, Rumney, Cardiff (Roman Catholic)
- St John Lloyd Catholic Comprehensive School, Llanelli
- St John Lloyd R.C. Primary School, Trowbridge, Cardiff

== See also ==
- Richard Gwyn
- John Jones (martyr)
- John Roberts (martyr)
- David Lewis (Jesuit priest)

== Other sources ==
- Encyclopædia Britannica, 15th Edition, 1992.
