= Disney Channel Holiday Playlist =

Compilation album by Disney Channel stars
- Released: October 2, 2012
- Recorded: 2012
- Genres: Pop; holiday; pop rock; teen pop
- Length: 29:17
- Label: Walt Disney
- Producer: Matthew Gerrard

Disney Channel stars chronology
Disney Channel Playlist (2009)	Disney Channel Holiday Playlist (2012)	Make Your Mark: Ultimate Playlist (2012)

Disney Channel Holiday Playlist (titled Family® Holiday Playlist in Canada) is a 2012 holiday music album released on October 2, 2012 in the United States, and November 2, 2012 in Canada. The album features musical artists associated or popularized by Disney Channel like Bridgit Mendler, Bella Thorne, Zendaya, Adam Hicks, Ross Lynch, McClain Sisters and Coco Jones singing their own versions of holiday songs. Some songs were recorded prior to the production of this album, while others were recorded specifically for it.

== Track listing ==
No.	Title	Recording artist(s)	Length
1.	"Shake Santa Shake" (from Shake It Up)	Zendaya	2:56
2.	"Rockin' Around the Christmas Tree"	Bella Thorne	2:12
3.	"Christmas Soul" (from Austin & Ally)	Ross Lynch	3:04
4.	"My Song for You" (from Good Luck Charlie)	Bridgit Mendler and Shane Harper	3:21
5.	"Jingle Bell Rock"	McClain Sisters	2:07
6.	"Winter Wonderland"	Olivia Holt	2:06
7.	"Christmas Is Coming"	Ross Lynch and R5	3:08
8.	"All I Want for Christmas Is You"	Caroline Sunshine	3:41
9.	"Christmas Night"	Coco Jones	3:03
10.	"Happy Universal Holidays" (from Zeke and Luther)	Adam Hicks featuring Ryan Newman	2:35

Walmart exclusive bonus track
No.	Title	Recording artist(s)	Length
11.	"Deck the Halls"	Debby Ryan	2:24

Canada exclusive bonus track
No.	Title	Recording artist(s)	Length
11.	"Santa Claus Is Coming to Town"	Veronica	3:13

== Charts ==
Chart (2012)	Peak position
U.S. Billboard 200	180
U.S. Billboard Holiday Albums	20
U.S. Billboard Kid Albums	6
