= Archie Ridley =

New Zealand cricketer (1869–1950)

Personal information
- Full name: Archibald Ernest Ridley
- Born: 22 September 1869; Chepstow, Monmouthshire, England
- Died: 1 February 1950 (aged 80); Christchurch, New Zealand
- Batting: Right-handed
- Relatives: Harry Ridley (brother)

Domestic team information
- Years: Team
- 1889-90 to 1909-10: Canterbury

Career statistics
Competition	First-class
Matches	25
Runs scored	859
Batting average	21.47
100s/50s	0/3
Top score	82
Catches/stumpings	24/–
- Source: Cricinfo, 31 October 2017

Archibald Ernest Ridley (22 September 1869 – 1 February 1950) was a New Zealand cricketer who played first-class cricket for Canterbury from 1890 to 1910 and represented New Zealand in the 1890s.

== Personal life ==
Born in Monmouthshire in 1869, Archie Ridley was one of nine children of the Rev. Morris Samuel Ridley. He was educated in England and in New Zealand. He took up employment with Dalgety and Co. Ltd in Christchurch. He later worked on his own in Christchurch as an insurance broker.

== Cricket career ==
A middle-order batsman, Ridley played several seasons for Canterbury in the early 1890s with only moderate success. However, he was "Canterbury's outstanding outfield of the day", who took many spectacular catches. In the match against Otago in 1894-95, his running one-handed catch on the boundary was described by the Lyttelton Times as "the most sensational deep-field catch ever made in Christchurch".

He was selected to play for a New Zealand XV against the touring Australians early in the 1896-97 season, making 23 (the top score) and 20 in a loss for New Zealand. A few weeks later he played a first-class match for New Zealand against the visiting Queensland team, which New Zealand won. He scored 9 and 30.

In the match against Otago in 1897-98 Canterbury needed 155 to win and were 70 for five before Ridley, 76 not out, took Canterbury to a four-wicket victory helped by the lower-order batsmen. His was the highest score in the match; only two other batsmen had reached 30.

He was not selected in New Zealand's team to tour Australia in 1898-99. Dan Reese, who toured in the team, said of the team selection that "the greatest mistake [was] the omission of Archie Ridley of Canterbury". In March 1900, after Ridley top-scored with 63 for Canterbury in a two-day match against the touring Melbourne Cricket Club, the Australian Test cricketer Hugh Trumble said he was one of the best batsmen in New Zealand.

In November 1908, playing for his club Linwood in the Christchurch competition, Ridley scored 217 not out in three and a half hours in a total of 402, playing strokes "brilliantly yet neatly all round the wicket, his cutting and gliding being a treat". It was a record score for the competition until Carl Beal scored 242 not out in 1915. A few weeks later Ridley made 82 (his highest first-class score) and 26 in Canterbury's victory over Wellington.
