= Observatory for Heteroscale Magnetosphere-Ionosphere Coupling =

The Observatory for Heteroscale Magnetosphere-Ionosphere Coupling (OHMIC) is a mission concept proposed in 2011 to NASA's Explorers program consisting of a pair of spacecraft flying in formation studying the energy powering space weather. The Principal Investigator for the mission is James Burch of the Southwest Research Institute in San Antonio, Texas. The concept was not selected for development at that time.

The mission proposed to investigate how magnetospheric electromagnetic energy flows downward to power aurorae, and study how ion outflows are initiated and modify the underlying ionosphere. Specifically, it would "investigate the coupling of Earth's magnetosphere and ionosphere focusing on the conversion of electromagnetic energy into particle energy in auroral acceleration regions." To this end, the two spacecraft would measure electron distributions, ion distributions, and vector electric and magnetic fields for determining how charged-particle acceleration and injection vary in time and space.
