= Giles Ridley =

Personal information
- Full name: Giles Nicholas Spencer Ridley
- Born: 24 November 1944 (age 81); Bulawayo, Rhodesia
- Batting: Right-handed
- Bowling: Slow left-arm orthodox
- Relatives: Christopher Ridley (brother)

Domestic team information
- Years: Team
- 1965–1968: Oxford University
- 1965: Kent
- 1968: MCC
- 1969–1972: Oxfordshire
- 1971–1972: Minor Counties
- 1972: Minor Counties South

Career statistics
Competition	First-class	List A
Matches	45	6
Runs scored	889	43
Batting average	14.81	7.16
100s/50s	0/1	0/0
Top score	50*	29
Balls bowled	8,150	228
Wickets	123	2
Bowling average	24.80	56.00
5 wickets in innings	2	0
10 wickets in match	0	0
Best bowling	7/110	1/22
Catches/stumpings	40/–	1/–
- Source: Cricinfo, 9 August 2011

Giles Nicholas Spencer Ridley (born 27 November 1944) is a former English cricketer. Ridley was a right-handed batsman who bowled slow left-arm orthodox.

== Life and career ==
Giles Ridley was born in Bulawayo, Rhodesia, and educated at Milton High School in Bulawayo before going to Oxford to study geography at Pembroke College as a Rhodes Scholar.

He made his first-class debut for Oxford University against Gloucestershire in 1965. He made 40 further first-class appearances for the university, the last of which came against Cambridge University in 1968. In his 41 first-class matches for the university, he scored 799 runs at an average of 14.26, with a high score of 50 not out. This score, his only first-class fifty, came against the touring West Indians in 1966. With the ball, he took 121 wickets at a bowling average of 23.87, with best figures of 7/110. These figures, one of two five wicket hauls he took, came against Gloucestershire on debut in 1965. Only Giles Toogood has taken 7 or more wickets in an innings for Oxford University since.

While studying at Pembroke College, Ridley also made single first-class appearance for Kent against Gloucestershire in the 1965 County Championship. He scored 10 runs in the match, but went wicket-less with the ball. Following his final match for the university in 1968, he proceeded to tour Ireland with the Marylebone Cricket Club, playing a single first-class match against Ireland on the tour. He went wicket-less in the Irish first-innings, but took the wicket of Michael Ridley in the Irish second-innings. In the Marylebone Cricket Club's only innings, he scored 9 runs before being dismissed by Dougie Goodwin. In 1969, he joined Oxfordshire, who he made his debut for against Buckinghamshire in the Minor Counties Championship. He played Minor counties cricket for Oxfordshire from 1969 to 1972, making 28 Minor Counties Championship appearances. He made his List A debut against Worcestershire in the 1970 Gillette Cup. In this match, he was dismissed for a duck by Vanburn Holder. He made a further List A appearance for Oxfordshire, against Durham in the 1972 Gillette Cup.

Playing for Oxfordshire allowed him to represent the Minor Counties cricket team, who he made 2 first-class appearances for. The first of these came against the touring Indians in 1971. In this match, he wasn't required to bat in the Minor Counties first-innings, while in their second-innings he scored 35 runs before being dismissed by Ashok Mankad. In the Indians first-innings he took the wicket of Abbas Baig for the cost of 59 runs from 18 overs. The second of these came against the touring Australians in 1972. In this match, he bowled 3 wicket-less in the Australians only innings. With the bat, Ridley scored 6 unbeaten runs in the Minor Counties first-innings, while in their second-innings he scored 30 runs, before being dismissed by John Inverarity. He also played List A cricket for Minor Counties South, making his debut for the team in the 1972 Benson & Hedges Cup against Somerset. He made 3 further appearances in that season's competition. In his 4 matches for the team, he scored 42 runs at an average of 10.50, with a high score of 29. With the ball, he took 2 wickets at an average of 43.00, with best figures of 1/22.

His brother, Christopher, also played first-class cricket for Oxford University.
