= Harry Ridley (cricketer) =

New Zealand cricketer

Personal information
- Full name: Harry Clifford Ridley
- Born: 1868; Chepstow, Monmouthshire, England
- Died: 11 January 1949 (aged 80); Christchurch, New Zealand
- Role: Batsman
- Relatives: Archie Ridley (brother)

Domestic team information
- Years: Team
- 1891–92 to 1904–05: Canterbury

Career statistics
Competition	First-class
Matches	18
Runs scored	611
Batting average	19.70
100s/50s	0/1
Top score	52
Catches/stumpings	8/–
- Source: Cricinfo, 20 October 2020

Harry Clifford Ridley (1868 – 11 January 1949) was a New Zealand cricketer who played 18 matches of first-class cricket for Canterbury between 1892 and 1905.

Harry Ridley was one of nine children of the Rev. Morris Samuel Ridley, who brought his family from Monmouthshire to Christchurch in the 1880s. He was an opening batsman, reliable and with a strong defence, an excellent runner between wickets, and a good fieldsman who could also keep wicket. He played for the Lancaster Park club in Christchurch.

Ridley's highest first-class score was 52 against Wellington in 1896–97. He scored 46 (in an opening partnership of 123 with Len Cuff) and 14 not out when Canterbury beat Wellington in 1894–95. His younger brother Archie also had a long career for Canterbury and represented New Zealand.

Ridley worked for 44 years for the Christchurch Gas Company, the last 40 years as sales manager until he retired in 1934.
