= Aaron Ridley =

British philosopher

- Born: 31 July 1962 (age 64)

Academic background
- Education: University of Cambridge (PhD)
- Thesis: Expression in music (1990)

Academic work
- Discipline: philosophy
- Institutions: University of Southampton

Aaron Ridley (born 31 July 1962) is a British philosopher and Professor of Philosophy at the University of Southampton. He is known for his works on aesthetics, particularly the philosophy of music, and on Nietzsche.

== Books ==
- The Deed is Everything: Nietzsche on Will and Action. Oxford University Press. 2018
- (ed.) Arguing about art: contemporary philosophical debates. (Arguing About Philosophy). Routledge. 2007
- Routledge Philosophy Guidebook to Nietzsche on Art. (Routledge Philosophy Guidebooks). Routledge. 2007
- The Philosophy of Music: Theme and Variations. Edinburgh University Press. 2004
- Beginning Bioethics. Palgrave Macmillan. 1998
- Nietzsche's Conscience: Six Character Studies from the Genealogy. Cornell University Press. 1998
- R.G. Collingwood: a Philosophy of Art. Orion Books. 1998
- Music, Value and the Passions. Cornell University Press. 1995
- (ed.) The philosophy of art: readings ancient and modern. McGraw-Hill. 1995
