= Christopher Ridley =

South African cricketer

Personal information
- Full name: Christopher Jonathan Ben Ridley
- Born: 17 June 1946; Bulawayo, Matabeleland, Southern Rhodesia
- Died: 10 September 2009 (aged 63); Cape Town, Western Cape, South Africa
- Batting: Right-handed
- Bowling: Right-arm medium-fast
- Relatives: Giles Ridley (brother)

Domestic team information
- Years: Team
- 1971: Oxford University

Career statistics
| Competition | First-class |
|---|---|
| Matches | 6 |
| Runs scored | 88 |
| Batting average | 11.00 |
| 100s/50s | –/– |
| Top score | 23 |
| Balls bowled | 654 |
| Wickets | 3 |
| Bowling average | 118.66 |
| 5 wickets in innings | – |
| 10 wickets in match | – |
| Best bowling | 2/70 |
| Catches/stumpings | 4/– |
- Source: Cricinfo, 30 June 2020

Christopher Jonathan Ben Ridley (17 June 1946 – 10 September 2009) was a Rhodesian-born South African first-class cricketer.

== Life and career ==
Ridley was born at Bulawayo in Southern Rhodesia in June 1946. He was educated at Milton High School, before studying in England at Keble College, Oxford. While studying at Oxford he played first-class cricket for Oxford University in 1971, making six appearances. Ridley scored 88 runs in his six matches, with a high score of 23. With his right-arm medium-fast bowling, Ridley took 3 wickets at an expensive average of 118.66 runs apiece per wicket.

Ridley later emigrated to South Africa, where he died at Cape Town in September 2009. His brother, Giles, was a Rhodes Scholar who also played first-class cricket for Oxford University.
