= James Ridley (footballer) =

English footballer

Personal information
- Full name: James Ridley
- Date of birth: 1889
- Place of birth: Newcastle upon Tyne, England
- Position: Outside left

Senior career*
Years	Team	Apps	(Gls)
- Byker East End
- Willington Athletic
1907–1911	Newcastle United	17	(2)
1911	Nottingham Forest	4	(1)
- Wallsend
- Newcastle City
- Ashington
1914	Hartlepools United	1	(0)
- Wallsend
- * Club domestic league appearances and goals

James Ridley (born 1889; date of death unknown) was an English professional footballer who played in the Football League for Newcastle United and Nottingham Forest as an outside left.

== Personal life ==
Ridley served as a corporal in the Royal Engineers during the First World War.

== Career statistics ==
Appearances and goals by club, season and competition
Club	Season	League			FA Cup		Total	
Club	Season	Division	Apps	Goals	Apps	Goals	Apps	Goals
Newcastle United	1907–08	First Division	7	0	0	0	7	0
Newcastle United	1908–09	First Division	5	1	0	0	5	1
Newcastle United	1909–10	First Division	2	0	0	0	2	0
Newcastle United	1910–11	First Division	3	1	0	0	3	1
Newcastle United	Total		17	2	0	0	17	2
Nottingham Forest	1910–11	First Division	4	1	―		4	1
Hartlepools United	1914–15	North Eastern League	1	0	0	0	1	0
Career total			22	3	0	0	22	3
