= Sebastian Claude Ridley =

British composer and organist

Sebastian Claude Ridley (31 December 1853 – April 1924) was an English classical organist, pianist, and composer born in West Derby, Liverpool, England on 31 December 1853. He studied under his father William Ridley and was assistant organist at St Mary's Church, West Derby, Liverpool from 1865 to 1870.

In 1870, he was appointed organist of St. John's, Tue Brook. In 1878 he moved to the Liverpool Seaman's Orphanage, latterly Newsham Park Hospital. In 1892 he moved to Renshaw Street Unitarian Chapel. In 1894 he moved to Great George Street Congregational Chapel. He acted as choirmaster at St. Cuthbert's (1883), and St. Chad's (1887).

He was conductor of Banner's Oratorio Choir in 1883. As an organ player he gave recitals at the Royal Albert Hall, Kensington, St. George's Hall, Liverpool and at various provincial exhibitions.

His compositions include a Church Service in G (unison) and Prize hymn tunes. He wrote many popular songs, notably including "The Wrecker" "Clymene" and "Fairy wings". He died in April 1924 at his home in Egremont and was buried at Anfield Cemetery
