= Dave Ridley =

Welsh footballer

Personal information
- Full name: David George Henry Ridley
- Date of birth: 16 December 1916
- Place of birth: Pontypridd, Wales
- Date of death: 13 September 1998 (aged 81)
- Place of death: Pontypridd, Wales
- Position: Centre forward

Senior career*
Years	Team	Apps	(Gls)
194?–1945	Bedford Town	0	(0)
1945–1946	Millwall	0	(0)
1946–1947	Brighton & Hove Albion	5	(0)
1947–1948	Bedford Town	15	(4)
1948–19??	Merthyr Tydfil		
- Ton Pentre
- Pembroke Borough
- * Club domestic league appearances and goals

David George Henry Ridley (16 December 1916 – 13 September 1998), known as Dave or Dai Ridley, was a Welsh professional footballer who played as a centre forward in the Football League for Brighton & Hove Albion.

== Life and career ==
Ridley was born in Pontypridd, Wales, in 1916. He played local football before signing for Millwall in early 1945. He played for them in the 1945–46 FA Cup, and scored once, but moved on at the end of the season to Brighton & Hove Albion for a £400 fee. He suffered knee cartilage problems during his season at Brighton, and made only five appearances in the Third Division South. He then decided to give up full-time football, and signed for Southern League club Bedford Town, where he spent a 1947–48 season again disrupted by injury. Playing alongside his brother Frank, Ridley scored 12 goals from 22 appearances in all competitions, which included 5 of Bedford's 7 in the FA Cup against Eynesbury Rovers. He then returned to Wales where he played for Merthyr Tydfil, Ton Pentre and Pembroke Borough and worked in a power station. Ridley died in Pontypridd in 1998 at the age of 81.
