= Malcolm Ridley =

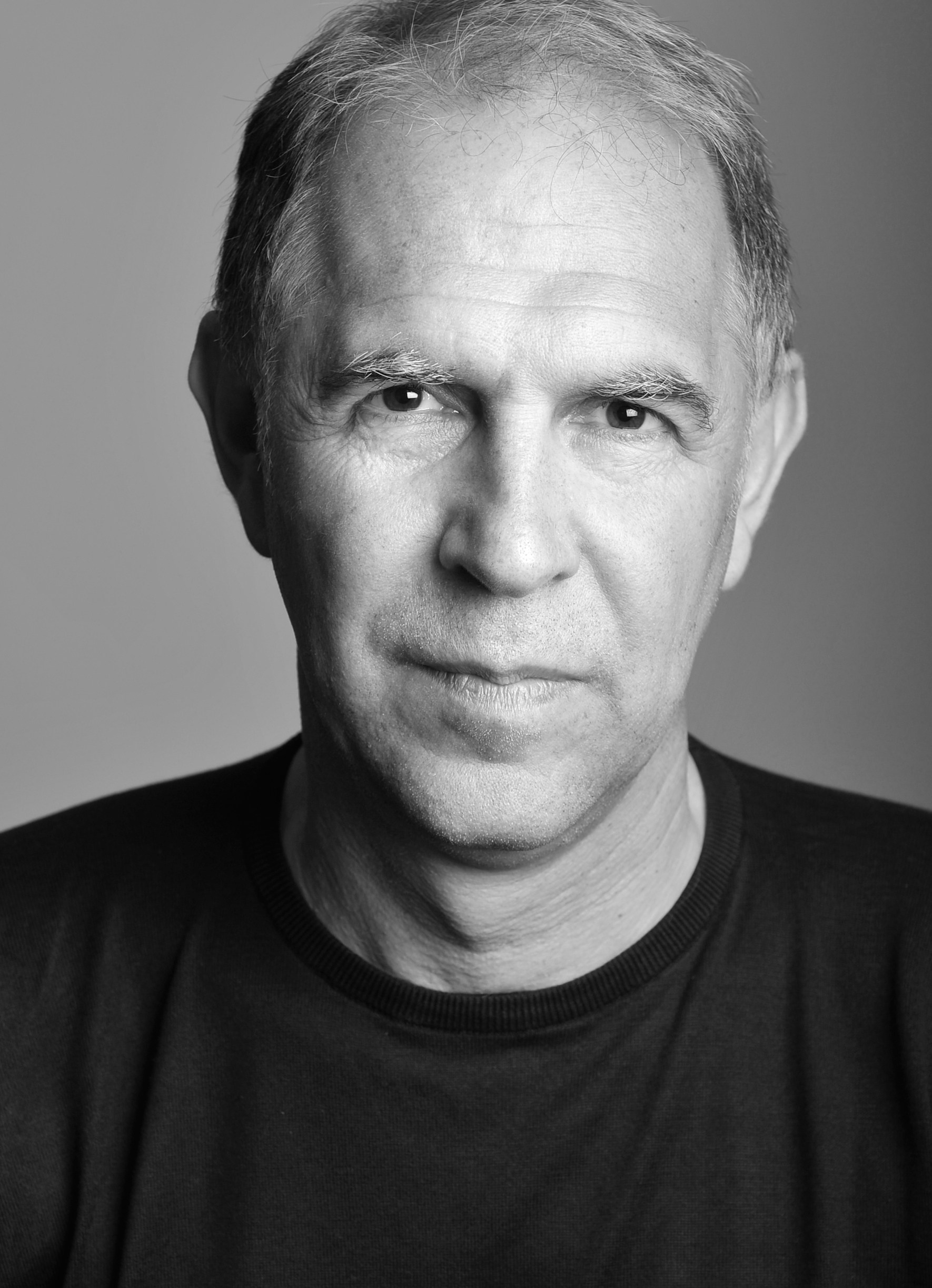
- Born: 1962 (age 63–64); Stanley, County Durham
- Occupation: Actor

Malcolm Ridley (born 1962) is an English actor and writer.

== Career ==
In 1995 Malcolm Ridley played the title role in Molière's George Dandin, for Red Shift Theatre Company. Touring nationally and at the Cochrane Theatre in London. Directed by Jonathan Holloway and Toby Sedgwick, adapted by Robert Bolt.

Between 1993 and 1997 Ridley performed and co-devised three productions Directed by Improbable theatre's award-winning director-designer partnership of Phelim McDermott and Julian Crouch. Servant of Two Masters (Goldoni Festival Venice and Rome) and The Hunchback of Notre-Dame at the West Yorkshire Playhouse and A Midsummer Night's Dream (TMA Best Touring Production Award) for the English Shakespeare Company.

== Roles ==
- (1996) Schmucks by Roy Smiles at Battersea Arts Centre, Directed by the BAC's former Artistic Director Paul Blackman. Schmucks explores the nature of comedy, via a fictitious meeting between the ghosts of Lenny Bruce and Groucho Marx. Their aim is to console and teach a struggling stand-up comic Joey Valis. But instead argue about what audiences need & artistic integrity.
- (2000) The Old Curiosity Shop adapted by Stephen Sharkey, Southwark Playhouse, Directed by Erica Whyman
- (2001) He performed in Having a Ball by Alan Bleasdale. Directed by David Grindley and starring Sara Crowe, Robert Duncan and Michael Medwin for Birmingham Rep. and a national tour of the UK.
- (2003) Electra at The Gate Theatre, Notting Hill, London. Directed By Erica Whyman
- (2005) Ridley performed as "Hamlet the Talking Elephant" in The Firework Maker's Daughter by Philip Pullman for Told By An Idiot Theatre Company at the Lyric Hammersmith and a European tour, Directed by Told by An Idiot's co-founder and co-artistic director Paul Hunter.
- (2006) Ridley acted in the Sir Peter Hall (director) production of William Shakespeare's Measure for Measure. at the Theatre Royal, Bath. The production was invited to Stratford-upon-Avon as part of the Royal Shakespeare Company's Complete Works Festival. The cast included Andrea Riseborough & Richard Dormer. As part of the season, Riseborough & Dormer appeared in August Strindberg's Miss Julie. A new adaptation by Frank McGuinness, directed by Rachel O’Riordan.
- (2006) Performed at the Apollo Theatre in London's West End in Mary Stuart Directed by Phyllida Lloyd (Mamma Mia!) starring Harriet Walter, Janet McTeer.
- (2007) Performed in One Flew Over The Cuckoo's Nest Direction by Clwyd Theatr Cymru's Artistic Director Tamara Harvey. Toured the UK following its hit run in London's West End at the Garrick Theatre. Starring Shane Richie and Sophie Ward.
- (2008) Ridley performed as part of the Donmar West End company in the highly acclaimed production of Anton Chekhov's Ivanov adapted by Sir Tom Stoppard, at London's Wyndham's Theatre; part of the Donmar West End season: playing opposite Kenneth Branagh, Gina McKee, Kevin McNally, Malcolm Sinclair, Andrea Riseborough and Lucy Briers. Directed by the Donmar Warehouse artistic director Michael Grandage. Other productions in the season were Hamlet with Jude Law, Madam De Sade with Judi Dench and Twelfth Night with Sir Derek Jacobi.

Between 2009 and 2013 Ridley acted in over 1200 performances of The National Theatre's production of War Horse by Michael Morpurgo and Directed by Tom Morris and Marianne Elliott at the New London Theatre Drury Lane, acting the roles of Sgt Allen, Manfred and Ted Narracott.

- (2018) Ridley played Harrison Howell in Opera North's critically acclaimed production of Kiss Me Kate. Directed by Jo Davies. Revival Director Ed Goggins. Choreography by Will Tuckett . Conducted by James Holmes.

=== Film, television and radio ===
Date	Character	Production	Director
2025	DI Luke Watson	Exemplar Series 2 BBC Radio 4	Polly Thomas & Jade Lewis
2018	Abraham Denson Manchester & Salford Yeomanry	Peterloo	Mike Leigh
2019	Roger	The Good Neighbour	Jonathan Reid-Edwards
2007	Carl Clarke(Guest Lead)	The Bill	Olivia Lictenstein
2006	Doctor Andrew Holland(Sex Therapist)	The West Wittering Affair	David Scheinmann
2003	Seg. Barker	SUSPICION	Jamie Payne
2001	Clerk of the Court	CLOSE & INNOCENT	Rene Rye
1999	Peter's Clerk	KAVANAGH QC - SERIES V	Tristram Powell
1998	'Paranoid Man'	Games World	Steve Wright
!998	Lt. Frewer	The Dance of Shiva	Jamie Payne

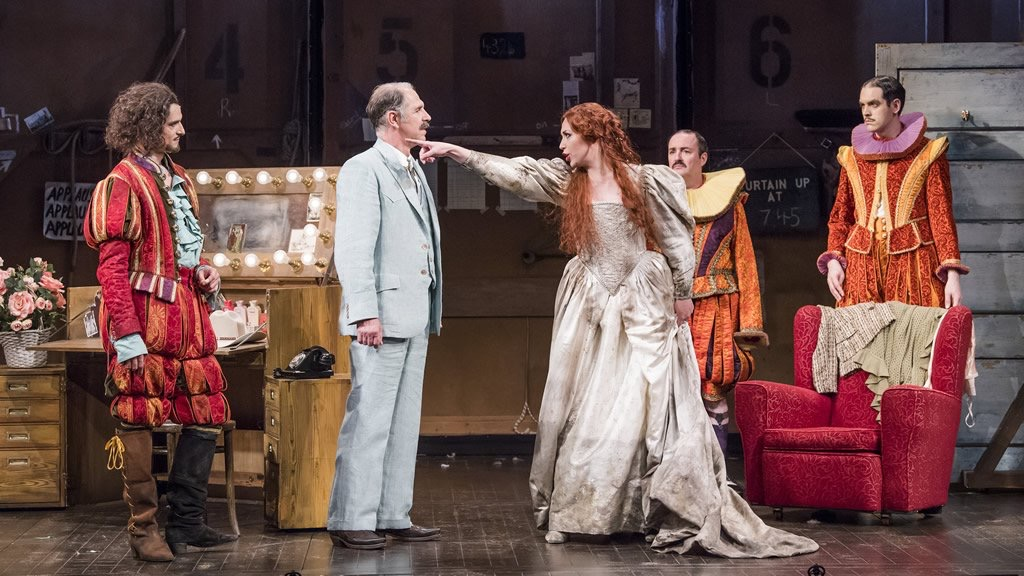
Kiss Me Kate Opera North . Dir. Jo Davies. Revival Dir.Ed Goggin. Conductor James Holmes.left to right - Quirijn de Lang, Malcolm Ridley, Stephanie Corley, Joseph Shovelton, John Savournin
