= Jessica Ridley =

Canadian singer-songwriter (born 1985)

- Born: 14 March 1985 (age 41); Calgary, Alberta, Canada
- Genre: Country
- Occupation: Singer-songwriter
- Instruments: Vocals, guitar, piano, mandolin
- Years active: 2007–present
- Label: Independent
- Website: www.jessicaridley.com

Jessica Ridley (born 1985) is a Canadian singer-songwriter who won Bud United presents The Big Time, a reality show that aired in North America on ABC and its affiliates internationally.

== Career ==
Jessica Ridley was born in Calgary, Alberta and grew up in the bedroom community of Airdrie, Alberta. She plays the piano, guitar and mandolin.

Although Jessica had performed in school plays as a youngster, she didn't believe that a future in professional music was an option until a music producer happened to catch her singing in church one week. A series of follow up meetings led to the decision to create a 5-song demo to see where things would head. From that first trip to Nashville, Jessica was hooked on trying to make this work. Working with the duo of Don Somerville and Billy Simon, the first set of songs came together over three trips to the Music City. That included the first single to Canadian airwaves "Hit and Run" which was released to Canadian radio in the spring of 2009. That first song made its way onto the Country Music News Top 100 CanCountry chart where it topped out at 91.

The full album was scheduled to be released on EMG Universal in the fall of 2010 but issues with Fused Management delayed it again. Because of the delay, though, another song was able to be recorded and added to the album. "Flaming Red" was written by Bob Carlisle and Dennis Patton and was destined for a female country voice and it found a home with Jessica. In the spring of 2011 it became the first song released to American radio where it reached the 62nd spot on the Billboard Top 100 Country Chart and in Canada it was a top 50 song on the Canadian Country Chart.

When the album did make its appearance in stores and digitally it received great reviews from around North America including Nashville's Music Row Magazine, Canada's Country Music News, Showbiz Junkies and the Airdrie Echo

She has also released a holiday season tune named "The Spirit of Christmas" which was a duet with CMT's "Can You Duet" finalist Chris Cline. That reached the mid-80s on the holiday charts in both Canada and the United States.

In total five singles were released; Hit and Run to Canadian and European radio, Flaming Red to Canadian, American, European and Australia radio; The Spirit of Christmas to Canadian and American radio, Bluer Than Bluegrass to Europe and Australia and most recently The Highway to Canadian and American radio. With Bluer Than Bluegrass reaching No. 4 in the UK during November 2011.

Jessica Ridley has also written a pair of songs that were recorded in Korea and another being cut in Canada.

In late 2011, Jessica auditioned for a new social-reality show created by Bud United to air on ABC in 2012. "The Big Time" was a competition show that featured a different genre each week. She was a cast member for the music episode going head to head with Nashville's Justin Nault and England's Laura Jeanne. The four round competition set in Las Vegas, Nevada featuring the contestants battling through singing their national anthems, then writing a radio jingle, followed by a live performance before the grand prize of being the opening act for the 2011 iHeartRadio Music Festival at the MGM Grand in front of 17,000 fans. The show featured guest judges Narada Michael Walden, the famed Whitney Houston producer and Julie Pilat from Los Angeles' KIIS FM. The show aired 21 January 2012.

As of 11 May 2012 Bluer Than Bluegrass was at No. 17 on the Belgium Chart and No. 32 on the ECMA Pan-European Chart.

The summer that year brought another series of performances including being part of CMA Fest held annually in Nashville, Tennessee. In the fall, Ridley was part of the UK Country Throwdown. JessJunkies was launched as a fan club for Jessica's fans around the world. Also the first cut from the upcoming and untitled album, "The Highway", was released digitally worldwide, "The Highway" music video was directed by Eugene Brown.

In the spring of 2013 she opened up for fellow Canadian George Canyon.

2015 brought a trip to the United Kingdom as tour support for Ward Thomas for 18 dates. She released a single recorded specifically for this tour, called “One of Those Days” co-written with Chris Eaton and wife Abby Eaton.

Jessica is currently working on her follow up album with producer Dennis Patton and several singles from this project have already been released. These include “Better”, “Inner Outlaw” and “Breathing Water”.

== Personal life ==
Most of Jessica's childhood was spent growing up in Airdrie, Alberta. As a youngster she played hockey and baseball in the community and played on the high school varsity volleyball team earning Most Improved honors. During her growing up years she worked at McDonald's and saved up to buy her first car – an orange 1974 VW Beetle. She graduated from Airdrie Koinonia Christian School in 2002.

A year after high school, she married Kent Ridley and together they have four kids born between 2004-2009. They subsequently divorced and in 2019, Jessica remarried programmer/producer/keyboard player/songwriter Dennis Patton. Together they reside outside of Nashville, TN.

== Discography ==
=== Albums ===
- 2012 – Fit To Be Tied

=== Singles ===
| Year | Single | Album | Highest Chart Position |
|---|---|---|---|
| 2010 | "Hit and Run" (Canadian Release) | Fit To Be Tied | 91 (Canada Country Chart) |
| 2010 | "Spirit of Christmas" (Canadian/American Release) | (single) | 63 (Canadian Holiday Chart) |
| 2011 | "Flaming Red" (American Release) | Fit To Be Tied | 62 (Billboard – Country) |
| 2011 | "Bluer Than Bluegrass" (European Release) | Fit To Be Tied | 32 (ECMA Chart); 3 (Italy Chart); 4 (UK Chart); 15 (Belgium Chart) |
| 2011 | "Fit To Be Tied" (Canadian/European Release) | Fit To Be Tied | 15 (Belgium Chart) |

=== Music videos ===
| Year | Title | Director |
|---|---|---|
| 2011 | "Hit and Run" | Blake Faucette |
| 2011 | "Undone" | Blake Faucette |
| 2012 | "Flaming Red" | Blake Faucette |
| 2012 | "The Highway" | Eugene Brown |

== Awards ==
Won ABC's "The Big Time"
