= Martin Ridley =

English Victorian/Edwardian photographer (1861-1936)

Martin John Ridley
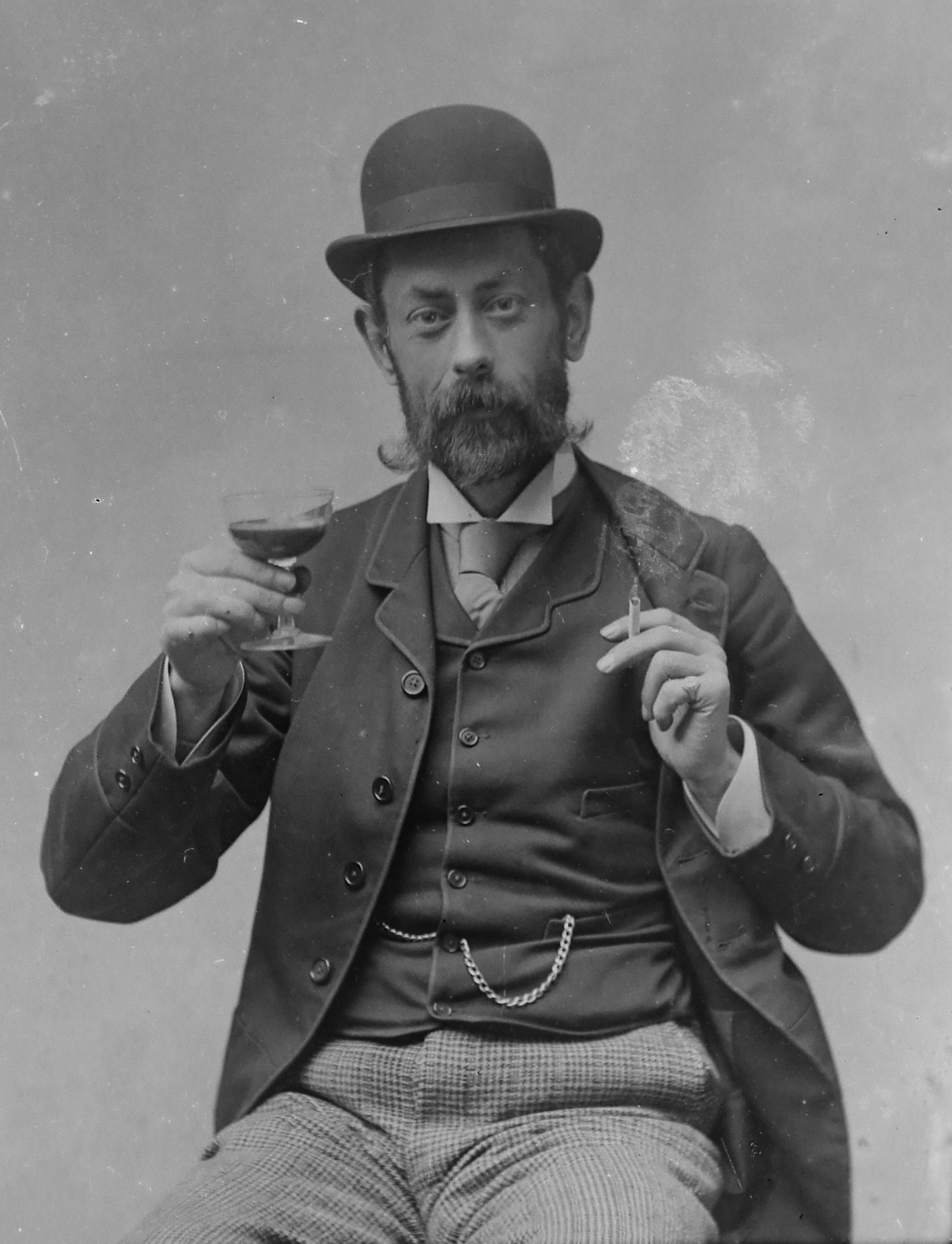
- Self-portrait of Martin Ridley
- Born: 11 January 1861; Reading, Berkshire, England
- Died: 13 June 1936 (aged 75); Bournemouth, Dorset, England
- Education: Staplegrove, Taunton, Somerset
- Occupation: Photographer
- Spouse: Alice Ridley
- Children: Walford Ridley; Winifred Ridley; Cecil Ridley
- Father: William Ridley

Martin John Ridley (Martin J Ridley or MJR) (11 January 1861 – 13 June 1936) was an English Victorian/Edwardian photographer based in Bournemouth. His photographs were used to produce picture postcards of the seaside towns and attractions in the South of England. Many of these postcards are still circulating at postcard fairs and acquired by collectors. They are usually identifiable by the initials "MJR" followed by a serial number. Several thousand of his original glass-plate negatives are being academically catalogued. A large sub-section of these negatives, featuring scenes in Wales, is held by the National Library of Wales in Aberystwyth.

Although based in Bournemouth, Ridley's photographs span from Oxford in the north and Cornwall in the southwest to the Isle of Wight in the south.

== Early life ==
Martin John Ridley was born in January 1861 in Reading, the son of William Ridley, a timber merchant from White Notley in Essex, and Mira from Bury St Edmunds in Suffolk. He had four brothers: Ernest, Bernard, Thomas and Edward.

The 1871 census shows the 10-year-old Martin Ridley at boarding school in Staplegrove, near Taunton in Somerset. The 1881 census records the family living in East Gate House, Sonning, near Reading. Martin, then aged 20, was a Merchant's Clerk. Evidently, the family was quite well off as they employed a governess and two domestic servants. In 1888, Martin married Alice from Wrentham, Suffolk. By 1891, they lived at 3 Victoria Buildings, Old Christchurch Road, Holdenhurst, Bournemouth, with their children Walford and Winifred (born 1890 in Margate, Kent) and their housemaid. By this stage, Ridley's occupation is listed as a Photographer.

By 1903, the Ridleys were living at 37 Haviland Road, Boscombe, Bournemouth, and had a new son, Cecil Leighton, who was born in Boscombe in 1897, Walford having died in 1894, aged just five years.

== Starting the photographic business ==
Between 1891 and 1894, Ridley teamed up with Harry Alfred Miell from 45 Catherine Street, Salisbury. It may well have been Miell's influence that started the whole photographic partnership, as Harry Miell's father, James, was a photographic dealer when Harry was still a young boy. By the time of the 1881 census, Harry, too, was registered as a photographer. By 1901, Miell had moved to Bournemouth with his wife, two children, and brother-in-law and was listed as an employer in a photographic business. The 1911 census lists him as a photographic publisher. Winifred, Ridley's daughter, then 21, is also mentioned and has "Photo Printing & Colorist" as her occupation.

Harry Miell and Martin Ridley formed Miell & Ridley, Bournemouth & Bristol, with premises firstly at the Ridley home and then at 90 Old Christchurch Road, Bournemouth. It seems that Miell did mostly portraiture in the studio while Ridley concentrated on landscapes, townscapes, and seaside shots – often to produce Cartes de Visite. According to an article in the London Gazette, the partnership was dissolved on 2 April 1901.

Picture postcards from Ridley's photographs are still highly collectible items and are frequently found on eBay and at postcard fairs. The cards are mostly coloured and would have been hand-tinted as part of the production process, which mostly happened in Germany, presumably ending with the outbreak of the First World War in 1914.

== Post-World War 1 ==
Not much is known of Ridley after this period except that his health was failing, and much of the work of the photographic business fell to his daughter Winifred, who also struggled to keep it going, having to cope with nursing sick relatives and homing wartime refugees. Portrait photographs from 1928 exist and bear the name “Miell & Miell”, so it may be that Harry Miell set up in business with his son. Ridley himself died in Bournemouth in June 1936, aged 75. Son Cecil married in 1921 and lived to the age of 89, dying in Manchester in 1985 without children.

== The photographic collection ==
After 70 years of being the Ridley family home, 37 Haviland Road, Bournemouth, was to be redeveloped. So in May 1964, Martin Ridley's daughter, Miss Winifred Ridley, began disposing of her Father's photographic materials. The Bournemouth Library took many of the printed cards and some of the local glass-plate negatives. The remainder of the glass plates – probably more than 6,000 – were to be destroyed by burial in a hole in the garden. Hearing of the impending destruction of these plates, Mrs Pamela Mole, a Bournemouth businesswoman, bought the collection from Miss Winifred and rescued the condemned glass plates from the tarpaulin where they were about to be tipped into the hole. She put them into storage until she could consider what to do with them. Retirement in 2007 finally allowed her to reclaim the plates from storage and decide what to do with them. Over the years, some plates had gone missing some decayed, but the current collection of about 5000–6000 is safe, and the vast majority render superb images.

Now living in Cambridge, Mrs. Mole teamed up with local architect and photographer Bruce Stuart and university lecturer John Martin to begin capturing the glass images onto modern digital storage media while also attempting to identify and catalogue the images.

As of 2015, many of the glass negatives are owned by the NetXPosure Image Library and many can be viewed online. The glass negatives have been scanned at a very high resolution and are undergoing digital restoration.

== Significance of the collection ==
Photography was born some 35 years before Martin Ridley, so he cannot be described as a pioneer of the art form. However, Ridley was active as a photographer when the medium was still very much in its Golden Age. His photographs are a fine record of the late Victorian and Edwardian eras, showing the time's dress, transport, industry, architecture, social life, and obsessions. Those interested in trams, early motorcars, Welsh collieries, steamships, and bridges will not be disappointed. A few photographs clearly show post-Great War developments, and it can be assumed that Ridley continued to photograph into the 1920s or maybe even slightly later. The collection is smaller than the better-known Frith Collection, but Frith covered much of England, whereas Ridley never seemed to go further north than Oxford.

A few true gems of history are also to be found in the collection. For example, a photograph of Stonehenge taken in c1901 shows that the world-famous stone circle was very different 100 years ago. Many buildings Ridley photographed were subsequently destroyed in World War II. The small sub-section of Bristol scenes demonstrates this nicely. The Roman Baths in Bath were being renovated in Ridley's time, and he has captured images during that period that will not be seen again.

Very curiously, there are a few photographs taken in Australia. It is unknown if Ridley visited Australia himself or if these few photographs are copies he made from the work of others.

== The Welsh photographs ==
Over 800 of the photographs are of locations in Wales. They range from landscapes and townscapes to castles, docks, and collieries. The Welsh section of the collection is the first to be catalogued and stored on digital media. The vast majority of the Welsh photographs are annotated. Ridley meticulously recorded the subject and location in ink on the glass plates themselves – something which, unfortunately, he did not do with many of the English photographs, presumably through familiarity.

In circa 1905, Ridley was responsible for the publication of a booklet entitled 'Sixty-One Views of The Rhondda Valley' It is not yet clear if these photographs are part of, or in addition to, the collection currently discussed here. Cardiff, Abertillery, Penarth, Newport, and Cowbridge also feature heavily in the Welsh section.

In February 2009, the Welsh section of plates was sold to the National Library of Wales in Aberystwyth.
