= All-female band =

Musical group exclusively composed of female musicians

An all-female band is a musical group in popular music that is exclusively composed of female musicians. This is distinct from a girl group, in which the female members are solely vocalists, though this terminology is not universally followed. While all-male bands are common in many rock and pop scenes, all-female bands are less common.

== 1920s–1950s ==
In the Jazz Age and during the 1930s, "all-girl" bands such as the Blue Belles, the Parisian Redheads (later the Bricktops), Lil-Hardin's All-Girl Band, the Ingenues, the Harlem Playgirls led by the likes of Neliska Ann Briscoe and Eddie Crump, the International Sweethearts of Rhythm, Phil Spitalny's Musical Sweethearts, Helen Lewis and Her All-Girl Jazz Syncopators as well as Helen Lewis and Her Rhythm Queens were popular. Dozens of early sound films were made of the vaudeville style all-girl groups, especially short subject promotional films for Paramount and Vitaphone. (In 1925, Lee de Forest filmed Lewis and her band in his short-lived Phonofilm process, in a film now in the Maurice Zouary collection at the Library of Congress.) Blanche Calloway, sister of Cab Calloway, led a male band, Blanche Calloway and Her Joy Boys, from 1932 to 1939, and Ina Ray Hutton led an all-girl band, the Melodears, from 1934 to 1939. Eunice Westmoreland, under the name Rita Rio, led an all-girl band appearing on NBC Radio and in short subjects for Vitaphone and RKO before changing her career to acting and her professional name to Dona Drake, appearing in numerous 1940s movies. Ivy Benson's "All Girls Band" was the BBC's resident dance band in 1943 and toured until the 1980s. All-girl bands active in vaudeville, variety shows, and early sound films during the 1920s to the 1950s are documented in Kristin McGee's book Some Liked it Hot: Jazz Women in Film and Television. Sally Placksin, Linda Dahl, D. Antoinette Handy, and Frank Driggs along with professor Sherrie Tucker, in her book Swing Shift: "All-Girl" Bands of the 1940s, have also documented this era.

== 1960s ==
Bands composed solely of women began to emerge with the advent of rock and roll. Among the earliest all-female rock bands to be signed to a record label were Goldie and the Gingerbreads, to Atlantic Records in 1964, the Pleasure Seekers with Suzi Quatro to Hideout Records in 1964 and Mercury Records in 1968, the Feminine Complex to Athena Records in 1968, and Fanny (who pioneered the all-female band sound in the early to mid-1970s) in 1969 when Mo Ostin signed them to Warner Bros. Records. There were also others, such as the Liverbirds (1962–1967), the Ace of Cups (1967), the Heart Beats (1968), and Ariel (1968–1970) which included the three members of the Deadly Nightshade.

From 1964 to 1968 the Pandoras was an all-girl band (one of the first) playing a few original tunes and a bunch of popular covers at concerts and dances throughout New England. They started out as a trio, with Simmons College students Kathy Kinsella and Pinky Keehner on rhythm guitar and lead guitar, and Sally Levy on drums. Much later, under the management guidance of Peter Bonfils, the band had some success, including a recording contract and a couple of singles with Liberty Records ("About My Baby", b/w "New Day," and "Games" b/w "Don't Bother"), and gigs that showed all around the U.S. as well as in Newfoundland and Puerto Rico, opening for acts including the Kingsmen, Dionne Warwick, the Byrds, and Gary Lewis & the Playboys.

The Shaggs were an all-female family band who earned some regional notoriety during their time as a performing band in the late 1960s; by the time they had disbanded in 1975 their first album Philosophy of the World had caught the attention of Frank Zappa and by 1980, NRBQ arranged for it to have a wide release. The Shaggs, particularly in their early years, were noted for their inability to adhere to basic norms of popular music (their drummer, Helen Wiggin, often found herself detached from the music her sisters Dot and Betty were singing and playing on guitar), which somewhat ironically (and to their bewilderment) made them icons of outsider music.

== 1970s ==
Roger Ebert, in his audio commentary for Beyond the Valley of the Dolls (1970) gives the film credit for inspiring all-female rock bands, with the fictional band Carrie Nations created for the film, stating that such bands were quite rare at the time, but started to spring up in the film's wake.

Fanny were the first all-female rock band to release an album on a major label. On November 6, 1971, Fanny became the first all-female band to reach the Hot 100's top 40, with "Charity Ball" peaking at No. 40.

In 1975, the Canadian duo of sisters, Kate & Anna McGarrigle, recorded the first of a string of albums, sometimes joined by their sister Jane. The Runaways were an early commercially successful, hard-edged, all-female hard rock band, releasing their first album in 1976; band members Joan Jett, Cherie Currie, and Lita Ford all went on to solo careers.

In the United Kingdom, the advent of punk in the late 1970s with its "anyone can do it" ethos lead to the formation of such bands as the Slits, the Raincoats, Mo-dettes, Dolly Mixture, and the Innocents among others, and the formation of other groups where the female members influenced the music and lyrical content (Au Pairs, Delta 5) or were the featured artist within the ensemble, notably The Pretenders, Siouxsie and the Banshees and X-Ray Spex. The expansion of punk into Europe gave rise to Switzerland's die Kleenex/LiLiPUT.

In Australia in 1977 all-girl band Sweet Jayne began doing regular gigs with the original lineup: Cris Bonacci, Chris Scheri, Robyn Clark and Sally Zylstra. Labelled "Sweet and Heavy Rock", Sweet Jayne played mostly original material. Winning the Australasian Yamaha Battle of the Bands in 1978, Sweet Jayne went on through various cassette, vinyl and film clip releases and line up changes and played 700 gigs over 6 years. Sweet Jayne split up in 1983 when Chris Scheri (flute and vocals) and Cris Bonacci (guitar) were invited to the UK to work for Mike Oldfield.

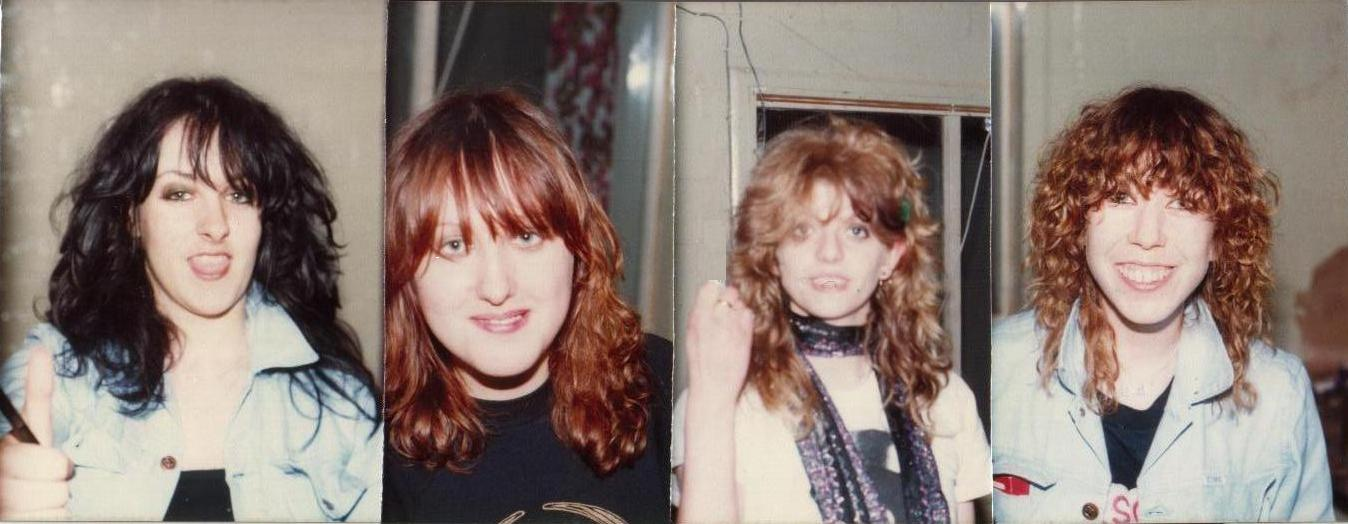
Girlschool in 1981.

The all-female heavy metal band Girlschool, from South London, formed in 1978. While somewhat successful in the UK, they became better known in the early 1980s. One of the original members of the band, Kathy Valentine, departed to join the all-female band the Go-Go's, switching from guitar to bass. Among Girlschool's early recordings was an EP titled St. Valentine's Day Massacre which they recorded with Bronze label-mates Motörhead under the name Headgirl.

In 1974, the Deadly Nightshade, a rock/country band (Anne Bowen, rhythm guitar/percussion; Pamela Robin Brandt, electric bass; Helen Hooke, lead guitar/violin) was signed by RCA's custom label Phantom. The contract made RCA/Phantom the first mainstream record label to grant a band the right to reject any advertising offensive to feminist sensibilities. The band released two albums, The Deadly Nightshade in 1975 and F&W (Funky & Western) in 1976. Reunited in 2009, the Deadly Nightshade recorded and released a third album Never Never Gonna Stop in 2012 and they continually toured until Brandt's death in 2015, dissolving the band.

== 1980s and 1990s ==
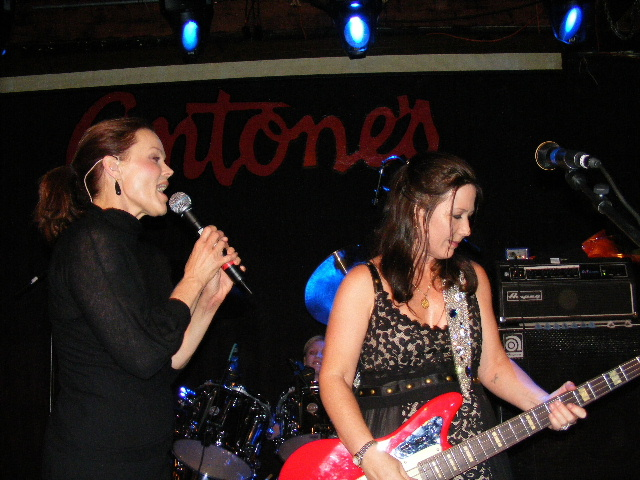
Belinda Carlisle and Kathy Valentine of The Go-Gos.

The 1980s, for the first time, saw long-sought chart success from all-female bands and female-fronted rock bands. On the Billboard Hot 100 year-end chart for 1982 Joan Jett's "I Love Rock 'n' Roll" at No. 3 and the Go-Go's' "We Got the Beat" at No. 2 sent a strong message out to many industry heads that women who could play could bring in money. While Joan Jett played "no-frills, glam-rock anthems, sung with her tough-as-nails snarl and sneer", the Go-Go's were seen as playful girls, an image that even Rolling Stone magazine poked fun at when they put the band on their cover in their underwear along with the caption "Go-Go's Put out!". However musician magazines were starting to show respect to female musicians, putting Bonnie Raitt and Tina Weymouth on their covers. While the Go-Go's and the Bangles, both from the L.A. club scene, were the first all-female rock bands to find sustained success, individual musicians paved the way for the industry to seek out bands that had female musicians and allow them to be part of the recording process.

While the 1980s helped pave the way for female musicians to get taken more seriously it was still considered a novelty of sorts for several years, and it was very much a male-dominated world. In 1984, when film maker Dave Markey, along with Jeff and Steve McDonald from Redd Kross, put together the mockumentary Desperate Teenage Lovedolls, a comically punky version of Beyond the Valley of the Dolls, it also spawned a real band. While the Lovedolls could barely play at first, because of the film, and because they were an "all-female band", they received press and gigs.

Klymaxx became the first self-produced all-female band in the R&B/pop style of music to play all instruments; several of their singles - including "Meeting in the Ladies Room" and "I Miss You" charted in both R&B and pop countdowns.

Leading into the 1990s, the surge of heavy metal in the 1980s helped to shed another light on the role of women in music. Because of the success of the Go-Go's and the Bangles many women were frustrated at not being taken seriously or only thought of as "cute chicks playing music" and either joined rock bands or formed all-female metal bands. One such band that was playing harder music in San Francisco was Rude Girl. Originally signed to CBS Records, the band splintered before an album would be released and the remaining members released a 12-inch single in 1987 under the name Malibu Barbi. When Cara Crash and Wanda Day left 4 Non Blondes and joined Malibu Barbi their sound shifted from heavy metal to a sound described as combining a "driving beat with Johnny Rottenesque vocal and post-punk riffs". Around the same time in the Midwest, Madam X was signed to an offshoot of Columbia Records, Jet Records. In 1984, the Rick Derringer-produced album We Reserve the Right was released along with the single "High in High School". The Petrucci sisters were a focal point of the band – Maxine, the lead guitarist, and Roxy, the drummer. However, based on management decisions, it was decided that it would be better if only one of the sisters was in the band and Roxy was placed in another band, the all-female, Los Angeles–based Vixen.

Vixen was founded also in the Midwest, but in St. Paul, Minnesota, by Jan Kuehnemund during the mid-1970s. Kuehnemund folded the band a few months later, when her bandmates either dropped out or joined other bands, and she reformed it after moving to L.A. at the start of the 1980s. Vixen was sometimes described as "the female Bon Jovi", eventually becoming commercially successful due largely to the band's signature hit "Edge of a Broken Heart" from their self-titled debut album, making Vixen erroneously a one-hit wonder, although their next hit, a cover of Jeff Paris's "Cryin'", charted even higher in both Britain and the US. The band folded again in the early 1990s following musical differences, but reformed twice more in their history. Maxine Petrucci also joined Vixen, albeit as a touring bass guitarist, after her sister invited her in 1998 until the Petruccis and their fellow band members were forced to disperse when Kuehnemund, feeling left out and her lead in representing Vixen being usurped, successfully sued to keep the rights to her band's name. She reunited Vixen in 2001, with a new bassist in tow, until disagreements with the band's management caused Kuehnemund's bandmates to leave, driving her to search for and hire new members. In 2004, Vixen's line-up from the Vixen and Rev It Up era made a one-time appearance on VH1's Bands Reunited, as its Canadian host has been a fan of the band. The line-up from 2001 recorded a fourth album, Live & Learn, released between 2006 and 2007. Kuehnemund died in 2013 and Vixen was reformed with three-quarters of the "classic" line-up plus Gina Stile, the lead guitarist from the Tangerine period, to honor her legacy. Both Stile and long-time frontwoman/rhythm guitarist Janet Gardner have left the band by the end of the 2010s.

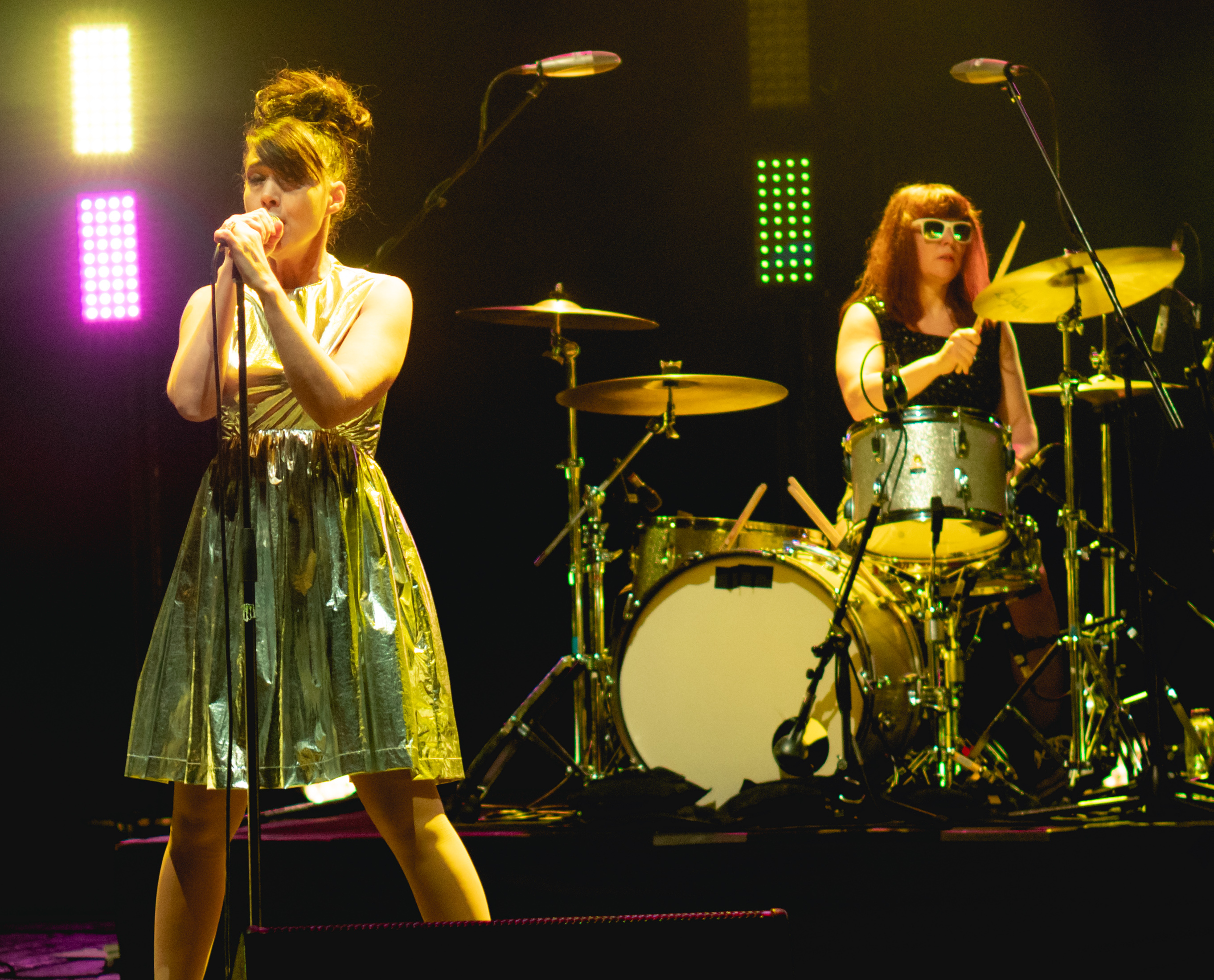
Bikini Kill.

With the resurgence of interest in pop-punk bands in the US in the early 1990s, along with the sunset strip "hair metal" scene becoming extremely crowded, bands who combined a "non-image" with loud raw music started were gigging at clubs like Rajis in Hollywood. Bands such as Hole, Super Heroines, the Lovedolls, and L7 became popular, while demonstrating on stage, and in interviews, a self-confident "bad girl" attitude at times, always willing to challenge assumptions about how an all-female band should behave. Courtney Love described the other women in Hole as using a more "lunar viewpoint" in their roles as musicians. In the 1990s, riot grrrl became the genre associated with bands such as Bratmobile and Bikini Kill. Other punk bands, such as Spitboy, have been less comfortable with the childhood-centered issues of much of the riot grrrl aesthetic, but nonetheless also have dealt explicitly with feminist and related issues. All-female Queercore bands, such as Fifth Column, Tribe 8, and Team Dresch, also write songs dealing with matters specific to women and their position in society. A film put together by a San Diego psychiatrist, Dr. Lisa Rose Apramian, along with the former drummer from the Motels and the Droogs, Kyle C. Kyle, the documentary Not Bad for a Girl explored some of these issues with interviews from many of the female musicians on the riot grrrl scene at the time.

In contemporary Christian music history, there was the first all-female Christian rock band Rachel Rachel, which existed only during the early 1990s and who performed in an album-oriented rock style. Jennifer York became the first woman to establish a Christian band, specifically an all-female group. Even though Rachel Rachel's success was short lived when they folded due to "creative differences" and too great a geographic distance, future rock bands or non-rock musical groups in the Christian genre that have only women as members followed their lead in the next decades to come.

Many female musicians from all-female bands in the 1980s and 1990s have gone on to more high-profile gigs. The Pandoras' former members include members of the Muffs; Leather Leone, the singer from Rude Girl and Malibu Barbi, went on to sing for Chastain; Warbride's founder and lead guitarist, Lori Linstruth joined Arjen Lucassen; Abby Travis from the Lovedolls has played with Beck, Elastica, and Bangles; Meredith Brooks, from the Graces, went on to solo success and Janet Robin, from Precious Metal, was the touring guitarist for Brooks as well as Lindsey Buckingham and Air Supply. Sweet Jayne's Cris Bonacci became Girlschool's lead guitarist in 1985 and stayed with the band for fewer than 10 years. Girlschool, despite numerous line-up changes, have never broken up despite a brief hiatus and celebrated their 40th anniversary in 2018.

== 2000s and 2010s ==
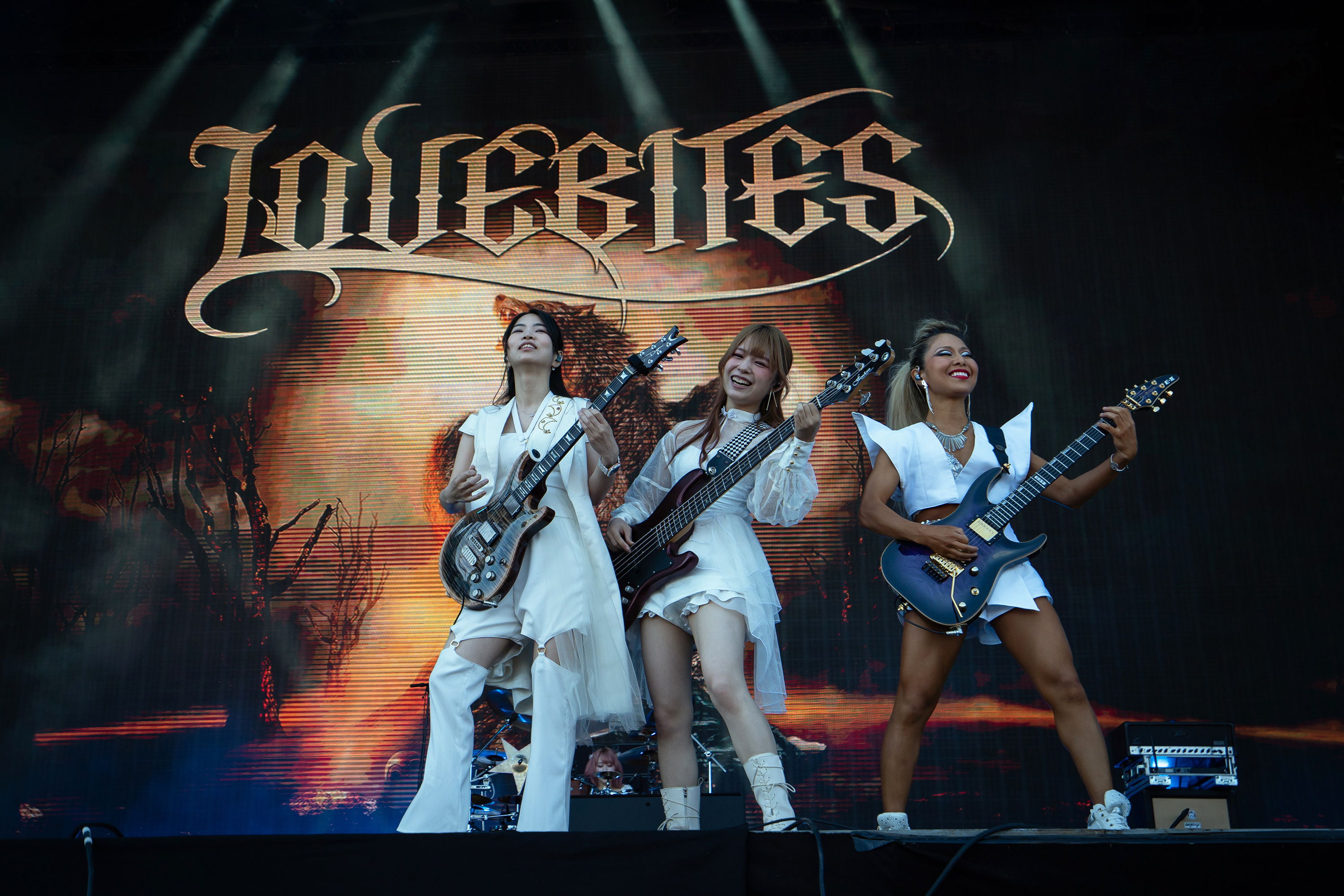
Lovebites.

In Japan, the 2010s brought a boom of all-female heavy metal bands forming and gaining mainstream attention. Although considered pioneers as the first to form in 2007, Destrose never achieved commercial success. Aldious have been cited as the initiators of the movement when their first album Deep Exceed (2010) topped the Oricon Indies Albums Chart and reached number 15 on the main chart. Another notable girls metal band is Cyntia, who are believed to have been the first of the movement to join a major record label when they signed to Victor Entertainment in 2013. Other bands include Mary's Blood, Fate Gear, and Lovebites, the last of which won the 2018 Metal Hammer Golden Gods Award for Best New Band. Another example of all-female band is the Brazilian death metal band Crypta, formed 2019 in São Paulo. They released their first album titled Echoes of The Soul through Napalm Records in 2021. Crypta performed at the Wacken Open Air 2022 festival.

In the 2010s, some groups that would typically fit the description of an all-female band began expressing their ambivalence towards the term, and similar terms such as "girl band" or "female-fronted band". Female musicians have written about the gendered double standard behind such descriptors, pointing out how seldom the term "all-male band" is used, and that a society with gender equality would not describe types of musical groups based on the gender of their members. Prominent bands who have adopted this viewpoint include American pop rock trio Haim, and Australian alternative rock trio Camp Cope.

== Outside pop music ==
All-female bands are not restricted to the mainstream genres. The British/Australian string quartet Bond play classical crossover (first and second violin, viola, and cello) and sing the occasional vocals that accompany some of their tracks. Many bands across many genres are all-female, such as the psychedelic folk group Spires That in the Sunset Rise.

== See also ==
- List of all-female bands
- Mixed-gender band
- Riot grrrl
- Queercore
- Women in music
- Women's music

== Bibliography ==
- Stieven-Taylor, Alison (2007). Rock Chicks: The Hottest Female Rockers from the 1960s to Now. Sydney: Rockpool Publishing. ISBN 978-1-921295-06-5.
- Bayton, Mavis (1998). Frock Rock: Women Performing Popular Music. Oxford and New York: Oxford University Press. ISBN 0-19-816615-X.
- Carson, Mina Julia, ed. (2004). Girls rock!: Fifty Years of Women Making Music. Lexington, Kentucky: University Press of Kentucky. ISBN 0-8131-2310-0.
- Gaar, Gillian G. (1992). She's a Rebel: The History of Women in Rock & Roll. Seattle, Washington: Seal Press. ISBN 1-878067-08-7.
- O'Dair, Barbara, ed. (1997). Trouble Girls: The Rolling Stone Book of Women in Rock. New York: Random House. ISBN 0-679-76874-2.
- Raphael, Amy (1995). Never Mind the Bollocks: Women Rewrite Rock. London: Virago. ISBN 1-85381-887-9.
- Savage, Ann M. (2003). They're Playing Our Songs: Women Talk About Feminist Rock Music. Westport, Conn.: Praeger. ISBN 0-275-97356-5.
