= Jenna Sanz-Agero =

American singer-songwriter

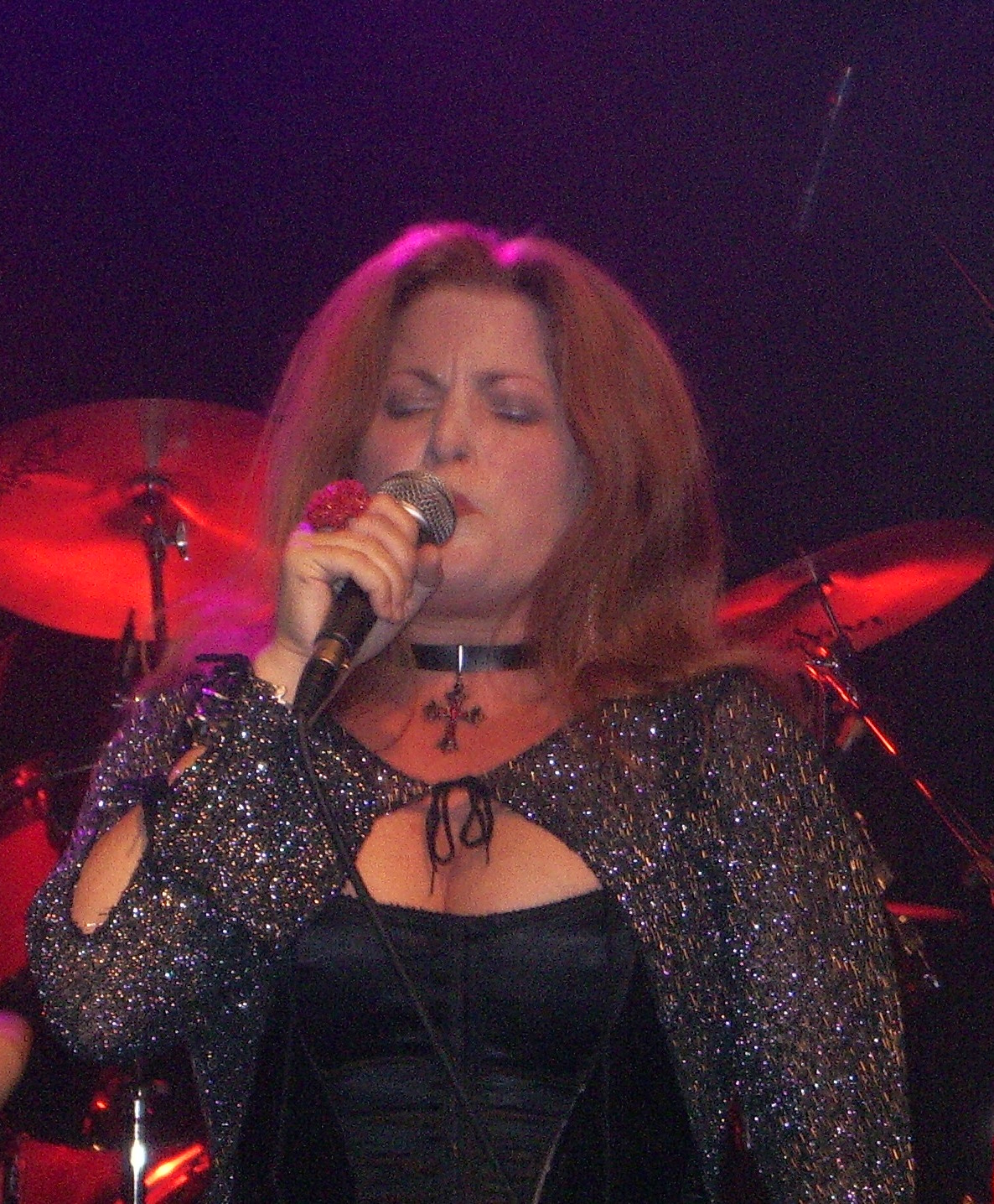
- Jenna Sanz-Agero performing live in June 2005
- Born: Jenna Leah Piccolo; November 10, 1969 (age 56)
- Education: Sacred Heart University (BS); Pepperdine University (JD)
- Occupations: Entertainment executive, lawyer, writer, former songwriter, former singer
- Years active: 1995–present
- Musical career
- Genres: Hard rock
- Instruments: Vocals, Guitars
- Years active: 1990–2013, 2016
- Formerly of: Vixen, NoNo BadDog, Belladonna

Jenna Leah Sanz-Agero (née Piccolo; born November 10, 1969) is the former lead singer of the female rock band Vixen from 2001-2013, and a former president of Media 8.

== Education ==
Sanz-Agero received her B.S. degree in Finance, summa cum laude, from Sacred Heart University and her J.D., magna cum laude, from Pepperdine University, and was admitted to the California Bar in 1995.

== Law and business career ==
Before joining Media 8 in 2003, Sanz-Agero was a founding partner in the law firm Business Affairs, Inc., which provided business and legal affairs services related to the development, production, finance, and distribution of television and film projects. She previously served as Vice President of Business and Legal Affairs for MDP Worldwide, Media 8's old name.

She resigned as Media 8 co-President on September 8, 2006. She later served as head of business affairs and strategy consultant for Foresight Unlimited.

From 2007 to 2017 Sanz-Agero served as President of Lapin Blanc, Inc. Following her departure from Lapin Blanc, Inc., she served as Chief Operating Officer, Executive Vice President of Business Affairs and Operations for The H Collective, a motion picture company, until 2019. In July of the same year, she assumed the role of Director of Business, Legal Affairs and Strategic Knowledge Management at Netflix.

Sanz-Agero co-authored the dessert cookbook Sugar, Sugar: Every Recipe Has a Story (Andrews McMeel Publishing, October 2011) with Kimberly "Momma" Reiner.

== Music career ==
Sanz-Agero was the lead singer of local Los Angeles bands including NoNo BadDog and Belladonna. She was recruited by Jan Kuehnemund to join Vixen during the Voices of Metal Tour in 2001 with other 1980s bands such as Slaughter, Stephen Pearcy's Ratt, and Mötley Crüe lead singer Vince Neil. Sanz-Agero provided the lead vocals for the 2006 Vixen releases Extended Versions (a.k.a. Live in Sweden), released by Sony BMG in July, and studio album Live & Learn, released in November in Europe and January 2007 in the U.S. She co-wrote most of the songs for the latter album.

In a July 2011 interview, Sanz-Agero confirmed that a second album featuring the 2001 line-up was in the works and revealed the existence of a track called "I Understand" along with other new recordings and outtakes during the Live & Learn sessions. There has yet to be a proper release for these recordings due to Vixen not having a single member from that line-up anymore.

Sanz-Agero amicably left Vixen and her music career in 2013, as Jan Kuehnemund was planning to reunite the classic lineup with Janet Gardner, Share Ross, and Roxy Petrucci; however, Kuehnemund died on October 10, 2013, and was replaced by a returning Gina Stile. On January 21, 2016, Sanz-Agero appeared only for one night alongside Vixen's revamped lineup to perform with them in Anaheim, where, together, they sang "Love Is a Killer" from the band's 1990 album Rev It Up. Future Vixen frontwoman Lorraine Lewis's Femme Fatale served as the co-opening act.

== Discography ==
Vixen

- Extended Versions - Live in Sweden (2006)
- Live & Learn (2006)
