= Live & Learn (Vixen album) =

Studio album by Vixen
- Released: November 6, 2006
- Recorded: 2005 – May 2006
- Studio: Bull Dog Den Studio, Eagle Rock, California
- Genre: Hard rock
- Length: 43:47
- Label: Demolition
- Producer: Dennis MacKay

Vixen chronology
Tangerine (1998)	Live & Learn (2006)

Professional ratings
Review scores
Source	Rating
AllMusic	2/5 stars

Live & Learn is the fourth studio album by American hard rock band Vixen, released on November 6, 2006, in Europe and on January 30, 2007, in the United States. The band's line-up performing on this album was formed in 2001 with the only original member guitarist Jan Kuehnemund.

This is the last studio album featuring Kuehnemund, who died in 2013, and the only studio album for this line-up as returning members Janet Gardner, Roxy Petrucci, Share Ross, and Gina Stile took on the Vixen name after the remaining members negotiated the best step to take after Kuehnemund's death, which was to allow the surviving classic members to reunite.

== Track listing ==
All tracks are written by Jan Kuehnemund and Jenna Sanz-Agero, except where noted.

No.	Title	Writer(s)	Length
1.	"Anyway"		3:34
2.	"Live and Learn"		3:12
3.	"I Try"		3:53
4.	"Little Voice"		3:47
5.	"Pacifist"	Eden Stollman, Kuehnemund, Liz Larin	3:50
6.	"Don't Want It Anymore"		3:55
7.	"Love Song"		3:27
8.	"Angry"	Kuehnemund, Sanz-Agero, Lynn Louise Lowrey	3:14
9.	"I'm Sorry"		3:04
10.	"You Wish"	Kuehnemund, Lowrey	3:44
11.	"Suffragette City"	David Bowie	3:25
12.	"Give Me Away"		4:36

== Personnel ==
Vixen

- Jan Kuehnemund – lead and rhythm guitars, backing vocals
- Jenna Sanz-Agero – lead and backing vocals
- Lynn Louise Lowrey – bass, backing vocals
- Kathrin Kraft – drums, additional backing vocals on "Suffragette City"

Additional musicians

- Chris Fayz – keyboards on "Little Voice" and "Give Me Away"
- Randy Wooten – keyboards on "Suffragette City"
- Paulie Cerra – saxophone on "Suffragette City"
- Robert Lear – bagpipe on "Give Me Away"

Production

- Dennis MacKay – producer, engineer, mixing
- Brian Gardner – mastering
