= Tangerine (Vixen album) =

Studio album by Vixen
- Released: May 1998
- Recorded: 1998
- Studios: Greg Rike Productions (Altamonte Springs, Florida); Carriage House (Stamford, Connecticut); Avatar (New York, New York)
- Genres: Post-grunge; hard rock
- Length: 49:50
- Labels: CMC International (US); Eagle (Europe)
- Producer: Vixen

Vixen chronology
Rev It Up (1990)	Tangerine (1998)	Live & Learn (2006)

Singles from Tangerine
- 1. "Shut Up" Released: 1998; 2. "Never Say Never" Released: 1998

Professional ratings
Review scores
Source	Rating
AllMusic	2.5/5 stars

Tangerine is the third album by the American rock band Vixen. It was recorded without contributions from Jan Kuehnemund and Share Pederson. The line-up for this album consisted of Janet Gardner, Gina Stile, and Roxy Petrucci. Tangerine has a different sound from the music of the previous albums of the band, more similar to post-grunge than glam metal. This is the only album to have Stile as Vixen guitarist and the final studio release to feature Gardner as vocalist-guitarist during their tenures in the band; they were forced to part ways following the Tangerine tour for legal reasons as the courts found Kuehnemund to be the sole owner of the band name thereby making this release unrecognized and unofficial.

Stile and Gardner later rejoined Vixen in 2013, along with Ross and Petrucci, after playing as the former JanetShareRoxyGina (JSRG) line-up. Stile and Gardner left the band for good in 2017 and 2019, respectively.

== Track listing ==
All tracks are written by Janet Gardner and Gina Stile, except where indicated.

No.	Title	Writer(s)	Length
1.	"Page"		4:36
2.	"Tangerine"		4:32
3.	"Never Say Never"		3:39
4.	"Peace"		4:59
5.	"Barely Breathin'"		4:13
6.	"Bleed"		4:00
7.	"Stay"		5:35
8.	"Shut Up"		4:05
9.	"Machine"		3:43
10.	"Air Balloon"		3:53
11.	"Can't Control Myself"		4:35
12.	"Swatting Flies in Wanker County (Instrumental; hidden track)"	Stile	2:00

== Personnel ==
Vixen

- Janet Gardner - lead vocals, rhythm guitar
- Gina Stile - lead and rhythm guitar, backing vocals
- Roxy Petrucci - drums, backing vocals

Additional musicians

- Mike Pisculli - bass

Production

- Andy Katz, Phil Magnotti - engineers, mixing
- Darrin Schneider - engineer
- Ed Stasium - mixing
- Greg Calbi - mastering at Masterdisk, New York
