= Gina Stile =

American songwriter

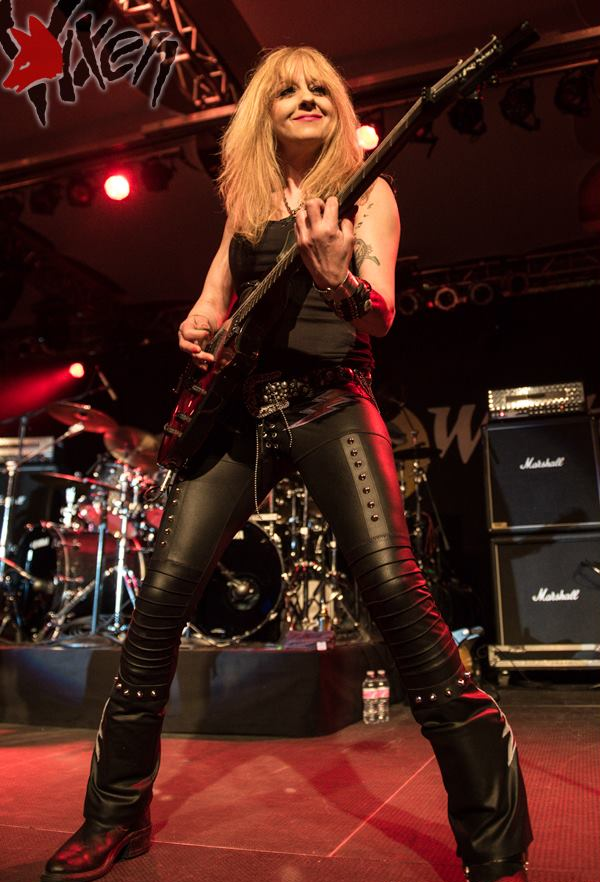

Background information
- Born: Gina Tagliente; January 19, 1965 (age 61); Massapequa, New York
- Genres: Hard rock, heavy metal, post-grunge
- Occupations: Musician, songwriter
- Instruments: Guitar, vocals
- Years active: 1979–2017
- Formerly of: Vixen, Envy, Poison Dollys, Revelation, Thunderbox

Gina Tagliente (born January 19, 1965), better known as Gina Stile, is an American former guitarist. She was lead guitar player of the reformed female hard rock band, Vixen, from 1997 to 1998 and 2013 until her departure from the band in March 2017.

== Early years ==
At the age of 9, an uncle bought her a four-stringed guitar, then at the age of 11 she started with a Japanese six-stringed guitar. Gina Stile got into a band with her sister when she was 13, Revelation. At that time, a studio made a recording and played it for Dee Snider. Snider played it for Twisted Sister's management, and they signed the band. At 14 her first big gig was opening up for Leslie West and Mountain.

== Music career ==
=== Poison Dollys and Envy ===
After some family issues, she joined the Poison Dollys, which was her first experience with an all-female band. At 19, they opened up for Aerosmith, a nine-show string of dates with them in front of 15,000 people. At 21, Stile left the Poison Dollys and got back together with her sister in Envy, and they were signed to Atlantic Records' sub-label, Atco. Snider produced the record, titled Ain't It a Sin. It was Envy's lone album and is the only one in Stile's career that was released by a major label.

=== Vixen part I ===
After Vixen disbanded in the early 1990s, Roxy Petrucci contacted Stile about working on a new project. Although nothing became of it, Roxy Petrucci eventually introduced Stile to Janet Gardner, and the two of them started writing together. The music that they were working on was never intended to be Vixen. Gardner and Stile began working with their own band in New York with Mike Pisculli on bass along with another male drummer. Around that time Petrucci called, asking about doing a Vixen tour.

Stile wasn't really keen on it, mostly because the songs they were writing were much heavier than Vixen. They contacted Jan Kuehnemund about doing the tour, but she turned it down. By that time, Gardner and Stile had already been working together for a few years and were starting to get offers to do a record. Since Petrucci and Gardner owned the name (along with Kuehnemund), they decided to do it as Vixen. They did the Tangerine record, went on tour for a few months and then it ended. After that tour, they split when Kuehnemund, feeling that Stile and the others left her out and usurped her lead in representing the band, sued them for trademark infringement involving the use of the Vixen name. Tangerine became Stile's sole studio release with Vixen.

=== Thunderbox ===
In between the Vixen years Stile had another all-female project, Thunderbox. They had recorded four songs and made a video for the song "Cherries N' Cream". Video on YouTube

=== Vixen part II ===
In 2012, Stile was busy with Thunderbox when she was again approached by Janet Gardner, Roxy Petrucci, and Share Ross about forming a new project, JSRG (Janet Share Roxy Gina). Stile performed with Petrucci and Gardner for the first time in 14 years. A planned reunion of the classic Vixen line-up with Gardner, Ross, and Petrucci, became impossible because on October 10, 2013, after nine months battling cancer, Jan Kuehnemund died at the age of 59. In December 2013, Gardner, Ross, Petrucci, and Stile decided to carry on under the Vixen name in honor of the late guitarist Kuehnemund. On March 25, 2017, Stile and Vixen parted ways. She was replaced by Britt Lightning and quietly retired a few years later.

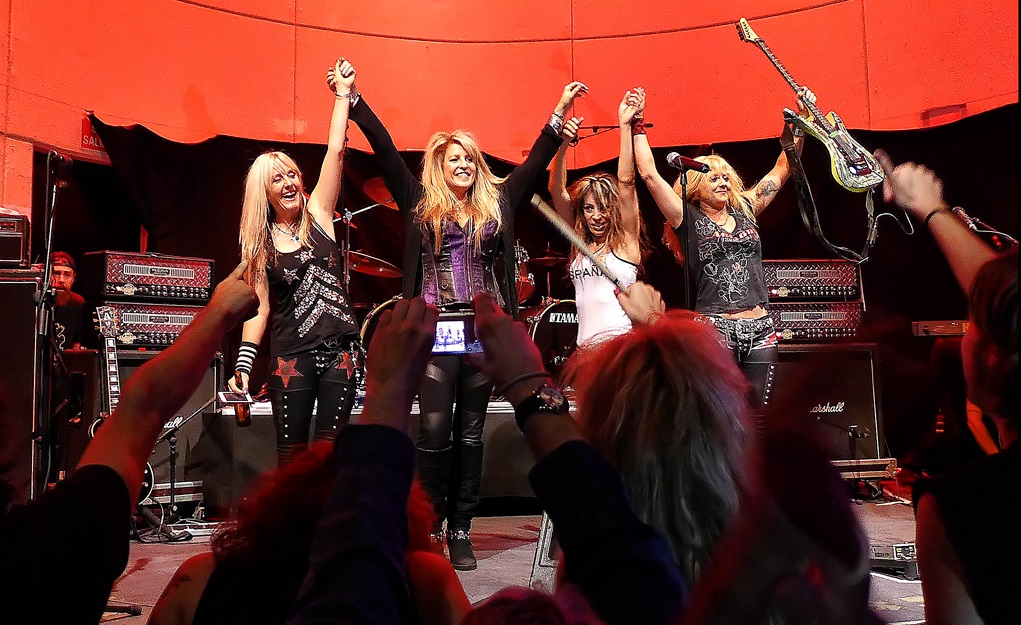
Vixen in 2014: (l-r) Share Ross, Janet Gardner, Roxy Petrucci, and Gina Stile

== Discography ==
Poison Dollys

- Poison Dollys (1985)

Envy

- Ain't It a Sin (1987)

Vixen

- Tangerine (1998)

Thunderbox

- Cherries N' Cream (2013) - Video

== Kramer guitars ==
Stile endorsed Kramer Guitars from 1985 to 1988 and endorsed them after 2014. (In 1986, she was asked to help develop a 3/4-size guitar geared toward women and children.)

== Guitar gear ==
- Amps – Mesa/Boogie Dual and Triple Rectifiers through a Marshall cab with Celestion Vintage 30 speakers.
- Guitars – Kramer Assault Plus, Gibson Les Paul, Snake Guitar, Rick Kelly Custom; Carmine Street Guitars.
- Effects – Boss pedalboard (Octaver-Chorus-Delay-Flanger) along with MXR Fullbore Metal.
