= Rosa Laricchiuta =

Canadian singer-songwriter (born 1974)

- Born: February 26, 1974 (age 52); Montreal, Quebec, Canada
- Origin: Montreal, Quebec, Canada
- Genre: Rock - pop rock
- Occupation: Singer-songwriter
- Labels: S7Productions; Pur Records; Frontiers Music SRL; Instinct Musique
- Member of: Trans-Siberian Orchestra; Vixen
- Formerly of: Black Rose Maze; Headpins
- Website: rosalaricchiuta.com

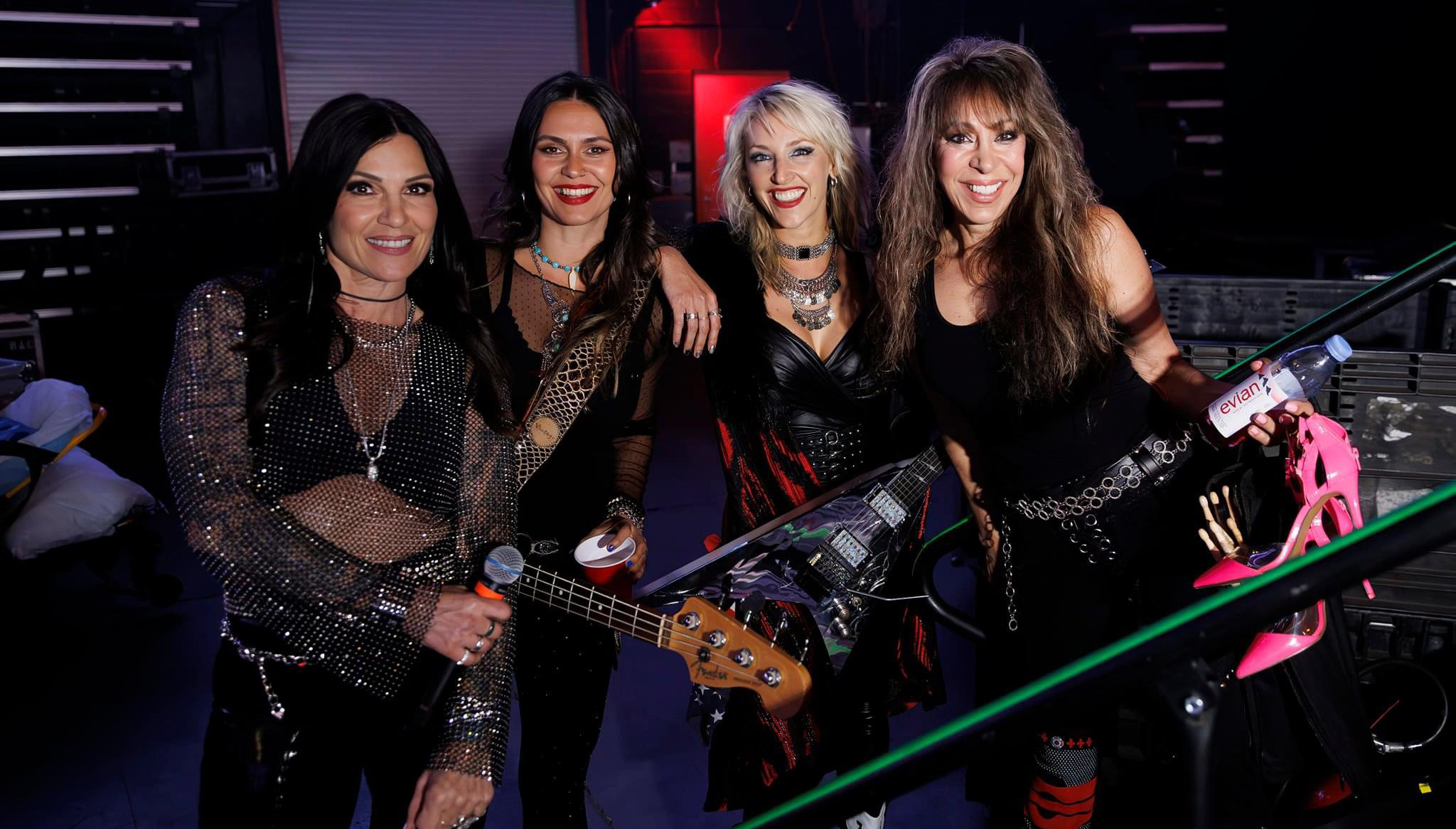
Laricchiuta with Vixen, 2024

Rosa Laricchiuta (born February 26, 1974) is a Canadian singer-songwriter from Montreal, Quebec. She gained recognition for her contributions to the music industry. She is currently the lead singer of the female hard rock band Vixen.

== Musical career ==
Laricchiuta's musical career began in the 2000s when she started singing at a karaoke bar in Montreal. A music agent noticed Rosa's talent and hired her to sing in 5 Stars Hotels and Casinos in Asia and the Middle East.

After a decade of touring internationally, Laricchiuta returned to Montreal before settling in New Brunswick. In 2015, Laricchiuta participated in the third season of the TVA reality show La Voix, the French Canadian version of the popular American show The Voice. Her rendition of Pink's "Perfect" during the blind auditions impressed all four coaches and she chose Quebec rocker Eric Lapointe as her mentor. Her performance of Queen's "The Show Must Go On" in the semi-finals showcased her powerful vocals and stage presence, leaving a notable impression on the Quebec music scene.

Following La Voix, Laricchiuta toured as Lapointe's backing vocalist, performed alongside artists such as Def Leppard and Kelly Clarkson, and collaborated with Melissa Etheridge. In 2015, she signed with S7 Productions and released her debut French album, Rosa which received significant attention and radio airplay in Quebec and New Brunswick. Her song "Manquer de toi" became a chart-topping hit.

Since 2016, Laricchiuta has been the lead singer for the Trans-Siberian Orchestra's USA West Coast tour, where she has received acclaim for her dynamic performances. In 2017, she released her first English EP, Free, and took on the role of Sadia in the rock opera musical Quebec Issime chante Starmania.

In August 2018, Laricchiuta signed a four-year contract with the record label Frontiers Music Srl and completed recording her full-length English rock album Black Rose Maze, slated for release in spring 2020. From 2022 to 2024, she was the new lead singer and frontwoman for the legendary Headpins, further establishing her impact on the Canadian music scene.

In October 2022, Laricchiuta joined Cirque du Soleil for performances in Saudi Arabia, showcasing her versatility and stage presence. This collaboration highlighted her ability to captivate international audiences.

In 2024, Laricchiuta signed with Quebec label Instinct Musique and released her album Untamed. The album, inspired by female artists who influenced her, showcases her raw talent and passion for music. Standout tracks on "Untamed" include two original compositions by Laricchiuta : "Miss You So" and "Hot Sex," showcasing her versatility as a songwriter.

Later, she was announced on stage June 21, 2024, as the new lead singer of the American all-female hard rock band Vixen. Her first performance with the band was that night at the Honda Center in Anaheim, California.

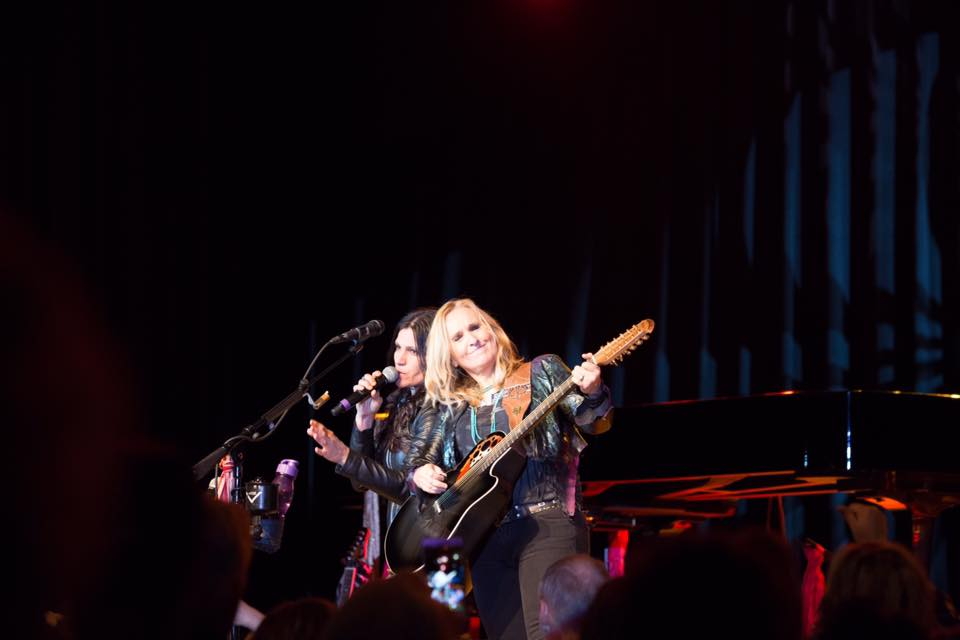
Rosa Laricchiuta and Melissa Etheridge performing in Moncton, Canada

== Discography ==
Solo albums:

- Rosa (2015)
- Free (2017)
- Black Rose Maze (2020)
- Untamed (2024)
