= Hardbodies =

1984 film by Mark Griffiths

- Theatrical release poster
- Directed by: Mark Griffiths
- Written by: Eric Alter; Steve Greene; Mark Griffiths
- Story by: Eric Alter; Steve Greene
- Produced by: Jeff Begun; Ken Dalton
- Starring: Grant Cramer; Teal Roberts; Gary Wood; Michael Rapport; Roberta Collins; Sorrells Pickard
- Cinematography: Tom Richmond
- Edited by: Andy Blumenthal
- Music by: Vic Caesar
- Production company: Chroma III Productions
- Distributed by: Columbia Pictures
- Release date: May 4, 1984 (Los Angeles)
- Running time: 88 minutes
- Country: United States
- Language: English
- Budget: less than $2 million or $1 million
- Box office: $7.1 million

Hardbodies is a 1984 American sex comedy film about three middle-aged men who hire a younger man to help them pick up women at the beach. The film was directed by Mark Griffiths, and stars Grant Cramer, Courtney Gains and Gary Wood. It was followed by a 1986 sequel entitled Hardbodies 2.

The film was partly financed by Roger Corman and features Roberta Collins in a supporting role.

== Plot ==
Scotty, a con man who does whatever he can to get along, is evicted from his apartment for non-payment of rent. He soon finds three older divorced men who have a lot of money, however they do not have a trait that Scotty possesses: talent with women. They agree to let Scotty stay with them at their beach house (and pay him $500 a month), if he returns the favor by teaching them how to pick up women.

Scotty shows them how to "dialogue" women by giving them a dose of the old BBD (Bigger and Better Deal). Along this journey, Scotty loses his playboy ways and falls in love with acquaintance Kristi. Kristi, knowing Scotty's playboy past, puts up with his ups and downs early on in the movie but later insists that he change his ways. Scotty recognizes that Kristi is ultimately more important than the empty life he has led up until now and changes his ways.

== Cast ==
- Grant Cramer as Scotty Palmer
- Teal Roberts as Kristi
- Courtney Gains as "Rag"
- Gary Wood as Hunter
- Darcy DeMoss as Dede
- Cindy Silver as Kimberly
- Sorrells Pickard as Ashby
- Kristi Somers as Michelle
- Michael Rapport as "Rounder"
- Roberta Collins as Lana
- Crystal Shaw Martell as Candy
- Emily Longstreth as Girl on Skates
- Kathleen Kinmont as Pretty Skater
- Janet Gardner as Diaper Rash Vocalist
- Jan Kuehnemund as Diaper Rash Lead Guitarist
- Tamara Ivanov as Diaper Rash Rhythm Guitarist
- Pia Maiocco as Diaper Rash Bassist
- Laurie Hedlund as Diaper Rash Drummer

== Production ==
The film was produced by Ken Dalton, a former actor, and Jeff Begun, who had previously made four films for Roger Corman, including Saturday the 14th. Corman provided seed money for their production company, Chroma III, to make the film independently, serving as an uncredited producer.

The film was based on an article in Penthouse. An initial plan to sell the film for broadcast on the Playboy Channel fell through when, according to Begun, the network found it "too soft." Instead, Columbia picked it up for theatrical distribution.

The movie featured an early appearance of the all-female rock band Vixen (then featuring Steve Vai's wife Pia) on the soundtrack and on-screen as the band Diaper Rash, five years before Vixen released their gold selling debut album and toured the world with the likes of Scorpions and Deep Purple.

== Release ==
Hardbodies was released in Los Angeles on May 4, 1984, and was followed by a New York release on May 12, 1984.

Chroma later made School Spirit for Corman.

== Reception ==
The film was unanimously panned by critics. On Metacritic the film has a score of 1 out of 100 based on reviews from four critics, indicating "overwhelming dislike".
