= Vixen (band) =

American rock band

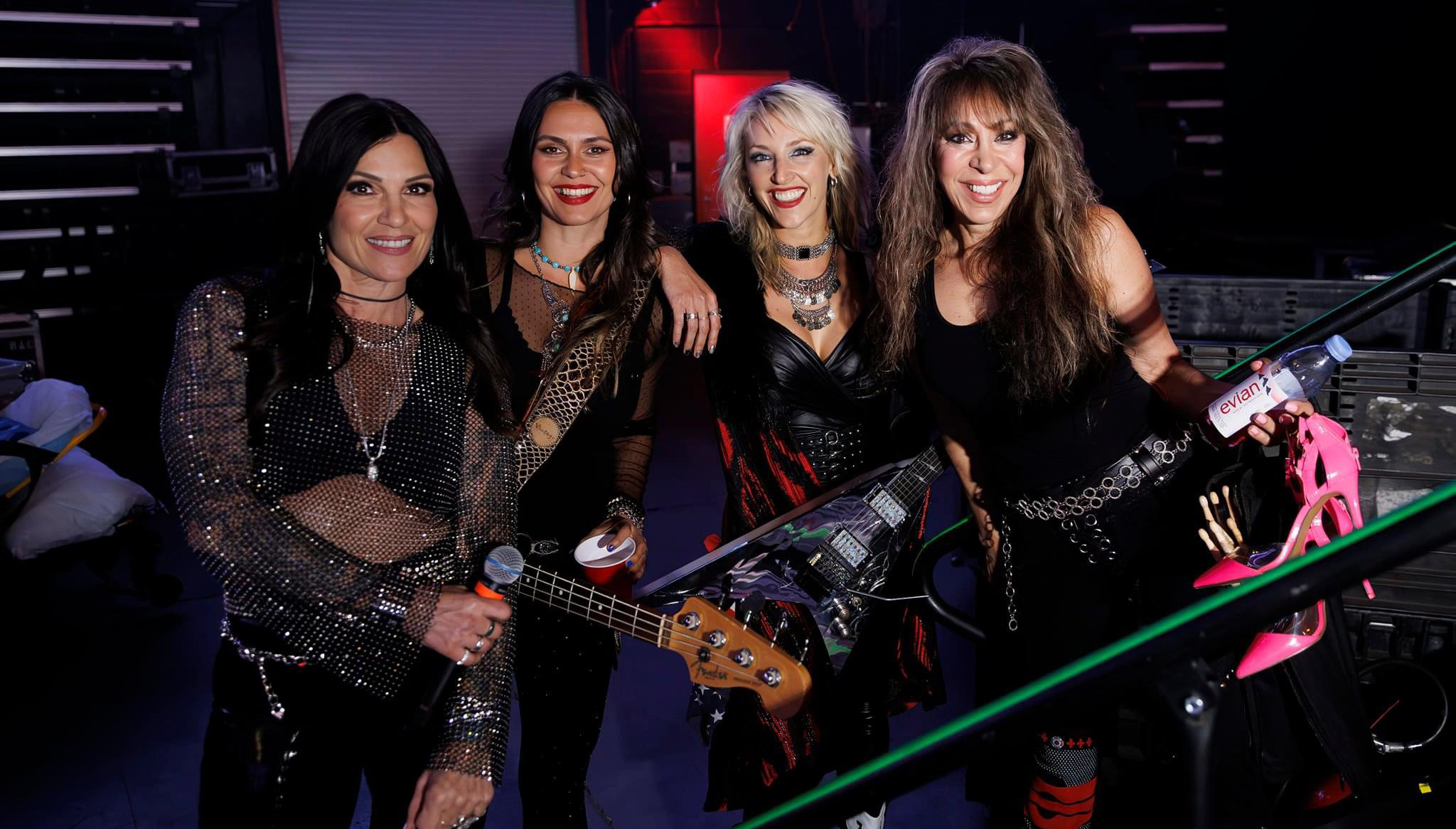
- Vixen in 2024 (L–R: Rosa Laricchiuta, Julia Lage, Britt Lightning, Roxy Petrucci)

Background information
- Also known as: Genesis (1973–1978); Diaper Rash (1984); VXN (2012); JSRG (2012–2013)
- Origin: Saint Paul, Minnesota, U.S.
- Genres: Hard rock; glam metal; AOR
- Years active: 1973–1992; 1997–1998; 2001–present
- Labels: EMI; Manhattan; CMC International; Eagle; Demolition
- Members: Roxy Petrucci; Britt Lightning; Julia Lage; Rosa Laricchiuta
- Past members: Jan Kuehnemund; Nancy Shanks; Janet Gardner; Share Ross; Gina Stile; Jenna Sanz-Agero; Lorraine Lewis
- Website: vixenofficial.com

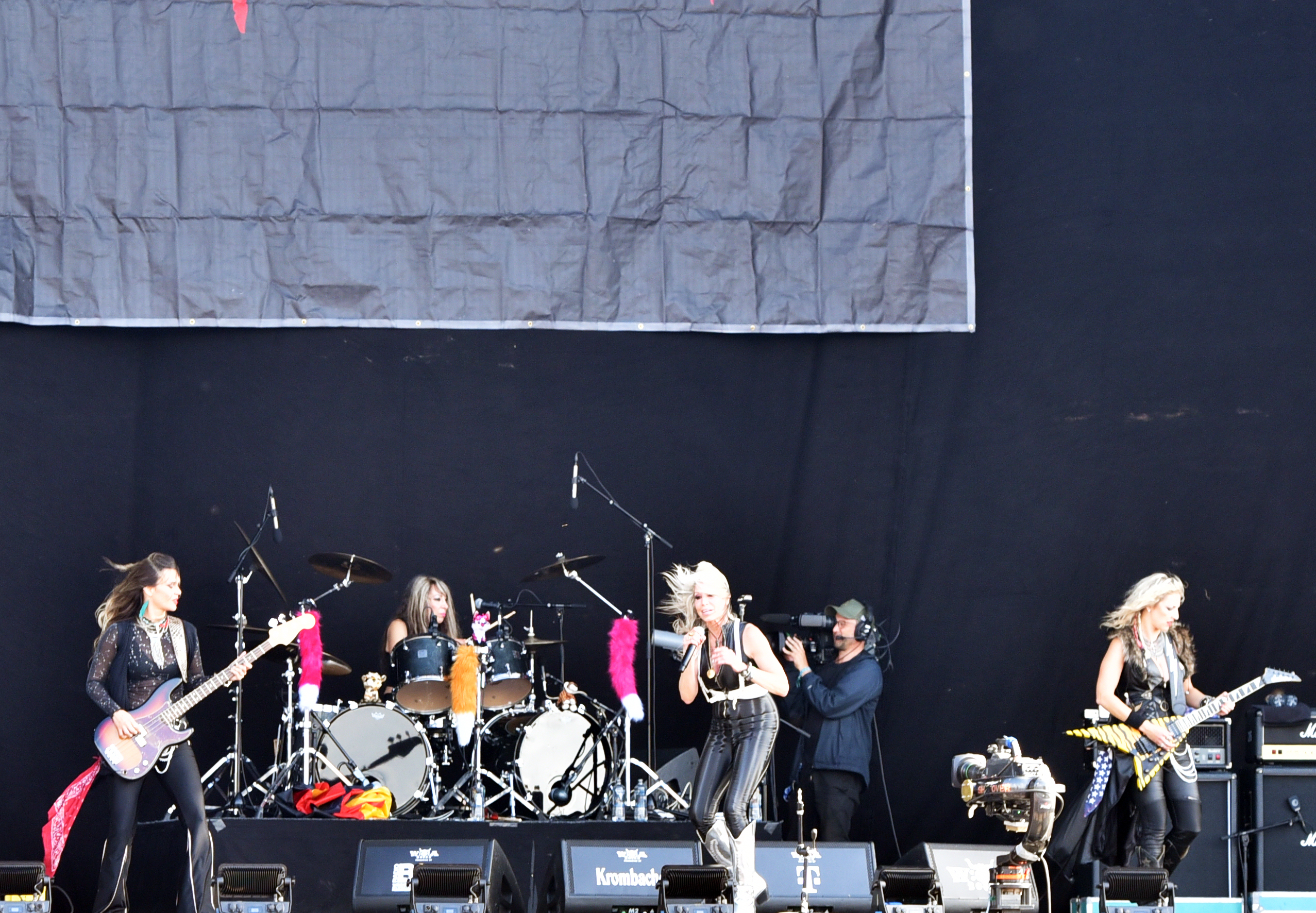
Vixen Band in 2023, (L–R) Julia Lage, Roxy Petrucci, Lorraine Lewis, Britt Lightning.

Vixen is an American all-female glam metal band formed in Saint Paul, Minnesota, in 1973. During its most commercially successful period from 1987 to 1992, the band consisted of Jan Kuehnemund (lead guitar), Janet Gardner (lead vocals, rhythm guitar), Share Ross (bass guitar), and Roxy Petrucci (drums).

The band's eponymous first album was released in 1988, and reached No. 41 on the Billboard 200. Their second studio album Rev It Up was released in 1990, and reached No. 52 on the Billboard 200. Those albums were followed by Tangerine in 1998 and Live & Learn in 2006.

Part of the Los Angeles, California, glam metal scene, the band has been described as "the female Bon Jovi." Several singles released by the band from 1988 to 1990 reached the Billboard Hot 100, including the Top 40 singles "Edge of a Broken Heart" at No. 26, and "Cryin'" at No. 22.

While the band originally disbanded in 1992, it reformed from 1997 to 1998 by Gardner and Petrucci but a lawsuit filed by Kuehnemund over ownership of the name ruled in her favor, ending that version of the band.

Kuehnemund reunited the band with the classic lineup in 2001, but disagreements caused Kuehnemund to quickly recruit a new version of the band with three new members; this lineup lasted until 2011. Kuehnemund died in 2013. From then on Gardner, Ross, and Petrucci reformed the band with Gina Stile on guitar.

As of June 21, 2024, the band currently consists of Petrucci, Britt Lightning, Julia Lage, and newly announced lead singer Rosa Laricchiuta.

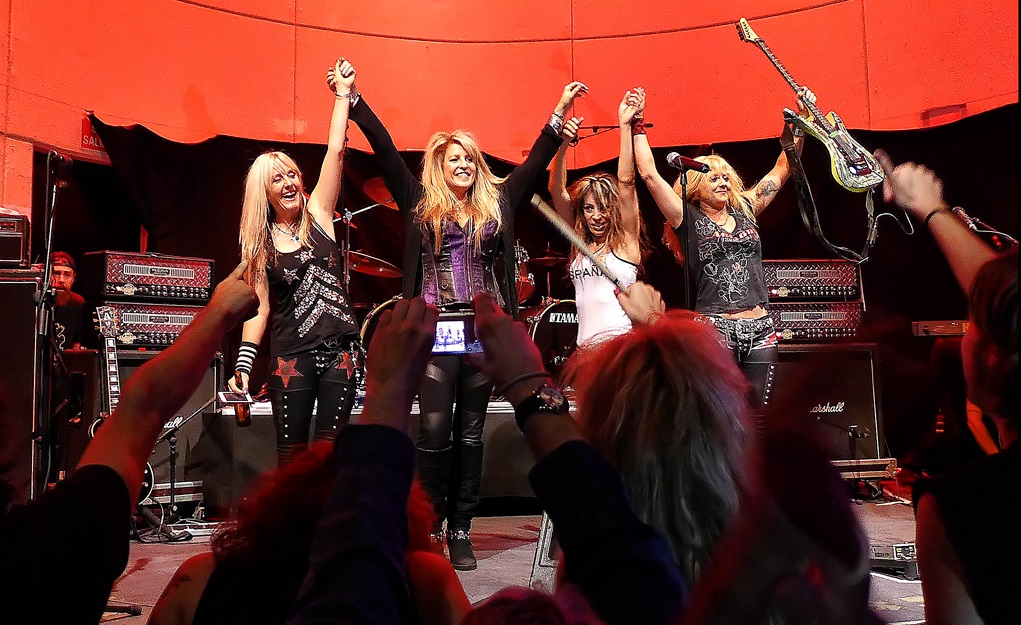
The band in 2014, (L–R) Sharon Ross, Janet Gardner, Roxy Petrucci, Gina Stile

== History ==
=== Early years ===
Vixen was formed in St. Paul, Minnesota in 1973 by guitarist Jan Kuehnemund after playing in the band Lemon Pepper in high school later changing the name to Genesis, which broke up in 1974. Nancy Shanks was her bandmate during that time and two drummers were featured, Marlene Peterson and Laurie Hedlund. Six years later she formed a new all-female rock band named Vixen with a new lineup.

Alex Henderson, writing for AllMusic, said they started in 1981 in Los Angeles, California, but Kuehnemund herself denied this. In 1984, an early version of the band with Kuehnemund, singer Janet Gardner, bassist Pia Maiocco, drummer Laurie Hedlund, and rhythm guitarist/singer-songwriter Tamara "Tammy" Ivanov appeared in the movie Hardbodies, as the on-screen band Diaper Rash. They were a quintet at that time, playing in a pop rock style. In 1985, the band moved to the inner areas of Los Angeles to join the city's rock scene.

=== Commercial success ===
Lineup changes happened during the following years until the "classic lineup" of Kuehnemund, Gardner, Roxy Petrucci, and Share Pedersen was formed. This lineup of Vixen was interviewed in 1987 along with many other rock artists of the day by Penelope Spheeris for her film The Decline of Western Civilization II: The Metal Years. All members except Kuehnemund appeared in the film.

In 1988, the band was signed to EMI Manhattan, and they began recording their self-titled debut album Vixen, which was released on August 31. Singer-songwriter Richard Marx co-wrote with Fee Waybill and arranged their signature hit, "Edge of a Broken Heart" and produced the song. Marx had nothing to do with their follow-up CD, since he was becoming more of a mainline singer than songwriter. Vixen spent the next year touring the world, supporting acts such as Ozzy Osbourne, Scorpions, and Bon Jovi, as well as headlining their own shows. The band returned to the studio in late 1989/early 1990 to record their follow-up album, Rev It Up, which was released in July 1990. A year of touring followed, including headlining their own shows and supporting acts such as Kiss and Deep Purple. After the tour concluded in mid-1991, the group disbanded in 1992 due to musical differences.

=== First reunion ===
In 1997, drummer Roxy Petrucci reformed Vixen, with Janet Gardner and recruited Gina Stile on lead guitar and Rana Ross, previously from Phantom Blue, on bass guitar. This lineup toured the United States later that year, and in 1998 Gardner, Stile, and Petrucci recorded the album Tangerine, which eventually became Stile's only album and Gardner's last during their respective tenures in the band. After the release of the new album, Roxy's sister Maxine Petrucci was brought in to play bass on a US tour during 1998, but they were sued successfully for trademark infringement by Kuehnemund. According to her, she realized that the rest of Vixen left her out and usurped her right to represent them.

In 1999, Share Ross joined her husband's band, The Dogs D'Amour, who reformed after a long hiatus. She appeared on their 2000 albums Happy Ever After and Seconds, playing bass, keyboards, and backing vocals, later leaving that band. Share and her husband, Bam, also had their own band, Bubble, which was very popular in L.A.

=== Second reunion ===
In 2001, Vixen was reformed by Kuehnemund with a lineup consisting of herself, Janet Gardner, Roxy Petrucci, and new bassist Pat Holloway. This lineup toured the US as part of the Voices of Metal tour. Halfway through the tour, disagreements with management caused the band to split-up, with only Kuehnemund remaining. Kuehnemund quickly recruited Jenna Sanz-Agero (Jenna Piccolo), Lynn Louise Lowrey, and Kathrin "Kat" Kraft to complete the tour. They released two new albums in 2006, a live album, recorded at a live show in Sweden, called Extended Versions, and a studio album, Live & Learn.

=== Later events ===
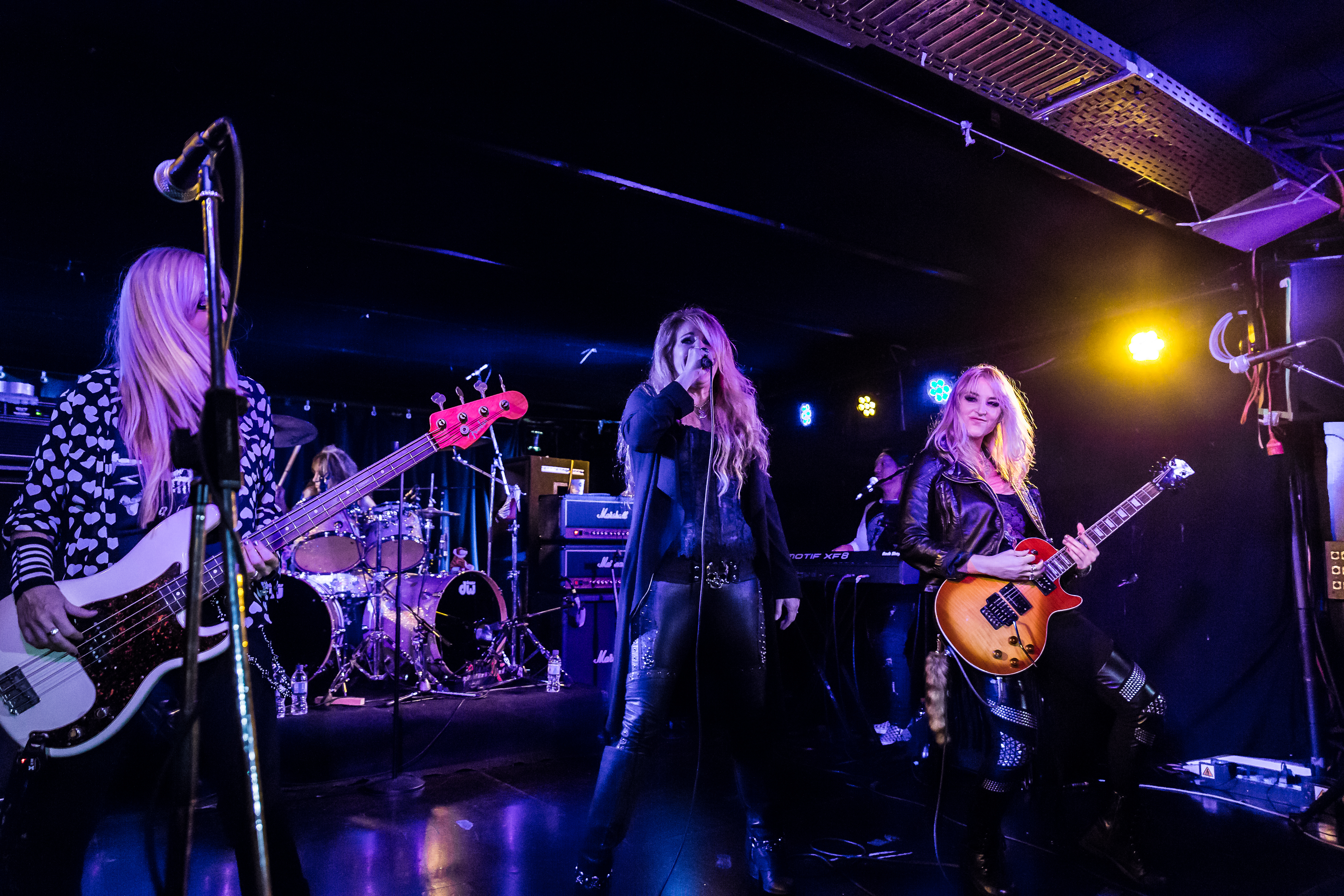
Vixen in Stuttgart, Germany, in 2018 (from left to right: Share Pedersen, Roxy Petrucci, Janet Gardner, and Britt Lightning)

In 2004, VH1 approached the four members of the "classic lineup" to appear on their show Bands Reunited. The show was recorded in August 2004 and broadcast in the U.S. in November 2004. Following the broadcast EMI's American label Capitol re-released the first two Vixen albums, Vixen and Rev It Up.

Vixen also won the sixth annual Independent Music Awards Vox Pop vote for Best Hard Rock/Metal Song for "I Try".

Sanz-Agero confirmed in a 2011 interview that a second album featuring the 2001 lineup was in the works and that a track called "I Understand" existed along with other new recordings and outtakes from the Live & Learn sessions. There has yet to be a proper release for these recordings because every member from that lineup has either retired from music or is pursuing non-musical careers.

At the end of 2012, Jan Kuehnemund was planning to reunite the classic Vixen lineup with Janet Gardner, Share Ross, and Roxy Petrucci, who had since reunited in JSRG with guitarist Gina Stile. In January 2013, days before they were about to make the official announcement of their reunion, Kuehnemund was diagnosed with cancer, forcing the announcement to be delayed indefinitely. On October 10, 2013, Kuehnemund died from cancer at the age of 59.

In December 2013, the three surviving classic lineup members with Gina Stile on guitar, decided to carry on under the name of Vixen in honor of Jan Kuehnemund.

They played several gigs in 2014 in the U.S., Spain, and Canada. In October 2014, drummer Roxy Petrucci said in an interview that Vixen was working on a new album, featuring one song dedicated to Jan Kuehnemund.

In March 2017, Vixen parted ways with lead guitarist Gina Stile and chose Britt Lightning to succeed her. Lightning had previously played in Jaded, another all-female band that is defunct. Initially, in a June 2018 interview, Petrucci said that the band's new album was to come out in 2019. During 2018, Gardner's last contribution as lead singer was when Vixen went to a studio for the first time in more than 10 years and recorded two tracks for the Live Fire album, "You Ought to Know by Now" and an acoustic version of "Edge of a Broken Heart". The former is their own cover of Ray Kennedy's "You Oughta Know by Now", originally on his 1980 self-titled album.

On January 16, 2019, Gardner confirmed in a Facebook post that she had definitely left Vixen, to devote more time to family and prioritize her solo career. The band later released a statement on their official Facebook page stating they plan to continue without Gardner and that a new studio album has been in the works for what would have been a 2019 release. On January 22, they announced that Lorraine Lewis of Femme Fatale, Vixen's contemporaries during the glam metal heyday and also an all-female band from its refoundation in 2013 until its dissolution later in 2019, became their new singer, starting with a performance on February 9 in Clearwater, Florida. Lewis met Petrucci and Ross during her past collaborations with them in Rocktopuss and L.A. Nookie, a local cover band, respectively. She later explained in May that the band's upcoming album would have had a tentative 2020 release year. However, this album's release stalled, with its recording and writing sessions being continual and infrequent throughout 2021 and 2022. Shortly after Gardner' departure, the band's early member Nancy Shanks died in May 2019 of amyotrophic lateral sclerosis (ALS) at the age of 63.

On February 8, 2022, bassist Share Ross announced she was taking a hiatus from the band and announced Julia Lage as her replacement, who is married to guitarist Richie Kotzen. Lage, a Brazilian, is Vixen's first member not from the United States. On October 2, 2023, the band released a new single "Red", co-written by Fred Coury, Carly Robyn Green and Peter Amato. This was their first release to feature Lewis on vocals and Lage on bass. On May 26, 2024, Lewis announced on her social media channels that she was no longer with Vixen as "The band has taken a different direction." The next day, May 27, the band announced it had already found a replacement lead singer. However, Lewis' replacement was not announced until June 21 at the Honda Center in Anaheim, CA when new lead singer Rosa Laricchiuta first took the stage with Vixen. They co-headlined the show with Great White, Slaughter, and Quiet Riot.

== Band members ==
Current members

- Roxy Petrucci – drums, backing vocals (1986–1992, 1997–1998, 2001, 2004, 2012–present)
- Britt Lightning – guitar, backing vocals (2017–present)
- Julia Lage – bass guitar, backing vocals (2022–present)
- Rosa Laricchiuta – lead vocals (2024–present)

Current touring members

- Tyson Leslie – keyboards, backing vocals (2017–present)

Former members

- Jan Kuehnemund – guitar (1971–1974, 1980–1992, 2001–2012; died 2013), backing vocals (1980–1992, 2001–2012)
- Nancy Shanks – bass guitar, lead vocals (1971–1974; died 2019)
- Laurie Hedlund – drums (1971–1973, 1980–1983, 1984–1986), backing vocals (1980–1983, 1984–1986)
- Marlene Peterson – drums (1971-1974)
- Gayle Erickson-DeMatoff – bass guitar, backing vocals (1980–1983)
- Cindy Boettcher – keyboards, backing vocals (1980–1983; died 2014)
- Noël Bucci – lead vocals (1980–1983)
- Janet Gardner – lead vocals, occasional guitar (1983–1992, 1997–1998, 2001, 2004, 2012–2019)
- Liza Carbé – bass guitar, backing vocals (1983–1984)
- Tamara Ivanov – guitar, backing vocals (1984–1986)
- Pia Vai (née Maiocco) – bass guitar, backing vocals (1984–1986)
- Share Ross (née Pedersen) – bass guitar, backing vocals (1987–1992, 2004, 2012–2022)
- Gina Stile – guitar, backing vocals (1997–1998, 2012–2017)
- Rana Ross – bass guitar, backing vocals (1997–1998; died 2003)
- Maxine Petrucci – bass guitar, backing vocals (1998)
- Pat Holloway – bass guitar, backing vocals (2001)
- Jenna Sanz-Agero – lead vocals (2001–2004, 2004–2012)
- Lynn Louise Lowrey – bass guitar, backing vocals (2001–2004, 2004–2012)
- Kathrin "Kat" Kraft – drums, backing vocals (2001–2004, 2004–2012)
- Lorraine Lewis – lead vocals (2019–2024)

Former touring members

- Michael Alemania – keyboards, backing vocals (1990–1992)
- Chris Fayz – keyboards, backing vocals (2005–2017), guitar (2005–2012)
- Ace Von Johnson – guitar (2018)

Timeline

== Discography ==
=== Studio albums ===
- Vixen (1988)
- Rev It Up (1990)
- Tangerine (1998)
- Live & Learn (2006)

=== Compilation albums ===
- The Best of Vixen: Full Throttle (1999)
- Vixen & Helix – Back 2 Back Hits (2000)
- Rare Vintage (2018)

=== Live albums ===
- Extended Versions – Live in Sweden (2006)
- Live Fire (2018)

=== Singles ===
Title	Release	Peak chart positions			Album
Title	Release	US	US Main	UK	Album
"Edge of a Broken Heart"	1988	26	24	51	Vixen
"Cryin'"	1989	22	22	27	Vixen
"Love Made Me"	1989	—	—	36	Vixen
"Edge of a Broken Heart"	1989	—	—	59	Vixen
"How Much Love"	1990	44	11	35	Rev It Up
"Love Is a Killer"	1990	71	—	41	Rev It Up
"Not a Minute Too Soon"	1991	—	—	37	Rev It Up
"You Ought to Know by Now"	2018	—	—	—	Live Fire
"Red"	2023	—	—	—	Non-album single
"—" denotes a recording that did not chart.

=== Soundtrack appearances ===
- Hardbodies (1984) with the songs "Runnin'", "Give It a Chance", "Mr. Cool", "Be with Me", "Maria", and "Computer Madness"
- Beverly Hills, 90210: "Slumber Party" (1991) with the song "Streets in Paradise"
- Beavis and Butt-Head: "Wall of Youth" (1994) with the song "Edge of a Broken Heart"

== Filmography ==
=== Video albums ===
- Revved Up! (1990)

=== Films ===
- Hardbodies (1984) as the band "Diaper Rash" (Janet Gardner, Jan Kuehnemund, Tamara Ivanov, Pia Maiocco, Laurie Hedlund)
- The Decline of Western Civilization Part II: The Metal Years (1988) (Cameo interviews with Janet Gardner, Share Pedersen and Roxy Petrucci)
