= Vixen (Vixen album) =

1988 studio album by Vixen

Studio album by Vixen
- Released: August 31, 1988
- Recorded: 1988
- Studio: The Pasha Music House (Hollywood, California) (Note: Tracks 4, 6 and 7); Capitol (Hollywood, California); Additional recording: Eldorado Recording, Iceberg, Rhett Lawrence, Ignited, Sunset Sound and Baby'O Recorders (Hollywood, California)
- Genre: Hair metal
- Length: 43:18
- Label: EMI Manhattan
- Producer: David Cole; Richard Marx; Rick Neigher; Spencer Proffer

Vixen chronology
Vixen (1988)	Rev It Up (1990)

Singles from Vixen
- 1. "Edge of a Broken Heart" Released: 1988; 2. "Cryin'" Released: 1989; 3. "Love Made Me" Released: 1989

Professional ratings
Review scores
Source	Rating
AllMusic	3.5/5 stars

Vixen is the debut studio album by American rock band Vixen, released on August 31, 1988, by EMI's Manhattan Records. It includes the singles "Edge of a Broken Heart" and "Cryin'", which reached numbers 26 and 22 on the Billboard Hot 100, respectively.

Richard Marx, one of the late 1980s' most successful recording artists, was heavily involved in Vixen's early career, co-producing the album and writing one of their highest-charting singles, "Edge of a Broken Heart".

The three songs co-written by Jeff Paris, "Cryin'", "One Night Alone" and the bonus track "Charmed Life" were previously released on Paris's 1987 solo album Wired Up. "Give It Away" is credited to Paris's real name Geoffrey Leib and was included on his previous album Race to Paradise from 1986.

Vixen was ranked at number 43 in Rolling Stone's list of the "50 Greatest Hair Metal Albums of All Time". The album was certified gold by the Recording Industry Association of America (RIAA) on February 6, 1989.

A remastered CD, featuring 6 bonus tracks, was reissued by Rock Candy Records in September 2023.

== Track listing ==
Side one
No.	Title	Writer(s)	Producer(s)	Length
1.	"Edge of a Broken Heart"	Richard Marx; Fee Waybill	Marx	4:24
2.	"I Want You to Rock Me"	David Cole; Janet Gardner	Cole; Rick Neigher	3:30
3.	"Cryin'"	Gregg Tripp; Jeff Paris	Cole; Neigher	3:32
4.	"American Dream"	Jon Butcher	Spencer Proffer	4:19
5.	"Desperate"	Brian Miku; Leah Santos; Jan Kuehnemund	Cole; Neigher	4:16

Side two
No.	Title	Writer(s)	Producer(s)	Length
6.	"One Night Alone"	Tripp; Paris	Proffer	3:50
7.	"Hell Raisers"	Scott Metaxas; Kenneth Dubman; Vixen; Proffer	Proffer	4:27
8.	"Love Made Me"	John Keller; Marcy Levy; Michael Caruso	Cole; Neigher	3:18
9.	"Waiting"	Kuehnemund; Gardner	Cole; Neigher	3:11
10.	"Cruisin'"	Kuehnemund; Gardner; Keith Krupp	Cole; Neigher	4:24

CD and cassette edition bonus track
No.	Title	Writer(s)	Producer(s)	Length
11.	"Charmed Life"	Tripp; Paris	Cole; Neigher	4:05

Japanese CD edition bonus track
No.	Title	Writer(s)	Length
11.	"Give It Away" (replaces "Charmed Life")	Geoff Leib; Michael Thompson	3:32

== Personnel ==
Credits adapted from the liner notes of Vixen.

Vixen

- Janet Gardner – lead vocals, rhythm guitar, background vocals
- Jan Kuehnemund – lead and rhythm guitar, background vocals
- Share Pedersen – bass, background vocals
- Roxy Petrucci – drums, background vocals

Additional personnel

- Richard Marx – keyboards, production, arrangements (track 1)
- Michael Landau - lead guitar (track 1)
- Vivian Campbell - acoustic guitar (track 5)
- Brian Foraker – engineering, mixing (track 1)
- David Cole – production, arrangements, engineering, mixing (tracks 2, 3, 5, 8–11)
- Rick Neigher – production, arrangements (tracks 2, 3, 5, 8–11)
- Spencer Proffer – production, arrangements (tracks 4, 6, 7)
- Hans Peter Huber – engineering (tracks 4, 6, 7)
- Peter Doell – additional engineering
- Annette Cisneros, Judy Clapp, Mark Stebbeds, Jimmy Perziosi – engineering assistance
- Greg Fulginiti – mastering at Artisan Sound Recorders (Hollywood, California)
- Susanne Marie Edgren, Lewis Kovac – production coordination
- Henry Marquez – creative direction
- Robert Fusfield – art direction
- Nels – photography
- Glen La Ferman – back cover photography

== Charts ==
=== Weekly charts ===
Weekly chart performance for Vixen
Chart (1988–1989)	Peak position
Finnish Albums (Suomen virallinen lista)	16
German Albums (Offizielle Top 100)	39
Swedish Albums (Sverigetopplistan)	47
UK Albums (OCC)	66
US Billboard 200	41

=== Year-end charts ===
Year-end chart performance for Vixen
Chart (1989)	Position
US Billboard 200	91

== Certifications ==
Certifications for Vixen
Region	Certification	Certified units/sales
United States (RIAA)	Gold	500,000^{^}
^{^} Shipments figures based on certification alone.
