= We Reserve the Right =

Studio album by Madam X
- Released: October 29, 1984
- Recorded: 1984
- Studios: Cherokee Studios, Los Angeles, California
- Genres: Glam metal; heavy metal
- Length: 33:57
- Label: Jet
- Producer: Rick Derringer

Madam X chronology
| We Reserve the Right (1984) | Monstrocity (2017) |

Singles from We Reserve the Right
- 1. "High in High School" Released: 1984 (UK only)

We Reserve the Right is the debut album by American heavy metal band Madam X, released on October 29, 1984, through Jet.

The album is dedicated to the memory of Antonio Petrucci, grandfather of Maxine and Roxy, and Mary Farkas.

Pendulum Productions, the company behind music videos for Motley Crue and other leading rock bands, filmed a mini-story for the opening track, "High in High School". The track isn’t so much a message for the drug-addicted generation, but rather for advice bassist Chris Doliber and Bret Kaiser’s students to "think about the golden rules, their textbooks".

A video for the track "We Reserve the Right to Rock" was released in January of the following year.

Doliber wrote or contributed to eight of the ten songs on the album.

Less than a year after the release of album, singer Bret Kaiser leaves to band. At the same time, the group was dropped from label Jet, and it is still known that in 1988, they didn’t record in the studio, limiting themselves exclusively to the live stage.

== Track listing ==
Liner notes are adapted from the original LP.

All tracks are written by Chris Doliber and Bret Kaiser, except where noted.

Side 1
| No. | Title | Writer(s) | Length |
|---|---|---|---|
| 1. | "High in High School" | | 3:36 |
| 2. | "Come One, Come All" | Doliber, Maxine Petrucci | 3:06 |
| 3. | "She's Hot Tonight" | Kaiser | 3:18 |
| 4. | "Dirty Girls" | | 3:18 |
| 5. | "Max Volume" (Instrumental) | Petrucci | 1:35 |
| 6. | "Metal in My Veins" | | 2:46 |

Side 2
| No. | Title | Writer(s) | Length |
|---|---|---|---|
| 1. | "Reserve the Right to Rock" | Doliber | 3:12 |
| 2. | "Good with Figures" | | 3:44 |
| 3. | "Cat's Got Your Tongue" | Doliber | 3:33 |
| 4. | "We Want Rock" | Kaiser | 2:56 |
| 5. | "Stand Up and Fight" | Doliber, Petrucci | 2:40 |
| Total length: | | | 33:57 |

== Personnel ==
Liner notes are adapted from the original LP.

Madam X

- Bret Kaiser - vocals (except track 5)
- Maxine Petrucci - guitars, backing vocals (except track 5)
- Chris "Godzilla" Doliber - bass, backing vocals (except track 5)
- Roxy Petrucci - drums, backing vocals (except track 5)

Production

- Rick Derringer - producer
- George Tutko - engineer
