= The Droogs =

American rock band

- Origin: Los Angeles, California, U.S.
- Genres: Garage rock; proto-punk
- Years active: 1972–1992

The Droogs were an American rock group from Los Angeles, California, United States, initially active between 1972 and 1992, with the majority of releases from the mid-1980s onwards.

== History ==
The Droogs were formed in 1972, by Ric Albin (vocals), Roger Clay (guitar), Paul Motter (bass), and Kyle Raven (drums). Inspired by 1960s garage rock and with their early sound later categorized by Trouser Press as "protopunk", they released six singles during the 1970s (later collected on the Anthology album), with several changes of personnel in the rhythm section.

The line-up stabilized in the early 1980s with David Provost (formerly of Dream Syndicate) on bass/keyboards and Jon Gerlach on drums. In the mid-1980s, the band was considered part of the Paisley Underground scene, but found greatest success in Europe, and in 1987 signed to the German label, Music Maniac.

1996's release of Atomic Garage led to the band's dual performances at the 1997 Roskilde Festival, one of which was broadcast on Danish National Radio. The group was included on Rhino's boxed set, Children Of Nuggets in 2005. The following year saw the CD release of Collection, select album tracks to reach digital platforms. In 2013, the Droogs contributed to Conspiracy A-Go-Go, a themed compilation on JFK's post mortem. 2017 marks the release of Young Gun, featuring ten new songs and a cover of the Seeds, "Out of the Question". The line-up on the album is Ric Albin (vocals), Roger Clay (guitar), Dave Provost (bass), Dave Klein (drums) and as co-producer/engineer.

== Discography ==
=== Singles, EPs ===
- "He's Waiting"/"Light Bulb Blues" (former credited to Gerry Roslie) (1973)
- Live and let die (1973)
- "Set My Love on You" (1974)
- "Ahead of my Time" (1974)
- "Overnite Success/Last Laugh" (1975)
- "As Much As I Want" (1979)
- Heads Examined (1983) [EP/mini-album]
- "Change Is Gonna Come" (1984)
- "Only Game In Town/Garden Of My Mind" (1984)
- "Collector's Item" (1986)
- "TV Man" (1993)
- "Come Heaven or Hell" (1993)

=== Albums ===
- Stone Cold World (1984) Passport
- Kingdom Day (1987) PVC
- Mad Dog Dreams (1990) Music Maniac
- Live in Europe (1990) Music Maniac
- Want Something (1991)
- Guerrilla Love-In (1991) Music Maniac
- Atomic Garage (1997) Impossible Records
- Young Gun (2017) Plug N Socket

=== Compilations ===
- Anthology (1987) Music Maniac
- Collection (2006) Plug N Socket
