= Roxy Petrucci =

American drummer (born 1962)

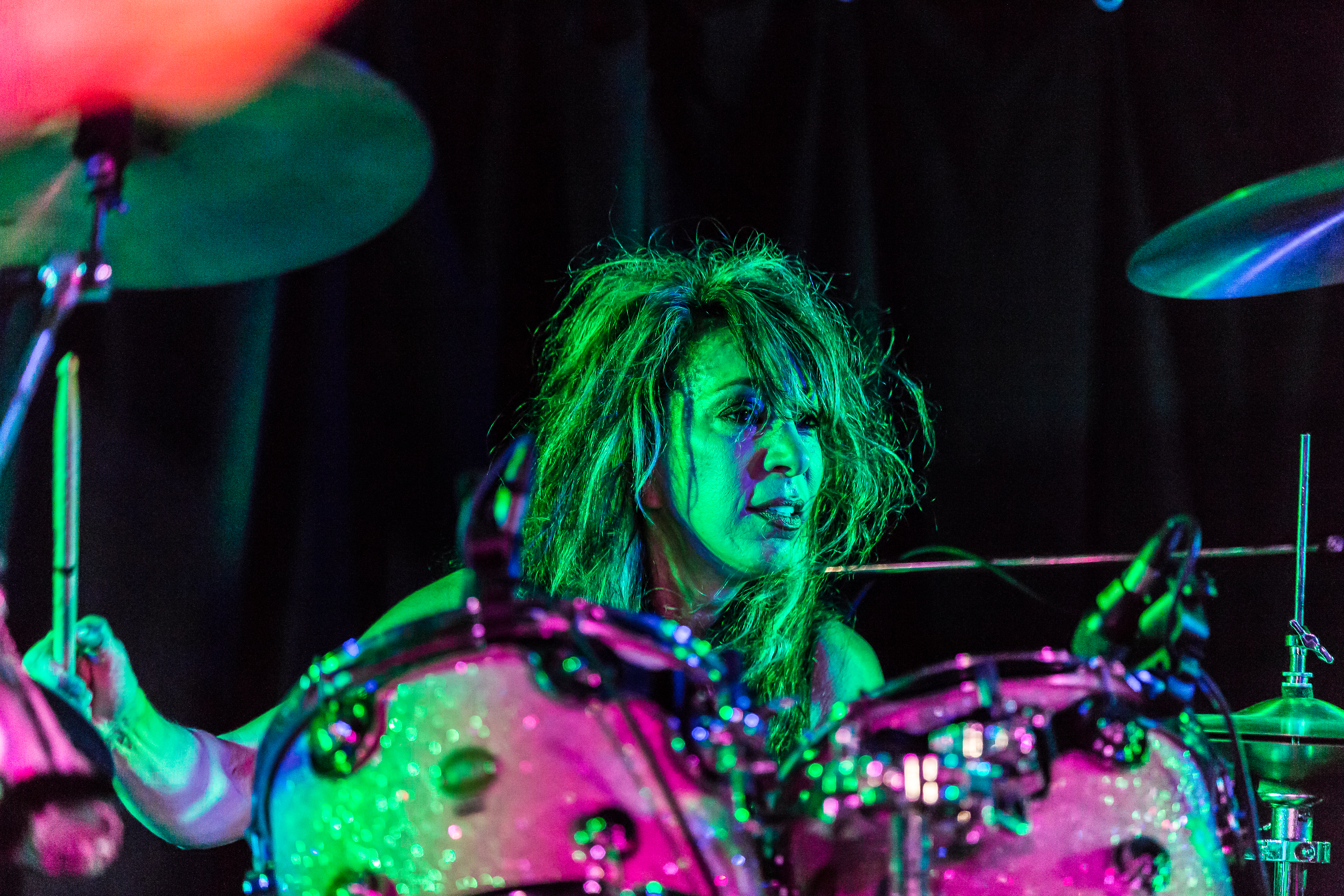
- Petrucci in Stuttgart, Germany, October 21, 2018

Background information
- Born: Roxanne Dora Petrucci; March 17, 1962 (age 64)
- Origin: Rochester, Michigan
- Genres: Glam metal, hard rock, heavy metal, post-grunge
- Occupations: Drummer, songwriter
- Instruments: Drums, Clarinet
- Years active: 1981–1991, 1997–1998, 2001, 2004–present
- Website: official site

Roxanne Dora Petrucci (born March 17, 1962) is an American drummer best known for her work with the glam metal bands Madam X and Vixen.

== Biography ==
Petrucci and her sister, Maxine Petrucci, first formed Madam X with vocalist Bret Kaiser and Chris Doliber. She left Madam X to join Vixen in 1986 and stayed until 1991. Roxy returned when Vixen reunited in 1997, bringing in her sister Maxine into the fold, but the lineup had to be dissolved the next year for legal reasons. She later rejoined a Jan Kuehnemund-led Vixen, but the reunion ended in 2001. In 2004, VH1 approached the four members of the "classic lineup" to appear on their show, Bands Reunited. The show was recorded in August 2004, and broadcast in the U.S. in November 2004. Following the broadcast of the VH1 show, EMI's American label Capitol re-released the first two Vixen albums, Vixen and Rev It Up.

In 2012, Janet Gardner, Share Pedersen, and Petrucci announced they and Gina Stile would form their own band. Thus, they became known as JanetShareRoxyGina (or JSRG for short). JSRG began playing shows at the end of 2012, followed by touring on the Monsters of Rock cruise in March 2013, and performing at the tenth anniversary of the melodic rock festival Firefest in the UK later in October. In December, JSRG evolved into Vixen to honor Kuehnemund's posthumous legacy. Petrucci also played for Roktopuss with former Femme Fatale vocalist and future Vixen bandmate Lorraine Lewis, who succeeded Gardner on vocals in January 2019 after the latter stepped down.

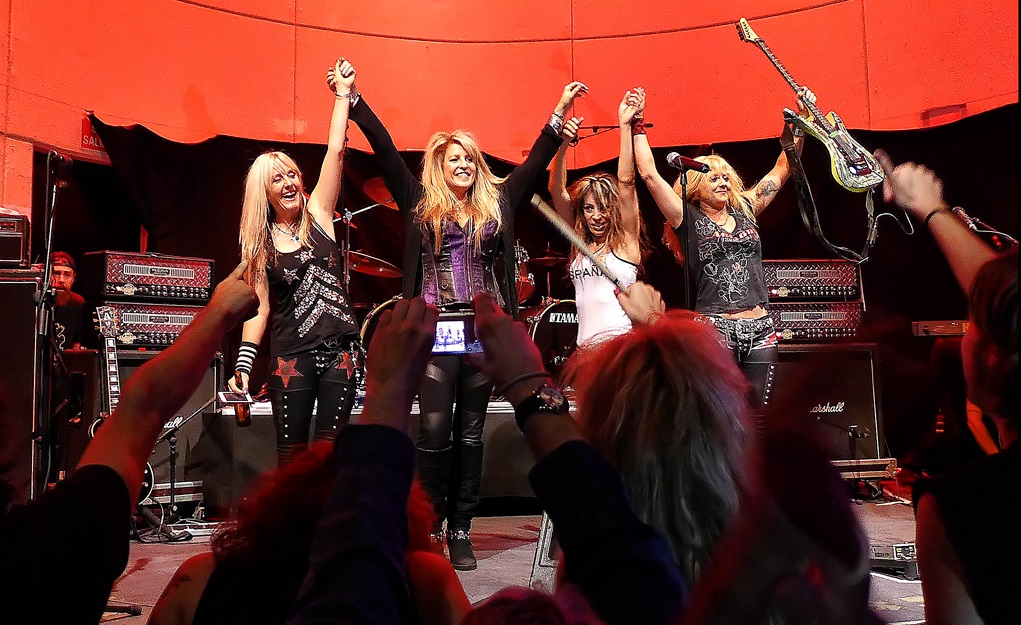
Vixen in 2014: (l-r) Share Ross, Gardner, Roxy Petrucci, and Gina Stile

== Bands ==
- Madam X (1984–1986, 1991, 2014–current)
- Vixen (1986–1991, 1997–1998, 2001, 2004, 2013–current)
- Roktopuss (2006–2013)
- JSRG (2012–2013)

== Discography ==
Madam X

- We Reserve the Right (1984)
- Monstrocity (2017)

Vixen

- Vixen (1988)
- Rev It Up (1990)
- Tangerine (1998)
- Rare Vintage (2018)
- Live Fire (2018)
- "Red" (2023) (Non-album single)

Maxine Petrucci

- Titania (2006)

Docker's Guild

- The Heisenberg Diaries - Book A: Sounds of Future Past (2016)

== Filmography ==
Video albums

- Vixen - Revved Up! (1990)

Films

- The Decline of Western Civilization Part II: The Metal Years (1988) (Cameo interviews with Janet Gardner, Share Pedersen and Roxy Petrucci)
