= Edge of a Broken Heart (Vixen song) =

1988 single by Vixen

Single by Vixen

from the album Vixen
- B-side: "Cruisin'" (US); "Charmed Life" (UK)
- Released: 1988
- Recorded: 1988
- Genre: Glam metal
- Length: 3:46 (single); 4:24 (album track); 6:35 (extended version)
- Label: Manhattan (US), EMI (UK)
- Songwriters: Richard Marx, Fee Waybill
- Producer: Richard Marx

Vixen singles chronology
"Edge of a Broken Heart" (1988)	"Cryin" (1989)

"Edge of a Broken Heart" is a power ballad by the American glam metal band Vixen, that was released as a single in 1988. It was written by Richard Marx, who was also on keyboards, and Fee Waybill. The song peaked at No. 26 on the Billboard Hot 100, and although the band had another top 40 hit on that chart, "Cryin'" (which actually peaked at #22, four spots higher than "Edge of a Broken Heart"), they are often cited as a one-hit wonder, with this song "being their one hit". According to Marx's memoir Stories to Tell, Michael Landau, not the band's Jan Kuehnemund, played lead guitar on this song.

== Music video ==
The song's video received heavy rotation on MTV. Richard Marx, a popular soft rock artist and co-writer/producer of this song, has a cameo in the video.

== Legacy ==
In 2018, Vixen released a new acoustic version of the song on their Live Fire album.

== Charts ==
Year	Chart	Position
1988	Billboard Hot 100	26
1988	Mainstream Rock	24
1988	UK Singles Chart	51
1989	UK Singles Chart	59
