= Rev It Up =

Studio album by Vixen
- Released: July 31, 1990
- Recorded: May 1990
- Studios: A&M (Hollywood); Rumbo Recorders (Canoga Park); Cherokee (Los Angeles); Ground Control (Los Angeles)
- Genres: Glam metal; hard rock
- Length: 51:54
- Label: EMI
- Producer: Randy Nicklaus

Vixen chronology
Vixen (1988)	Rev It Up (1990)	Tangerine (1998)

Singles from Rev It Up
- 1. "Love Is a Killer" Released: 1990; 2. "How Much Love" Released: 1990; 3. "Not a Minute Too Soon" Released: 1990

Rev It Up is the second album by the American glam metal band Vixen, released on July 31, 1990, through EMI. It entered the UK Albums Chart at No. 20, and placed two songs inside the Billboard Hot 100. However, it did not match up to its predecessor in the US and EMI dropped the band shortly thereafter. Therefore, this album is the band's last release from a major label. The race car on the US cover belonged to local racing legend and all around hero Bobby Baldwin. The European and Japanese covers show a picture of the band, which is on the back cover for the US release. A remastered version was released on CD by Rock Candy Records in February 2023.

== Reception ==
Professional ratings
Review scores
Source	Rating
AllMusic	3/5 stars
Select	2/5 medals

Rev It Up received generally mixed reviews from critics, including a score of 3 out of 5 from AllMusic.

== Track listing ==
No.	Title	Writer(s)	Length
1.	"Rev It Up"	Janet Gardner, Share Pedersen, Ron Keel, Steve Diamond	5:00
2.	"How Much Love"	Jan Kuehnemund, Jack Conrad, Steve Plunkett	4:40
3.	"Love Is a Killer"	Roxy Petrucci, Harry Paress	4:43
4.	"Not a Minute Too Soon"	Gardner, Pedersen	4:26
5.	"Streets in Paradise"	Kuehnemund, Conrad, Plunkett	4:32
6.	"Hard 16"	Pedersen, Gardner	4:05
7.	"Bad Reputation"	Kuehnemund, Gardner, Brian Miku	4:09
8.	"Fallen Hero"	Kuehnemund, Petrucci, Ralph Carter	5:17
9.	"Only a Heartbeat Away"	Pedersen, Gardner	5:07
10.	"It Wouldn't Be Love"	Diane Warren	4:42
11.	"Wrecking Ball"	Pedersen, Gardner	5:10

Japanese edition bonus tracks
No.	Title	Writer(s)	Length
12.	"Edge of a Broken Heart" (live)	Richard Marx, Fee Waybill	4:53
13.	"Cruisin'" (live)	Kuehnemund, Gardner, Keith Krupp	5:01

2006 Japanese remastered edition bonus tracks
No.	Title	Writer(s)	Length
12.	"Highway to Heartache" (previously unreleased)	Gardner, Kuehnemund, Pedersen, Petrucci	3:51
13.	"I Want You to Rock Me" (live at Daytona Beach, 1989)	David Cole, Gardner	4:50

== Personnel ==
Vixen is

- Janet Gardner – lead vocals
- Jan Kuehnemund – guitar, backing vocals
- Share Pedersen – bass, backing vocals
- Roxy Petrucci – drums, backing vocals

Additional musicians

- Michael Alemania – keyboards

Production

- Randy Nicklaus - producer
- Dennis MacKay - engineer
- Chad Blinman, Chris Fuhrman, Mike Gunderson, Gina Immel, Rob Jacobs, Bill Kennedy, Chad Munsey - assistant engineers
- Mike Shipley - mixing
- George Marino - mastering at Sterling Sound, New York
- Mark Sullivan - production coordinator
- David Reilly - sound technician for Jan Kuehnemund's guitar
- Jack Benson - second engineer

== Charts ==
Chart performance for Rev It Up
Chart (1990)	Peak position
Canada Top Albums/CDs (RPM)	90
European Albums (Music & Media)	41
Finnish Albums (Suomen virallinen lista)	14
German Albums (Offizielle Top 100)	29
Swedish Albums (Sverigetopplistan)	36
Swiss Albums (Schweizer Hitparade)	14
UK Albums (Official Charts)	20
US Billboard 200	52
