= Share Ross =

American musician

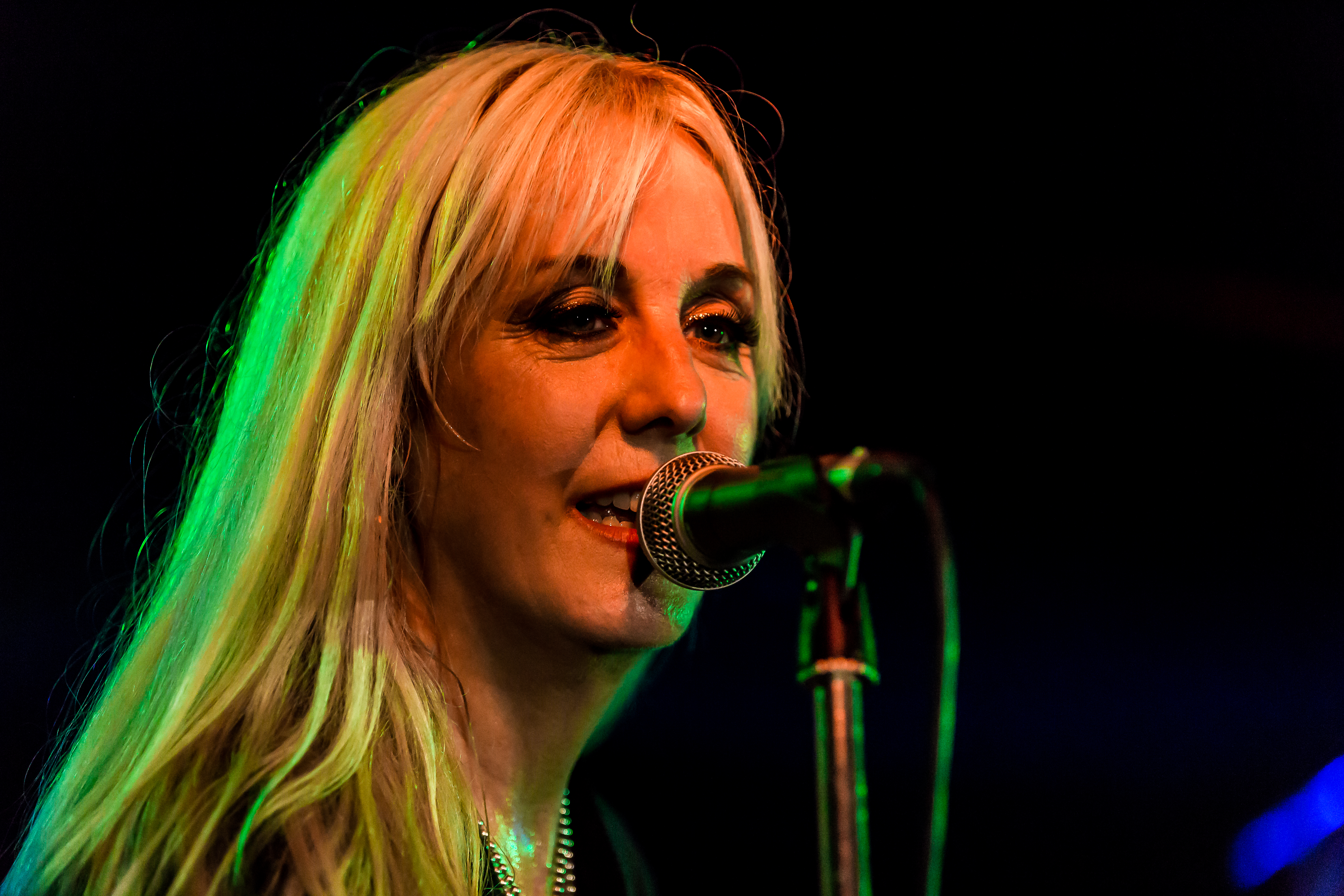
- Ross performing with Vixen in Stuttgart, Germany, October 21, 2018

Background information
- Also known as: Share Pederson
- Born: Sharon June Howe; March 21, 1963 (age 63)
- Origin: Glencoe, Minnesota
- Genres: Hard rock; pop rock; glam rock; heavy metal
- Occupations: Bassist; songwriter
- Instruments: Bass guitar; guitar; keyboards; vocals
- Years active: Early 1980s–2022 (on hiatus)
- Formerly of: Vixen, Contraband, Bubble, Down 'n' Outz, The Dogs D'Amour, The Quireboys

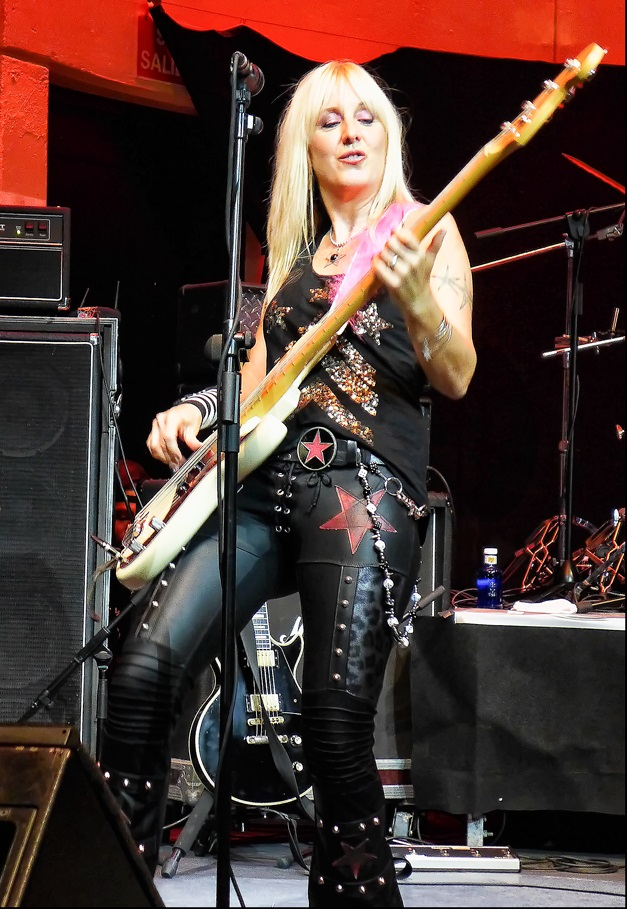
Ross in 2014

Sharon June "Share" Ross (formerly Pedersen; born Sharon June Howe; March 21, 1963 in Glencoe, Minnesota) is an American musician. She was the bassist, and high-harmony vocalist of the female glam metal/hard rock band, Vixen, from whom she has been on hiatus since February 2022.

== Music career ==
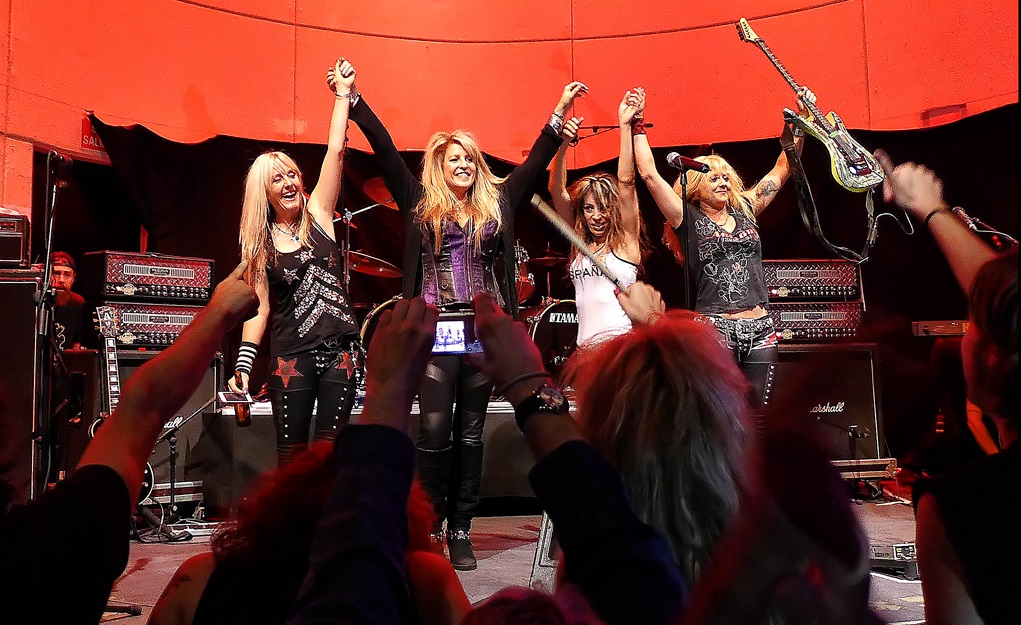
Vixen in 2014: (l-r) Share Ross, Gardner, Roxy Petrucci, and Gina Stile

Ross joined Vixen in 1987, replacing Pia Maiocco, and remained with the band until 1992. While in Vixen, as a side project, she co-formed the supergroup, Contraband, releasing only one album in 1991. When Vixen reunited in 1997, she declined as she and her husband, Bam had formed the group, Bubble.

In 1997, Denny Freeman invited Ross to play bass for his album, A Tone for my Sins.

In 1999, Ross and her husband Bam co-wrote the songs on Jesse Camp's debut album, Jesse & The 8th Street Kidz.

The first Bubble album was Ross on guitar and lead vocals, Bam on drums along with Brent Muscat, guitar and Eric Stacy, bass of Faster Pussycat. Bubble won Song of the Year in the John Lennon Songwriting Contest in 2000 with their song, Sparkle Star. It was also featured in the film starring Daryl Hannah, Dancing at the Blue Iguana.

In 2003, Ross toured with her husband's band, The Dogs D'Amour, and opened up for Alice Cooper on a European tour. She contributed to two albums that were released in 2000 for his band before the couple left the group after the tour.

In 2004, she and most well-known lineup of Vixen did briefly reunite to perform for VH1's Bands Reunited.

In 2006, Ross became the host and co-producer of the now-defunct video podcast Rock n Roll TV, an online show which featured up-and-coming punk/garage/rock bands and rock news, and in 2010, she played for one night only in a cover band L.A. Nookie, with future Vixen bandmate, Femme Fatale's Lorraine Lewis on vocals, to support Ratt at the latter's party for the release of their seventh and most recent album Infestation. As Share Pedersen, Ross recorded with Ratt's former drummer Bobby Blotzer on Contraband's lone, self-titled album.

In 2012, Ross reunited with her former Vixen bandmates, Roxy Petrucci and Janet Gardner, along with Gina Stile to form a new band originally known as "VXN" and now using simply their names as the band name of JanetShareRoxyGina (or JSRG for short). The band began performing shows in late 2012 and went on tour with the Monsters of Rock cruise in 2013. Late in 2013 JSRG changed their name back to Vixen in accordance with the wishes of founding member and guitarist Jan Kuehnemund who was unable to be part of the reformed band due to her battle with cancer and shock passing on October 10, 2013.

After sitting in on bass with The Quireboys during the 2014 Monsters of Rock Cruise (due to the absence of their regular bassist), she was invited to join Joe Elliott's Down 'n' Outz on their December 2014 UK tour. This Is How We Roll, her first album with that band, came out on October 11, 2019.

In contrast to all of Vixen's past concerts, Ross, who has sung lead for several Bubble albums and Twin Flames Radio, handles lead vocals on the band's cover of "I Don't Need No Doctor" during their recent live tours instead of Gardner, Vixen's long-time lead singer.

On February 8, 2022, Ross announced her hiatus from the band and announced Brazilian Julia Lage as her touring replacement.

== Personal life ==
Share and her husband, Bam Ross, adopted a raw vegan lifestyle in 2006 through the Raw Pirate Gourmet.

Ross is a licensed real estate agent in the state of Florida. In addition to her musical career, Ross has been a life coach, specializing in confidence-building, with particular reference to self-promotion via video, with her "Video Rockstar University" program, and a motivational course, "MESH". Her programs were predominantly targeted at self-employed businesswomen.

She has also published a book of hip knitting designs, Punk Knits published by Stewart, Tabori and Chang.

== Discography ==
Vixen

- Vixen (1988)
- Rev It Up (1990)
- The Best Of Vixen: Full Throttle (1999)
- Vixen & Helix - Back 2 Back Hits (2000)
- Rare Vintage (2018)
- Live Fire (2018)

Contraband

- Contraband (1991)

Denny Freeman

- A Tone for my Sins (1997)

Jesse Camp & The 8th Street Kidz

- Jesse Camp & The 8th Street Kidz (1999)

Bubble

- How 'Bout This? (2000)
- Miss Hellaneous (2001)
- Bubble/Black Halos Split Xmas CD (2001)
- Rockets & Volcanoes (2001)
- Total Harmonic Distortion (2002)
- Rock n Roll Hell (2004)

The Dogs D'Amour

- Happy Ever After (2000)
- Seconds (2000)

Down 'n' Outz

- The Further Live Adventures (2015)
- This Is How We Roll (2019) – Best British Album – Planet Rock Awards

Twin Flames Radio

- Twin Flames Radio (2018)

Ginger Wildheart

- Ginger Wildheart's Birthday Bash 2018 At The Garage in London (2018)

== Filmography ==
Video albums

- Vixen - Revved Up! (1990)

Films

- The Decline of Western Civilization Part II: The Metal Years (1988) (Cameo interviews with Janet Gardner, Share Pedersen and Roxy Petrucci)
