= Janet Gardner =

American rock singer (born 1962)

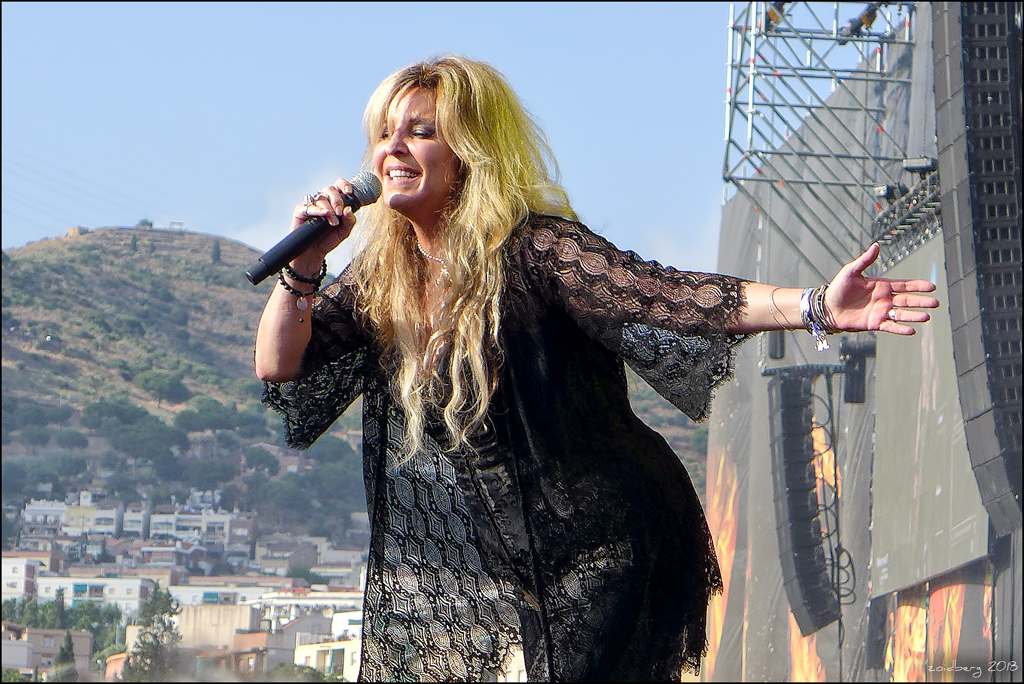
- Gardner performing in 2018

Background information
- Born: Janet Patricia Gardner; March 21, 1962 (age 64); Juneau, Alaska, U.S.
- Genres: Hard rock; glam metal; pop rock; post-grunge
- Occupations: Musician; vocalist; guitarist; songwriter
- Instruments: Vocals; guitar; tambourine
- Years active: 1983–92; 1997–98; 2001; 2004–present
- Formerly of: Vixen

Janet Patricia Gardner (born March 21, 1962) is an American rock singer. She is best known as the former lead vocalist and rhythm guitarist of the all-female glam metal band Vixen joining in 1983. She was the band's longest serving vocalist having performed on three of the band's four studio albums. When Vixen broke up in 1992 she took a hiatus from singing to pursue personal endeavors. She briefly unofficially reformed Vixen in 1997 with drummer Roxy Petrucci. She returned to Vixen in 2001, later studying to become a dental hygienist. In 2004 she took part in a Vixen reunion for a one-night-only gig as part of VH1's Bands Reunited TV show. She returned to Vixen full-time in 2012.

In 2017, she released her self-titled debut solo album and in 2019 decided to leave Vixen to focus on family and her solo career.

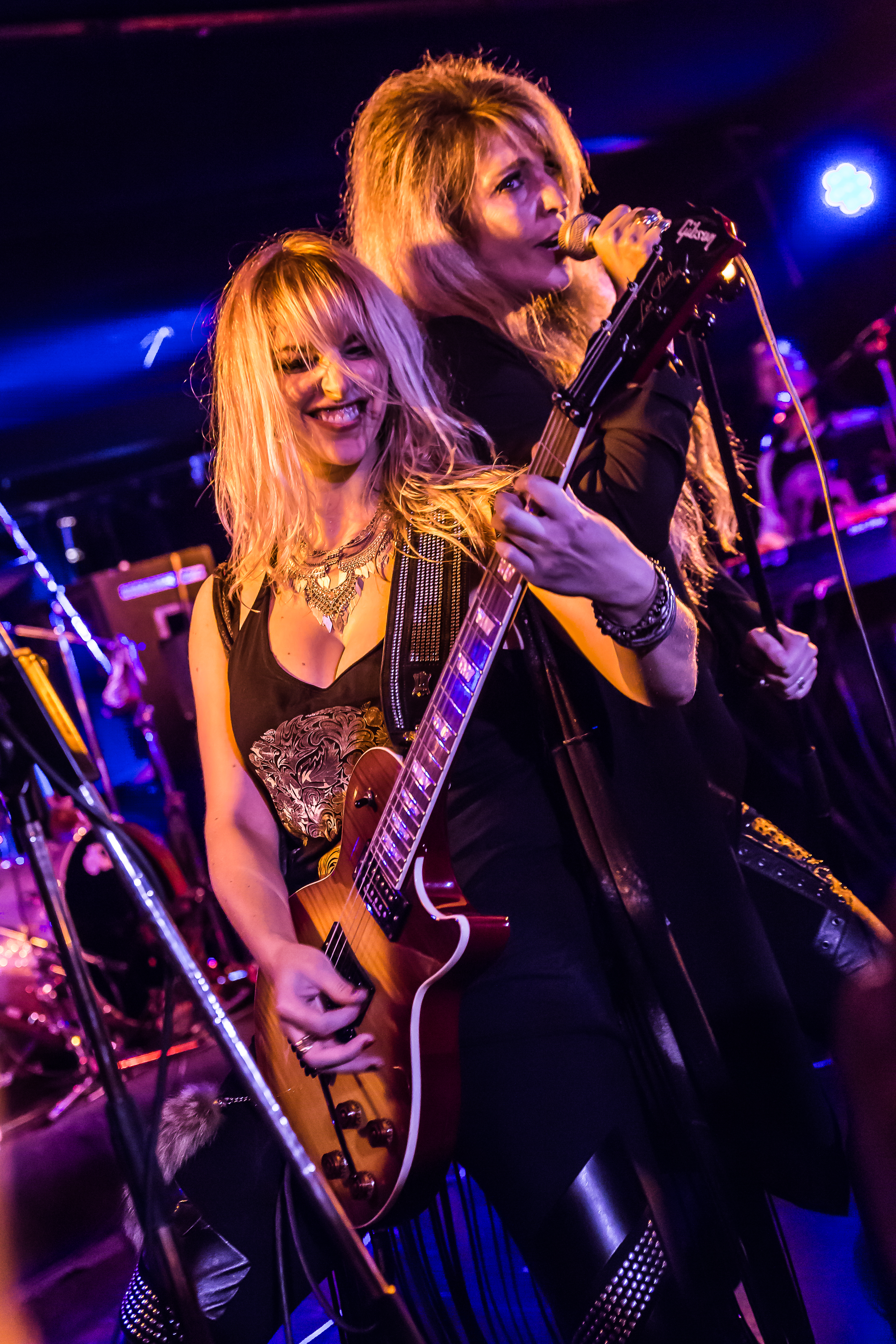
Lead guitarist Britt Lightning and lead vocalist Janet Gardner in Stuttgart, 2018

== Early life ==
Gardner was born in Juneau, Alaska, and her birthday is listed as March 21, 1962. Her father, Rulon B. Gardner, was a civil engineer who worked for the United States Forest Service in Utah, Alaska, and Michigan before taking a job in Bozeman, Montana, at the Forestry Sciences Laboratory at Montana State University in 1964, where Gardner grew up. Her mother, Margaret, was a piano player and church organist. Her parents were of the Latter-day Saint faith. Janet was the only girl in a family with four brothers. She sang in school choirs and learned to play piano and guitar.

== Musical career ==
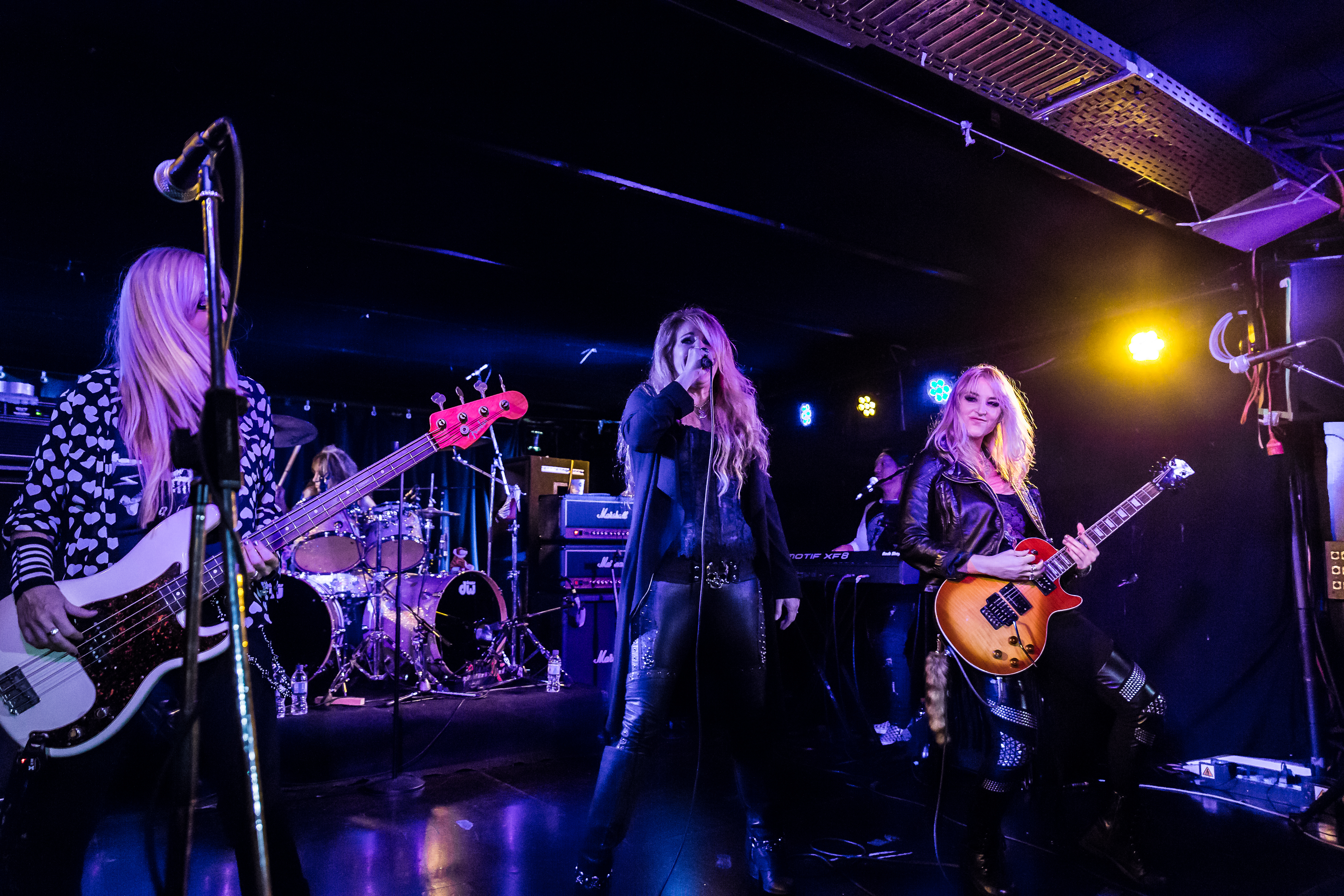
Vixen 2018 (l-r) Share Ross, Roxy Petrucci, Gardner, Britt Lightning

Gardner became the lead singer and rhythm guitarist of the all-woman hard rock band Vixen. She joined the band's early lineup in 1983, when it was a quintet. In 1984, the band appeared in the movie Hardbodies as Diaper Rash before moving to Los Angeles to further their career, playing in the pop rock genre. Gardner at the time was on lead vocals only. After some initial changes, the primary lineup of Vixen consisted of Gardner, doubling as the second guitarist, Jan Kuehnemund, Roxy Petrucci, and Share Ross, then known as Share Pedersen. Vixen signed with EMI's Manhattan Records and recorded their self-titled debut album which was released in September 1988. Gardner described the pressure of recording as "We were just girls from Minnesota and Montana who loved playing live, so it was a bit of a rude awakening."

Their lead single "Edge of a Broken Heart" became their signature hit song. It was co-written, arranged, and produced by Richard Marx. Vixen would go on worldwide tours in support of Ozzy Osbourne, Scorpions, and Bon Jovi along with their own headline shows. Vixen recorded and released their second album Rev It Up in July 1990. They toured for another year alongside Kiss and Deep Purple before the band split up in 1992 citing musical differences.

In 1997, Gardner and Petrucci reformed Vixen with Rana Ross and Gina Stile for a US tour. In 1998, they recorded a third Vixen album titled Tangerine without Ross. The album would be a shift in styles going to a more late-90s post-grunge sound rather than the 80s hair metal sound of the previous two albums. Tangerine eventually became the last studio album for Gardner during her tenure with Vixen. Roxy Petrucci's sister Maxine joined the group as bassist for a tour until they were sued by original member Jan Kuehnemund over trademark infringement involving the use of the Vixen name.

In 2001, Kuehnemund decided to reform the band this time with Gardner and Petrucci, adding Pat Holloway on bass. The newly reformed Vixen toured the United States as part of the Voices of Metal tour until disagreements with management once again caused the band to split in the middle of the tour. Kuehnemund quickly replaced the band with three new members to finish the tour and they continued under the Vixen name.

VH1 contacted the original Vixen lineup in 2004 and got them to appear on the show Bands Reunited. The show featured a one-time reunion of the original group that aired in November 2004 coinciding with the re-release of the first two Vixen albums.

Gardner mostly stayed out of the spotlight until making a few special appearances singing with the band Scrap Metal in 2010 and 2011. In 2012, Share Ross and Roxy Petrucci, along with Gardner, contacted Jan Kuehnemund about reuniting the original Vixen, however Kuehnemund declined stating that she was happy with her new band. Soon after, it was announced that Gardner, Ross, and Petrucci would form their own band along with Gina Stile. They originally named the band "VXN" but decided to change it to avoid any possible lawsuits, thus they became known as simply JanetShareRoxyGina (or JSRG for short).

JSRG began playing shows at the end of 2012, followed by touring on the Monsters of Rock cruise in March 2013. After a long battle with cancer, Kuehnemund died on October 10, 2013. Consequently, in December, JSRG decided to carry on as Vixen to honor Kuehnemund's legacy.

Gardner released a self-titled solo album, co-produced and written by her and her husband, Justin James, on Pavement Entertainment on August 18, 2017. In addition to vocals, she tripled as a bass guitarist and a drummer on her album, according to an interview with James, who handled guitar duties. So, only the couple served as personnel on Janet Gardner.

In late May 2018, after recovery from surgery for a subdural hematoma, Gardner toured the United Kingdom. Earlier in March, she was substituted by Femme Fatale's Lorraine Lewis during a show in Oklahoma.

On January 16, 2019, Gardner confirmed in a Facebook post her resignation from Vixen to devote more time to family and prioritize her budding role as a solo artist. Her last appearance with the band was at the Mohegan Sun Casino Wolf Den in Uncasville, Connecticut, during the previous November. Her final contribution on lead vocals was when the band recorded two studio tracks, their own cover of Ray Kennedy's "You Oughta Know by Now," titled "You Ought to Know by Now" and an acoustic version of "Edge of a Broken Heart" for the 2018 live album Live Fire. The first song was originally on his 1980 self-titled album. Her former bandmates eventually named Lewis as her successor. Gardner recorded her second album Your Place in the Sun with James. It was released on May 31, 2019.

Gardner and James released Synergy in May 2020 under the different band name Gardner/James which confirmed her eponymous solo project was officially considered a duo.

== Personal life ==
Sometime after Gardner was asked to leave Vixen during the tension-marred 2001 tour, she attended the University of Bridgeport and, from there, graduated with a degree in dental hygiene, becoming a dental hygienist in 2005. For almost 15 years she maintained a license that expired on March 31, 2020, and worked as a hygienist when not working on musical projects. Previously, during her former band's heydays in Los Angeles, Gardner worked at a golf course pro shop.

Gardner has been married to guitarist Justin James since 2016. She has a son from her previous marriage to Andy Katz, an engineer whom she met during the recording of Tangerine. Gardner is also the stepmother to James's two children. She shares the same birthday with her former Vixen bandmate Roxy Petrucci. Gardner and James released their 4th CD together No Strings on Frontiers Music in June 2023.

== Gardner/James Band ==
- Janet Gardner – lead vocals, guitars, bass, drums (2017–)
- Justin James – guitars, bass, drums, backing vocals (2017–)

== Discography ==
Vixen

- Vixen (1988)
- Rev It Up (1990)
- Tangerine (1998)
- Rare Vintage (2018)
- Live Fire (2018)

Solo album

- Janet Gardner (2017)
- Your Place in the Sun (2019)

Gardner/James

- Synergy (2020)
- No Strings (2023)

== Filmography ==
Video

- Vixen - Revved Up! (1990)
- MTV Unplugged (1990)
  - played "Edge of a Broken Heart" and "Love Is a Killer"

Films

- Hardbodies (1984) as the band "Diaper Rash" (Janet Gardner, Jan Kuehnemund, Tamara Ivanov, Pia Maiocco, Laurie Hedlund)
- The Decline of Western Civilization Part II: The Metal Years (1988) (Cameo interviews with Janet Gardner, Share Pedersen and Roxy Petrucci)
