= Levellers discography =

- Studio albums: 13
- Live albums: 3
- Compilation albums: 4
- Singles: 34

The discography of the Levellers, a British rock band, consists of 13 studio albums, three live albums, four compilation albums and 34 singles.

== Albums ==
=== Studio albums ===
List of studio albums, with selected details, chart positions and certifications
Title	Details	Peak chart positions				Certifications
Title	Details	UK	BEL	NLD	SWE	Certifications
A Weapon Called the Word	Released: April 1990; Label: Musidisc; Format: CD, CD+DVD-V, CS, DL, LP	—	—	—	—	BPI: Gold
Levelling the Land	Released: 7 October 1991; Label: China; Format: CD, CD+DVD-V, CS, DL, LP	14	129	—	—	BPI: Gold
Levellers	Released: 23 August 1993; Label: China; Format: CD, CS, DL, LP	2	—	50	13	BPI: Gold
Zeitgeist	Released: 28 August 1995; Label: China; Format: CD, CS, DL, LP	1	7	46	5	BPI: Gold
Mouth to Mouth	Released: 25 August 1997; Label: China; Format: CD, CS, DL, LP	5	14	43	48	BPI: Gold
Hello Pig	Released: 4 September 2000; Label: China; Format: CD, CS, DL, LP	28	—	—	—	
Green Blade Rising	Released: 23 September 2002; Label: Eagle; Format: CD, DL, LP	77	—	—	—	
Truth and Lies	Released: 23 May 2005; Label: Eagle; Format: CD, DL	102	—	—	—	
Letters from the Underground	Released: 11 August 2008; Label: On the Fiddle; Format: CD, DL, LP	24	86	—	—	
Static on the Airwaves	Released: 25 June 2012; Label: On the Fiddle; Format: CD, CD+DVD-V, DL, LP	36	126	—	—	
We the Collective	Released: 30 March 2018; Label: On the Fiddle; Format: CD, DL, LP	12	—	—	—	
Peace	Released: 14 August 2020; Label: On the Fiddle; Format: CD, DL, LP	8	—	—	—	
Together All the Way	Released: 2023; Label: On the Fiddle; Format: CD, DL, LP	21	—	—	—	
"—" denotes a recording that did not chart or was not released in that territory.

==== Re-issues ====
All of the following were remastered with new artwork and released 16 July 2007:

- Levelling the Land (2 disc, with BBC's recording of Glastonbury 1992)
- Levellers (with additional tracks)
- Zeitgeist (with additional tracks)
- Mouth to Mouth (with additional tracks)
- Hello Pig (with unreleased tracks)
- A Weapon Called the Word (re-mastered) On the Fiddle Recordings, 2010
- Levelling the Land (box set inc. 2×LP, 2×CD, DVD) On the Fiddle Recordings, 2016

=== Live albums ===
List of live albums, with selected details and chart positions
Title	Details	Peak chart positions		
Title	Details	UK	BEL	SWE
Headlights, White Lines, Black Tar Rivers (Best Live)	Released: 1996; Label: China	13	41	48
Live at the Royal Albert Hall	Released: 2009; Label: On the Fiddle	—	—	—
Levelling the Land Live	Released: 2011; Label: On the Fiddle	—	—	—
The Lockdown Sessions	Released: 2021; Label: On the Fiddle	—	—	—
Live at Hackney Empire	Released: 2024; Label: On the Fiddle	—	—	—
"—" denotes a recording that did not chart or was not released in that territory.

=== Compilation albums ===
List of compilation albums, with selected details, chart positions and certifications
Title	Details	Peak chart positions	Certifications
Title	Details	UK	Certifications
See Nothing, Hear Nothing, Do Something: UK Singles and Live Collection	Released: 1992	—	
One Way of Life: Best of the Levellers	Released: 1998; Label: China	15	BPI: Gold
Special Brew	Released: 2001	—	
Greatest Hits	Released: 2014; Label: On the Fiddle	32	
"—" denotes a recording that did not chart or was not released in that territory.

=== Video albums ===
List of video albums, with selected details
Title	Details
The Great Video Swindle	Released: November 1992; Label: Chrysalis/China (CHV10537); Format: VHS
Best Live: Headlights, White Lines and Black Tar Rivers	Released: August 1996; Label: China (063016303); Format: VHS
One Way of Life: The Best of The Levellers	Released: October 1998; Label: China (3984 25457); Format: VHS
Chaos Theory	Released: October 2006; Label: On the Fiddle (OTFDVD001); Format: DVD-V
Levelling the Land Live	Released: 2011; Label: On the Fiddle (OTFDVD002); Format: DVD-V

== Singles ==
List of singles, with selected chart positions, showing year released and album name
Title	Year	Peak chart positions	Album
Title	Year	UK	Album
"Carry Me"	1989	—	Non-album singles
"Outside/Inside"	1989	—	Non-album singles
"World Freak Show"	1990	—	A Weapon Called the Word
"Together All the Way"	1990	—	A Weapon Called the Word
"One Way"	1991	51	Levelling the Land
"Far from Home"	1991	71	Levelling the Land
"Fifteen Years"	1992	11	Non-album single
"Belaruse"	1993	12	Levellers
"This Garden"	1993	12	Levellers
"Julie"	1994	17	Levellers
"Hope St."	1995	12	Zeitgeist
"Fantasy"	1995	16	Zeitgeist
"Just the One"	1995	12	Zeitgeist
"Exodus" (live)	1996	24	Headlights, White Lines, Black Tar Rivers (Best Live)
"What a Beautiful Day"	1997	13	Mouth to Mouth
"Celebrate"	1997	28	Mouth to Mouth
"Dog Train"	1997	24	Mouth to Mouth
"Too Real"	1998	46	Mouth to Mouth
"Bozos"	1998	44	Non-album single
"One Way '98"	1999	33	One Way of Life: The Best of the Levellers
"Happy Birthday Revolution"	2000	57	Hello Pig
"Come On"	2002	44	Green Blade Rising
"Wild as Angels"	2003	34	Green Blade Rising
"Make You Happy"	2005	38	Truth & Lies
"Last Man Alive"	2005	147	Truth & Lies
"Beautiful Day" (reissue)	2007	—	Non-album single
"A Life Less Ordinary" / "The Cholera Well"	2008	—	Letters from the Underground
"Burn America Burn"	2008	—	Letters from the Underground
"Before the End"	2008	—	Letters from the Underground
"Truth Is"	2012	—	Static on the Airwaves
"After the Hurricane"	2012	—	Static on the Airwaves
"We Are All Gunmen"	2012	—	Static on the Airwaves
"The Recruiting Sergeant"	2013	—	Static on the Airwaves
"Carry Me" (reissue)	2014	—	Non-album single
"—" denotes a recording that did not chart or was not released in that territory.
