= Matt Savage (British musician) =

English former actor and musician (born 1972)

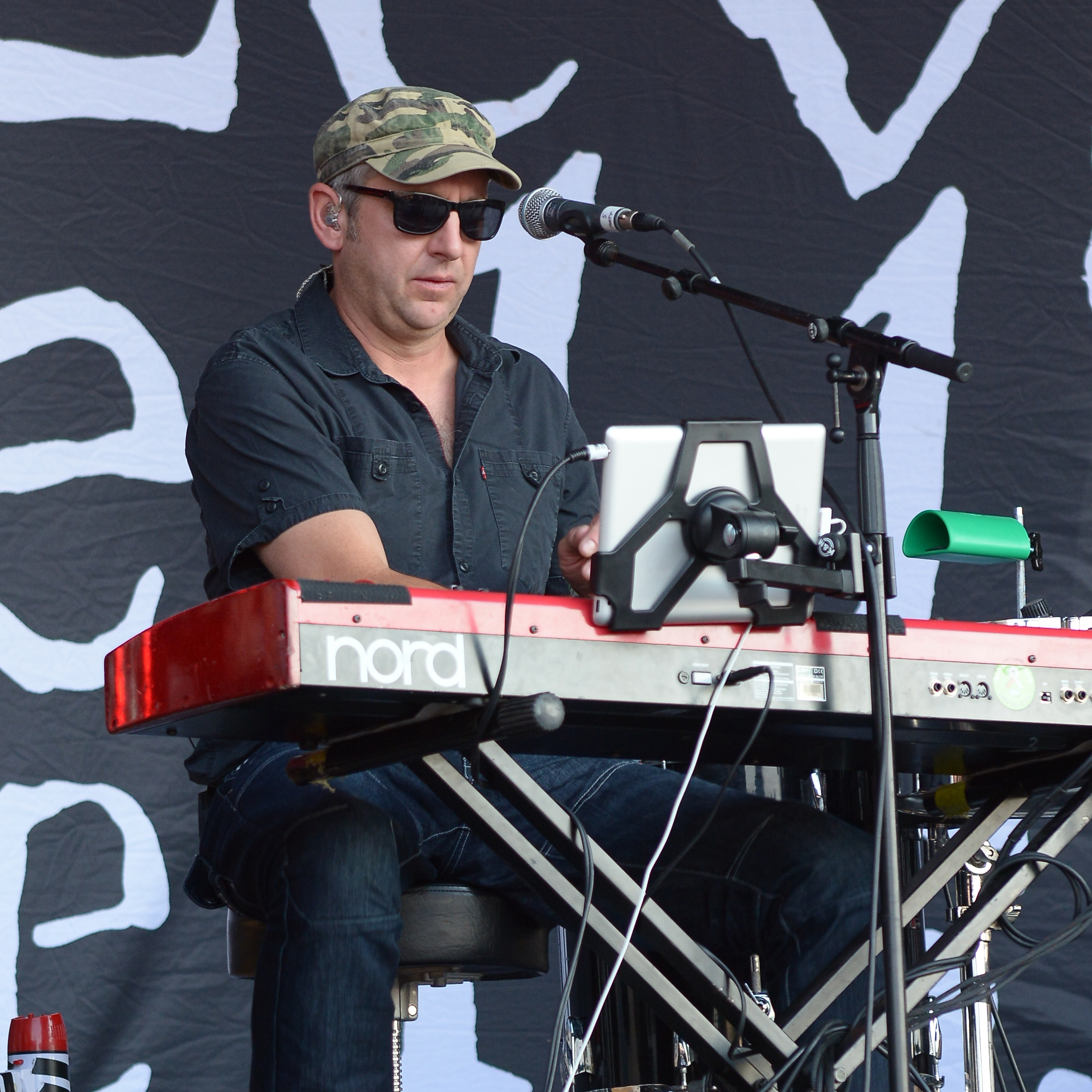
- Savage when Levellers in 2015
- Born: Matthew James Savage; 23 August 1972 (age 53); Reading, Berkshire, England
- Occupations: Former actor, musician
- Years active: 1981–present
- Known for: Levellers (2003–present)
- Notable work: Levellers discography
- Television: Birds of a Feather (1990–1998)
- Children: 2

Matthew James Savage (born 23 August 1972) is a British musician and former actor. He is best known for his role of Garth Stubbs in the BBC One sitcom Birds of a Feather (1990–1998). He has been a member of the folk rock and anarcho-punk band Levellers since 2003.

== Early life ==
Matthew James Savage was born in Reading, Berkshire, England on 23 August 1972, as the eldest child to David James "Dave" Savage (born 1948), an independent financial advisor, and his wife, Catherine Mary "Cathie" (née Dickens; born 1949). He has two brothers, Robin Paul "Rob" Savage (born 1974) and Peter David Savage (born 1978).

== Career ==
Savage started his career as a child actor at the age of nine, as the Artful Dodger in Oliver!, with his father's production company, Generation (later Starmaker). He worked as a waiter at a local TGI Fridays. He played a Cabin Boy in the West End musical Mutiny, at the age of 13, alongside David Essex.

Savage made his film debut with the role of Christopher Marsden in the Australian adventure film Burke & Wills, directed by Graeme Clifford, and starring Jack Thompson as Robert O'Hara Burke and Nigel Havers as William John Wills. The film, a serious drama, was based on the Burke and Wills expedition and was released in Australia on 31 October 1985, a week after the release of the similarly themed black comedy film Wills & Burke.

Savage portrayed Wiggins in the comedy film Without a Clue, directed by Thom Eberhardt, and starring Michael Caine as Sherlock Holmes/Reginald Kincaid and Ben Kingsley as Dr. John Watson. The film is based on Sir Arthur Conan Doyle's characters from the Sherlock Holmes stories, but, in this version, the roles are reversed. Dr. John Watson is the brilliant detective, while "Sherlock Holmes" is an actor hired to pose as the detective so that Watson can protect his reputation as a physician. The film was released on 21 October 1988.

Savage made his television debut with the role of George Harvey in the fourth episode during the fifth series of the BBC Two anthology drama series Screen Two. The episode, "Words of Love", was broadcast on 29 January 1989.

Savage rose to prominence when he took over the role of Garth Stubbs—the son of Tracey Stubbs (Linda Robson) and Darryl (Alun Lewis/Douglas McFerran), and the nephew of Sharon Theodopolopodous (Pauline Quirke)—in the BBC One sitcom Birds of a Feather. He was the second actor to play the character, who had previously been portrayed by Simon Nash. He made his debut appearance, in a guest capacity, in the third episode during the second series, "Young Guns", which was broadcast on 20 September 1990. He was promoted to the recurring cast, appearing in three episodes of the third series, six episodes of the fourth series, five episodes of the fifth series, five episodes of the sixth series, seven episodes of the seventh series, three episodes of the eighth series, and two episodes of the ninth series, making his final appearance in the 100th episode, "Nuptials", which was broadcast on 14 December 1998.

Savage founded the band Metro in 1995. He performed as a singer and a guitar player.

Savage announced his retirement as an actor on 24 December 1998. He, in character as Garth Stubbs, was featured on the 1999 Christmas special of the BBC One blooper show, Auntie's Bloomers, hosted by Terry Wogan. The episode, "Auntie's Cracking New Bloopers", was broadcast that Christmas Day.

Savage joined the folk rock and anarcho-punk band Levellers as the keyboard player in 2003. He also provides backing vocals. Self-described as having "a left-wing view of politics", the band took their name after the 17th-century Levellers political movement. This was speculated for many years, but confirmed in October 2014 by band member Jeremy "Jez" Cunnningham. The band founded their own festival, Beautiful Days, in 2003. The festival is now an annual event, taking place each August at Escot Park, near Fairmile in Devon, England.

== Personal life ==
Savage has lived in Brighton, East Sussex since 2000. He has a son, Leon, and a daughter, Poppy, born on 20 January 2009.

== Filmography ==
=== Film ===
Year	Title	Role	Notes	Ref.
1985	Burke & Wills	Christopher Marsden		
1988	Without a Clue	Wiggins		

=== Television ===
Year	Title	Role	Notes	Ref.
1989	Screen Two	George Harvey	Episode: "Words of Love"	
1990–1998	Birds of a Feather	Garth Stubbs	32 episodes	
1999	Auntie's Bloomers	Garth	Episode: "Auntie's Cracking New Bloomers"	

== Discography ==
- Green Blade Rising (2002)
- Truth and Lies (2005)
- Letters from the Underground (2008)
- Static on the Airwaves (2012)
- We the Collective (2018)
- Peace (2020)
- Together All the Way (2023)
