= Billy Two Rivers =

Canadian wrestler (1935–2023)

Billy Two Rivers Kaientaronkwen
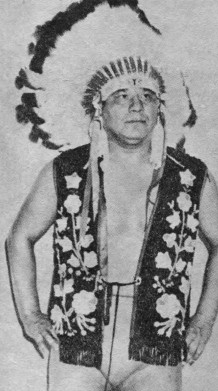
- Two Rivers, c. 1972

Personal information
- Born: May 5, 1935 Kahnawake Mohawk Territory, Quebec, Canada
- Died: February 12, 2023 (aged 87) Kahnawake Mohawk Territory, Quebec, Canada
- Children: Wayne Hemingway

Professional wrestling career
- Ring name: Billy Two Rivers
- Billed height: 6 ft 0 in (1.83 m)
- Billed weight: 220 lb (100 kg; 15 st 10 lb)
- Trained by: Don Eagle
- Debut: February 1953
- Retired: 1977

Billy Two Rivers (Mohawk name Kaientaronkwen, May 5, 1935 – February 12, 2023) was a Canadian Mohawk professional wrestler, actor, and a leader of the Mohawks of Kahnawà:ke.

He began wrestling professionally in 1953 and retired in 1977, having worked in the United States, United Kingdom, Japan and Canada. In 1978, he became leader of the Kahnawake First Nations reserve, and played a major role in blockading the Honoré Mercier Bridge during the 1990 Oka Crisis.

== Early life ==
Two Rivers was born on May 5, 1935 in Kahnawake, a Mohawk First Nations reserve located near Montreal, Quebec. He grew up in Kahnawake speaking the Mohawk language at home and learned English in school, which was only available until eighth grade.

== Wrestling career ==
=== 1950s ===
Two Rivers was trained by Don Eagle, a former World Heavyweight Champion in the Boston-based American Wrestling Association. When he, also from Kahnawake, returned to the reservation on a break from wrestling, he met 16-year-old Two Rivers, became his guardian and took him to Columbus, Ohio, for training. This lasted two years, during which time he increased his weight to 205 pounds from 185.

Two Rivers made his professional debut in February 1953 in Detroit, facing Rose Martino of Italy. He spent the next several years in the United States, first in Ohio and then throughout the Atlantic Coast. He worked against such wrestlers as "Wild Bull" Curry and Larry Hamilton. He also formed a tag team with Don Eagle from 1956 to 1959. As a team, they faced a wide variety of opponents, including Ray Stevens, Boris Malenko, and Fritz Von Erich. From 1957 to 1959, he wrestled primarily in North Carolina, also teaming with Antonino Rocca and Red Bastien.

With George Becker, Two Rivers held his first championship belt. On April 6, 1959, they won the Southern version of the NWA Southern Tag Team Championship by defeating Alberto and Enrique Torres. They held the title for three months before dropping them to the team of Mr. Moto and Duke Keomuka. After losing the championship, Two Rivers considered moving to Calgary, Alberta, to work for Stampede Wrestling. Ray Napolitano, a wrestler from the United Kingdom, told him to consider moving overseas. He flipped a coin to decide and it chose the UK, where he began working in October 1959.

=== 1960s ===
Wrestling in England and Scotland, Two Rivers gained fame due to his First Nations heritage. He wore a feathered headdress, had a Mohawk hairstyle, and performed a war dance during some of his matches. He has stated that he was a "journeyman" wrestler rather than a major star, and that people wanted to see him because he was "an attraction". In the UK, Paul LeDuc said he was "treated like a god".

Two Rivers returned to the United States in September 1965 and resumed wrestling in North Carolina. After six months, which included teaming with Karl Gotch to defeat the Blond Bombers (Rip Hawk and Swede Hanson), he left for Japan until at least May 13, 1966, after which point there is no record of him wrestling again until 1971.

=== 1970s ===
In 1971 and 1972, Two Rivers had several matches in Ontario and Quebec, often as part of a tag team with Johnny War Eagle. The following year, he returned to the United Kingdom, where he stayed to wrestle until late in 1974. At that point, he wrestled several matches in Germany before returning to Canada. He returned because his family asked him to spend more time at home. In the Montreal-based Grand Prix Wrestling (GPW), he held the GPW Tag Team Championship while teaming with Jean War Eagle in 1974. He remained in Canada, facing such wrestlers as Sailor White, The Sheik, and Kurt Von Hess, for the rest of his career. His final title victory came on August 3, 1976, when he defeated Serge Dumont to win the Canadian International Heavyweight Championship. He retired in 1977, and has stated that one of the best parts of his career was "ending my career healthy".

He served as the curator of the Professional Wrestling Hall of Fame and Museum section for First Nations wrestlers, "War Chiefs of the Mat".

== Political life ==
After retiring from wrestling, Two Rivers became involved in the governance of the Kahnawake reservation, serving as an elder, chief, and councillor.

In 1990, Two Rivers helped lead the Mohawk nation during the Oka Crisis. A golf course in the village of Oka, Quebec, planned to expand onto land claimed by the Mohawk as traditional land. The Mohawk people objected to the plan to cut down a sacred grove of pines and build on their burial ground. During the dispute, the First Nations group blockaded a bridge, and a member of the Sûreté du Québec was killed.

On his death in 2023, the Mohawk Council of Kahnawake described Two Rivers as "hugely influential" during the 1990 crisis as the right-hand man to Grand Chief Joseph Norton.

== Acting ==
Two Rivers appeared in several films, including Pocahontas: The Legend, Black Robe, and Taking Lives. He is in the 1973 documentary The Wrestling Queen, and the made-for-television movies Red Earth, White Earth and Northern Passage.

== Personal life ==
Two Rivers was the father of British fashion designer Wayne Hemingway.

=== Death ===
Two Rivers died in Kahnawake on February 12, 2023, at the age of 87.

== In popular culture ==
Two Rivers' name has entered popular culture in many forms. A British racing horse shared it. The British band The Dogs D'Amour named a song after him on its In the Dynamite Jet Saloon album in 1988. He plays a large role in Pulitzer Prize-winner Paul Muldoon's poem "My Father and I and Billy Two Rivers". The poem discusses watching him in a wrestling match and compares the predetermined outcome to the Boston Tea Party.

After learning a photograph of him was to be featured on the cover of Van Morrison's September 2017 album Roll with the Punches, Two Rivers sued the singer and his label, Universal Music Group, in July, claiming they did not seek permission to use his likeness. On August 4, his lawyer announced the parties had agreed in principle to settle out of court, and were negotiating details toward dismissing the now-suspended suit.

== Wrestling championships and accomplishments ==
- Grand Prix Wrestling
  - GPW Tag Team Championship (1 time)
- Lutte Internationale
  - Canadian International Heavyweight Championship (1 time)
- Mid-Atlantic Championship Wrestling
  - NWA Southern Tag Team Championship (Mid-Atlantic version) (1 time)

== Filmography ==
=== Film ===
- Black Robe (1991) - Ougebmat (also Mohawk-language translator)
- Pocahontas: The Legend (1995) - Mochiqua
- Bolt (1995, direct-to-video) - Indian
- Musketeers Forever (1998, direct-to-video) - Elder
- Taking Lives (2004) - Car Salesman

=== Television ===
- Red Earth, White Earth (1989, TV movie) - 2nd Indian
- Heritage Minutes (1992, 1 episode) - Chief
- Tales of the Willows (1994, 1 episode) - Broken Foot
- Aztec, Pyramids of War (2009, 2 episodes) - Aztec Scribe
- Mohawk Girls (2015, 1 episode) - Male Elder
