= Errol Flynn (album) =

Studio album by the Dogs D'Amour
- Released: 1989
- Genre: Rock and roll, glam rock
- Length: 49:39
- Label: China
- Producer: Mark Dearnley and the Dogs D'Amour

The Dogs D'Amour chronology
A Graveyard of Empty Bottles (1989)	Errol Flynn (1989)	Straight??!! (1990)

Professional ratings
Review scores
Source	Rating
AllMusic	3/5 stars
Hi-Fi News & Record Review	A:1*

Errol Flynn (known in the United States as King of the Thieves) is rock band the Dogs D'Amour's fourth studio album, and the second they released in 1989. It entered the UK Albums Chart at #22.

The album spawned two singles; "Satellite Kid" and "Trail of Tears" respectively, both reached the UK top 50 on the singles chart. "Satellite Kid" is perhaps the band's best-known song and their highest charting single, reaching #26.

== Critical reception ==
Dave E. Henderson of Music Week ironically assessed Errol Flynn as "poppy rock songs with a modicum of posing" and noticed that for such rebelling rockers "the word "glam" is optional, but the "drinkin' Jack Daniel's habit is a necessity".

== Track listing ==
1. "Drunk Like Me" – 4:12
2. "Goddess from the Gutter" – 3:34
3. "Hurricane" – 3:49
4. "Satellite Kid" – 3:54
5. "Errol Flynn" – 2:28
6. "Planetary Pied Piper" – 4:39
7. "Princess Valium" – 4:17
8. "Dogs Hair" – 2:52
9. "Trail of Tears" – 4:04
10. "Ballad of Jack" – 3:50
11. "The Prettiest Girl in the World" – 2:45
12. "The Girl Behind the Glass" – 3:43
13. "Things Seem to Go Wrong" – 1:51
14. "Baby Glass" – 3:39

== Band ==
- Tyla – vocals, guitar
- Jo "Dog" Almeida – guitars
- Steve James – bass
- Bam – drums

== Singles ==
- "Satellite Kid" (1989) UK #26
- "Trail of Tears" (1989) UK #47
