= On the Fiddle (record label) =

English record label

On the Fiddle Recordings
- Parent company: The Levellers
- Founded: 2006
- Genre: Alternative rock, British folk rock
- Country of origin: United Kingdom
- Location: Brighton

On the Fiddle Recordings is an English record label established by and run by the English folk rock band the Levellers.

== History ==
The label was initially founded by the band in the early 1990s to distribute limited edition albums to their fan-club members. The label went dormant, but was resurrected in 2006 when the band became disillusioned with Eagle Records’ attempt to market their music, and decided to release their music on their own independent label.

The first On the Fiddle release was a live DVD, Chaos Theory, in October 2006 and includes a live show from Reading Hexagon and the 1993 tour diary/concert Part Time Punks. The label released the band's first independent album Letters from the Underground in 2008. Hailed as a ‘return to form’ by critics and fans alike, and the album put the Levellers in the Top 30 for the first time in nearly a decade.

Follow up albums Static On The Airwaves and the Greatest Hits compilation both made the Top 40. The release of We the Collective on 30 March 2018 saw the band receive their highest-charting entry for 21 years when it reached #12, the band's previous best charting album was 1997's Mouth to Mouth which reached #5 when the band was still with China records. The band's latest release Peace which was released on 14 August 2020 entered the charts at #8 continuing this revival in chart success and giving the band their 4th top 10 album.

The label also releases The Levellers frontman Mark Chadwick's solo work.

== Discography ==
=== The Levellers ===
Studio albums

- Letters from the Underground (2008)
- Static on the Airwaves (2012)
- We the Collective (2018)
- Peace (2020)

=== Mark Chadwick ===
- All the Pieces (2010)
- Moment (2014

=== Nick Burbridge ===
- All Kinds of Disorder (2013)
- Gathered (2013)
- Resolved (2017)

=== Dan Donnelly ===
- Are We Having Fun? (2018)
