= Straight??!! =

Studio album by The Dogs D'Amour
- Released: 1990
- Genres: Glam rock, hard rock, Glam punk
- Length: 46:02
- Label: China
- Producer: Ric Browde

The Dogs D'Amour chronology
Errol Flynn (1989)	Straight??!! (1990)	...More Unchartered Heights of Disgrace (1993)

Professional ratings
Review scores
Source	Rating
AllMusic	2.5/5 stars
Select	3/5 medals

Straight??!! is the fifth studio album by English rock band The Dogs D'Amour. Album was released in 1990 and entered the UK Albums Chart at #32.

Notably, this album is the last Dogs D'Amour recording to feature the 'classic' line-up of Tyla, Steve James, Jo Dog and Bam, as the band would break up onstage in 1991. The album spawned three singles; "Victims of Success", "Empty World" and "Back on the Juice", all of which reached the top 100 of the UK Singles Chart, the first of which was a Top 40 hit.

== Track listing ==
All songs written by Tyla, except where noted.

1. "Cardboard Town" - 3:14
2. "Kiss My Heart Goodbye" 4:15
3. "Lie in This Land" - 3:08
4. "You Can't Burn the Devil" - 3:23
5. "No Gypsy Blood" - 2:22
6. "Empty World" - 2:29
7. "Back on the Juice" - 3:52
8. "Evil" - 3:26
9. "Victims of Success" - 3:10
10. "Flyin' Solo" - 4:13
11. "Heroine" - 4:43
12. "Chiva" - 5:00
13. "Lady Nicotine" - 2:52

Japanese CD bonus tracks

14. "I Don't Want You to Go" (live bonus) - 5:39
15. "Ballad of Jack" (live bonus) (Tyla/Ross) - 3:49

== Band ==
- Tyla - vocals, guitar
- Jo "Dog" Almeida - guitars
- Steve James - bass
- Bam - drums

== Singles ==
- "Victims of Success" (1990) UK #36
- "Empty World" (1990) UK #61
- "Back on the Juice" (1990) UK #97
