= A Graveyard of Empty Bottles =

EP by The Dogs D'Amour
- Released: 1989
- Genre: Hard rock, blues rock
- Label: China
- Producer: Mark Dearnley; The Dogs D'Amour

The Dogs D'Amour chronology
In the Dynamite Jet Saloon (1988)	A Graveyard of Empty Bottles (1989)	Errol Flynn (1989)

Professional ratings
Review scores
Source	Rating
Hi-Fi News & Record Review	A:1*
New Musical Express	7/10

A Graveyard of Empty Bottles is a standalone EP by The Dogs D'Amour, released in 1989. Despite being an EP, it was the first of the band's releases to enter the UK Albums Chart top 100, reaching #16. It was the Dogs D'Amour's highest ever charting release.

The album was also released in a limited edition 10" numbered vinyl format.

== Track listing ==
1. "I Think It's Love Again"
2. "So Once Was I"
3. "Comfort of the Devil"
4. "Saviour"
5. "Errol Flynn"
6. "Bullet Proof Poet"
7. "When the Dream Has Gone"
8. "Angel (So You Shall Be)"

== Band ==
- Tyla – vocals, guitar
- Jo "Dog" Almeida – guitars
- Steve James – bass
- Bam – drums
