= ...More Unchartered Heights of Disgrace =

Studio album by The Dogs D'Amour
- Released: 1993
- Genre: Rock
- Length: 44:22
- Label: China
- Producers: Al Scott; The Dogs D'Amour

The Dogs D'Amour chronology
Straight??!! (1990)	...More Unchartered Heights of Disgrace (1993)	Happy Ever After (2000)

...More Unchartered Heights of Disgrace is the sixth studio album by rock band The Dogs D'Amour, released in 1993 following the band's reformation. Guitarist Darrell Bath, who would later become the lead guitarist for Ian Hunter, plays on this album in place of Jo Almeida, who later rejoined. It entered the UK Albums Chart at #30.

The album spawned two singles: "Pretty, Pretty Once" and a cover of the Small Faces track "All or Nothing", the latter of which reached #53 on the UK Singles Chart. The track "Johnny Silvers" is about guitarist Johnny Thunders, who died a couple of years prior to its release. The Dogs D'Amour had previously supported him on tour.

After the release of this album, the band decided to pursue other artistic avenues. No further album with the Dogs D'Amour name on it would be released for another seven years.

== Track listing ==
All songs written by Tyla, except where noted.

1. "What's Happening Here?" - 3:38
2. "What You Do" - 2:55
3. "Pretty, Pretty Once" - 4:08
4. "World's Different Now (An Ode to Drug Hill)" (lyrics: Tyla, music: Twinch, Bam, Bath, James) - 3:34
5. "Mr. Addiction" - 3:11
6. "Johnny Silvers" - 5:49
7. "Cath" - 4:06
8. "More Unchartered Heights of Disgrace" (Tyla, Bath) - 3:53
9. "Scared of Dying" - 4:42
10. "Mr. Barfly" - 4:19
11. "Put It in Her Arm" (lyrics: Tyla, music: Bam, Bath, James) - 4:07

Japanese edition bonus tracks

12. "All or Nothing" (Small Faces cover) - 3:39
13. "English Outlaw" - 3:55
14. "No Gypsy Blood" - 2:17

== Band ==
- Tyla – vocals, guitars
- Steve James – bass, 12-string, backing vocals
- Bam – drums, percussion
- Darrell Bath – guitars, slide, backing vocals

Additional musicians

- Henry Twinch – hammond organ, piano and string arrangements
- Ruby Turner – backing vocals on "Pretty, Pretty Once" and "Mr. Addiction"
- Linda Duggan;– backing vocals on "Pretty, Pretty Once", "Mr. Addiction" and "Scared of Dying"

== Singles ==
- All or Nothing (1993) UK #53
- Pretty, Pretty Once (1993)
