= Matt Savage =

Matt Savage may refer to:

- Matt Savage (American musician)
- Matt Savage (British musician)
- Matt Savage (poker director)
