= One Way of Life =

One Way of Life: Best of the Levellers

Compilation album by Levellers
- Released: 26 October 1998
- Genre: Rock, alternative rock, folk punk
- Length: 61:21
- Label: China

Levellers chronology
Mouth to Mouth (1997)	One Way of Life: Best of the Levellers (1998)	Hello Pig (2000)

Professional ratings
Review scores
Source	Rating
Allmusic	link

One Way of Life is a "Best of" compilation by the Levellers, released in 1998 on China Records.

== Track listing ==
1. "One Way" (New Version)
2. "What a Beautiful Day"
3. "Fifteen Years"
4. "Shadow on the Sun"
5. "Hope St." (New Mix)
6. "Belaruse" (New Mix)
7. "Celebrate"
8. "Too Real" (Single Version, 12")
9. "Bozos"
10. "This Garden" (Single Version)
11. "Carry Me" (New Version)
12. "Fantasy"
13. "Julie" (Single Version)
14. "Dog Train" (Single Version)
15. "Far From Home" (Single Version)
16. "Just the One" (Single Version)

== Personnel ==
=== Musicians ===
- Mark Chadwick - guitars, vocals
- Charlie Heather - drums/percussion
- Jeremy Cunningham - bass guitar, artwork
- Simon Friend - guitars, vocals, mandolin
- Jonathan Sevink - fiddle
