= Loud (British band) =

English band

- Origin: Bradford, England
- Genre: Hard rock
- Years active: 1989–1993
- Label: China Records
- Past members: Chris McLaughlin; Martin Hawthorn; Colin Clarkson; Ricky Howard; Stuart Morrow; Paul "Etch" Etchells; Craig Shepherd

Loud were a hard rock band with alternative rock, gothic rock and heavy metal influences, formed in Bradford, England in 1989.

The band was founded by guitarist Chris McLaughlin, following his stint as a live guitarist with New Model Army, and former Excalibur / P.A.D.D. / Hardware bassist Martin Hawthorn. Second guitarist Colin Clarkson and drummer Ricky Howard (formerly of Happiness A.D.) completed the line-up.

== History ==
The group's debut album, released in 1990 on China Records, was called D Generation. It was co-produced by J. Martin Rex and Jaz Coleman of Killing Joke. Kerrang! magazine voted it one of their twenty best albums of 1990.

The band subsequently went out on the road in late 1990, playing some live dates as support to former Duran Duran guitarist Andy Taylor. These were followed by support slots with Killing Joke at the London Astoria on 31 January 1991 and The Godfathers at the Town & Country Club on 21 March 1991, and by their own headline tour of the UK during the Spring.

In July 1991, the band played at the second annual Cumbria Rock Festival at Derwent Park stadium in Workington.

Hawthorn and Clarkson left the band in late 1991 and were replaced by bassist Stuart Morrow (formerly of New Model Army) and guitarist Paul "Etch" Etchells (formerly of Ghost Dance). This revamped line-up recorded the band's second album, Psyche 21, which was released in 1992. The album was produced by Reinhold Mack. It received some favourable write-ups in the contemporary music press, including a rave review from journalist Valerie Potter in the Australian Hot Metal magazine and a 5-out-of-5 score in Metal Hammer magazine from reviewer Anthony Noguera. In spite of the album's success, the band split up shortly afterwards.

== Former members ==
- Chris McLaughlin – Guitar / Vocals (1989–1993)
- Martin Hawthorn – Bass (1989–1991)
- Colin Clarkson – Guitar (1989–1991)
- Ricky Howard – Drums (1989–1993)
- Stuart Morrow – Bass (1991–1993)
- Paul "Etch" Etchells – Guitar (1991–1992)
- Craig Shepherd – Guitar (1992–1993)

== Discography ==
=== Albums ===
- D Generation (1990)
- Psyche 21 (1992)

=== EPs and singles ===
- "D Generation" / "This Time" / "Geist" (1990)
- "Explosive" (remixed by Andy Taylor) / "To Have and to Hold" / "Black Hysteria" (acoustic version) (1990)
- "Song for the Lonely" / "Geist II" / "Massacre" (1991)
- Sex EP – "D Generation" / "Day Tripper" / "God is Dead" / "Resurrection" (1991)
- "God is Dead" (1991) – one track on 7-inch flexi-disc, given away with Kerrang! magazine issue No. 329
- "Easy" (single cut) / "Give Me the Money" / "Late September" (1991) - UK No. 67
- "Easy" (club cut) / "Geist III" / "Psyche 21" (1991) – limited edition 10-inch vinyl picture-disc
- "Mary (She Made Me...)" / "No Pleasure" / "It Wasn't Me" (1992) – promo EP
- "Mary (She Made Me...)" / "I Loved to Be Loved (For Freddie)" / "I Am the Idol (live recording)" (1992)

=== Appearances on compilation albums ===
- "God is Dead" – track No. 5 on Ragazzi Bizarre (1991)
- "Mary (She Made Me...)" – track No. 9 on Metal CD Collection 1 (1992)
