= Levellers (album) =

Studio album by Levellers
- Released: 23 August 1993
- Studio: Real World, Box, Wiltshire
- Genre: Folk punk
- Length: 43:24
- Label: China
- Producer: Markus Dravs

Levellers chronology
Levelling the Land (1991)	Levellers (1993)	Zeitgeist (1995)

Singles from Levellers
- 1. "Belaruse" Released: 28 June 1993; 2. "This Garden" Released: 18 October 1993; 3. "Julie EP" Released: 2 May 1994

Professional ratings
Review scores
Source	Rating
AllMusic	3/5 stars
The Encyclopedia of Popular Music	4/5 stars

Levellers is the third full-length release by Brighton-based folk punk band the Levellers. The record charted at number two in the British album charts. It contains the singles "Belaruse," "This Garden," and "Julie."

== Critical reception ==
Trouser Press called Levellers "a harder-rocking, less distinctive and personable album," writing that "the disastrous 'This Garden' slaps didgeridoo onto dance rhythms and an attempted rap vocal."

== Track listing ==
- All band members are given writing credits on all the tracks apart from "Dirty Davey," which is credited to Nick Burbridge (of McDermott's Two Hours), and "The Flowers of the Forest/The Crags of Stirling," which are traditional arrangements. The re-release of the album in 2007 contains a cover of "Subvert" by Zounds and a cover of The Clash's "English Civil War."
1. "Warning" – 5:00
2. "100 Years of Solitude" – 3:58
3. "The Likes of You and I" – 4:50
4. "Is This Art?" – 3:12
5. "Dirty Davey" – 4:29
6. "This Garden" - 5:28
7. "Broken Circles" – 3:15
8. "Julie" (plus "The Flowers of the Forest"/"The Crags of Stirling" instrumentals) – 6:12
9. "The Player" – 4:00
10. "Belaruse" – 3:00

(a short secret track follows "Belaruse")

The 2007 re-issue of the album also contained the bonus tracks:

1. "The Lowlands of Holland"
2. "English Civil War"
3. "Subvert"
4. "Belaruse Return"

== Personnel ==
=== Musicians ===
- Mark Chadwick - guitars, vocals
- Charlie Heather - drums/percussion
- Jeremy Cunningham - bass guitar, artwork
- Simon Friend - guitars, vocals, mandolin
- Jonathan Sevink - fiddle
- Steve Boakes - didgeridoo
- Jem Finer - hurdy-gurdy
- Callum Williams - bagpipes
- The Kick Horns - brass instruments
- Richard Evans - tin whistle
- Jacinda Jones - backing vocals

=== Technical staff ===
- Markus Dravs - production and sound engineering
- Ben Findlay - additional engineering

== Charts ==
=== Weekly charts ===
Weekly chart performance for Levellers
Chart (1993)	Peak position
Dutch Albums (Album Top 100)	50
German Albums (Offizielle Top 100)	55
Swedish Albums (Sverigetopplistan)	13
UK Albums (OCC)	2

=== Year-end charts ===
Year-end chart performance for Levellers
Chart (1993)	Position
UK Albums (OCC)	80
