= Happy Ever After (album) =

Studio album by the Dogs D'Amour
- Released: 2000
- Genre: Rock
- Label: Artful Records
- Producer: The Dogs D'Amour

The Dogs D'Amour chronology
...More Unchartered Heights of Disgrace (1993)	Happy Ever After (2000)	Seconds (2000)

Happy Ever After is rock band the Dogs D'Amour's seventh studio album, it was released in the year 2000 following the band's reformation. Prior to this, the Dogs had not released an album in seven years; it saw Tyla, Bam and Jo Dog reuniting. Also brought in on bass was Bam's wife, Share Ross, formerly Share Pedersen.

The album featured a cover of a cover in the form of "Quick Joey Small". The Dogs D'Amour's version is a cover of the one English punk band Slaughter & The Dogs did in 1972. However, the song was originally written by Joey Levine for the Kasenetz-Katz Singing Orchestral Circus.

== Track listing ==
1. "Get By"
2. "Spooks"
3. "Angelina"
4. "Singin'"
5. "Flying V Girl"
6. "Even Angels"
7. "Quick Joey Small" (Kasenetz-Katz Singing Orchestral Circus cover)
8. "Fool"
9. "Roll Over"
10. "Ever Do Right"
11. "Little Boy You"

== Band ==
- Tyla - vocals, guitars
- Bam Ross - drums, percussion, backing vox
- Jo "Dog" Almeida - guitars, slide, backing vocals
- Share Ross - bass, keys
