= Pocahontas: The Legend =

- DVD cover
- Directed by: Danièle J. Suissa
- Written by: Donald Martin; Danièle J. Suissa
- Produced by: Steve Levitan; Danièle J. Suissa
- Starring: Sandrine Holt; Miles O'Keeffe; Tony Goldwyn
- Cinematography: Richard Leiterman
- Edited by: Brett Sullivan
- Music by: Jack Lenz
- Production company: Protocol Entertainment
- Release date: June 27, 1995
- Running time: 102 minutes
- Country: Canada
- Language: English

Pocahontas: The Legend is a 1995 Canadian drama film that fictionalizes the young life of the historical figure of Chief Powhatan's daughter Pocahontas and her relationship with Captain John Smith. This film, preceding Disney's animation version, was directed by Danièle J. Suissa, and stars Sandrine Holt as the titular heroine. It was entirely shot around Toronto and Six Nations of the Grand River in Ontario, Canada.

This is the third live-action feature film based on the life of Pocahontas and John Smith, the others being Pocahontas and John Smith (1924) and Captain John Smith and Pocahontas (1953). John Rolfe, the second husband of Pocahontas, does not appear in this motion picture.

Two actors in this film have been involved in other Pocahontas-related projects. Gordon Tootoosis previously voiced Kekata the shaman in Disney's Pocahontas film from the same year. Billy Merasty, who acted as Kocoum, would ten years later portray a Kiskiack in The New World.

== Plot ==
In 1607, an English expedition arrives on the shores of the Chesapeake Bay. As John Smith explores the area, he encounters the beautiful Pocahontas. Sir Edwin Wingfield kills a bald eagle, which nearly causes a conflict with Powhatan warrior Kocoum. Opachisco, a Native American guide to the English, informs the men that they have landed in the Powhatan Confederacy. The expedition names their new settlement Fort James.

At the main Powhatan village, Kocoum and his father, Mochiqua, warn others not to trust the Europeans. Pocahontas encourages her father, Chief Powhatan, to trade with them for firearms. He agrees and orders his people to not attack the newcomers. A group of Powhatan men meet with the English, and Captain Newport offers metal goblets as a gift. Kocoum rejects them and demands guns, but Newport will only give such a valuable gift to a chief. The angers Kocoum and the Powhatans abruptly leave.

Wingfield orders his men to pan for gold in the James River, but they come up empty handed. Sickness spreads in the fort, so Smith, Opachisco, and three other men leave to trade for medicine. While they are traveling, Powhatan warriors ambush and kill everyone, except for Smith. Wingfield believes Smith orchestrated the attack so he could "go native" and hoard gold.

Smith is brought to the Powhatan village, beaten, and sentenced to death. During the execution, Pocahontas intervenes and claims him as her captive. As she nurses him back to health, they fall in love. Smith sends Pocahontas’s younger brother, Japazaws, to the fort with a message explaining his whereabouts. The boy is intercepted by Wingfield, who steals the message and then lies to Newport that Japazaws was sent by Smith to steal guns. This convinces Newport to declare Smith a traitor.

When Smith returns to the fort he is arrested. Pocahontas speaks on his behalf and demands his release. When Smith’s stolen letter is found, Newport realizes that he's been deceived. Wingfield is removed from the fort’s governing council, and Smith is freed.

The English deliver firearms and ammunition as a gift to Chief Powhatan. Later on, Mochiqua reveals to the Chief that the box of ammunition is actually filled with rocks. Pocahontas accuses Mochiqua of switching out the ammunition to make the English appear dishonest. As they bicker, the Chief realizes the lure of firearms is dividing his people.

Wingfield and Kocoum take Pocahontas captive, and Japazaws alerts Smith. In the ensuing fight, Smith kills a Powhatan, and Pocahontas shoots Wingfield dead. Kocoum returns to the village and convinces the Chief to go to war. Pocahontas challenges Kocoum to a trial by fire to prove that she is truthful. He loses the contest and is executed. The Chief calls off the war, but still wants Smith killed. Pocahontas begs her father to show mercy.

Newport claims Wingfield died of fever to avert further conflict. Chief Powhatan offers a truce on the condition that Smith return to England. He reluctantly agrees and boards a ship. Pocahontas and Japazaws watch as Smith sails away.

== Cast ==
- Sandrine Holt as Pocahontas (Matoaka)
- Miles O'Keeffe as Captain John Smith
- Tony Goldwyn as Sir Edwin Wingfield
- Gordon Tootoosis as Chief Powhatan (Wahunsonacock)
- Billy Merasty as Kocoum
- Bucky Hill as Japazaws
- David Hemblen as Christopher Newport
- Billy Two Rivers as Mochiqua
- Kennetch Charlette as Opachisco
- Samaya Jardey as Ottermiske
- George Buza as Jules
- Desmond Ellis as Mitchell
- Shawn Mathieson as George
- Billy Oliver as Daniel
- Patrick Mark as Mattew
- Mark J. Richardson as Jeremy
- Peter Mehren as Man #1
- Daniel Hughes as Man #2
- Mona Staats as Medicine Woman
- Becky Butler as Native Singer

== Reception ==
TVGuide found that "This is a classic noble-savage love story, complete with stilted dialogue, easy- reading plot lines, and native American drum thumping. Finally, there are moments, notably a revealing love scene, that seem more mature than this built-for-kids film warrants. "

According to Indigenous Screen Cultures in Canada, the film "falsifies history, reproduces the discredited myth of the romance between Pocahontas and John Smith, introduces viewers to the “court” of Powhatan, “princess” Pocahontas, and “prince” Kocoum"".
