= Levelling the Land =

1991 album by the Levellers

Studio album by Levellers
- Released: 16 October 1991
- Studios: Ridge Farm (Surrey, England)
- Genre: Folk rock
- Length: 44:33
- Label: China
- Producer: Alan Scott

Levellers chronology
| A Weapon Called the Word (1990) | Levelling the Land (1991) | Levellers (1993) |

Singles from Levelling the Land
- 1. "One Way" Released: 1991; 2. "Far from Home" Released: 25 November 1991; 3. "Fifteen Years" Released: 11 May 1992 (EP)

Professional ratings
Review scores
| Source | Rating |
|---|---|
| AllMusic | 3.5/5 stars |
| Audio | NR |

Levelling the Land is the second full-length album by the Brighton folk-punk group the Levellers, released in 1991. The album reached number 14 in the UK album charts, and was certified Gold by the BPI. The original album pressing contained ten tracks but following the success of the single "Fifteen Years", which peaked at #11 on the UK charts in May 1992, the song was added as track three to later pressings.

This was the first Levellers album to feature the input of Simon Friend as songwriter, vocalist and musician. He replaced Alan Miles, who had sung and played guitar and mandolin on the previous album, A Weapon Called the Word. "Liberty Song" on this album was co-written by Miles.

The single "One Way" peaked at #51 in the UK singles chart in 1991, and again at #33 following a 1999 re-release. Reviewed in the Hard Report as featuring an "upbeat tempo that never waivers throughout", the song is known as the bands "all-time theme song". The album track "Battle of the Beanfield" describes the 1985 police action undertaken against New Age travellers.

== Track listing ==
- All band members are given writing credits on all the tracks.
1. "One Way" – 4:08
2. "The Game" – 3:28
3. "Fifteen Years" – 3:11 (not on initial pressing)
4. "The Boatman" – 5:56
5. "Liberty Song" – 4:29 (co-written by original member Alan Miles)
6. "Far from Home" - 3:22
7. "Sell Out" – 4:17
8. "Another Man's Cause" – 4:35
9. "The Road" – 4:00
10. "The Riverflow" – 3:02
11. "Battle of the Beanfield" – 3:41

The 2007 re-issue of the album also included the bonus tracks:

1. "Last Days of Winter"
2. "Dance Before the Storm"
3. "Hard Fight"
4. "The Devil Went Down to Georgia"
5. "Plastic Jeezus"

A bonus live disc was recorded at Glastonbury in 1992:

1. "The Game"
2. "World Freak Show" (co-written by original member Alan Miles)
3. "Dance Before the Storm"
4. "The Boatman"
5. "Far from Home"
6. "Sell Out"
7. "The Riverflow"
8. "Battle of the Beanfield"
9. "Jig/Three Friends"
10. "Liberty Song"
11. "One Way"
12. "The Devil Went Down to Georgia"

== Personnel ==
- Mark Chadwick – lead vocals, guitars, harmonica
- Simon Friend – guitars, mandolin, banjo, harmonica, backing vocals; lead vocals on tracks 4 and 11
- Jeremy Cunningham – bass guitar, album artwork
- Jonathan Sevink – fiddle
- Charlie Heather – drums, percussion
- Alan Scott – producer

== Charts ==
Chart performance for Levelling the Land
| Chart (2026) | Peak position |
|---|---|
| Belgian Albums (Ultratop Flanders) | 129 |
| Hungarian Physical Albums (MAHASZ) | 38 |
