= Blame It on Us =

The Dogs D'Amour

EP by The Dogs D'Amour
- Released: 1992
- Genre: Rock

The Dogs D'Amour chronology
The Dogs D'Amour (1988)	The Dogs D'Amour (1992)

Blame It On Us is an EP release, by the rock band The Dogs D'Amour. The recordings were made in 1983, but were not released officially until 1992, though they had been in circulation in bootleg form for the time between. It is the only official Dogs D'Amour release where Tyla is not the lead vocalist, instead it features original vocalist Ned Christie.

"Teenage" also featured on the infamous British glam punk compilation "Trash On Delivery", which was released via Flicknife Records in 1983.

== Track listing ==
1. "Teenage"
2. "Fool Like Me"
3. "Secret Girlfriend"
4. "Goodbye Charlene"

== Band ==
- Ned Christie - vocals
- Karl Watson - bass, backing vocals
- Tyla - guitar, backing vocals
- Nik Hall - guitar, backing vocals
- Maurice Alucard - drums
