= Seconds (The Dogs D'Amour album) =

Studio album by The Dogs D'Amour
- Released: 2000
- Genre: Rock
- Label: Basementboy Records

The Dogs D'Amour chronology
Happy Ever After (2000)	Seconds (2000)	When Bastards Go To Hell (2004)

Seconds is a release by rock band The Dogs D'Amour. The album was available as part of a limited edition "Dogs Dinner" boxet in 2000, that was sold as part of the fanclub in conjunction with the independent release of "Happy Ever After".

== Track listing ==
1. "The Girl"
2. "Jewel"
3. "Won't You Let Go"
4. "She Died Before She Got Young"
5. "Gone Are All the Angels"
6. "Damnation"
7. "Stealing from the Devil"
8. "Superstition Highway"
9. "Fun"
10. "Forgotten"
11. "Phantom (Run to Me)"

== Band ==
- Tyla - vocals, guitars
- Bam Ross - drums, percussion
- Jo "Dog" Almeida - guitars, slide, backing vocals
- Share Ross - bass, keys
