= In the Dynamite Jet Saloon =

Studio album by The Dogs D'Amour
- Released: 1988
- Genres: Hard rock, glam rock
- Label: China
- Producers: Mark Dearnley; The Dogs D'Amour

The Dogs D'Amour chronology
The State We're In (1984)	In the Dynamite Jet Saloon (1988)	A Graveyard of Empty Bottles (1989)

Professional ratings
Review scores
Source	Rating
Allmusic	link

In the Dynamite Jet Saloon is rock band The Dogs D'Amour's second studio album, released in 1988. The album is the first featuring what is considered the "classic" line-up of the band.

Three of the tracks from this album ("The Kid from Kensington", "I Don't Want You to Go" and "How Come It Never Rains") were released as singles, with promotional videos to go along with them. "How Come It Never Rains" was the highest charting, as it reached #44 on the UK Singles Chart, all three reached the top 100.

== Critical reception ==
Upon release Kirk Blows of British magazine Music Week reviewed album positively and found it "not as ragged and debauched as their live performances." As per him In the Dynamite Jet Saloon is "a powerful and toneful stomp through a selection of strong songs that highlight the band's strengths. Vocalist Tyla has an ear for a melody, a quality that will surprise many only familiar with the wasted, sleazy image."

== Track listing ==
All songs written by Tyla, except where noted.

1. "Debauchery" (Almeida, James, Ross, Tyla) - 3:57
2. "I Don't Want You to Go" - 3:49
3. "How Come It Never Rains" - 4:44
4. "Last Bandit" - 3:39
5. "Medicine Man" (James, Tyla) - 4:25
6. "Gonna Get It Right" - 3:38
7. "Everything I Want" - 3:58
8. "Heartbreak" (Almeida, James, Ross, Tyla) - 3:16
9. "Billy Two Rivers" - 3:16
10. "Wait Until I'm Dead" - 4:09
11. "Sometimes" - 4:18 *
12. "The Kid from Kensington" - 3:40 *
13. "The State I'm In" - 4:21 *
- Tracks 11–13 were bonus tracks on the CD version of the album. Vinyl and cassette copies consisted only of tracks 1–10.

== Band ==
- Tyla - vocals, guitars
- Jo "Dog" Almeida - guitars
- Steve James - bass
- Bam - drums

== Singles ==
- "The Kid from Kensington" (1988) UK #88
- "I Don't Want You to Go" (1988) UK #78
- "How Comes It Never Rains" (1989) UK #44
