= The Fountainhead (band) =

Irish band

- Origin: Dublin, Ireland
- Genres: New wave, pop rock, power pop
- Years active: 1982–1990
- Labels: China, Chrysalis
- Past members: Pat O'Donnell; Steve Belton; Peter McKinney; Philip Rennicks; Willy De Mange; Jim Corr

The Fountainhead was an Irish rock band founded by Steve Belton and Pat O'Donnell in 1982. In 1984, the duo won a music contest with a prize of 20 hours of recording time at Windmill Lane Studios. They used this time to record their first single, "Rhythm Method", which they released independently in 1984. After the song became popular on Irish radio, they were offered a contract with China Records.

The band's name comes from the novel of the same name by the Objectivist author and philosopher, Ayn Rand.

China Records released the band's first studio album, The Burning Touch, in 1986. For touring, Belton and O'Donnell brought in drummer Peter McKinney, bass player Willie Demange, and keyboardist Phil Rennick. The expanded lineup debuted on 17 May 1986 at the Self Aid benefit concert. Their performance of the song "Feel It Now" appeared on the follow-up Live for Ireland charity album.

The Fountainhead began a North American tour in November 1986. Songs from their final American show, at Whisky a Go Go on 9 December 1986, were recorded and released as an EP in 1987.

Their second and final studio album, Voice of Reason, was released in 1988. The group disbanded in 1990.

== Discography ==
=== Albums ===
- The Burning Touch (1986)
- Live (EP, 1987)
- Voice of Reason (1988)

=== Singles ===
- "Rhythm Method" (1984)
- "Feel It Now" (1986) IRE #30
- "Seeing Is Believing" (1986)
- "So Good Now" & Heart & Soul (1987) China Records WOK 13
- "Someone Like You" (1988)
- "Angel" (1988)
