= Peace (Levellers album) =

Studio album by Levellers
- Released: 14 August 2020
- Recorded: Metway Studios
- Genre: Rock; alternative rock; folk punk
- Label: On the Fiddle Recordings
- Producer: Sean Lakeman

Levellers chronology
We the Collective (2018)	Peace (2020)	Together All the Way (2023)

Peace is the twelfth studio album by folk-punk rock band the Levellers. The album entered the British album charts at #8, the band's highest charting entry since 1997's Mouth to Mouth reached #5, and improving on previous release We the Collective's #12 position. The 11-track album followed 2018's We the Collective, but is the band's first album composed entirely of new material since 2012's Static on the Airwaves. Peace was recorded at the band's personal recording studio Metway Studios, and released on their label On the Fiddle Recordings Three singles were released in the months leading up to the album, "Food Roof Family", "Calling Out" and "Generation Fear".

The album was produced by Sean Lakeman.

== Track listing ==
1. "Food Roof Family"
2. "Generation Fear"
3. "Four Boys Lost"
4. "Burning Hate Like Fire"
5. "Born That Way"
6. "Our New Day"
7. "Calling Out"
8. "Ghosts In The Water"
9. "The Men Who Would Be King"
10. "Albion & Phoenix"
11. "Our Future"

The deluxe edition included 9 additional tracks:

1. "All The Unknown"
2. "Sleep Well"
3. "Improperty"
4. "Revelation"
5. "The Men Who Would Be King (Max Pashm Remix)"
6. "That Way Born (Hannah Moule Remake)"
7. "Burning Hate Like Fire (Lean Fiddler Remix)"
8. "Generation Fear (Alex Banks Remix)"
9. "Our Future (Cut La Roc Remix)"

== Personnel ==
=== Musicians ===
- Mark Chadwick - guitars, vocals
- Charlie Heather - drums/percussion
- Jeremy Cunningham - bass guitar, artwork
- Simon Friend - guitars, vocals, mandolin
- Jonathan Sevink - fiddle
- Matt Savage - keyboard
