= Nick Burbridge =

British writer (born 1954)

- Born: 1954 (age 71–72)
- Occupations: writer and musician

Nick Burbridge (born 1954) is a British novelist, poet, dramatist, journalist, short story and song writer. He has chronic depression, and his writing often concerns itself with the dispossessed, those at the margins of society. In fRoots, Jerry Gilbert described him as "a second-generation Irishman with a high intellect and an angry disposition."

== Writing ==
Burbridge's short stories and poetry have appeared in numerous literary magazines, such as Agenda, Stand and Ambit, Arts Council Anthologies, and on BBC Radio 4.

Burbridge's plays have been performed on the Brighton and London fringe, and on tour. Bright Red Theatre's double-bill Neck and Cutting Room, which dealt with political extremism, toured nationally in 1988. Vermin, about the homeless, was premiered at the Brighton Festival and transferred to the Finborough in 1991. Cock Robin, about recovering alcoholics, was a runner up in the Verity Bargate Award for new writing, while Scrap, dealing with teenage disorders, received an Arts Council Research and Development award in 1996. Burbridge's fringe work was revived by Otherplace Productions at Bankside's Rose Theatre in Hard Chair Stories, a piece about living with severe disability, and taken to 3 & 10, Brighton Festival 2008.

As the founder of Tommy McDermott's Theatre in 1989, a company committed to producing contemporary drama centred on social issues, Burbridge worked with, among others, the Soho Theatre, Jack Bradley (Literary Manager at the National Theatre) and playwrights Mark Ravenhill and Diane Samuels. This led to a number of media appearances, including a televised debate about arts funding, on a panel with Patrick Garland and Nicholas de Jongh. He has also had work produced on BBC Radio, such as the Monday Play Grosse Fugue and the Afternoon Play Rites of Passage.

Burbridge has published the full-length novel Operation Emerald, under the pseudonym Dominic McCartan, concerning those caught up in the Troubles in Northern Ireland. As a manuscript, this reached the final shortlist for the 1984 Triple First Award, run jointly by The Bodley Head, Penguin Books and The Book Club Association, adjudicated by William Trevor and Graham Greene. A non-fiction work, War Without Honour, where he collaborated with Fred Holroyd, an ex-military intelligence officer, was launched at the House of Commons, and caused a political stir. Burbridge originally secured a commission from Harrap, but the company withdrew before going to press, and the work was issued by a small independent publisher, Medium; according to Tam Dalyell, the material concerned "the probity of the British Government at the top", though others have not been convinced by the claims. Burbridge has also written analytical articles on poetry and ethnic music for magazines such as R2 (Rock'n'Reel) exploring the link between personal and political disorder and creativity.

In August 2010, Burbridge contributed to an eBook collection of political poems entitled Emergency Verse – Poetry in Defence of the Welfare State edited by Alan Morrison He has written a new full length poetry collection, The Unicycle Set, published by Waterloo Press, February 2011.

== Music ==
Burbridge was the founder, in 1986, of the folk-rock band McDermott's Two Hours who released the album, The Enemy Within in 1989. At their peak, the band performed regularly at festivals like Glastonbury, Reading and Womad. At that time, he signed a publishing deal with the producer Joe Boyd. In 1993, folk-rock band The Levellers, who cite Burbridge's band as a major formative influence, covered one track, Dirty Davey, on their own eponymous recording, which briefly topped the UK album charts. The band have rarely performed together in recent years, but four – uncommercial yet critically acclaimed – albums of Burbridge's songs have been released since 2000. Burbridge recorded tracks at the Levellers' studio in Brighton, and other musicians augmented his work. The first three, World Turned Upside Down (2001), Claws And Wings (2003), and Disorder (2004) were released as McDermott's Two Hours vs Levellers recordings, while the last, Goodbye to the Madhouse (2007) appeared as a McDermott's Two Hours album. 2012 saw the release of Gathered, an acoustic recording, with multi-instrumentalist Tim Cotterell, while the following year a McDermott's Two Hours digital compilation album, Anticlockwise, appeared. 2017 marked the release of a sequel to Gathered, entitled Resolved, the best received, critically speaking, of all the albums.

Burbridge's songs have been covered by folk artists like Damien Barber and Mike Wilson on Under The Influence and Maggie Boyle. In 2008, he combined poetry-reading with music and effects by The Levellers' Jon Sevink, on a privately released album entitled All Kinds of Disorder, an elaboration on the themes in his book, and an original form of statement on life at the margins. In R2 Steve Caseman called it "an exemplary combination of poetry and music," while fRoots recorded how "human drama and frailty is read out with relish along with keen observations of behaviour that celebrates the outsider and encourages the closet revolutionary in us all".

== Reception ==
Reviews of his three books of poetry On Call, All Kinds of Disorder, and The Unicycle Set praised the "richness and variety" and the "lyrical, personal voices". In a 3:AM Magazine feature, Richard Marshall wrote that "the compromised tenderness and strange wrongness" of the poems' subjects marked Burbridge as "a poet of dysfunctional sensibility" – while Helena Nelson commented in Ambit, that although Burbridge's poetry sometimes seemed prose-like, at the expense of cadence and rhythm, "I will remember him". Reviews of his plays have recognised the power of the writing, but questioned the impact of the underlying depressive tone, and whether, as Mick Martin in The Guardian asked, he deals "in dramatic characterisation or political point scoring", however interesting his characters, or however challenging the argument. Martin Hoyle wrote in The Times that to see a state of the Kingdom allegory in Burbridge's grimly misanthropic quintet set in "a derelict toy warehouse" would be easy, the satire was heavy-handed, but concluded that "raw emotion is certainly there and plenty of anger is generated." While The Independent noted: "There is disturbing drama in the violent interplay", yet wondered where the audience was being taken.

Q Magazine called the title track of World Turned Upside Down "a crusty anthem", and La Pasionaria "the best Spanish Civil War song since The Clash's Spanish Bombs." Simon Jones wrote of Claws And Wings in fRoots magazine that Burbridge made the album "for all the right reasons", and that "authenticity is a big part of what he's about." Disorder prompted the assertion that "Burbridge always was a caustic writer", but in his individualistic approach, "in fact he was pointing out the very obvious flaws in our so-called civilised society." When Goodbye to the Madhouse appeared in the autumn of 2007, fRoots summarised the change in focus, commenting that "Burbridge's vitriol has been toned down", and "thoughts of band and writer seem to be rising above the national into overarching concepts that, like the work of the best, apply at any number of levels". The acoustic album Gathered earned Nick Burbridge the title of Best Songwriter in the 2013 Spiral Earth awards, and in the same year his work appeared on the AQA A Level Communication and Culture syllabus.

== Major works ==
=== Books ===
- Operation Emerald (as Dominic McCartan) Pluto Press, London,1985. ISBN 0-7453-0006-5
- War Without Honour (Fred Holroyd with Nick Burbridge) Medium, London, 1989. ISBN 1-872398-00-6
- On Call, Envoi Poets Publications, 1994. ISBN 1-874161-24-0
- All Kinds of Disorder, Waterloo Press, 2006. ISBN 1-902731-29-8
- The Unicycle Set, Waterloo Press, 2011. ISBN 978-1-906742-28-7

=== Plays ===
Neck and Cutting Room (1987)

Vermin (1991)

Cock Robin (1992)

Grosse Fugue (BBC Radio, 1995)

Scrap (1996)

Rites of Passage (BBC Radio, 1999)

=== Studio albums ===
The Enemy Within (1989)

World Turned Upside Down (2001)

Claws And Wings (2003)

Disorder (2004)

Goodbye to the Madhouse (2007)

All Kinds of Disorder (2008)

Gathered (2012)

Anticlockwise (2013)

Resolved (2017)

=== Live & compilation albums ===
Live at Fernham Hall (2005)

Anticlockwise (2013)
