= Zeitgeist (Levellers album) =

Studio album by Levellers
- Released: 28 August 1995
- Studio: Metway Studios
- Genre: Rock, alternative rock, folk punk
- Length: 46:41
- Label: China
- Producer: Al Scott

Levellers chronology
Levellers (1993)	Zeitgeist (1995)	Mouth to Mouth (1997)

Singles from Zeitgeist
- 1. "Hope St." Released: 31 July 1995; 2. "Fantasy" Released: 2 October 1995; 3. "Just the One" Released: 1995; 4. "Exodus – Live EP" Released: 8 July 1996

Professional ratings
Review scores
Source	Rating
AllMusic	3/5 stars
Alternative Press	4/5 stars

Zeitgeist is the fourth album by the Levellers. It was released in August 1995 and reached No. 1 in the UK album charts, making it the band's most successful album. Two singles were released from the album – "Hope St.", which reached No. 12 in the UK single charts, and "Fantasy", which reached 16. Additionally, a re-recorded version of "Just the One" featuring Joe Strummer was released, reaching No. 12, as well as a live version of "Exodus" from the later Headlights, White Lines, Black Tar Rivers (Best Live) album the next year, which reached No. 24.

Zeitgist was the first album the Levellers recorded at their own studio in Brighton, Metway Studios.

== Track listing ==
1. "Hope St."
2. "The Fear"
3. "Exodus"
4. "Maid of the River"
5. "Saturday to Sunday"
6. "4 a.m."
7. "Forgotten Ground"
8. "Fantasy"
9. "P.C. Keen"
10. "Just the One"
11. "Haven't Made It"
12. "Leave This Town"
13. "Men-an-Tol"

The 2007 re-issue included the bonus tracks:

1. "Miles Away"
2. "Your 'Ouse"
3. "Drinking for England"
4. "Searchlights"

== Personnel ==
=== Musicians ===
- Mark Chadwick - guitars, vocals
- Charlie Heather - drums/percussion
- Jeremy Cunningham - bass guitar, artwork
- Simon Friend - guitars, vocals, mandolin
- Jonathan Sevink - fiddle

Guest musicians

- Joe Strummer - piano on "Just the One'

== Charts ==
=== Weekly charts ===
Chart (1995)	Peak position
Belgian Albums (Ultratop Flanders)	7
Dutch Albums (Album Top 100)	46
German Albums (Offizielle Top 100)	42
Scottish Albums (OCC)	8
Swedish Albums (Sverigetopplistan)	5
UK Albums (OCC)	1

=== Year-end charts ===
Chart (1995)	Position
UK Albums (OCC)	84
