= When Bastards Go to Hell =

Studio album by The Dogs D'Amour
- Released: 2004
- Genre: Rock
- Label: Rock Treasures

The Dogs D'Amour chronology
Seconds (2000)	When Bastards Go to Hell (2004)	Let Sleeping Dogs... (2005)

When Bastards Go to Hell is an album released under the name The Dogs D'Amour in 2004. The album differs largely from all of the previous releases under the name Dogs D'Amour, both stylistically and in terms of band members.

Tyla played most instruments on the album, with his wife Yella. It is essentially similar to many of the solo albums Tyla released as a solo artist around this period, it has received generally negative responses from the band's fanbase.

== Track listing ==
1. "Ain't No Loser... Babe"
2. "Barbed Wire Ball"
3. "Shadow Town"
4. "Bad Habit Motel"
5. "Doomsday Times"
6. "Just One"
7. "X-Generation"
8. "No One But You"
9. "4am"
10. "Waiting for the Next"
11. "Grace of God"
12. "What Price?"
13. "When Bastards Go to Hell"
14. "The Vampyres"

== Band ==
- Tyla - guitars, bass, lead vocals, percussion
- Yella - vocals
- Juli - drums
- Henry Twinch - keys

== Guests ==
The following musicians featured on track 13 only.

- Darrell Bath - guitars
- Dill Davis - drums
- Dan Turner - lead guitar
- Chris Hayter - rhythm guitar
