= Unleashed... =

Live album by The Dogs D'Amour
- Released: June 13, 2006
- Recorded: 2005
- Genre: Glam rock
- Length: 69:17
- Label: King Outlaw

Unleashed... is a live album by The Dogs D'Amour, released June 13, 2006. It was recorded at the Robin 2 in Wolverhampton, England, the hometown of the band's leader, Tyla. The album features none of the most well known classic line up band members.

== Track listing ==
All songs written by Tyla.

1. "Get By"
2. "Last Bandit"
3. "I Don't Want You to Go"
4. "Never Give Up"
5. "Heroine"
6. "Roll Over"
7. "Only Girl I Ever Loved"
8. "All of Them Great"
9. "Bloody Mary"
10. "Drunk Like Me"
11. "What You Do"
12. "How Come It Never Rains"
13. "Firework Girl"
14. "Errol Flynn"
15. "Satellite Kid"

== Credits ==
- Tyla: Lead Vocals, Guitar, Bass
- Yella: Backing Vocals
- Tom Spencer: Guitar, Backing Vocals
- Rich Jones: Guitar, Backing Vocals
- Mark Stanway: Keyboards
- Simon Hansen: Drums
