= Hello Pig =

Studio album by Levellers
- Released: 4 September 2000
- Genre: Rock, alternative rock
- Label: China
- Producer: Mark Wallis

Levellers chronology
One Way of Life (1998)	Hello Pig (2000)	Green Blade Rising (2002)

Professional ratings
Review scores
Source	Rating
Ox-Fanzine	Mixed

Hello Pig is the sixth studio album by the Levellers, released in 2000 on China Records. The album was the first by the band to feature Matt Savage.

== Track listing ==
1. "Happy Birthday Revolution"
2. "Invisible"
3. "The Weed That Killed Elvis"
4. "Edge of the World"
5. "Do It Again Tomorrow"
6. "Walk Lightly"
7. "Voices on the Wind"
8. "Sold England"
9. "Modern Day Tragedy"
10. "Dreams"
11. "61 Minutes of Pleading"
12. "Red Sun Burns"
13. "Gold and Silver"

The song "61 Minutes of Pleading" is based on the death of Loraine Whiting, who bled to death over the course of an hour while on the phone to a 999 police call handler after being shot by her husband, who had then shot himself dead and lay next to her. Emergency services personnel outside the property considered it too dangerous to enter, following a recent similar incident in which a gunman had forced his injured hostage to claim he was dead in order to lure emergency crews in, before shooting dead two ambulance crew members and a police officer.

== Personnel ==
Levellers

- Mark Chadwick - guitars, vocals
- Charlie Heather - drums/percussion
- Jeremy Cunningham - bass guitar, artwork
- Simon Friend - guitars, vocals, mandolin
- Jonathan Sevink - fiddle
