= A Weapon Called the Word =

Studio album by Levellers
- Released: 1990
- Recorded: 1990
- Studio: Loco, Wales
- Genre: Folk rock
- Length: 56:58
- Label: Musidisc
- Producer: Phil Tennant

Levellers chronology
A Weapon Called the Word (1990)	Levelling the Land (1991)

Professional ratings
Review scores
Source	Rating
AllMusic	3/5 stars

A Weapon Called the Word is the debut album by English folk rock band the Levellers, released in 1990. The album contains re-recorded tracks from the band's first two E.P. recordings: Carry Me E.P. (upon which the tracks "Carry Me" and "England My Home" were originally released) and Outside/Inside E.P. (which contained "Outside/Inside", "Barrel of the Gun" and "I Have No Answers"). The band did not re-record the track "The Last Days of Winter" from the Carry Me E.P. despite the fact the album's title A Weapon Called the Word is taken from that song.

Two versions of the album exist: the original 1990 release which has 12 tracks and a 1996 re-release by Musidisc which added two live recordings of the band's guitarist/vocalists Mark Chadwick and Simon Friend plus a remix of the track "Three Friends" to the end of the album.

This album is noteworthy in the Levellers' catalogue for being the only full-length album to feature the musical input of Alan Miles, who played guitar, harmonica and mandolin and supplied backing vocals as well as contributing musical arrangements. He was subsequently replaced by vocalist and multi-instrumentalist Simon Friend.

The 1996 re-release credits Simon Friend in the liner notes despite him not being a band member at the time of recording. This is due to the added live tracks "Social Insecurity" and "Cardboard Box City" being written and sung by Friend.

A Weapon Called the Word has achieved gold status, despite never having appeared in the album charts, a rare feat reflecting steady and consistent sales rather than strong initial sales. Only "World Freakshow" was released as a single, as Musidisc's alleged mismanagement of the promotion and pressing of the single led the Levellers to part company with the label shortly after release.

== Track listing ==
- All band members are given writers' credits on all the tracks.
1. "World Freak Show" – 3:29
2. "Carry Me" – 4:57
3. "Outside/Inside" – 2:57
4. "Together All the Way" – 4:16
5. "Barrel of the Gun" – 2:49
6. "Three Friends" – 4:20
7. "I Have No Answers" – 4:10
8. "No Change" – 3:24
9. "Blind Faith" – 3:50
10. "The Ballad of Robbie Jones" – 2:40
11. "England My Home" – 3:38
12. "What You Know" – 4:03

1996 re-release bonus tracks

13. "Social Insecurity" (live) – 2:46
14. "Cardboard Box City" (live) – 4:05
15. "Three Friends" (remix) – 5:34

== Personnel ==
=== Musicians ===
- Mark Chadwick – vocals, guitar, banjo
- Alan Miles – mandolin, electric guitar, harmonica, vocals
- Jonathan Sevink – violin, tin whistle
- Charles Heather – drums
- Jeremy Cunningham – bass guitar, bouzouki, artwork
- Tim Lewis – wurlitzer
- Phil Tennant – guitar
- Simon Friend – vocals and guitar on bonus tracks (13 and 14)

=== Technical staff ===
- Phil Tennant – production
- Tim Lewis – engineering
- The Yes/No People and Andy Boucher – remixing of track 15 for 1996 re-release
