= The Dogs D'Amour =

English rock band

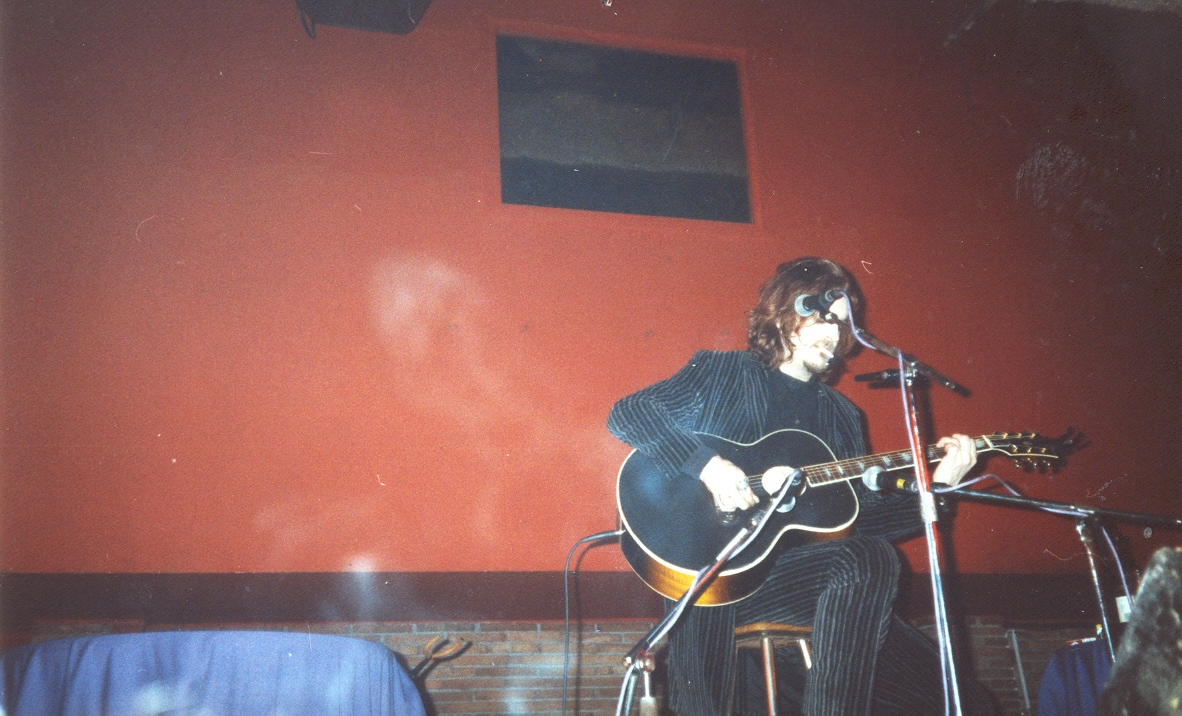
- Tyla in 2001

Background information
- Origin: London, England
- Genres: Hard rock, glam rock, blues rock
- Years active: 1983–1991, 1992–1994, 2000, 2002–present
- Label: China Records (previous)
- Members: Tyla
- Past members: Steve James; Jo "Dog" Almeida; Bam Bam; Ned Christie; Nick Halls; Karl Watson; Dave Kusworth; Paul Hornby; Mark Drax; Yella; Mark Duncan; Darrell Bath; Tony Manno; Nate Arling; Adam Arling; Rich Jones; Neil Leyton; Tom Spencer; Share Ross; Simon Hanson; Gary Pennick

The Dogs D'Amour are an English bluesey hard rock band formed in London in 1983. Over the years the band has had various line-ups, the only constant being vocalist Tyla. Their music has been described as a mixture of the Rolling Stones, the Faces and glam punk.

Their 1989 release, A Graveyard of Empty Bottles, reached No. 16 on the UK Albums Chart while the single "Satellite Kid" reached No. 26 on the UK Singles Chart.

In 1991, the band broke up onstage, before reforming briefly in the early 1990s for the release of their sixth studio album More Unchartered Heights of Disgrace. After this, however, the most famous incarnation of the band ceased to exist. There was another brief reunion in 2000 and an album, but, throughout the 2000s, Tyla has been touring and releasing albums under the band name, which is vastly different from their older material.

In December 2012 the 'classic' line-up of Tyla, Jo 'Dog' Almeida, Steve James and Bam agreed to reform to play a series of benefit concerts for their long-time friend, and former bandmate, Paul Hornby, who was battling cancer. Hornby died on 7 July 2015.

== Style ==
The music of the Dogs D'Amour can be described as a mixture of The Rolling Stones and Faces-style blues rock and Hanoi Rocks-style glam punk. Unlike popular bands of the time, who often had misogynistic themes, the Dogs D'Amour relied more on romantic themes and a poetic lyrical style. Tyla was also a fan of Charles Bukowski, and many of his lyrics reflect Bukowski's prosaic style.

== Biography ==
The origins of the band can be traced to The Bordello Boys, formed in late 1982 by Tyla. An American vocalist who was staying in England at the time, Ned Christie (real name Robert Stoddard), was brought into the project and he gave the band the name The Dogs D'Amour, and co-wrote many early songs with Tyla. Guitarist Nick Halls, bass guitarist Karl Watson and drummer Bam completed the line-up.

The Dogs D'Amour played around fifty live shows during this era and recorded two separate recording session demos. On the strength of the demos, the band was signed to a record deal with Kumibeat Records from Finland. However, shortly before the band was scheduled to record their first album, Christie left the band in late 1983 because of musical differences with guitarist Tyla. Another reason for the split was that Christie had recently started another band with Bam called On The Wire and had his own recording commitments scheduled with that band, around the same time that the Dogs D'Amour were due to record their own first album. The entire line-up with the exception of Tyla and Watson left the band during this time.

=== The State We're In: Tyla rebuilds the band ===
Tyla took over on lead vocals (while still playing guitar) to replace Ned Christie and recorded the band's first album, The State We're In, in early 1984. Dave Kusworth from The Jacobites and Paul Hornby from The Gunslingers were both brought in on guitar and drums to round out the complete band line-up. Hornby had been a founding member of another London band, The Quireboys, earlier in the year.

The following year, the band returned from Finland to the UK and supported Johnny Thunders who was touring for the Que Sera, Sera album at the time. Original Dogs' drummer Bam came back to replace Hornby, and Jo "Dog" Almeida took over from Kusworth on guitar when he left to continue The Jacobites with Nikki Sudden.

The Dogs D'Amour then signed a contract with a Japanese label Watanabe, but did not release any material with them. More changes came during this period when, bass guitarist Karl Watson left and was replaced by Mark Duncan. However, Duncan's stay in the band was only brief and he gave way for the Swiss bass guitarist Mark Drax for a tour in Paris, France.

=== The classic era: late 1980s, early 1990s ===
A more permanent bass guitarist was recruited by 1987. Steve James was part of what would be known as the "classic" Dogs line-up which also included Tyla, Jo "Dog" Almeida and Bam. This line-up signed a record deal with China Records in 1988.

The band released its second album In The Dynamite Jet Saloon in 1988. Essentially, this is the album that introduced the British general public to the band. It contained singles such as "The Kid From Kensington", "I Don't Want You To Go" and "How Come It Never Rains?", all of which reached the UK Singles Chart.

Unlike the four-year gap between their first and second albums, the Dogs became more prolific, releasing their acoustic mini-LP A Graveyard of Empty Bottles in 1989. This album proved to be the highest charting recording of their career, reaching No. 16 on the UK Albums Chart. During this year, the band toured with Mick Ronson and Ian Hunter.

With the group disbanded and in shambles in Los Angeles, Bam flew back to UK and joined The Wildhearts with Ginger, CJ and Danny. Meanwhile, Tyla wrote a book of poetry. A year later the Dogs D'Amour reunited with a new line-up. Jo Almeida decided not to return to the band as guitarist; Darrell Bath was brought in to replace him. In 1993, the band recorded a new album, ...More Unchartered Heights of Disgrace. It charted well and received favourable reviews. One of the singles from the album was a cover of the Small Faces song "All or Nothing".

By 1994, the Dogs D'Amour had broken up again. The final act of this line-up was the recording of Tyla's solo album The Life And Times Of A Ballad Monger. Although this album was released in the name of Tyla, it includes all of the Dogs D'Amour members from the 1993 line-up.

=== Activity in the 2000s ===
In 2000, The Dogs D'Amour reunited for a short time with a line-up of Tyla, Jo "Dog" Almeida, Bam, and Share Ross (Bam's wife and a member of Vixen). They released an album Happy Ever After that year, along with a special fan club only release Seconds. They did a tour of Europe and the UK, opening for Alice Cooper. Bam and Share then left the band and carried on touring and releasing music in their own act named Bubble.

In April 2011, Tyla released In the Dynamite Jet Saloon MMX.

In November 2012, a Dogs D'Amour show with the classic line-up was announced at London's Borderline club on 22 February 2013, to help raise funds for their long-time friend and former drummer of the band, Paul Hornby. After tickets quickly sold out, the band added another show at the Borderline in London on 23 February, along with some other dates across the UK and in Spain. Shortly after the 2013 reunion, Tyla put out a statement declaring that he would not be appearing again under the name Dogs D'Amour.

In 2018, Tyla formed a new version of the band minus Jo Dog, Steve James and Bam, calling it "Tyla's Dogs D'Amour." This version of the band has since released several studio and live albums.

== Members ==
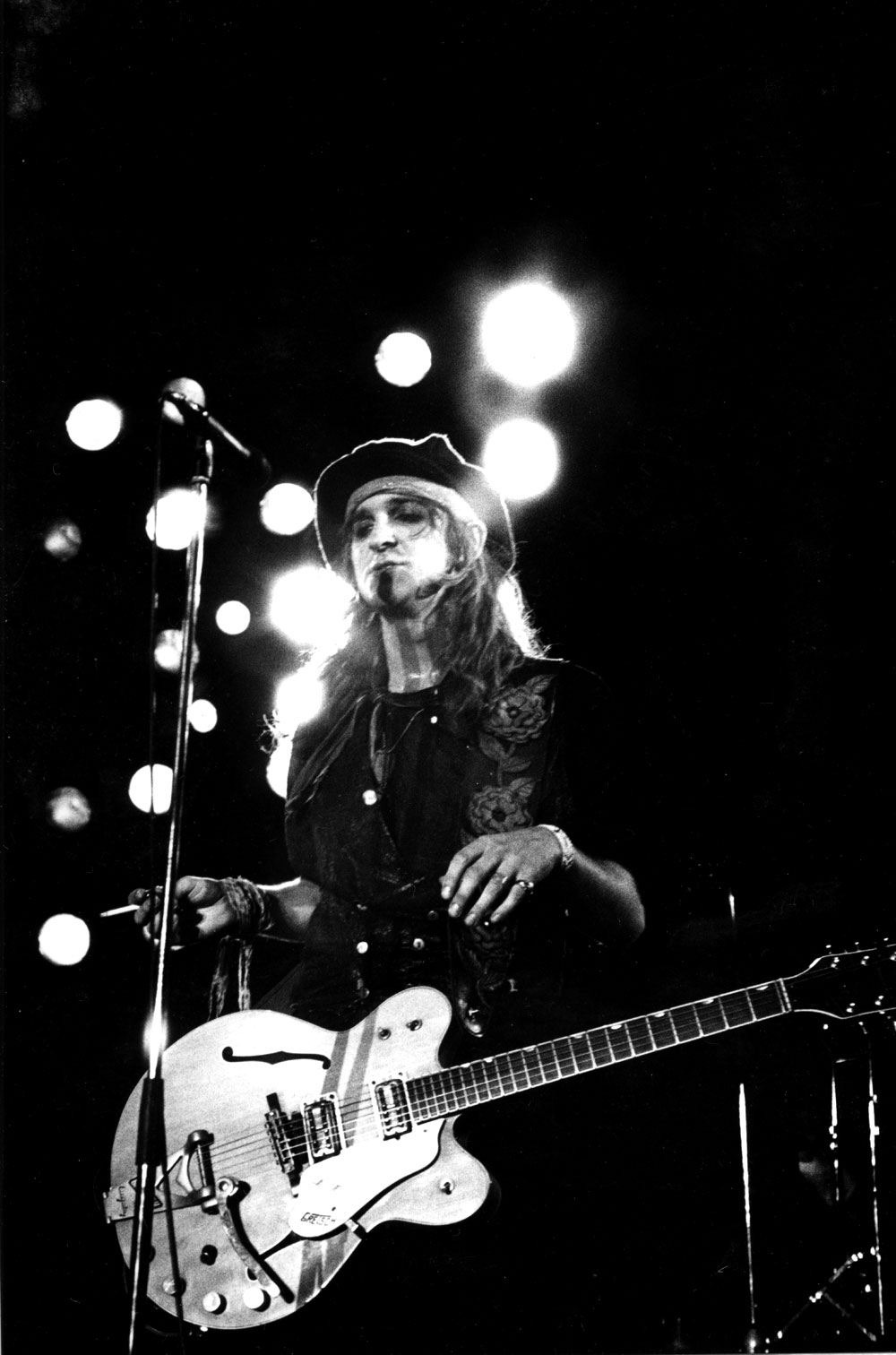
Tyla, the only persistent member,at Hibiya Open-Air Concert Hall, 1989

=== Classic line-up ===
- Tyla - vocals, guitar
- Bam - drums, vocals
- Jo Dog - guitar, vocals
- Steve James - bass, saxophone, acoustic guitars, harmonica and vocals

=== Former ===
- Ned Christie - lead vocals
- Adam Arling - bass guitar, backing vocals
- Nathan Arling - drums
- Tony Manno - guitar, backing vocals
- Nick Halls - guitar
- Karl Watson - bass guitar
- Dave Kusworth - guitar, backing vocals
- Paul Hornby - drums
- Mark Drax - live bass guitar
- Mark Duncan - live bass guitar
- Dave Tregunna - studio bass guitar (recordings 1985 - 1986 only plus Live Bass 2011-2012)
- Darrell Bath - guitar, backing vocals
- Share Ross - bass, keyboards, vocals
- Scotty Mulvey - Piano
- Mark Stanway - Keyboards
- Justin Rabbetts (Strange Nature)- live drums for 1995/6 UK, France and Portugal tours
- Danny McCormack - live bass and backing vocals
- Tom Spencer - live guitar, live bass
- Rich Jones - live guitar and backing vocals
- Neil Leyton - live guitar and backing vocals

== Discography ==
=== Albums ===
- The State We're In (Kumibeat - 1984)
- In The Dynamite Jet Saloon (China - 1988) UK No. 97
- Errol Flynn (China - 1989) UK No. 22
- Straight??!!' (China - 1990) UK No. 32
- ...More Unchartered Heights of Disgrace (China - 1993) UK No. 30
- Happy Ever After (Artful - 2000)
- Seconds (Basementboy - 2000)
- When Bastards Go To Hell (Rock Treasures - 2004)
- Let Sleeping Dogs... (King Outlaw - 2005)
- In the Dynamite Jet Saloon MMX ( King Outlaw 2011)
- Graveyard of Empty Bottles MMXII (King Outlaw 2011)

=== Live albums ===
- Unleashed (King Outlaw - 2006)
- Swinging The Bottles - The BBC Radio Sessions (Cargo Records - 2017)

=== Compilations ===
- (Un)authorized Bootleg Album (1988)
- Dogs Hits & Bootleg Album (1991)
- Skeletons: The Best Of... (1997)
- Heart Shaped Skulls (best of '88-'93) (2004)
- Dynamite China Years — Complete Recordings 1988-1993 (2024)

=== EPs ===
- The Dogs D'Amour - (1988)
- A Graveyard of Empty Bottles (China - 1989) UK No. 16
- Trail of Tears (China - 1989)
- Blame It On Us - (1992)
- All or Nothing - The EP - (1993)
- Cyber Recordings - (2013)

=== Singles ===
This list of singles only contains ones which entered the charts. For information on all singles released please see specific album's articles.

Title	Release	UK Chart Position
"The Kid from Kensington"	1988	88
"I Don't Want You to Go"	1988	78
"How Come It Never Rains"	1989	44
"Satellite Kid"	1989	26
"Trail of Tears"	1989	47
"Victims of Success"	1990	36
"Empty World"	1990	61
"Back on the Juice"	1990	97
"All or Nothing" (Small Faces cover)	1993	53
Pretty Pretty Once	1993	80
