= Levellers (band) =

English folk rock band

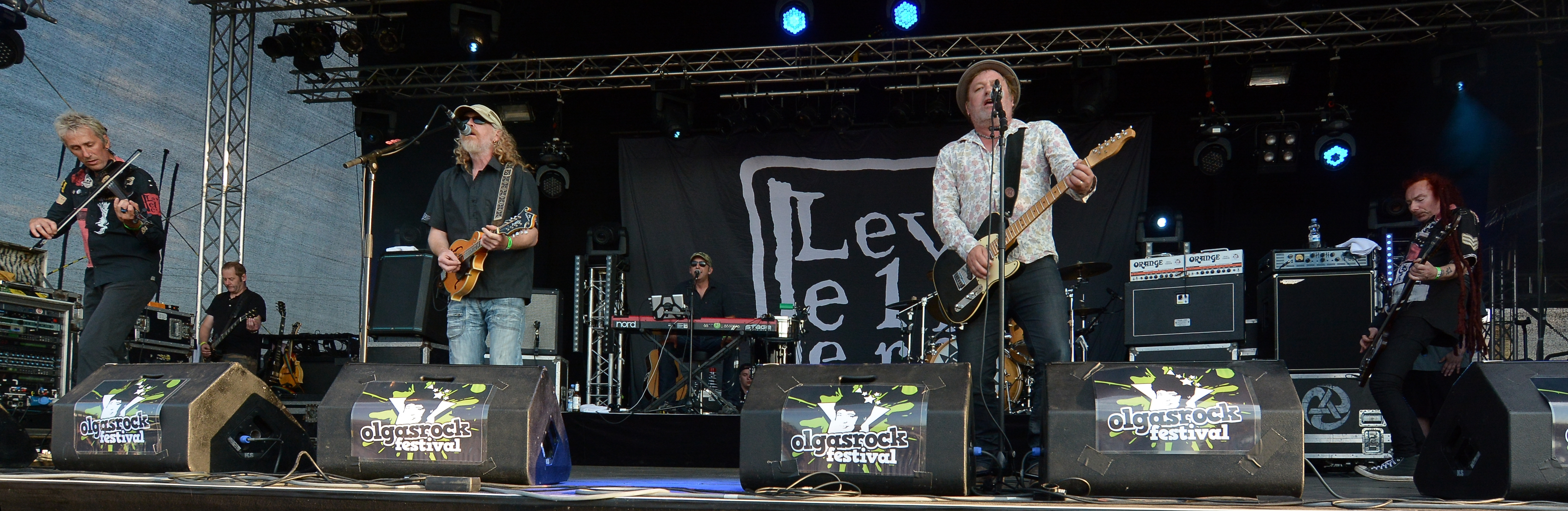
- Levellers at Olgas Rock Festival in 2015

Background information
- Origin: Brighton, England
- Genres: Alternative rock; British folk rock; folk punk; Celtic rock; anarcho-punk
- Years active: 1988–present
- Labels: Musidisc, China Records, Eagle Records, On the Fiddle
- Members: Mark Chadwick; Jeremy Cunningham; Charlie Heather; Jon Sevink; Simon Friend; Matt Savage; Dan Donnelly
- Past members: David Buckmeister; Alan Miles
- Website: https://www.levellers.co.uk/

Levellers are an English folk rock and anarcho-punk band formed in Brighton, East Sussex, in 1988, consisting of Mark Chadwick (vocals, guitar), Jeremy Cunningham (bass guitar), Charlie Heather (drums), Jon Sevink (violin), Simon Friend (guitar, mandolin, vocals), Matt Savage (keyboards) and Dan Donnelly (guitar, mandolin, vocals). Taking their name from the Levellers political movement, the band released their first EP in 1989 and LP in 1990, with international success following upon signing to China Records and the release of their second album, Levelling the Land. The band were among the most popular indie bands in Britain in the early 1990s, and performed at the Glastonbury Festival, first in 1992, then in 1994, where they performed as the headline act on The Pyramid Stage to a record crowd of 300,000 people. They continue to record and tour.

== History ==
=== 1988–1990 ===
The band was formed with Mark Chadwick on guitar and lead vocals, Jeremy Cunningham on bass guitar, and Charlie Heather on drums. Jon Sevink, the brother of Chadwick's girlfriend, was brought in to play the fiddle. Chadwick's flatmate "Bucky" was brought in to play the guitar, but lost interest after a few months.

Chadwick and Cunningham composed their first recordings for the compact cassettes An Agreement of the People and All the Free Commons of England. A group of fans known as the "happy hitchers" would hitch-hike around the country, following the band while they were on tour.

Their first EP, Carry Me, was released in 1989 and contained the songs "Carry Me" and "England My Home", which received Radio 2 airplay. At that time the band recruited Alan Miles to play harmonica, guitar, and mandolin and to perform backing vocals. This lineup produced the EP Outside/Inside and toured throughout 1989 and most of 1990.

After re-releasing two EPs on their own Hag label, in 1989, the Levellers signed a contract with French record label Musidisc. Their first album, A Weapon Called the Word, was released in 1990 and went platinum. The first single from the album was "World Freak Show".

=== 1990–1994 ===
After an acrimonious split with Musidisc, the Levellers were discovered by Derek Green and signed to China Records.

At this point Miles became disenchanted with touring and left the band. The Levellers recruited Simon Friend who had played some acoustic support slots for the band in the past. Around this time Friend and Chadwick played a number of low-key shows as "The Levellers 2", mostly performing songs that had been in Friend's repertoire as a solo singer-songwriter.

1991 saw the release of the Levellers' second album, Levelling the Land, which entered the charts at number 14. The anthemic single "One Way", despite not reaching the Top 40, became a popular song and live favourite for years to come among the travelling and indie music community, as well as "The Boatman" and the telling of the story of "Battle of the Beanfield".

Throughout 1992 the band enjoyed a series of successful tours, particularly their debut on one of the main stages of the Glastonbury Festival. Mixing tracks from their first two LPs with a couple of more obscure songs and a cover of Charlie Daniels' "The Devil Went Down to Georgia", the Levellers' performance secured their place on the large Pyramid Stage for the following year. The band also scored a chart hit with the 15 Years EP.

The generally gloomy atmosphere that surrounded the band is reflected in the darker tone of the resulting Levellers album. Despite the band's dislike of the album, it reached No. 2 in the album charts. It included "This Garden", which reached No. 12 on the UK Singles Chart. In June 1993 they released the Belaruse EP which included a live cover of "Subvert", the first single from the anarchist punk band Zounds.

=== 1994–1998 ===
1994 saw the Levellers reach the peak of their popularity with a headlining appearance at Glastonbury Festival and a record breaking set on the main stage when they performed to around 300,000 people, speculated to be the largest ever at the festival. They also became involved in the campaign against the Criminal Justice Act.

In 1994 the band purchased a derelict factory in Brighton, named the "Metway" after the factory's original owners, and created a self-contained headquarters. The buildings housed their offices, fan club, rehearsal area, a bar and a recording studio that was initially equipped with gear bought from Tom Robinson. The move enabled the band to operate on their own terms as far as possible. The spare space that remained was given over to other Brighton musicians and small craft businesses. Weekly anarchist newspaper SchNEWS also set up their office in the building.

"Hope Street", the lead single from the Zeitgeist album, was the first recording to come out of Metway. The album was released in September 1995 and charted at No. 2 in the week of its release. Buoyed by the initial success, manager Phil Nelson persuaded China Records to advertise the album on television and, unusually, the album reached No. 1 in its second week on the chart. The third single released from this album took the Levellers to their first Top of the Pops appearance, playing the tongue-in-cheek drinking anthem "Just the One" whilst dressed in tuxedos. "Just the One" was specially re-recorded for the single release, with The Clash's frontman and long-time Levellers hero Joe Strummer guesting on honky tonk piano. It reached No. 12 in the UK.

The Levellers embarked on another tour of Europe and the UK towards the end of 1995, culminating in a one-off "Christmas Freakshow" at Sheffield Arena on 18 December. This was recorded by the BBC with eight songs being broadcast at a later date on Radio 1. The 1995 "Total Chaos" tour came to an end on 7 February 1996 at Blackpool's Empress Ballroom with a show that was filmed for the video and live album release, Headlights, White Lines, Black Tar Rivers (Best Live). The album reached No. 13 in the UK Albums Chart and a less extensive UK tour was undertaken in September/October to support the record's release. An EP Exodus EP was lifted from the live album.

The band returned to the studio through late 1996 and early 1997 when the album Mouth to Mouth was recorded. Their first gigs in several months coincided with the Labour Party's landslide general election victory on 1 May 1997, one being held at Manchester Academy and a second at London's Brixton Academy the following night. These gigs previewed several new songs including "What a Beautiful Day", which became the first single release from Mouth to Mouth and reached No. 13 on the UK chart.

Summer 1997 saw the band play at various festivals in the UK and Europe including a return to Glastonbury Festival, playing an afternoon slot on the Pyramid Stage. The album was finally released in August 1997 and entered the UK Albums Chart at No. 5. The album spawned several more singles, "Celebrate", "Dog Train" and "Too Real", the last of which had an accompanying video directed by cult film director Alex Cox.

One Way of Life: The Very Best of The Levellers was released in September 1998. The album was a traditional "greatest hits" package of the hit singles, with two new songs, "Shadow on the Sun" and "Bozos". Additionally, "One Way" and "Carry Me" were re-recorded, and a re-mix of "Too Real" was included. A limited edition digipak format was released with an extra five-track CD of "acoustic" versions. A long and successful tour across the UK followed in November and December. However, the last two dates at Brixton Academy and the planned homecoming at Brighton Centre had to be postponed when Jon Sevink fell ill. These dates were rescheduled for February 1999. The release of the greatest hits album was accompanied by a video collection of promos, also called "One Way of Life: The Very Best of The Levellers", and the band's official biography written by George Berger entitled Dance Before the Storm.

=== 1999–2008 ===
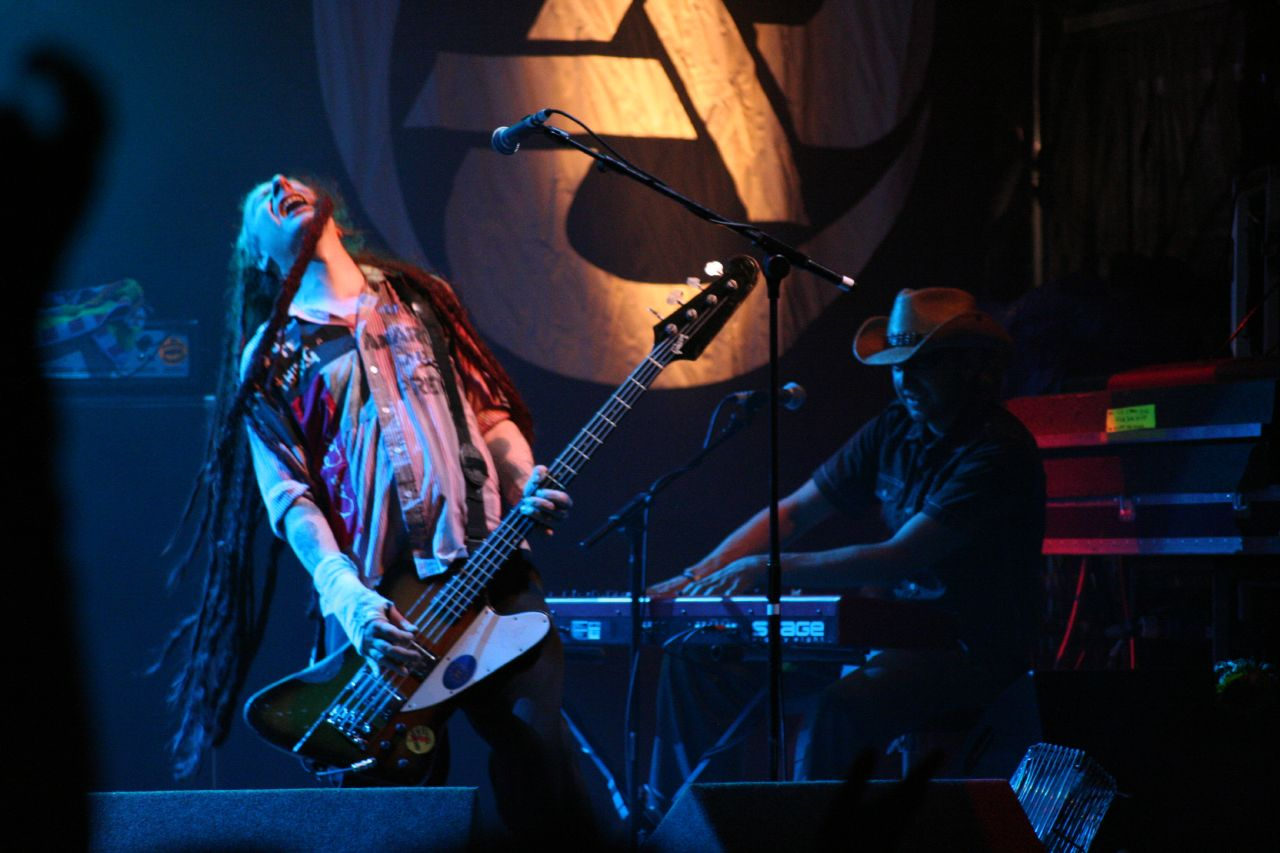
Jeremy Cunningham and Matt Savage, Beautiful Days Festival, Devon 20 August 2006

The Levellers played only a handful of live dates in 1999. During this time out of the limelight there was a significant change at their record company as China Records was bought by major label Warner Brothers.

Work eventually began on a new studio album, Hello Pig. The band drafted in Mark Wallis, who had worked with Oasis amongst others, to produce the record. This was an obvious change in direction, and the resulting complex production coloured the album. "Happy Birthday Revolution" was released as a single, reaching No. 57 in the charts. Just before the album's release the band promoted their own "OTF Weekender". This was held on the Isle of Wight with two big shows at the Ryde Ice Arena and a "secret" acoustic show held at a much smaller venue.

Hello Pig was released on Monday 4 September 2000, and went to No. 28. It received possibly the best critical acclaim the band had yet received, but was less popular with existing fans. With the relative commercial failure of the album, the band and the record company severed their relationship by mutual agreement.

Despite the downturn in record sales, the Levellers performed a heavy gig schedule through late 2000 and 2001. This included a return to the United States as a stripped down version featuring only Chadwick, Friend and Sevink playing acoustic shows in February 2001, with the same trio returning to play a lengthier tour in June the same year.

In early 2002, their focus returned to making new music with Al Scott returning as producer. After the recording was completed, the band played a short UK tour of smaller venues to preview the new songs, and they were well received by the fans and heralded as a "return to form". Meanwhile, after contemplating releasing the new material on their own Hag label, the band eventually signed a new deal with Eagle Records. The "Come On" single preceded the album and failed to make the Top 40 in the UK Singles Chart. Green Blade Rising (originally a title of one of the Levellers' earliest songs) was released in September 2002 and also failed to reach the Top 40 of the UK Albums Chart.

Meanwhile, the band were growing weary of the existing UK festival scene and decided to put on a festival of their own. This would be a return - as far as UK legislation would allow - to the earlier festivals that the young Levellers had enjoyed, such as Elephant Fayre. "Green Blade Fayre" was the title of the first attempt, and was to be held at Bicton Park, East Devon, England in August 2002. Despite the backing of the necessary authorities, an organised local population managed to persuade the East Devon council to reject the licence application.

Nonetheless, in 2003 the Levellers founded their own festival - Beautiful Days. The festival is now an annual event, taking place each August at Escot Park, near Fairmile in Devon, England. In February 2004, the Levellers played a special acoustic gig at the Buxton Opera House. Although they had played a couple of shows in a similar format, this particular show saw the full band being joined onstage for collaborations with Maddy Prior, Nick Harper, Nick Burbridge, and Rev Hammer. The show set the tone for the rest of the year, with the band appearing at many festivals through the summer in the acoustic guise, including the Beverley Folk Festival in June. These festival dates included their first visit to Glastonbury since 1997, where they captured another audience record on the Avalon Stage. The year was rounded off with an acoustic tour of UK theatres.

In May 2005 the Levellers' seventh studio album, Truth and Lies, was released. Mark Wallis returned as producer, with Dave Ruffy - drummer with UK punk band The Ruts - also producing. The album, released on Eagle Records, was generally upbeat - typified by the track "Make You Happy" - and a second single, "Last Man Alive", was also released. Following the previous year's acoustic live work, 2005 saw the band tour the UK and Europe as a full electric band once again, and this continued into 2006.

Disillusioned with Eagle Records' attempt to market their music, the Levellers decided to set up their own record label - On the Fiddle Recordings. The label's first release was a live DVD, Chaos Theory, in October 2006 and includes a live show from Reading Hexagon and the 1993 tour diary/concert "Part Time Punks".

In early 2007, the band went on an electric tour, visiting Scandinavia, Germany, the Netherlands, Belgium, the UK and Ireland. The intensive touring schedule continued with the band playing a number of festivals throughout the summer, including Wychwood, Rhythm, Bestival, Fflam, Solfest and Le Mans 24 Hours. During this time their Warner albums were remixed and re-issued on the Rhino label in 2007.

The winter touring schedule was comparatively light, with an eleven-show electric tour of Europe in November and a short acoustic tour of the UK in December. Sessions for a new album were also underway around this time, with Sean Lakeman (brother of Seth) as producer. February 2008 saw Chadwick, Friend, and Sevink participate in the "Freeborn John" tour, while in March the band played four 20th anniversary gigs in a short tour termed "Beautiful Nights". This trio of gigs began at Wolverhampton Civic Hall on 6 March, continued with a gig at Manchester Apollo on 7 March, and concluded with a show at London Brixton Academy on 8 March.

Appearing once again at a host of festivals throughout the summer of 2008, the Levellers showcased tracks from their upcoming album. Released in August 2008, coinciding with the Beautiful Days Festival, Letters from the Underground, was their eighth studio album and charted at No. 24, the band's first Top 30 album in a decade.

=== 2009–present ===
In 2009, On the Fiddle released a recording of their 2008 appearance at the Royal Albert Hall - "Live At The Royal Albert Hall" via iTunes. At the start of 2010, the band toured the UK, visiting Crewe, Holmfirth, Brecon and Tunbridge Wells. The band performed at the Glastonbury music festival in the summer and then continued on the 'grass roots' path with a tour in November to promote the re-release of their debut album, A Weapon Called The Word on their own On the Fiddle label. The band received the Roots Award at the BBC Radio 2 Folk Awards in 2011.

Their first new album in four years, Static on the Airwaves was released in June 2012, via On the Fiddle. The first single from the album, "Truth Is", was released for Record Store Day on limited edition red vinyl. The band released a Greatest Hits album in September 2014, featuring four new collaborations with Imelda May, Frank Turner, Bellowhead and Billy Bragg. A film A Curious Life: The Story of the Levellers (by Dunstan Bruce, formerly of Chumbawamba), was released in June 2015.

In 2016 they embarked on a UK tour of the Levelling The Land album to mark its 25th anniversary, reissuing the album themselves in a special box set along with a live recording of the album. In 2017, they began working with producer John Leckie at Abbey Road's Studio 2. In 2018, the Levellers released We the Collective in which they reworked several of their songs with a string and percussion section composed of members of folk-rock band Moulettes. Hannah Moulette also sings on some tracks. The collective recorded two entirely new tracks "The Shame" and "Drug Bust McGee" to create a 10 track album. The album reached number 12 in the UK Albums Chart.

On 7 February 2020, the band announced via their Twitter account that their new album Peace would be released on 14 August 2020, with the advance release of first single 'Food Roof Family'. It is the band's first studio album of new material in eight years.

In 2022, the band announced that Dan Donnelly had joined as a full time member, while clarifying that Simon Friend remained a member and was expected to rejoin the band on the road in future.

== Members ==
=== Current members ===
- Mark Chadwick – lead vocals, guitar, banjo, harmonica (1988–present)
- Jeremy "Jez" Cunningham – bass guitar, guitar, bouzouki, backing vocals (1988–present)
- Charlie Heather – drums, percussion (1988–present)
- Jonathan "Jon" Sevink – fiddle, violin, tin whistle, sequencer, sample loop (1988–present)
- Simon Friend – guitar, mandolin, harmonica, vocals (1990–present; hiatus 2021–present)
- Matt Savage – keyboards, backing vocals (2003–present)
- Dan Donnelly – guitar, mandolin, vocals (2021–present; touring 2021–2022)

=== Former members ===
- David Buckmeister – guitar (1988–1989)
- Alan Miles – guitar, mandolin, harmonica, vocals (1989–1990)

== Politics and name ==
Self-described as having "a left-wing view of politics", the band took their name after the 17th-century Levellers political movement. This was speculated for many years, but confirmed in October 2014 by band member Cunningham.

== Levellers logo ("Rolling Anarchy") ==
The "Rolling Anarchy" logo, designed by Jeremy Cunningham, is often used by the band. It is composed of three sickles placed so as to form the letter A, recognizable however the logo is rotated.

The symbol is often featured on Levellers merchandise and at concerts. It is usually surrounded with the text "Whoever puts their hand upon me to govern me is a usurper, a tyrant, and I declare them my enemy." These words, originally by the French anarchist philosopher Pierre-Joseph Proudhon, had previously been used by the band Zounds who originally released their single "Can't Cheat Karma" featuring this quote on the Crass records label.

== Discography ==
=== Studio albums ===
- A Weapon Called the Word (1990)
- Levelling the Land (1991)
- Levellers (1993)
- Zeitgeist (1995)
- Mouth to Mouth (1997)
- Hello Pig (2000)
- Green Blade Rising (2002)
- Truth and Lies (2005)
- Letters from the Underground (2008)
- Static on the Airwaves (2012)
- We the Collective (2018)
- Peace (2020)
- Together All the Way (2023)

== See also ==
- Beautiful Days
- 3 Daft Monkeys
