= Green Blade Rising =

Studio album by Levellers
- Released: 23 September 2002
- Recorded: Winter 2001 and spring 2002
- Genre: Folk rock
- Length: 37:12
- Label: Eagle
- Producer: Alan Scott

Levellers chronology
Hello Pig (2000)	Green Blade Rising (2002)	Truth and Lies (2005)

Professional ratings
Review scores
Source	Rating
AllMusic	3/5 stars
No Ripcord	7/10

Green Blade Rising is the seventh studio album by the Levellers, released in 2002.

== Track listing ==
- All band members are given writer's credits on all the tracks except on "Believers" where Stratton (Paddy) is also credited.
1. "Four Winds" – 3:22
2. "Falling from the Tree" – 4:07
3. "Pretty Target" – 3:40
4. "Come on" - 2:25
5. "Pour" – 4:16
6. "Aspects of Spirit" – 3:45
7. "Wild as Angels" - 2:56
8. "Believers" – 3:04
9. "A Chorus line" – 2:48
10. "Not What We Wanted" – 3:20
11. "Wake the world" – 3:29

CD Bonus Track

1. "Galahad" - 2:43

== Personnel ==
=== Musicians ===
- Mark Chadwick - Singing, guitar, banjo
- Simon Friend - guitar, vocals
- Jonathan Sevink - violin, tin whistle
- Charlie Heather - drums
- Jeremy Cunningham - bass guitar, artwork
- Matt Savage - keyboards, backing vocals

- Rowan Godel - backing vocals
- Tim O'Leary - whistles
- Chopper - cello

=== Technical staff ===
- Alan Scott - production
- Jake Rousham - engineering
- Alan Scott and Jon Sevink
