= Letters from the Underground =

Studio album by Levellers
- Released: 11 August 2008
- Genre: Rock, alternative rock, folk punk
- Label: On the Fiddle
- Producer: Sean Lakeman

Levellers chronology
Truth and Lies (2005)	Letters from the Underground (2008)	Static on the Airwaves (2012)

Professional ratings
Aggregate scores
Source	Rating
Metacritic	54/100
Review scores
Source	Rating
AllMusic	3/5 stars
Daily Mirror	4/5 stars
The Guardian	2/5 stars

Letters from the Underground is the ninth studio album by folk-punk rock band the Levellers. It includes the single "Burn America Burn", which is a social commentary on the recurrence of school shootings in the US.

== Track listing ==
1. "The Cholera Well"
2. "Death Loves Youth"
3. "Eyes Wide"
4. "Before the End"
5. "Burn America Burn"
6. "Heart of the Country"
7. "Pale Rider"
8. "A Life Less Ordinary"
9. "Accidental Anarchist"
10. "Duty"
11. "Fight or Flight"

Bonus Disc - Letters from the Underground (Metway Acoustic)

1. "On the Beach"
2. "The Everyday"
3. "TV Suicides"

== Personnel ==
=== Musicians ===
- Mark Chadwick - guitars, vocals
- Charlie Heather - drums/percussion
- Jeremy Cunningham - bass guitar, artwork
- Simon Friend - guitars, vocals, mandolin
- Jonathan Sevink - fiddle
- Matt Savage - keyboard
