= We the Collective =

Studio album by Levellers
- Released: 30 March 2018
- Recorded: Abbey Road Studios
- Genre: Rock, alternative rock, folk punk
- Label: On the Fiddle Recordings
- Producer: John Leckie

Levellers chronology
Static on the Airwaves (2012)	We the Collective (2018)	Peace (2020)

We the Collective is the eleventh studio album by folk-punk rock band the Levellers. The album entered the British album charts at number 12, the band's highest-charting entry in over 21 years. The 10-track album features acoustic re-recordings of many of the band's greatest hits, with two new songs "Shame" and "Drug Bust McGee".

The album was produced by John Leckie.

== Track listing ==
1. "Exodus"
2. "Liberty Song"
3. "England My Home"
4. "Subvert"
5. "Hope Street"
6. "Elation"
7. "Dance Before the Storm"
8. "The Shame"
9. "Drug Bust McGee"
10. "One Way"

The deluxe edition included four additional tracks:

1. "Fifteen Years"
2. "Outside Inside"
3. "All the Unknown"
4. "Said and Done"

== Personnel ==
=== Musicians ===
- Mark Chadwick - guitars, vocals
- Charlie Heather - drums/percussion
- Jeremy Cunningham - bass guitar, artwork
- Simon Friend - guitars, vocals, mandolin
- Jonathan Sevink - fiddle
- Matt Savage - keyboard
- Moulettes - cello, percussion, violin, viola, vocals
- Laura Kidd - guest vocals
