= Mouth to Mouth (Levellers album) =

Studio album by Levellers
- Released: 25 August 1997
- Recorded: 1997 at the Metway, Brighton
- Genre: Rock, alternative rock, folk punk
- Length: 48:41
- Label: China
- Producer: Jon Kelly

Levellers chronology
Zeitgeist (1995)	Mouth to Mouth (1997)	One Way of Life (1998)

Singles from Mouth to Mouth
- 1. "What a Beautiful Day" Released: 1997; 2. "Celebrate" Released: 1997; 3. "Dog Train" Released: 1997; 4. "Too Real" Released: 1998

Professional ratings
Review scores
Source	Rating
AllMusic	4/5 stars
NME	7/10

Mouth to Mouth is the fifth studio album by the Levellers. It was released on the China label in 1997 and peaked at No. 5 in the UK album charts.

== Track listing ==
1. "Dog Train"
2. "What A Beautiful Day"
3. "Celebrate"
4. "Rain and Snow"
5. "Far Away"
6. "C.C.T.V."
7. "Chemically Free"
8. "Elation"
9. "Captains' Courageous"
10. "Survivors"
11. "Sail Away"
12. "Too Real"

The 2007 re-issue of this album also contained the bonus tracks:

1. "Bar Room Jury"
2. "Angels"
3. "All Your Dreams"
4. "Windows"

== Personnel ==
=== Musicians ===
- Mark Chadwick - vocals, guitars
- Simon Friend - guitars, vocals, banjo
- Jonathan Sevink - violin, sample loops
- Charlie Heather - drums
- Jeremy Cunningham - bass guitar
- Eddi Reader - backing vocals
- Steve Broughton - keyboards
- Christopher Taylor - percussion
- Marcus McArrol - pedal steel guitar
- The London Metropolitan Orchestra - strings
- The Kick Horns - brass instruments

=== Production staff ===
- Jon Kelly - producer
- Andrew Scarth - engineer
- Tim Young - mastering
