= Truth and Lies =

Studio album by Levellers
- Released: 23 May 2005
- Genre: Rock, alternative rock, folk punk
- Length: 43:25
- Label: Eagle
- Producer: Mark Wallis

Levellers chronology
Green Blade Rising (2002)	Truth and Lies (2005)	Letters from the Underground (2008)

Professional ratings
Review scores
Source	Rating
AllMusic	4/5 stars

Truth and Lies is the eighth studio album by the Levellers. It includes the singles "Make You Happy" and "Last Man Alive".

== Track listing ==
1. "Last Man Alive" – 3:07
2. "Make You Happy" – 3:45
3. "Confess" – 4:49
4. "For Us All" – 3:28
5. "Knot Around the World" – 3:31
6. "Steel Knife" – 4:21
7. "Wheels" – 3:48
8. "Said and Done" – 3:11
9. "Who's the Daddy" – 3:51
10. "The Damned" – 4:01
11. "Sleeping" – 5:33

== Personnel ==
=== Musicians ===
- Mark Chadwick - guitars, vocals
- Charlie Heather - drums/percussion
- Jeremy Cunningham - bass guitar, artwork
- Simon Friend - guitars, vocals, mandolin
- Jonathan Sevink - fiddle
- Matt Savage - keyboard
