= Static on the Airwaves =

Studio album by Levellers
- Released: 25 June 2012
- Genre: Rock, alternative rock, folk punk
- Label: On the Fiddle Recordings
- Producer: Sean Lakeman

Levellers chronology
Letters from the Underground (2008)	Static on the Airwaves (2012)	We the Collective (2018)

Static on the Airwaves is the tenth studio album by folk-punk rock band the Levellers.

The "iTunes Deluxe Edition" contains two bonus tracks and two videos. Two singles were released from the album, 'Truth Is' and 'The Recruiting Sergeant', with single edits of 'We Are All Gunmen' and 'After The Hurricane' being made available as part of the 2017 Special Edition release.

== Reception ==
Professional ratings
Review scores
Source	Rating
The Independent	3/5 stars
Record Collector	4/5 stars

Ian Abrahams of Record Collector said the topic of war gives the album a "clear sense of conscience and purpose". He thought it was an improvement on its predecessor: "what they've got here is a dynamic play-it-loud maelstrom of sawing fiddles and firebrand lyrics".

== Track listing ==
1. "Static on the Airwaves"
2. "We Are All Gunmen"
3. "Truth Is"
4. "After the Hurricane"
5. "Our Forgotten Towns"
6. "No Barriers"
7. "Alone in This Darkness"
8. "Raft of the Medusa"
9. "Mutiny"
10. "Traveller"
11. "Second Life"
12. "The Recruiting Sergeant"

iTunes bonus tracks

13. "Going Places"
14. "Ways We Have Won"
15. Truth Is (Video)
16. Jeremy Cunningham's Tales From The Turntable (Video)

== Personnel ==
=== Musicians ===
- Mark Chadwick - guitars, vocals
- Charlie Heather - drums/percussion
- Jeremy Cunningham - bass guitar, artwork
- Simon Friend - guitars, vocals, mandolin
- Jonathan Sevink - fiddle
- Matt Savage - keyboard
