= China Records =

British record label

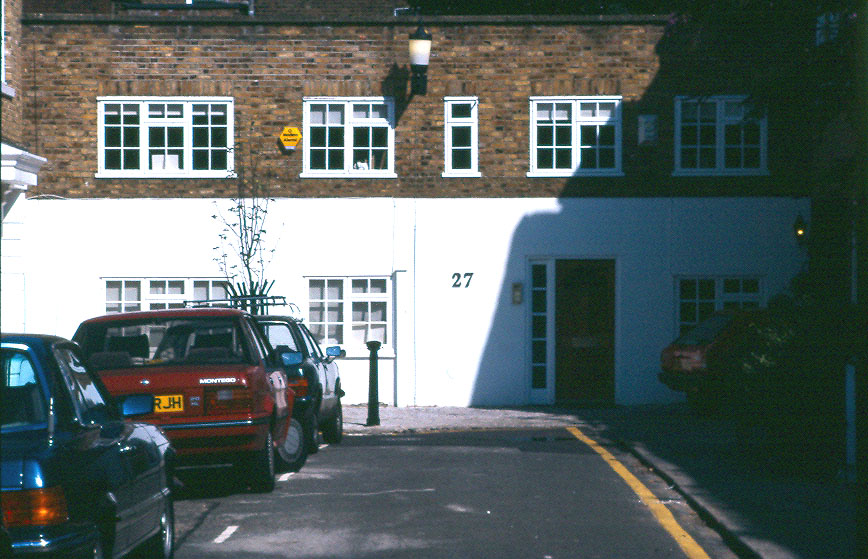
- China Records in London (1986)
- Founded: 1 October 1984
- Status: Defunct
- Distributors: Pinnacle Records (local UK distributor), outside UK Chrysalis Records (1986-1987), Polydor Records (1988-1990), Warner Music Group (1997-)
- Genre: Indie Rock
- Country of origin: UK

China Records was a British record label, now a division of Warner Music Group, founded 1 October 1984 by Derek Green. Its top-selling artists were Art of Noise, Morcheeba and the Levellers.

In 1986 and 1987, China Records releases were manufactured and marketed worldwide by Chrysalis Records, and then by Polydor Records in 1988 through 1990.

From 1991 the labels UK releases were made and distributed by the now defunct Pinnacle Records, with material being licensed to various other labels for international release.

In February 1992 Derek Green quit the British Phonographic Industry over their stance on the independent chart, whilst the label distribution went major in 1997 when it was acquired by Warner Music Group. With this deal, China was distributed through Discovery Records in the US, and is now being distributed through Sire Records since Discovery folded. Overseas releases are handled primarily by Warner Manufacturing Europe.

== Sub-labels ==
- Indochina Records — a dance offshoot featuring acts such as Morcheeba.

== Artists ==
- Kevin Kitchen
- Art of Noise
- Blameless
- Daniel Davies and Jonna Parkes
- The Dogs D'Amour
- The Egg
- The Fountainhead
- Gods of Luxury
- Green on Red
- Levellers
- Loud
- Morcheeba
- The Name
- Cheap & Nasty
- Rialto
- Labi Siffre
- Louchie Lou & Michie One
- The Wishplants
- Ugly As Sin
- Zion Train

== See also ==
- List of record labels
